= List of Shang dynasty states =

Polities that existed during the Shang dynasty

Map of the Shang dynasty with archaeological sites marked in black and red.

This is a list of the various polities that existed during the Shang dynasty in ancient China, attested in oracle bones, bronze inscriptions, and the Chinese classics.

== Background ==
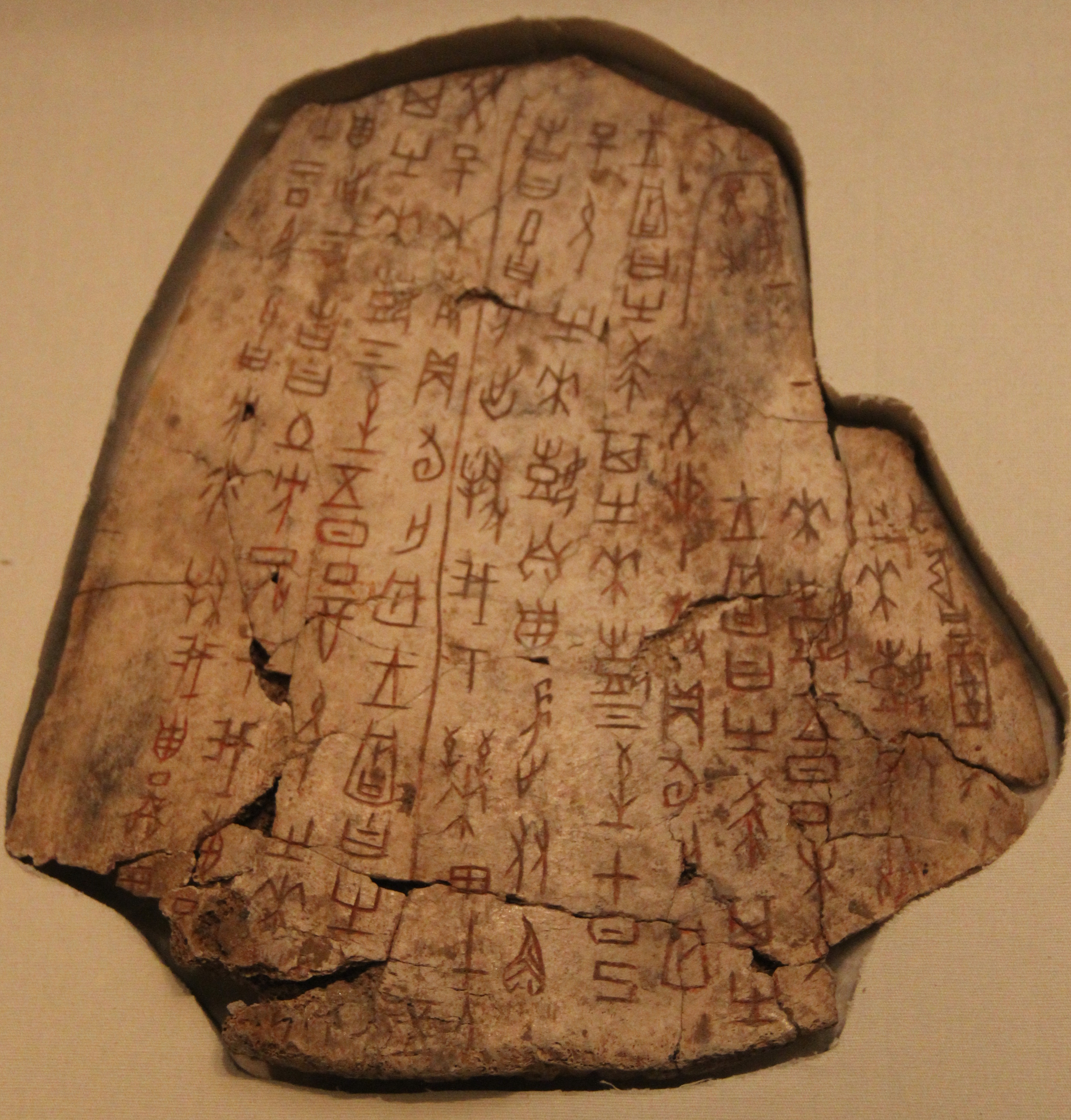
Oracle bone inscription on Ox scapula by Nan about disasters during a war with the Gongfang (𢀛方).

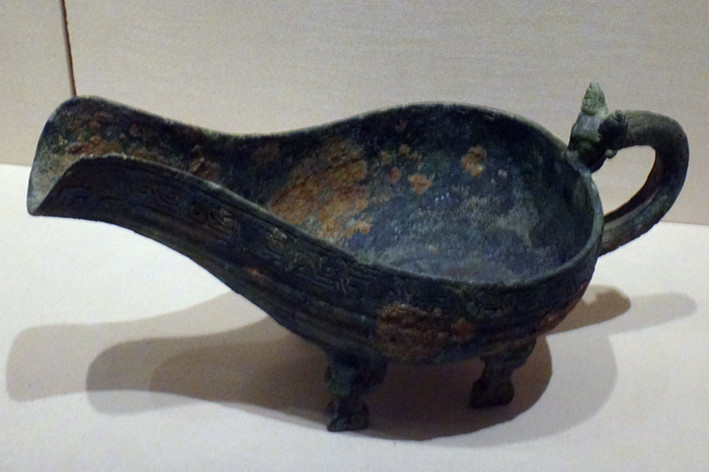
Bronze yi pourer mentioning An, Earl of Ji (㠱伯𤥃), corresponding to the Jifang.

The Shang dynasty was the earliest archaeologically attested dynasty of China, dating back to around 1,600 BCE. During this time, numerous polities coexisted with the Shang people, including Predynastic Zhou, all of which had differing relations with them at different times. The Shang called differing polities fang (方), which in Modern Standard Chinese means "place." The names for these polities comes from the Chinese classics (e.g. Records of the Grand Historian) written after the Shang dynasty was defeated at the Battle of Muye, Shang-Zhou dynasty ritual bronzes, and oracle bones unearthed at Yinxu and other sites. The latter two were written in bronze script and oracle bone script, respectively, which are ancient versions of the modern Han script used to write Chinese. Therefore, some names may not be stable. In oracle bone inscriptions, different polities were often referred to as name + "方", from which contemporary state names are derived. Modern scholarship often refers to these polities as fangguo (方國), translating to “fang polities” or “regional states,” though the precise status of each named group is debated.

== List of states ==
The Latin names of these states are pronounced according to the Pinyin system established by the People's Republic of China in 1958, which is different from their ancient pronunciations in Old Chinese given the thousands of years of language change.

Romanized name	Chinese name	Period of existence	Rough geographical location	Relationship with the Shang dynasty	Attested in
Shang	商	Xia dynasty, (Note: The existence of the Xia dynasty is disputed due to a lack of testable evidence.) Shang dynasty	Yinxu (大邑商 "Da Yi Shang", "Shang, the Great City") (present Anyang)		Records of the Grand Historian; Oracle bones Ritual bronzes
Zifang	子方	Shang dynasty		ally? (Note: Thought to be related to the Zi surname held by the Shang royal family)	Oracle bones
Tufang	土方	Early to middle Shang dynasty, conquered by Wu Ding	Northwest of Yin, east of Hong Fang (present Fen River Basin, Shanxi Province)	enemy	Book of Poetry (Chang Fa (長發); Oracle bones
Gongfang	𢀛方	Shang dynasty, to period of Zu Geng	Northwest of Yin, west of Tu Fang (north of present Shaanxi Province, Shanxi-Shaanxi Plateau)	swing	Oracle bones
Guifang	鬼方	Shang dynasty	Northwest of Yin (present central Shanxi Province and northern Shaanxi province, Shanxi-Shaanxi Plateau)	ally	Records of the Grand Historian; Bamboo Annals
Qiang	羌方	Shang dynasty	Northwest of Yin (present Shaanxi Province, the area around Gansu Province, Shanxi-Shaanxi Plateau)	swing	Records of the Grand Historian; Book of Poetry; Oracle bones
Northern Qiang	北羌	Shang dynasty	Northwest of Yin, north of Qiangfang	swing	Oracle bones
Renfang (Note: Often identified as the Dongyi.)	人方	Shang dynasty	Southeast of Yin, coast of the Donghai (present Huai River basin and coast of the Yellow Sea at the Shandong Peninsula, northern Anhui and southern Shandong))	enemy	Oracle bones
Zhou (Note: Identification of the Zhoufang as the Predynastic Zhou is disputed.)	周方	Middle to late Shang dynasty, overthrew Di Xin and established the Zhou dynasty.	West of Yin (present Qishan County)	swing	Records of the Grand Historian
Dapeng	大彭	Shang dynasty	East of Yin (present Tongshan)	swing	Records of the Grand Historian; Bamboo Annals; Oracle bones
Tangfang	唐方	Shang dynasty	Northwest of Yin		
Jingfang	井方	Shang dynasty	East of Yin	ally	Oracle bones
Linfang	林方	Shang dynasty	South of Mount Tai and north of Wen River	swing	Records of the Grand Historian
Xingfang	興方	Shang dynasty	Unknown	swing	Oracle bones
Mafang	馬方	Shang dynasty	West of Yin (present Shilou County)	enemy	Possibly in bronze inscriptions (e.g. Ma gui (馬簋).
Shifang	豕方	Shang dynasty			
Weifang or Xiawei	危方 or 下危	Shang dynasty		enemy, later conquered	Oracle bones
Yufang	盂方	Shang dynasty	East of Yin		Oracle bones
Zhifang	沚方	Shang dynasty	West of Yin (Shanxi-Shaanxi Plateau); arguments are made for the east.	swing	Oracle bones
Pangfang	旁方	Shang dynasty		swing	Oracle bones
Gefang	戈方	Shang dynasty	West of Yin (present south of Shanxi Province)	ally	Oracle bones
Mufang	木方	Shang dynasty			Bronze inscriptions Oracle bones
Bafang	巴方	Xia dynasty, Shang dynasty	Sichuan Province, also argued to be to be southern Shaanxi or Jianghan	enemy	Bamboo Annals; Oracle bones
Shu	蜀	Shang dynasty	Sichuan Province	enemy	Bamboo Annals; Oracle bones，Yizhoushu
Genfang	亙方	Shang dynasty	West of Yin (Shanxi-Shaanxi Plateau)	enemy, suppressed	Oracle bones
Longfang	龍方	Shang dynasty	West of Yin (Shanxi-Shaanxi Plateau); arguments are made for an eastern location.	swing	Oracle bones
Jifang	基方	Shang dynasty	West of Yin (present Puxian)	enemy	Oracle bones
Jianfang	湔方	Shang dynasty	West of Yin (Shanxi-Shaanxi Plateau)	enemy	Oracle bones
Jifang	祭方	Shang dynasty	West of Yin, between Shang and Zhou	swing	Oracle bones
Shifang	示方	Shang dynasty			
Maofang	髳方	Shang dynasty		enemy	Bamboo Annals
Zhaofang	召方	Shang dynasty	West of Yin (Shanxi-Shaanxi Plateau)	enemy	Oracle bones
Yinfang	印方	Shang dynasty			
Hufang	虎方	Shang dynasty	East of Yin	swing	Records of the Grand Historian; Bronze inscriptions
Weifang	微方	Shang dynasty			Bamboo Annals; Oracle bones
Xifang	息方	Shang dynasty	South of Yin (Luoshan County)	ally	Oracle bones
Miefang	眣方	Shang dynasty			
Zhifang	止方	Shang dynasty			
Yinfang	尹方	Shang dynasty			
Bufang	步方	Shang dynasty			Oracle bones
Guifang	歸方	Shang dynasty	South of Yin (present Zigui)	enemy	Oracle bones?
Zengfang	曾方	Shang dynasty			
Zhufang	祝方	Shang dynasty			
Nongfang	弄方	Shang dynasty			
Chuifang	吹方	Shang dynasty			Oracle bones
Chefang	屮方 (艸方?)	Shang dynasty			
Yuejifang	月丮方	Shang dynasty			
Chengefang?	辰鬲方	Shang dynasty	West of Yin, Shanxi-Shaanxi Plateau	enemy	
	方	Shang dynasty		ally	
Qifang	㠱方	Shang dynasty	North of Yin (present Beijing and northeastern Hebei, to the west of Liaoning)	ally	Oracle bones?
	方	Shang dynasty			
	方	Shang dynasty			
	方	Shang dynasty			
	方	Shang dynasty	West of Yin (Shanxi-Shaanxi Plateau)	swing	
	方	Shang dynasty			
Gu	雇	Shang dynasty	South of Yin (present southwest of Yuanyang County, northwest of Yuanwu Town, Henan Province)	ally	Oracle bones
Bao	暴	Shang dynasty	South of Yin (present Yuanyang County)	ally	Oracle bones through a Marquess name
Lu	盧	Shang dynasty	South of Yin (present Zhushan County and Ankang City)	enemy	Oracle bones
Shi	矢方	Shang dynasty	Unknown	enemy	
You	攸	Shang dynasty	East of Yin (present southern part of Yongcheng City and northwestern part of Suzhou City)	ally	Oracle bones
Yuan	元	Shang dynasty	East of Yin (present Yongcheng City)	ally	
Jifang	及	Shang dynasty	East of Yin (present Yongcheng City)	ally	
Shen	侁	Shang dynasty	East of Yin (present Cao County)		
Gao	告	Shang dynasty	East of Yin (present Chengwu County)	ally	
Dun	盾	Shang dynasty	East of Yin	ally	
Tui	魋	Shang dynasty	East of Yin	enemy	
Yachou	亞醜	Shang dynasty	East of Yin (present Qingzhou, Shandong)	ally	Bronze inscriptions
Jifang	紀	Shang dynasty	East of Yin (present Shouguang)		
Xue or Pi	薛 or 邳	Shang dynasty	East of Yin (present Tengzhou)	ally	Records of the Grand Historian; Bronze inscriptions
Feng	豐	Shang dynasty	East of Yin	swing	
Pang	逢	Shang dynasty	East of Yin	ally	
Bogu	薄姑	Shang dynasty	East of Yin	ally	Bamboo Annals
Yufang	鬱方	Shang dynasty	Unknown	ally	Oracle bones?
Xuanfang	宣方	Shang dynasty	Unknown	ally	Oracle bones? , Yizhoushu
Xiufang	羞方	Shang dynasty	West of Yin (Shanxi-Shaanxi Plateau)	swing	Oracle bones
Songfang	宋方	Shang dynasty	North of Yin (present Zhao County)	ally	Oracle bones as an Earl
Beifang	貝方	Shang dynasty	South of Yin		
Cangfang	倉方	Shang dynasty	West of Yin (present Shangzhou District)	ally	Oracle bones
Quanfang	犬方 (Note: Often attested as 犬侯 and sometimes argued to be the Rong)	Shang dynasty	West of Yin	swing	Oracle bones
Yangfang	昜方	Shang dynasty	West of Yin (present Hongdong)		
Foufang	缶方	Shang dynasty	West of Yin		Oracle bones
Danfang	丹方	Shang dynasty	West of Yin (present Qinyang)	ally	Oracle bones
Qu	去	Shang dynasty	West of Yin	ally	
Shangsi	上絲	Shang dynasty	West of Yin	ally	
Hefang	禾	Shang dynasty	West of Yin		
Guang	光	Shang dynasty	West of Yin, in modern-day Guang County, Henan	ally	Oracle bones
Ke	可	Shang dynasty	West of Yin (present Xiuwu County)	ally	
Er	耳	Shang dynasty	West of Yin (Shanxi-Shaanxi Plateau)	swing	
Lü	呂	Shang dynasty	West of Yin (Northern Shanxi-Shaanxi Plateau)	enemy	
Bing	丙	Shang dynasty	West of Yin (present Lingshi)		
Xian	先	Shang dynasty	West of Yin (present Fushan)		
Na	郍	Shang dynasty	West of Yin (present Xinzheng, Zhengzhou, Henan Province)		
Lu	鹿	Shang dynasty	West of Yin (present Song County)	swing	Bamboo Annals
Qi	耆	Shang dynasty	West of Yin (present Licheng)	swing	
Chong	崇，琮，虫	Shang dynasty	West of Yin (present Xi'an)	swing	Records of the Grand Historian
Mixu	密須	Shang dynasty	West of Yin (present Lingtai)	swing	Bamboo Annals
Jian	戔	Shang dynasty	Unknown	ally	
Ban	班	Shang dynasty	Unknown	ally?	Bamboo Annals
Gufang	榖方	Shang dynasty		ally	Oracle bones
Huo	霍	Shang dynasty		Ally	Yizhoushu
Mo	磨	Shang dynasty		Ally	Yizhoushu
Ai	艾	Shang dynasty		Ally	Yizhoushu
Yi	佚	Shang dynasty		Ally	Yizhoushu
Li	厲	Shang dynasty		Ally	Yizhoushu

== See also ==
- Ancient Chinese states
- List of Zhou dynasty states
