= Military of the Shang dynasty =

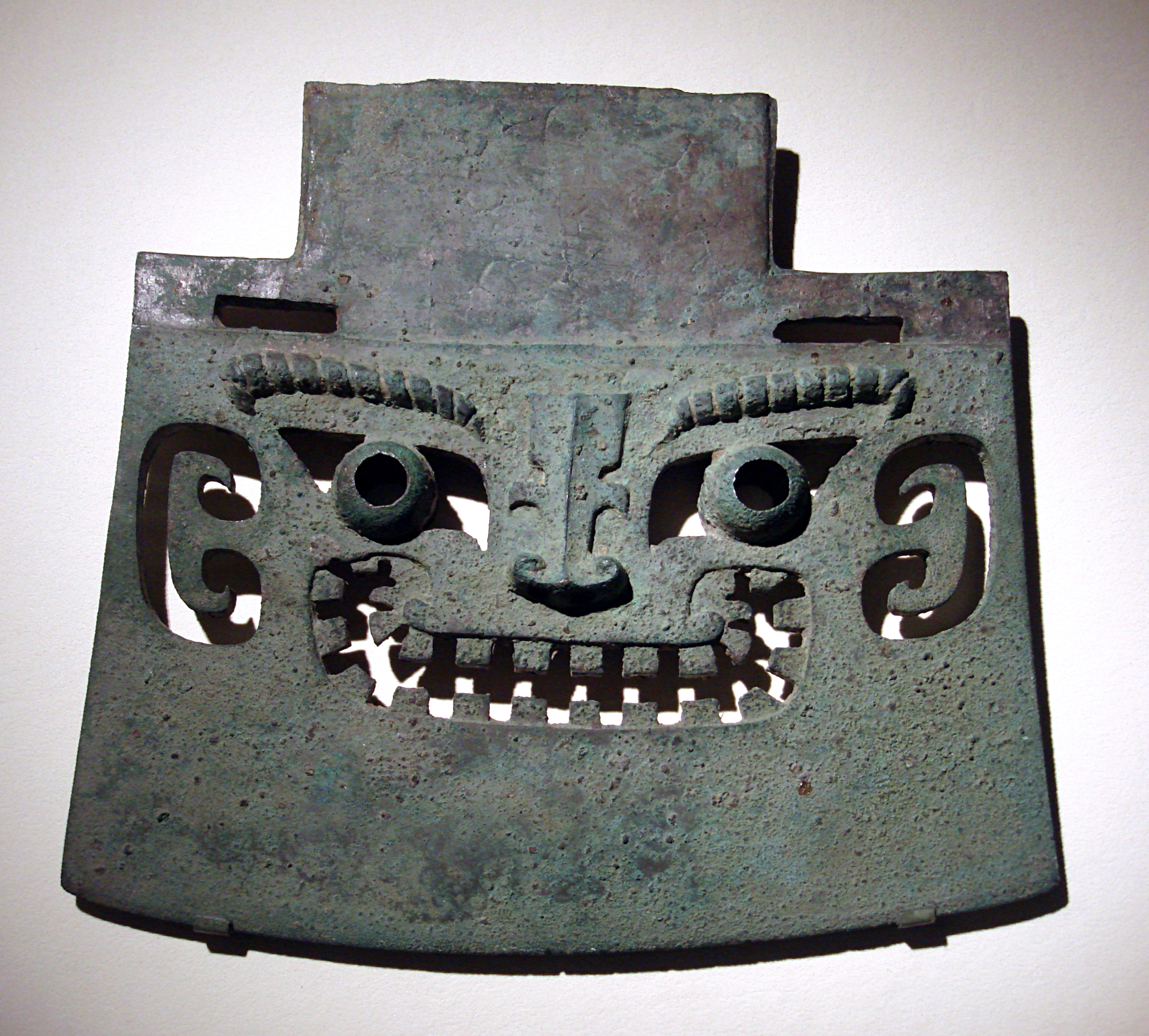
A bronze axe head dated to the Shang

The military of the Shang dynasty were the forces fighting under the Shang dynasty (Chinese: 商朝; pinyin: Shāng cháo), a royal dynasty of China ruling the area of today's Yellow River valley during the second millennium BCE.

Early Chinese armies were relatively small affairs. Composed of peasant levies, usually serfs dependent upon the king or the feudal lord of their home state, these armies were relatively ill-equipped. While organized military forces existed along with the state, few records remain of these early armies. These armies were centered around the chariot-riding nobility, who played a role akin to the European knight as they were the main fighting force of the army. Bronze weapons such as spears and swords were the main equipment of both the infantry and charioteers. These armies were ill-trained and haphazardly supplied, meaning that they could not campaign for more than a few months and often had to give up their gains due to lack of supplies.

== Warrior class ==
During the ancient Shang (1600–1046 BCE), the shi were regarded as a knightly social order of low-level aristocratic lineage compared to dukes and marquises. This social class was distinguished by their right to ride in chariots and command battles from mobile chariots, while they also served civil functions. During the Shang era, warfare was seen as an aristocratic affair, complete with protocols that may be compared to the chivalry of the European knight. The shi rose to power through their control of the new technology of bronzeworking. From 1300 BCE, the shi transitioned from foot knights to being primarily chariot archers, fighting with composite recurved bow, a double-edged sword known as the jian, and armour.

In the late Shang (Anyang period), the most common number of troops was 3,000, who would be organized into right, centre and left units:

丁酉貞: 王作三師右中左
On dīngyǒu (day 34) divined: the king will form three armies, right, centre and left.

— oracle bone Heji 33006

Each body of 1,000 footsoldiers would typically be accompanied by 100 archers and 100 chariots. Each chariot carried a driver, an archer and a spearman, all presumably specially trained and drawn from the petty elite class. Archaeology reveals that Shang chariot warriors were often buried in a style of the Ulaanzuukh culture of Mongolia, in which the body is put in a prone position. The Ulaanzuukh culture is thought to have been the ancestor of the Slab Grave Culture, linked to the early Turkic and Mongolic peoples.

== Organisation ==
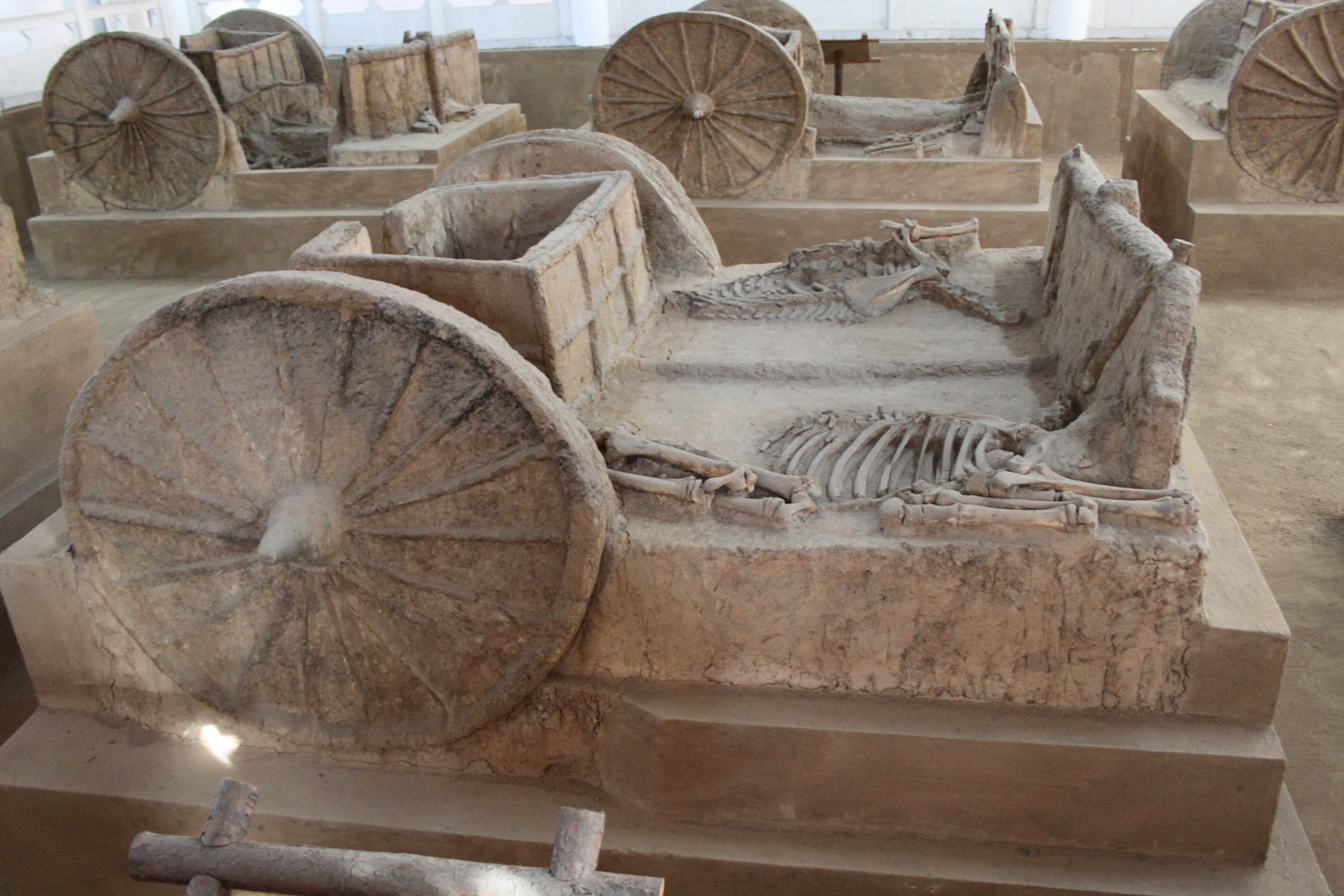
Chariot burials at Yinxu

Although the Shang probably had a small standing army, typical campaigns required levies of three or five thousand men, usually provided and led by lineage leaders.

The king might lead the army in person, or send one of his generals. Sometimes the Shang would attack together with allies. Divinatory inscriptions concerning planned military campaigns use the verb 'order' (令 líng) for local leaders under the direct control of the king and a different verb 'join with' or '(cause to) follow' for more distant allies. (Note: Authors differ on the reading of the character involved.) Although the Shang depended upon the military skills of their nobility, Shang rulers could mobilize the masses of town-dwelling and rural commoners as conscript laborers and soldiers for both campaigns of defense and conquest. Aristocrats and other state rulers were obligated to furnish their local garrisons with all necessary equipment, armor, and armaments. The Shang king maintained a force of about a thousand troops at his capital and would personally lead this force into battle.

Beyond their central domains, Shang kings maintained their networks of subordinates and allies through a series of military campaigns. Campaigns and raids also supplied captives to be sacrificed in Shang rituals.

=== Royal forces ===
Military affairs carried a high priority in the Shang dynasty and the Shang elite was a warrior class led by clan-based chiefdoms. Martial values and robust physical activity were necessities of Shang culture. Like warrior classes elsewhere, land was granted by the king in reward for military success and was rescinded in the event of failure. Even the last Shang emperor Xin, who was supposedly decadent, still had a reputation for great physical fighting ability. Contrary to the pacifistic assumptions of later scholars writing about the Shang, the Shang clearly viewed the military as paramount and civilian functions as subordinate. The Shang kings took on the roles of Commander-in-chief, Defence minister, as well as field commander, while royal family members, members of other noble clans, and high officials were also delegated battlefield command. Like the ancient Greeks, the Shang relied on divination to make decisions regarding military action. Shi, or army, was already a distinct unit, and this was also used as a prefixed title to designate generals. Lü or brigade was also a common combat unit, and so did hang or line. Battlefield armies were organised into left, right and center. Specialisation of military appointments was already evident under the Shang dynasty. Shi zhang or leader of the armies, may have been a functional title in the later period, where military organisation had become very formalised. There were clearly defined posts such as the ma (horse), ya (commander), fu (“quiver”), she (archer), wei (protector), ch’üan (dog), and shu (border protection), prefixed with tuo (many), indicating higher status and mou for “planning”. The discovery of multiple chariots in graves as well as tombs consisting entirely of horses and chariots demonstrate that the chariot was used in battle and not just prestige transport. The horse officers seemed to be particularly valued and played a prominent command role due to the importance of the horse in warfare.

From the reign of Wu Ding on, the numbers of permanent standing warriors increased and the conscription of zhongren (commoners) which originally played a support role, became much more common and important role in the military as army sizes expanded. However, the warrior clans were still the core of the army. A highly efficient military reporting system spanning hundreds of miles was organised with a network of boats, chariots, runners and horse riders supported by widely scattered state guesthouses and hostels. There was a system of drums and possibly also signal fires to signal enemy attacks. Military planning was already developed, with assessment of enemy strength, strategic options, routes of advance and transport and logistical necessities. Military campaigns were ordered to obtain the submission of neighbouring states, and others were meant to exterminate enemy states. Rudimentary tactics of taking advantageous positions, concentrating forces at key points and achieving surprise through for instance, ambush or reconnaissance, were in use. Archery was highly esteemed, and officials were already assigned to train soldiers in archery. Based on archaeological evidence the reflex bows of the period had the strength to pierce bone. The main hand-to-hand weapons were dagger-axes and battleaxes.

Several inscriptions mention troops raised and led by Wu Ding's consort Fu Hao. The consorts of the King, often more than one, played a key role in mobilising and even leading troops into battle. Each consort commanded armies of varying size, which seems to correspond to a hierarchy of rank between them. Branch lineages of the royal family commanded their own cities and armies and served the king in military campaigns, but these relationships were often unstable.

=== Noble forces ===
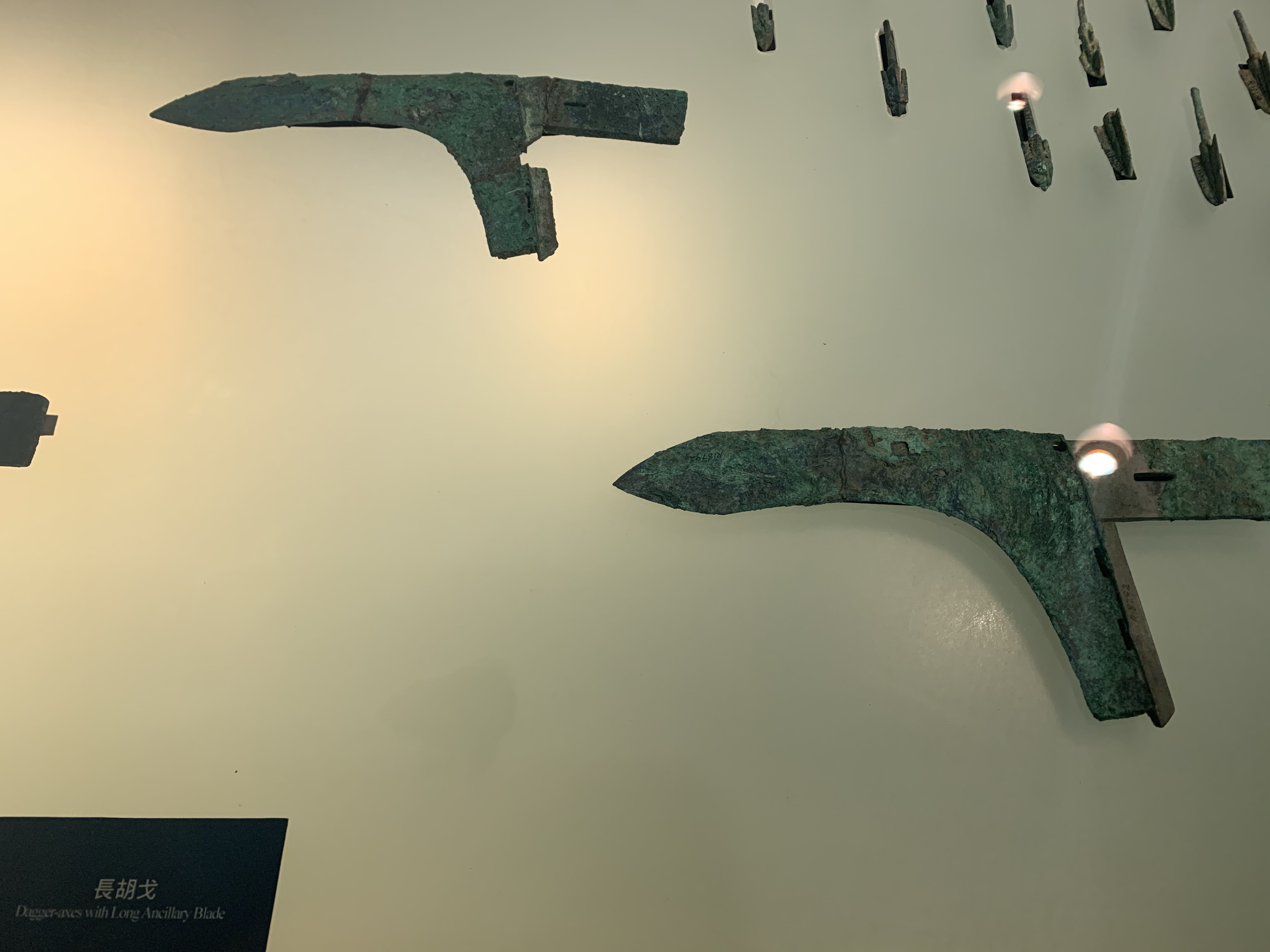
Bronze dagger-axes and arrowheads from the Yinxu site

Non-royal noble lineages, which may emerge from conquered states that subsequently intermarried with the Shang, played a crucial role in executing military campaigns against rebellious royals. This duty was never entrusted to the allied states (fangguo).

The Shang under Wu Ding were quick to establish suzerainty over defeated enemies such as the Que, Zhi and Yue states, drawing on their manpower to further their conquests without expending their own resources. Marriage alliances were used to secure the loyalty of the submitted states, and submitted vassals sometimes received high positions in the Shang government. Warriors of the Yi (barbarians) to the south were integrated into Shang units due to their archery skills.

=== Allied states ===
Allied states (fangguo) were led by earls (bo) and marquesses (hou), although the roles of these leaders were the same, which depended on their closeness to the Shang king, to the royal family, and their ability to provide service at any point of them. The fangguo were not "city-states" as typically understood as they each consisted of multiple settlements which may not possess a clearly defined economic or social center. Their relationship to the Shang could be unstable at times, alternating between war and loyal service, as evinced by the existence of Shang royal orders for one allied state to attack another. The Shang king also provided military protection to the weaker fangguo in exchange for assistance against larger, more rebellious ones. The fall of the Shang came about when the final Shang king Di Xin gained the ire of the fangguo by imposing greater control over them, sparking rebellion.

== Weaponry ==
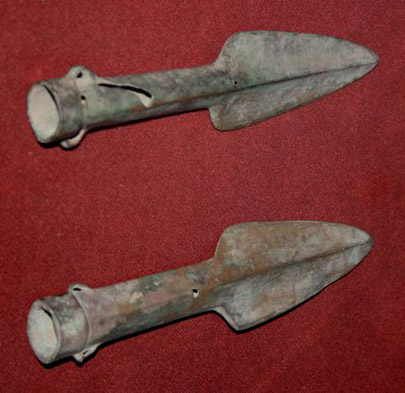
Shang dynasty bronze spearheads

Bronze weapons were an integral part of Shang society. Shang infantry were armed with a variety of stone and bronze weaponry, including spears, pole-axes, pole-based dagger-axes, composite bows, and bronze or leather helmets.

Aristocrats and commoners both fought with axe, spear, bow and dagger-axe, except that aristocrats had better quality weapons and more complete armour. Warfare transformed during the Shang period. Aristocrats went from fighting on foot to fighting from chariots, and archery developed due to the introduction of the composite bow. The high levels of requisite training made warfare more socially stratified and gendered.

It was in the late Shang that bronze weapons became widely and more densely distributed, by replacing jade weapons in burials. The finding of bronze weapons are particularly concentrated around the capital of Anyang. In this period, burials of high-status individuals were stratified with complex schema involving subtly different styles of bronze weapons marking differences in status. The style of bronze weapons concentrated around the capital at Anyang were also found widely distributed across the Shang regions of control, and coexisted with smaller, regional styles that were limited to two or more individual areas.

The bronze foundries at the capital produced a variety of chariot fittings and weapons. The Shang dagger-axe was designed for hand-to-hand fighting on foot. Some 980 bronze arrowheads have been found, compared with 20,400 fashioned from bone. The Shang bow had a range of 60 to 70 m (200 to 230 ft). Some weapons were based on imported designs, such as the máo spearhead, which first appeared at Yinxu in period II and appears to have been developed in the Yangtze region, while daggers with animal-head pommels and some dagger-axes have precursors in Northern zone cultures.

Under the Shang, chariots were extremely ornate, used by high ranking elite as command and archery platforms. This differed from the Zhou when chariots were simpler and more common. The ratio of chariots to foot soldiers under the Shang is estimated to be 1 to 30, while under the Zhou it is estimated to be 1 to 10. However this was still limited as compared to the 1 to 5 in Ancient Egypt. While chariots had been used in battle in the Shang, only in the Western Zhou era were they used in large numbers. The Zhou conquest of the Shang may have been linked to their use of the chariot.

== Fortifications ==
Early Bronze Age Chinese cities were characterized by massive defensive walls. Starting from the 3rd Millennium BCE and throughout the 2nd Millennium BCE, there is a correlation between elite status and military status in tomb artefacts. Cities such as those found at Zhengzhou and Yanshi were built with an rammed-earth inner wall surrounding palatial structures and well-fortified multi-storied buildings believed to be state warehouses or arsenals, followed by an outer wall constructed later by extending one side of the existing walls to enclose craft production workshops. Smaller frontier citadels much smaller in size but similar in layout, structures, crafts and burials were also found in remote locations such as Yuanqu and Dongxiafeng in Shanxi, Fucheng and Mengzhuang in Henan, and Panlongcheng in Hubei. Bagley, Liu and Chen argue that rapid spread of cultural uniformity may indicate a sudden imperial expansion. These sites have high levels of continuity in style with the late Shang site at Anyang.

The massive fortifications of cities disappeared in the late Shang period, coinciding with the rise of the chariot.

== See also ==
- Shang dynasty
- Late Shang
- Military history of China before 1912

== Bibliography ==
- Ebrey, Patricia Buckley; Walthall, Anne; Palais, James (2006), East Asia: A Cultural, Social, and Political History, Boston: Houghton Mifflin Company, ISBN 0-618-13384-4.
- Keightley, David N. (2012), Working for His Majesty, Berkeley, California: Institute for East Asian Studies, ISBN 978-155729-156-1.
- ——— (1999), "The Shang: China's first historical dynasty", in Loewe, Michael; Shaughnessy, Edward L. (eds.), The Cambridge History of Ancient China, Cambridge: Cambridge University Press, pp. 232–291, doi:10.1017/CHOL9780521470308.006, ISBN 978-0-521-47030-8.
- Li, Feng (2013), Early China: a social and cultural history, New York: Cambridge University Press, ISBN 978-0-521-71981-0.
- Shaughnessy, Edward L. (1996), "Military histories of early China: a review article", Early China, 21: 159–182, doi:10.1017/S0362502800003436, JSTOR 23351734.
- Thorp, Robert L. (2006), China in the Early Bronze Age: Shang Civilization, University of Pennsylvania Press, ISBN 978-0-8122-3910-2.
- Wang Hongyuan (王宏源) (1993), 漢字字源入門 [The Origins of Chinese Characters], Beijing: Sinolingua, ISBN 978-7-800-52243-7.
