= Ritual and worship in the Shang dynasty =

Divination, sacrifice, and mortuary ritual of Bronze Age China

The ritual and worship in the Shang dynasty (c. 1600 – c. 1046 BC), the second royal dynasty of China, comprised the acts through which the Shang worshipped a pantheon of ancestral spirits, nature powers, and the high god Di. The principal acts were divination recorded on oracle bones and the sacrifice of animals and human victims, supplemented by a regular liturgical cycle of offerings, mortuary ritual, posthumous naming, spirit mediumship, and possibly pilgrimage. Almost everything known of these practices derives from oracle-bone inscriptions of the Late Shang period (c. 1250 – c. 1050 BC), supplemented by the archaeological remains of ritual activity.

These acts were scheduled by a sexagenary, or sixty-day, calendar and, in the Late Shang, were increasingly governed by a formalised liturgy of sacrifices to the royal ancestors. The king was the chief officiant, communicating with his most recent ancestors by offering sacrifices, they in turn giving access to more senior spirits and ultimately to Di. Divinations were recorded in a standard format of preface, charge, prognostication, and verification, while sacrifice ranged from offerings of grain, ale, and domestic animals to human sacrifice conducted on a large scale.

Shang religious practices were not static. Over the two centuries covered by the oracle bone inscriptions, divination and sacrifice were progressively regularised, until by the final reigns divination was largely confined to royal hunts and a fixed cycle of ancestral sacrifice.

== Nature of ritual ==
=== Conception ===
The inscriptional term feng (豊) expressed the Shang abstract concept of ritual. The resulting body of practice – divination, sacrifice, the healing of illness, and the casting of ritual bronzes – has been characterised as a "science" of the ancestors, meaning not a science in the modern sense but a systematic and impersonalised body of theology and technique through which the elite sought advantage and assurance against illness, the weather, and other uncertainties. (Note: Keightley uses "science" in the sense of a "systematic, coherent discourse about natural phenomena", following Nathan Sivin, and stresses that in early China "science and religion were inextricably entwined", describing the Shang enterprise as "a science of humans and ex-humans, not a science of things".) By this account the ancestral cult was the prime technology by which the Shang managed their world.

Ritual centred on communication with the spirit world, and the king was its essential intermediary. Through sacrifice he addressed his most recent ancestors, who could in turn reach more senior spirits and ultimately convey his requests to the high god Di. As the one figure able to divine the intent of the spirits, the king monopolised the mantic arts, and his capacity to do so lent religious and political legitimacy to his rule.

The cult was highly routinised. Each desired outcome was regarded as falling within the jurisdiction of a particular ancestor, who received a matching offering on a fixed schedule, a systematisation that has been described as bureaucratic. Over fifty distinct rituals have been identified in the oracle-bone inscriptions, and probably more went unrecorded.

=== Ritual calendar ===
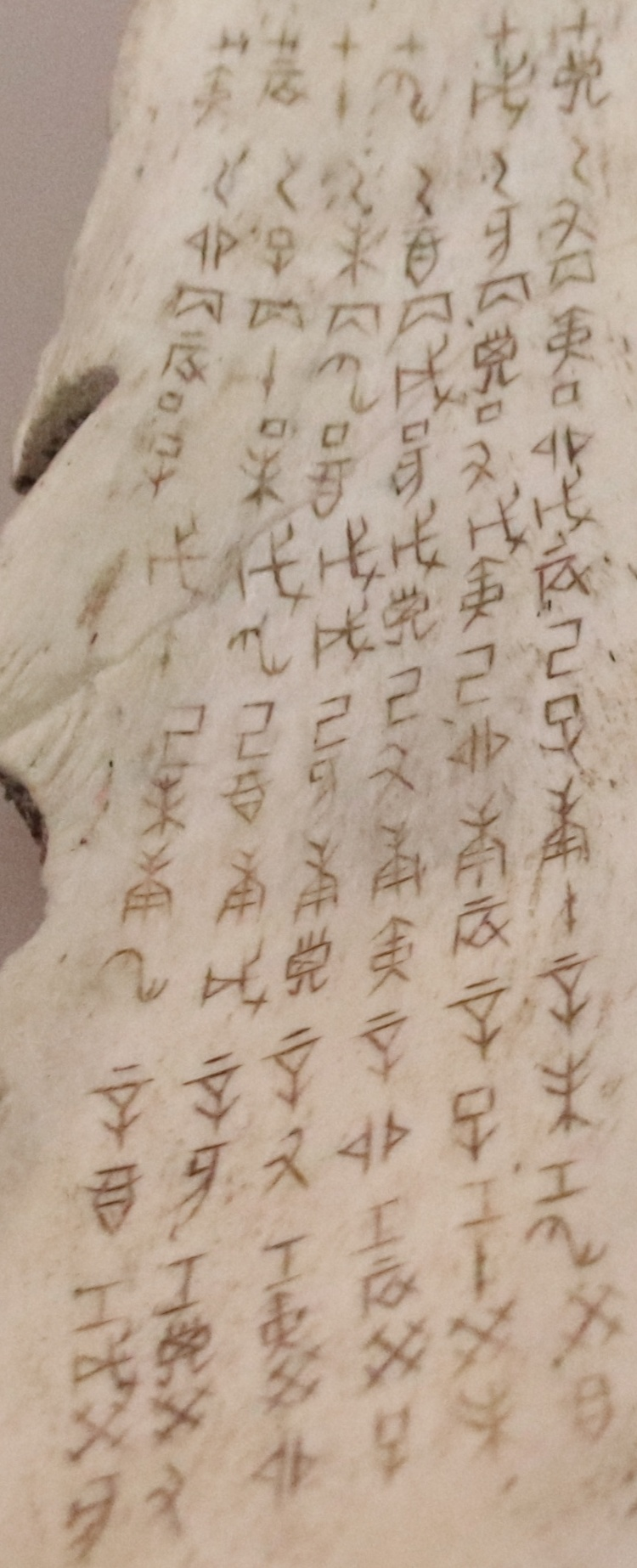
Table of Heavenly Stems from the reigns of the last two Shang kings, inscribed on a scapula

The scheduling of Shang rituals depended on a sexagenary, or sixty-day, calendar, in use from the earliest appearance of writing in China around 1250 BC. It combined two interlocking sequences, a cycle of ten terms – later known as the Heavenly Stems – and a cycle of twelve – later the Earthly Branches – which together yielded sixty distinct day-names, sixty being the lowest common multiple of ten and twelve. The ten-term cycle was the more fundamental of the two, functioning as a ten-day week that the Shang termed the xun (旬), and the sixty-day cycle was in turn understood as six such weeks.

The ten stems ran jia (甲), yi (乙), bing (丙), ding (丁), wu (戊), ji (己), geng (庚), xin (辛), ren (壬), and gui (癸). The twelve branches ran zi (子), chou (丑), yin (寅), mao (卯), chen (辰), si (巳), wu (午), wei (未), shen (申), you (酉), xu (戌), and hai (亥). The later correlation of the twelve branches with the animals of the Chinese zodiac is not attested within the first thousand years of the cycle's use. The concept of a seven-day week possibly also reached China during the reign of Zu Jia (12th century BC), although it was never adopted by the Shang.

The calendar was bound up with the ancestral cult. The ten stems were used to name the royal dead, every Shang king bearing a stem in his posthumous name, and the same terms underlay the schedule on which those ancestors received sacrifice. The stem in an ancestor's name was fixed, and it set the day of the ten-day week on which sacrifice was routinely offered to that spirit, so that the day-names primarily marked when an individual received cult.

Divination reinforced the rhythm of the week. On its final day the king performed the bu xun (卜旬), a divination as to whether the coming ten days would pass without misfortune. Because a full round of the developed sacrificial cycle approximated the solar year, the Shang came to reckon years by it, using the word si (祀) – literally a cycle of sacrifice – to mean "year". The count of sexagenary days itself ran on unbroken into later Chinese history, and the calendar structured the major religious observances of the Shang, above all those directed to the ancestors.

== Divination ==
=== Oracle bones ===
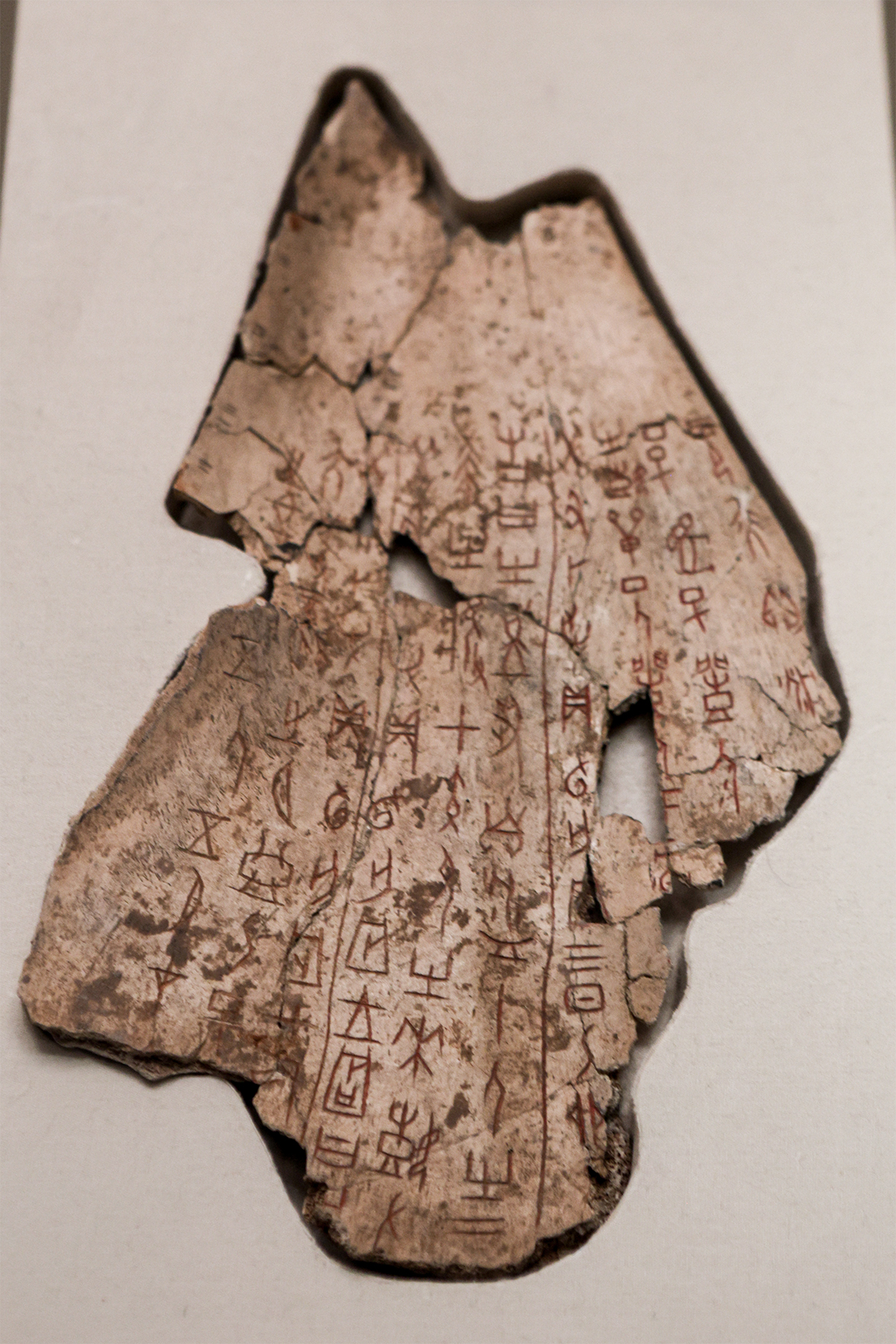
An oracle bone with divination records from the Late Shang

癸丑王卜貞：
On the day guichou, the king made cracks and divined:
旬亡禍。
"In the next ten days there will be no disasters."
王固曰吉。
The king read the cracks and said: "Auspicious".

— Divination during the reigns of Di Yi and Di Xin

The Shang practised a form of divination called pyromancy, the reading of cracks produced when bone or shell was exposed to heat, as a way of communicating indirectly with the spirits. Divination of this kind was far older than Shang writing and reached back to Neolithic scapulimancy, but only in the Late Shang were the divinations recorded in inscriptions, and even then the inscribed bones make up less than a tenth of the surviving corpus. The oldest divinatory inscriptions date to around 1250 BC, though the script itself is probably older. (Note: Twenty-six oracle bones from the era of Wu Ding have been dated to 1254 – 1197 BC, with the oldest dated to 1254 – 1221 BC within a confidence level of 80–90%.) The inscriptions also imply some engagement with divination using polygrams alongside the burning of bone.

The principal media were the shoulder blades of cattle and the plastrons of turtles, with the scapulae of other animals and turtle carapaces used less often. Traces of pens possibly used to keep turtles have been found at Yinxu. Cattle scapulae became the dominant medium of the Late Shang, harder to burn than smaller bones but justified by their standing in ritual and sacrifice. Each bone or shell was prepared first. A scapula had its ridge and part of its socket sawn away and its surface levelled, and a plastron was cut from the carapace, stripped of its horny outer plates, and smoothed, so that the cracks would show clearly on the front and the surface could be written on.

A series of hollows was then bored or chiselled into the back of the bone or shell. These thinned it and fixed the place, shape, and direction of the crack to come, and it is this ordered array of hollows that sets Shang pyromancy apart from the free-form burning of the Neolithic. At the moment of divination the diviner proposed the charge and applied an intense, rounded heat source to a hollow, charring the bone until a crack of a bu (卜) shape formed on the front. The cracks were read as the response of the spirits, and a scribe then incised the interpretation onto the bone.

Divination usually took place in temples, though it could also be conducted away from the ritual centres. Once a bone had served its purpose it was stripped of its divine qualities and buried in a pit.

=== Inscription content ===
A full record could hold as many as six elements, though rarely all at once. A preface gave the cyclical day of the divination and the diviner's name, and at times the place, while a postface might add the place, the month, or the number of the sacrificial cycle. The charge followed, and after it, where present, came a crack number, a crack notation, the king's prognostication, and a verification.

The charges were not questions but wishes, forecasts, or statements of intent with which the bone was charged. They were often set out as matched positive and negative propositions, a form that mirrored the complementary cast of Shang belief. The divination quoted above shows the pattern in brief, for on the day guichou the king cracked the bone and proposed that the coming ten days would bring no disaster, then read the cracks as auspicious.

A single charge was often answered not by one crack but by a series of them, made across several hollows and read together as a set. The cracks were numbered in the order they were made, and a crack notation carved beside a crack recorded how it had been read, though notations judged inauspicious were left off the bone. The same divination could also be repeated on one bone, its instances set in order by the dates recorded.

The diviners cracked the bones, but the prognostication of the outcome was the king's, introduced by the formula "the king, reading the cracks, said". A verification might then record what came to pass, as when a forecast of rain was followed by the note that "on renwu it really did rain". Both are uncommon, and most surviving inscriptions preserve only the preface and charge. (Note: The decision to record a verification usually indicates that the matter divined was of real importance to the Shang state. Prognostications are similarly scarce; only about 1.2 per cent of the Bin-group divinations contain one.) The king's occasional ability to foretell specific events weeks in advance was among the skills that lent authority to his rule. A single record from the reign of Wu Ding runs through the whole sequence.

[Preface:] Crack-making on guisi (day 40), Que divined: "In the next ten days there will be no disasters." [Prognostication:] "There will be calamities; there may be someone bringing alarming news." [Verification:] When it came to the fifth day, dingyou [day 34], there really was someone bringing alarming news from the west. Guo of Zhi [a Shang general] reported and said: "The Tufang [an enemy country] have attacked in our eastern borders and have seized two settlements." The Gongfang (another enemy country) likewise invaded the fields of our western borders.

— Divination of the reign of Wu Ding, Heji 6057

Divination was less an attempt to foretell the future than a means of ensuring that a proposed course of action would not bring catastrophes, and many charges close with the standing phrase that "there will be no disaster". Its recurring subjects were sacrifice, by far the most frequent, together with warfare, hunting, royal excursions, the ten-day week, the coming day or night, the weather, agriculture and the harvest, the king's sickness, childbirth, and tribute, as well as appeals for the assistance of the spirits. (Note: Many divinations were 'divining for the week ahead' (卜旬; bǔ xún), forecasting the ten-day week to come.) Divinations about attack from outside, for instance, are absent from Yinxu Period V, when the Shang held only a small and stable territory. Others addressed public works and royal commissions, such as the walling of cities and the mobilising of labour.

=== Diviners ===
Three kinds of diviner have been distinguished, those named in the king's service, those working for the nobility, and those who met the needs of the wider public. The distinction was visible in the bones themselves, for those used at court were carefully thinned and polished and bore symmetrical rows of paired hollows, while the bones of nobles and of public diviners were more roughly prepared and their divinations generally left uninscribed. The confinement of literate divination to the court expressed the elite's monopoly over an important form of ritual knowledge.

About one hundred and twenty diviners are named across the inscriptions, though the bulk of royal divination was the work of a handful. They fell into schools and groups set apart by their script and their concerns, the most active under Wu Ding being the Bin group, whose sixteen or more diviners included Bin, Que, Zheng, Nei, and Gu. Other groups of the kings' school were the Chu, He, and Huang groups of the northern branch and the Li group of the southern.

Divinations made for people other than the king are rare, amounting to under five per cent of the surviving inscriptions, and they are grouped into several types such as the Zi-group of the princes. Most belong to the reign of Wu Ding.

The fullest of them is the archive from Huayuanzhuang East, some 2,452 divination records on 529 shells and bones, discovered in 1991 and produced under the patronage of a royal prince during Wu Ding's reign. The prince was almost certainly a son of Wu Ding and Lady Hao, and the ancestors he most honoured were his grandparents, the earlier king Xiao Yi and his consort, while the absence of offerings to his own parents' generation shows that both were still living. His scribes wrote in a hand distinct enough to form a recognised "HuaDong" type, dated to the middle and later part of the reign. The day-to-day divining was carried out by a small and unnamed body of diviners and scribes rather than the couple of dozen once assumed, though the prince himself sometimes divined and read the cracks.

Some divinations belonged to a third, public tradition, conducted with little preparation and without inscriptions, which suggests that literate divination was restricted to a small circle of royals and elites held to be in contact with the spirits. A few divinations once identified as public may in fact belong to the royal tradition.

=== Development ===
Pyromancy changed considerably over its long history. Its earliest, pre-Shang forms burned bones that had not been prepared in any way, but from the early Bronze Age diviners began to bore hollows into them to control where they would crack, and by the end of the Shang most oracle bones were pretreated in highly standardised ways, with cattle scapulae and turtle shell the usual media. This progressive elaboration, together with the restriction of the inscribed form to the court, made divination a source of state power.

The practice also contracted. In the first two periods the named court diviners divined across weather, harvest, warfare, sickness, and sacrifice, but their role fell away thereafter, and by the last period the king was virtually the only diviner and prognosticator on record. The range of subjects narrowed with it, until in the final reigns divination was largely confined to sacrifice, the ten-day week, and the royal hunt.

By the final reigns the character of divination had changed again. Di and the nature powers, so prominent under Wu Ding, had all but vanished from the record, and the divinations turned overwhelmingly to the scheduled cult of the royal ancestors. The practice had grown more systematic and less searching, and its prognostications were now uniformly brief and optimistic, a change that matched the rising confidence of kings at the head of an increasingly routine administration. In the last two reigns the living were thought ever more able to manage the world without appeal to Di and the spirits.

== Sacrifice ==
=== Recipients ===
The Shang sacrificed regularly to please the spirits and to seek their blessings, and the practice carried a strong element of ritual violence. Offerings served a wide range of ends, among them prayers for rain, harvest, safe birth, and help in war, exorcisms to drive off hostile spirits, and announcements to the ancestors of the king's plans and health.

Sacrifice to the royal ancestors was the central obligation of the king, who sustained the dynastic line by hosting his forebears in turn according to their seniority and drew strength from them in return. The cult was bureaucratic in cast, for each desired outcome fell within the jurisdiction of a particular ancestor, who required his own sacrificial package. By the eleventh century BC these offerings had become a daily duty, so tightly scheduled that a single bone might be reserved for charges about one ritual alone. The demand for sacrificial materials was heavy enough to spur technological and economic change in Shang society.

=== Offerings ===
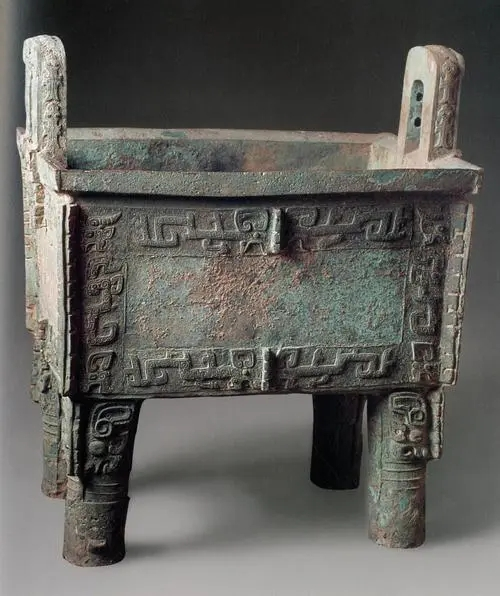
The Houmuwu ding, dimensions 133 cm × 110 cm × 79.2 cm (52.4 in × 43.3 in × 31.2 in), commissioned by Zu Geng to commemorate his deceased mother – National Museum of China, Beijing

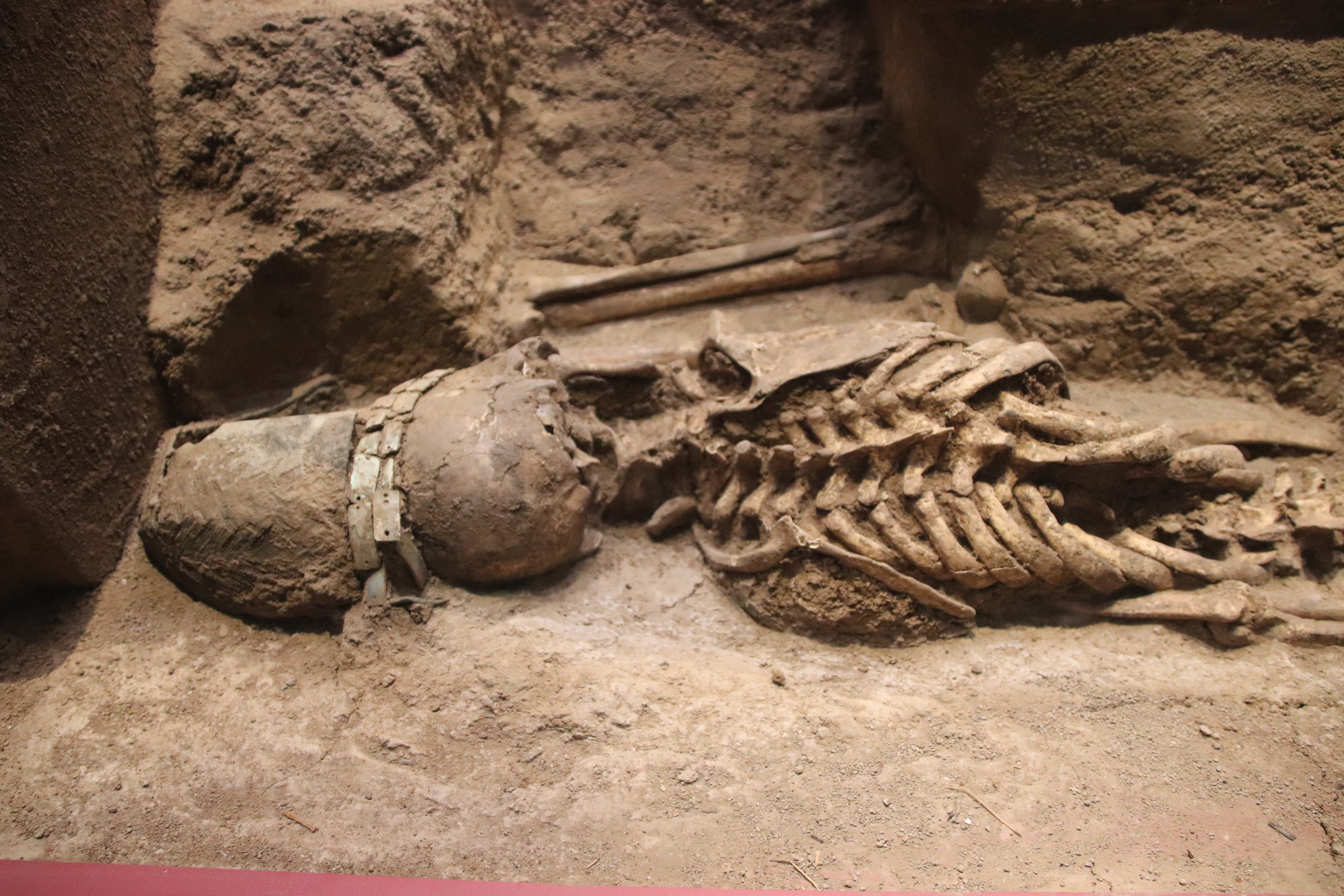
Human skeleton at Yinxu, sacrificed together with a chariot burial

What the Shang offered to the spirits ranged from grain and ale through domestic animals to human victims. Ale was a routine part of the cult, and millet and other grains were presented alongside the animals.

Non-living offerings were mainly bones, stones, and bronzes. Bones came as hairpins or arrowheads, or as ivory in elite tombs. Jade ritual objects have been discovered in the Tomb of Fu Hao. Bronzes were offered as vessels bearing short inscriptions, such as the ding (鼎), access to which seemed to be granted only to the king and the heirs who took part in the rituals. The Shang also used ceramics whose designs were inherited from earlier cultures.

Animals were the staple offering, given to the royal ancestors and the nature powers alike. The commonest were cattle, sheep, pigs, and dogs, oxen being valued most highly and horses reserved for special occasions. Wild animals taken in the hunt, among them boar and deer, were offered as well. They might be given singly or in great numbers, with divinations proposing tens or even hundreds of cattle at a time, and the number pledged was often far larger than the number actually killed. Pigs were especially frequent in the Early Shang, and dogs served flexibly as food for the ancestors or as attendants to follow their masters in death.

The colour of an animal was a deliberate criterion of choice, and the inscriptions repeatedly divine about the hue of the victim. White oxen were reserved for the highest ancestors, yellow oxen for the powers of the earth and the four directions, and multicoloured oxen for the offering of blood in prayers for harvest. In rites to bring rain, black and white sheep were set against one another, and over the course of the dynasty the favoured colour shifted from white toward red. (Note: In the non-kings' divinations black animals held a special place in the cult of female ancestors.)

Much attention was paid to the shedding of blood, which was held to purify. Victims were variously burned, buried whole in pits, drowned in rivers, or cut apart, the animal and human offerings often dismembered together.

In the grave, animal offerings were distinguished by their completeness and their position. Cuts of meat, chiefly the limbs and ribs of cattle, sheep, and pigs, were laid in vessels or on the ledge of the tomb near the head of the dead, usually on the right, while whole animals were placed on the ledge, in the earth fill, or in a small pit beneath the body. The animal in this waist-pit was almost always a single dog, an offering akin to those set beneath the foundations of buildings, while the others served as companions or as marks of wealth. Whether a burial held whole limbs at all reflected the rank of its owner, and the larger the tomb the more likely it was to contain any animal offering.

Human sacrifice was practised on a large scale, bound up with the Shang belief in an afterlife in which the dead kept their rank and their dependents. The inscriptions record at least 14,197 human victims, with 1,145 of such inscriptions attesting to sacrifices without giving exact numbers. A single ritual could claim hundreds of victims at once.

Most victims were young men, generally decapitated or dismembered, and largely prisoners taken from enemy states, offered alongside the animals. The greatest number were Qiang (羌), captured in war or sent as tribute by subject neighbours, and women were among those killed, though rarely more than thirty on one occasion. The manner of killing varied with the recipient, so that victims were drowned for the River Power, buried alive for the Earth Power, dismembered for the wind spirits, and burned for the powers of the sky.

=== Terminology ===
The inscriptions preserve a rich sacrificial vocabulary, distinguishing the general kinds of human offering, the categories of victim, and the manner of the killing. Among the methods, liáo, mǎo, chén, and dà yù formed a group of exorcist sacrifices performed to counter hostile forces, and the verb yòng, 'to use' a victim, survived into later texts as yòngrén, 'to use humans'.

Selected sacrificial terms in the oracle-bone inscriptions
Term	Script	Type	Sense
rénshēng	人牲	category	humans offered in sacrifice
rénxùn	人殉	category	humans killed to accompany the dead
nǚ	女	victim	females
qī	妻	victim	dependent women
qiè	妾	victim	maidservants
xiǎochén	小臣	victim	minor servants, even minor officers
fú	俘	victim	captives of war
wū	巫	victim	spirit mediums, at times burned for rain
dòu	豆	method	killing of humans in bronze vessels
shān	刪	method	a single human sacrifice
shì	氏	method	a ritualised offering at a temple
liáo	燎	method	burning
mǎo	卯	method	splitting
chén	沉	method	drowning
dà yù	大禦	method	great exorcism
yòng	用	method	using a victim

=== The five-ritual cycle ===
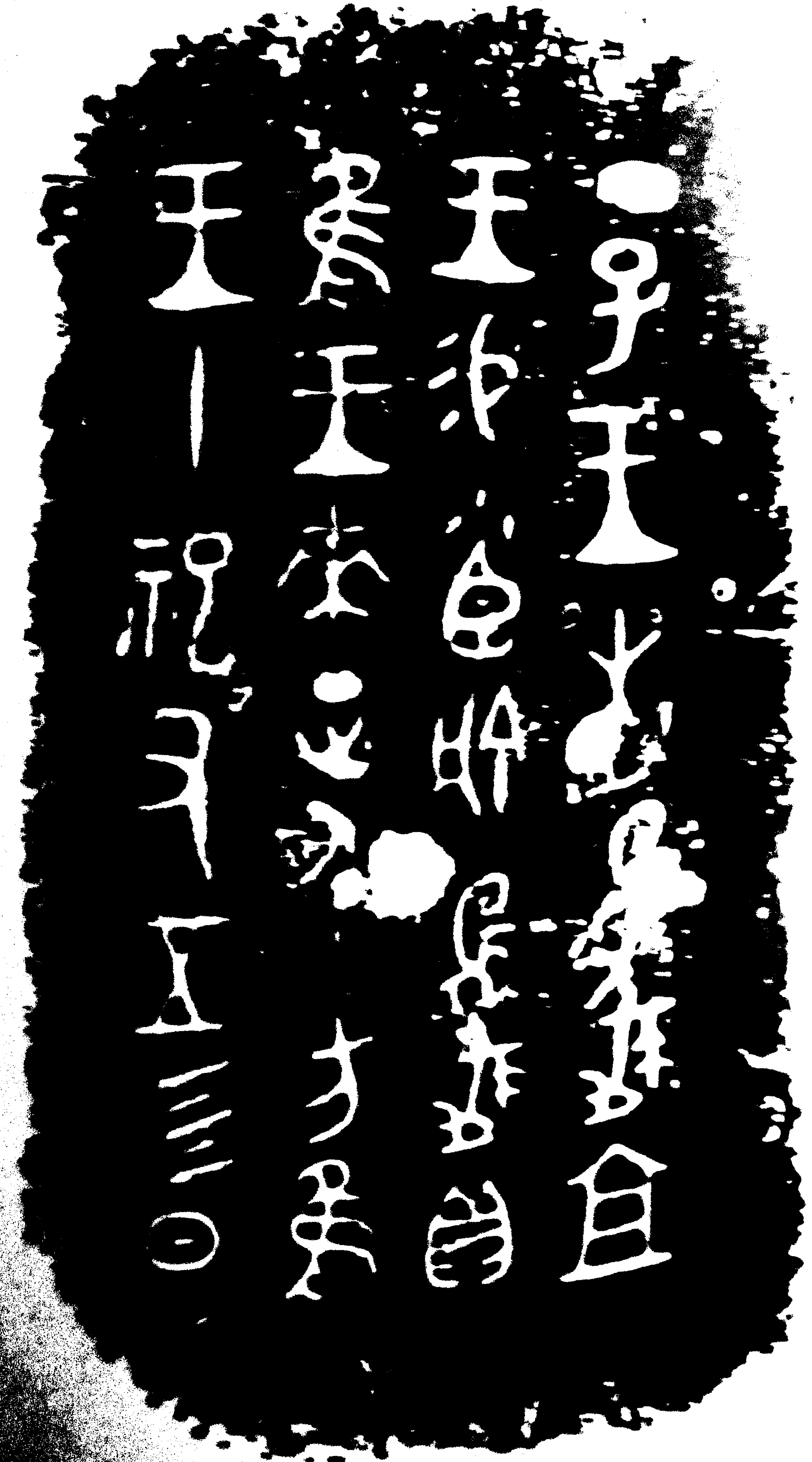
Rubbing of the four columns of the inscription on the Xiao Chen Yu zun

Late Shang cult was built around a cyclical roster of five rituals, offered one after another to the ancestral kings in the order of their succession and to the consorts of the main line. The five were yi (翌), ji (祭), zai (洅), xie (劦), and yong (肜), run in that order and then begun again. Each recipient received a ritual on the day of the ten-day week that matched the stem in his or her temple-name, so that the schedule was set by the names of the dead themselves. A queen was fitted into the first free day after her husband, and only the consorts of main-line kings were included. The roster began with Shang Jia, the earliest ancestor to bear a day-name.

Each ritual was carried through the whole line of ancestors before the next began, a single round of one ritual taking eleven ten-day weeks, including a preparatory week known as the gongdian. Staggered together, the five made up a full cycle of thirty-six ten-day weeks, or three hundred and sixty days, close to the solar year, and an occasional inserted rest week brought it nearer three hundred and seventy. On the last day of each week the king divined about the week ahead to confirm its offerings. Because a completed round approximated a year, it came to serve as the unit of the year itself, and the word si meant both a cycle of sacrifice and a year.

The regular roster is firmly attested only from the reign of Zu Jia, and though it later grew to take in further kings it was never carried past a certain point. Its reconstruction has allowed modern scholars to recover the Shang king-list and to test the traditional chronology. The same terms could appear in more secular settings, as in a bronze inscription of the Late Shang:

隹王來征人方；
It was when the king returned from marching to regulate the Renfang;
隹王十祀又五肜日
It was the king's fifteenth ritual cycle, (the time of) the yong-day rituals.

— Xiao Chen Yu zun

Beyond the fixed round the kings offered occasional sacrifices to ancestors who had brought them misfortune, and supplementary rites such as ale offerings might be made on the eve of one of the five ceremonies. Because of the dynasty's fall the last two kings received no sacrifice.

== Shamanism ==
Oracle bone script character denoting wu

The inscriptions record rituals of communication with the spirit world, among them yi (異) and bin (賓). The graph yi shows a masked human figure with arms raised, and it denoted a ritual metamorphosis in which the performer was empowered by, and identified with, the spirit shown in the mask. Through it a person passed for a time out of the human world and into that of the spirits or the wild animals, as when the king performed yi before a hunt to take on the power of his quarry. The rite was a royal prerogative, open only to the king, living or dead, and to Di, and the same masked, metamorphic image fills the animal masks of Shang bronze art. In the bin rite the king, or sometimes an ancestral spirit, played host to a spirit guest, receiving Di, an ancestor, or a nature power such as the River, at times to a practical end such as bringing rain. A pair of charges has the king host the ancestral kings on the days that bore their names:

Crack-making on jiayin (day 51), Yin divined: "The king hosts (bin 賓) Da Jia (the third king), performs the yong 肜 ritual, no fault…" Crack-making on gengshen (day 57), Yin divined: "The king hosts Da Geng (the fifth king; next on the main line of descent), performs the yong ritual, no fault…"

— Divinations hosting the royal ancestors, Heji 22723

The later notion that the host impersonated the guest through a proxy belongs to Zhou practice and is not attested for the Shang.

Elizabeth Childs-Johnson also identifies several rituals that might account for the king's role, in her interpretation, as shaman-priest. Notably, she reads the Shang graph zhu (祝) as "to invoke or to conjure the ancestor spirit donning a ghost head", positing that this rite belongs to a shamanic tradition. Childs-Johnson further decomposes a related graph, attested occasionally during the early Yinxu period, into components denoting "a kneeling figure wearing a spirit mask in front of either an altar, wine container, wine droplets, or a bound bundle of fragrant grasses, signifying sacrificial offerings of the kneeling propitiant". Examining the temporal switch from this graph to zhu at roughly the same time as the five-sacrifices schedule institution, Childs-Johnson argues that the Shang experienced a de-emphasis on "pure" shamanism, replacing it by a form of shamanism integrated with royal ancestor worship.

The inscriptions also name figures read as the wu (巫), whose nature is disputed and not fully understood. They seem to have mediated between the human and spirit worlds through prayer and astrology, though in another reading the oracle-bone graph names directional spirit-powers of the late Shang, distinct from the later Chinese wu, which were bound up with wind and rain and received sacrifice. The office could be held by non-Shang people, and has been linked to that of the Zoroastrian magus, an oracular and ritual expert who dealt with the spirits without trance or mediation. (Note: Victor H. Mair identified the Old Chinese pronunciation of wu as m^{y}ag, on the transcriptions of Bernhard Karlgren, Zhou Fagao, Li Fang-kuei, and Axel Schuessler.)

Whether such practices amount to shamanism has been debated. Childs-Johnson describes yi as an institutionalised spirit-metamorphism, the nearest thing in the inscriptions to the shamanic altering of one's state, though set within the literate Shang state rather than the ecstatic tradition of Siberia. Kwang-chih Chang went further, holding the king to be the chief shaman of a fundamentally shamanistic religion, while David Keightley doubted the identification, finding no sign of the ecstasy or in-body commingling that shamanism proper requires, and declined to read the wu as shamans.

More recent work has found no firm evidence for shamanism in royal Shang religion. Its art and burials are held to have been read shamanically on assumption rather than proof, and the court is said to have known no spiritual journeys or possession by spirits, working instead through ritual and oracular specialists and the hosting of the ancestral and natural powers that made up Di.

On this account the shamanic model reads later Zhou practice back into an earlier age, and Shang religion was oriented instead on the high god Di and the powers of the north celestial pole, from which the king's authority to rule was held to flow.

== Mortuary practice ==
=== Tombs ===
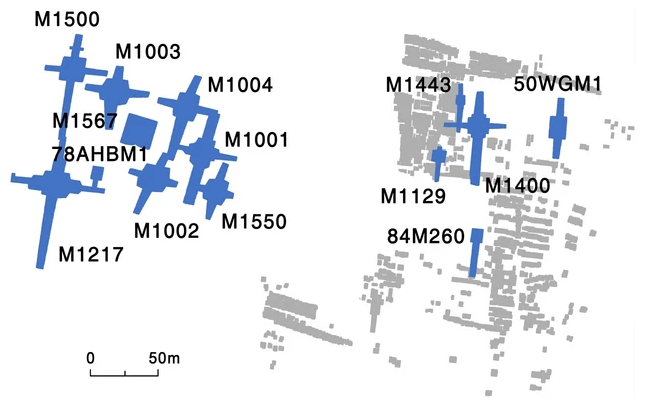
Map of the Xibeigang cemetery, with royal tombs in blue

No royal tombs survive from the Early Shang, and most burials of the period were small, scattered graves of little elaboration. In the Late Shang a royal cemetery took shape at Xibeigang, north of the capital, laid out according to Shang cosmology and divided into a western and an eastern zone. It held nine royal tombs, seven of them in the western zone, though not that of Fu Hao, which lay within the palace complex; all had been looted in antiquity, which has frustrated their attribution to particular kings.

A reconstruction of the cemetery's growth has since placed the great tombs in order and matched them to the royal line, following the changing style of the carved ritual spatulas laid in each grave. The plan traced the descent of that line. The eastern zone was the older, holding two-ramp tombs that reached back to the Middle Shang and serving as the ancestral ground, where a continuous run of sacrificial pits marked the offerings made there across the reigns.

The western zone was opened as a new royal ground under Wu Ding, and his sons and their successors were buried there while rites to the ancestors continued in the east. Wu Ding himself was laid among the ancestors in the eastern zone, honoured as founder of the new dynasty and as heir to the Middle Shang kings before him. Each new grave was sited to make a statement about its occupant, set to face and honour an earlier tomb, to turn its back on one, or to pair with it as an equal, so that the cemetery mapped the standing of the kings within the line.

The last of the royal tombs, ascribed to Wen Wu Ding, was the largest in the reach of its ramps and was cut in the form of the oldest royal tombs, a revival of the old order as royal power waned shortly before the dynasty fell. The sequence has told against an earlier reading by Kwang-chih Chang, who held that the tombs answered to two royal descent groups supplying the throne in alternation, for they were not built by turns between the two zones.

A royal tomb was a deep vertical shaft, as much as thirteen metres deep, with a wooden burial chamber at the bottom and, beneath the chamber floor, a small waist-pit holding an armed man and a dog. The largest tombs were approached by four ramps set in a cross, and a ledge, the ercengtai, was raised by packing earth between the chamber and the walls of the shaft. The dead were oriented consistently from the Early to the Late period, at a deviation of ten to twenty degrees east of north.

The ramps served the funeral more than the digging of the tomb, for it was down them that the shaft was filled, in layers of pounded earth, grave goods, and sacrifices. A tomb might be prepared before or after the king's death, while his coffin and furnishings were made elsewhere; he was laid supine in the wooden chamber, the guardians were buried in the shaft floor, and the earth packed around the chamber carried offerings before the whole was sealed. The closing of such a tomb was a protracted rite involving many people, and a lavish funeral let a new king assert his legitimacy. Smaller tombs held the political elite, among them the family grave of a diviner.

After a funeral the kin of the dead feasted at the graveside, a rite thought to turn the deceased into a new ancestral spirit. Remains of shrines, and perhaps an offering hall, have been found at Xibeigang, so that the cemetery served for ritual even to ancestors not buried there.

=== Grave goods ===
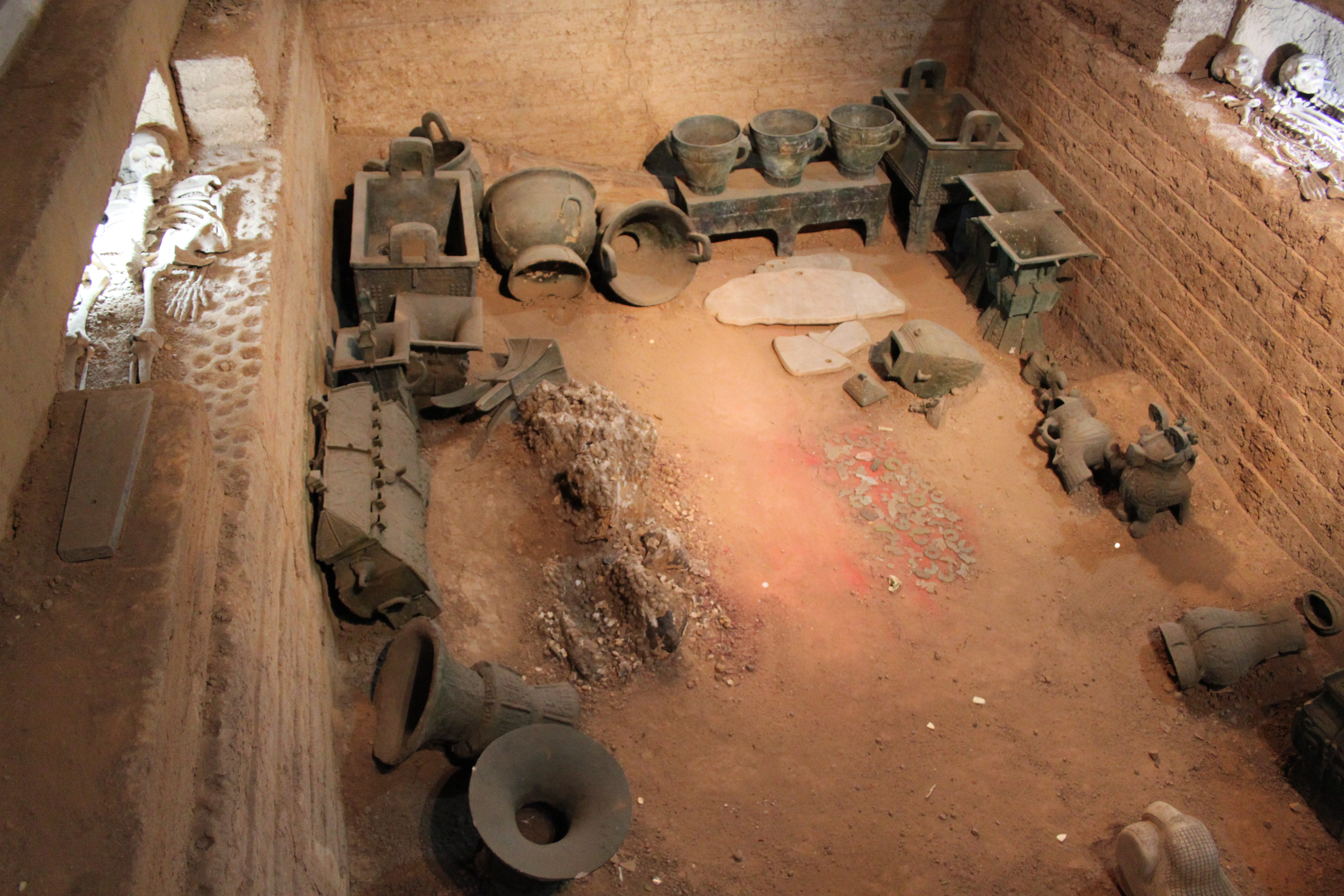
The Tomb of Fu Hao, dedicated to the principal queen of the Shang dynasty during the 13th century BC, enriched with artefacts and human sacrifice

Early Shang graves held bronzes and ceramics, though many had neither. The Late-period royal tombs were furnished lavishly, with bronze vessels and weapons, jades, chariot fittings, and animal and human attendants to accompany the king. A single ramp of one Xibeigang tomb yielded chariot fittings, more than a hundred bronze helmets, and scores of bronze blades and spearheads. Elite tombs held ceramics, bronzes, and farming tools but often no coffin, and weapons appear in graves of both periods, pointing to a warrior elite.

The scale of the royal wealth is shown by the Tomb of Fu Hao, the only Anyang royal tomb found intact. Though small and without ramps, it held more than four hundred bronzes weighing over 1.5 tonnes, some seven hundred jades, and thousands of cowrie shells, together with a pair of axes bearing Fu Hao's name that may have served to behead victims.

=== Human victims ===
The royal tombs were filled with the dead as well as with goods. In the largest, pits in the floor and corners each held an armed man, a dog, and a ge blade, taken for guardians, and further victims lay in the fill and along the ramps. Those buried whole, laid out with ornaments of jade and turquoise, are read as followers or servants of the king, while the others, teenage men with their hands bound, had been led to the ramps in rows and beheaded. Even the intact Tomb of Fu Hao held sixteen human victims, and pits around the great tombs held further people, along with horses in their harness and even elephants with their keepers.

Human sacrifice at Anyang was directed above all to the mortuary cult of the kings, and the funeral offerings were only the first of a continuing series that each reigning king supplied to his predecessors. More than 1,200 sacrificial burials have been excavated at Xibeigang, most of them young men, the largest episodes accounting for hundreds at a time and falling chiefly under Wu Ding and his immediate successors. Unlike the royal dead, these victims were laid east–west, some of them headless, and are now thought to have been sacrificed after the funerals rather than during them.

== Posthumous naming ==
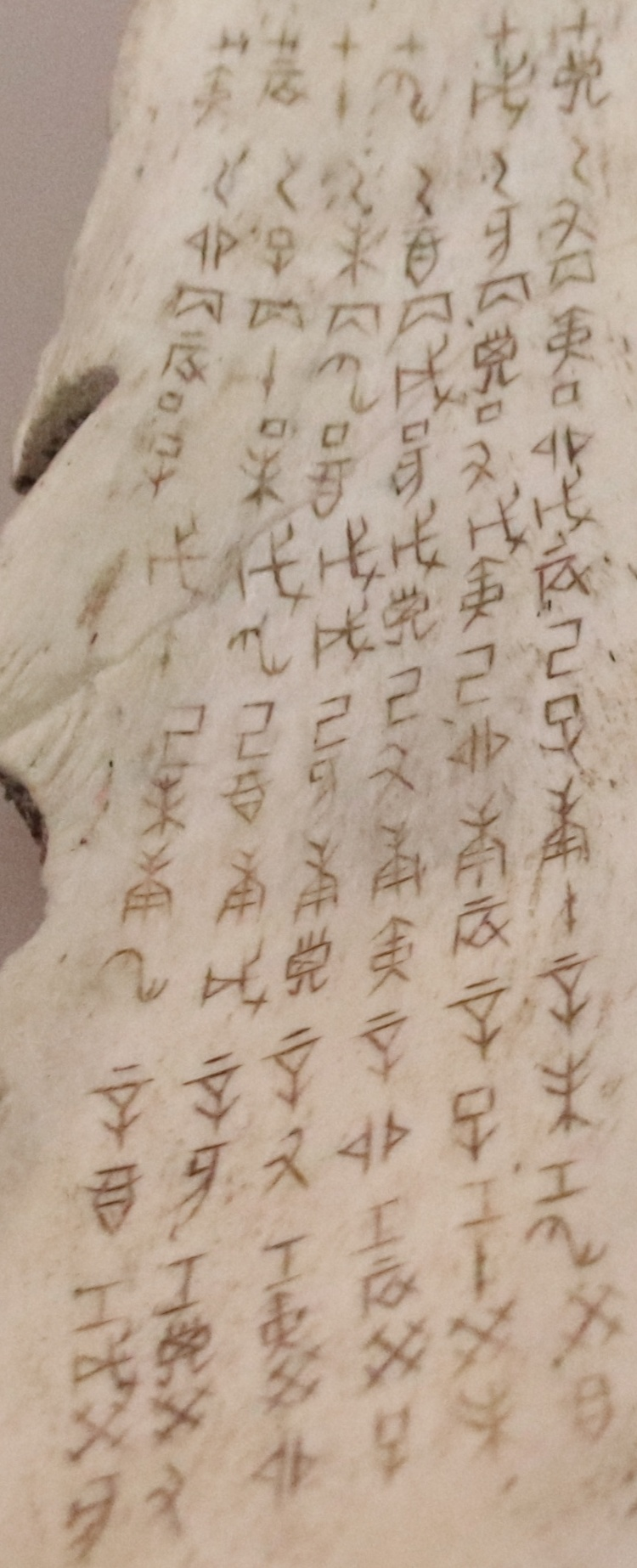
Table of Heavenly Stems from the reigns of the last two Shang kings, inscribed on a scapula

=== Stem-names ===
Every Shang ancestor spirit bore a posthumous name built from one of the ten Heavenly Stems of the ritual week. These day-names, or temple-names – riming (日名) and miaohao (廟號) – were given only after death, and no other early Chinese king-list shares the trait, a measure of how closely the Shang bound themselves to the cyclical terms. The sole exception to the convention is Wang Hai (王亥), the ancestor-like Former Lord whose name carries the twelfth Earthly Branch in place of a stem.

Early attempts to account for the names took them for birth days, or for the tablets that stood for the dead in the ancestral temple. The spread of the names tells against any such reading, for even-numbered stems are far more common than odd, making up some six in seven of the male names, a pattern first remarked by Kwang-chih Chang and hard to square with an evenly distributed quantity like a date of birth or death. The choice favoured a few stems in particular, yi, ding, and jia for male ancestors and xin, ren, and gui for ancestresses.

David Nivison has instead tied the stem to the calendar of the reign, taking a king's day-name from the sexagenary day that opened his reckoned first year. On this account a handful of rules shaped the result, for no king took the stem gui, which had belonged to the founder's father and stayed taboo thereafter, and no two kings in succession bore the same stem, so that where a rule would have repeated the previous reign's stem or fallen on gui the naming moved to the king's accession year or on to jia.

By a further account the names were fixed after death by divination. A single royal funeral survives in the divination record, that of a queen, whose day-name was settled by divining and whose later offerings duly fell on the day it named. Divination allowed the blend of fixed rule, chance, and human hand that the patterning of the names implies, though nothing shows the name was tied to any one moment of the funeral.

How the particular stem was chosen is still not understood, and no explanation has won general acceptance. One much-discussed proposal held the royal house to be divided into ten descent groups named for the ten days, the throne passing among them in turn, but it accords neither with the received royal genealogy nor with the uneven spread of the names, and has been set aside.

The stem in a spirit's name fixed the day of the ten-day week on which it routinely received sacrifice, so that in a sample of ninety dates Zu Yi was given his offerings on an yi day fifty-three times. The choice of day may itself have answered to the sacrificial calendar, spacing the ancestors across the week at a workable rhythm, since the same stem was never given to two kings in succession, which would have left their shared week thinly filled. A king and his wives were treated as a set, the wives placed on later days of the week than his own and never on his day.

Posthumous names of some kings might be related to Shang cosmology, especially names with stems jia, ding and yi, which were probably projections of the celestial square. As such, the spirits referred to by these stem-names became perceived as powerful gods whose will significantly affected the living realm.

=== Kinship prefixes ===
Because there were more spirits than stems, the Shang set epithet-like prefixes before the names. A prefix marked the spirit's relationship to the reigning king and so turned on who was making the offering, while the stem in the name held fixed. The kinship terms reached more widely than their English counterparts, and the recipients of cult were by no means all ancestors in the strict sense, taking in brothers, uncles, and great-uncles with their wives, the term used falling out by the recipient's generation and sex.

1. Relatives senior to the reigning king by two or more generations were referred to as zu (祖; 'grandfather', 'great uncle') and bi (妣; 'grandmother', 'great aunt').
2. Relatives of the generation prior to the reigning king were referred to as fu (父; 'father', 'uncle') and mu (母; 'mother', 'aunt'). For example, the sons of the then-ancestor Wu Ding referred to him as 'Father Ding' (父丁; Fù Dīng). Reigning kings sometimes replaced fu with di (帝), the name of the High God, to refer to their deceased fathers.
3. For relatives of the same generation, only the graph for males has been attested, which is xiong (兄; 'older brother', 'cousin').
4. Spouses of the reigning king were referred to as fu (婦).
5. Sons and nephews of the reigning king were referred to as zi (子). Some interpret this word as the royal surname, while others interpret it as a designation of the eldest son who led a family. It can be also be translated as 'lord'.

Other prefixes applied to Shang names include Da (大; 'greater') and Xiao (小; 'smaller'), which were used to differentiate mainline and collateral spirits sharing the same stem-name, and there are three kings – Jian Jia, Qiang Jia and Yang Jia – whose prefixes are of uncertain meaning. Since ancestors' posthumous names varied with their generational relationship with the worshipper, some ancestors received multiple posthumous names. The Former Lords such as Yi Yin seemed to possess implicit posthumous names not reflected by their appellations in Shang inscriptions.

== Pilgrimage ==
The Shang may also have taken part in pilgrimage. Clusters of buried bronzes and jades mark out remote places set apart for ritual on the edges of their world, in the Daling River valley of the north-east near Chifeng, at Hanzhong and on the Chengdu Plain of Sichuan to the south-west, and in the middle Yangtze to the south. These lay far from any settlement, at thresholds where the ordinary bounds of a people gave way to a ritual order tied to the landscape, so that a single place might be claimed at once by several groups, each pressing its own right to the power that dwelt there. Local religious leaders and the envoys of the Shang, the Zhou, and other powers are thought to have gathered at them to offer gifts and sacrifice, drawing on a way of engaging the sacred landscape with jade and metal that reached back to the Longshan age.

In the Daling valley, some 850 km (530 mi) north-east of Anyang, half a dozen hoards of large bronze vessels were sunk into pits cut in the bedrock of ridge-tops above the river, close to the ancient ritual centres of Niuheliang and Dongshanzui. Their inscriptions name Shang states and, later, the Zhou state of Yan among the patrons, so the rite carried on unbroken through the fall of one dynasty and the rise of the next. Far to the south-west, a stretch of the Han River at Hanzhong held some thirty-three hoards on high terraces and raised earthen mounds, the vessels arranged in the order of the rites performed over them. Barely a tenth of the bronzes were of Shang make, the rest local or hybrid, and many had been kept for generations before they were buried.

The richest deposits lay in Sichuan. In two pits at Sanxingdui and in the riverside offerings at the Jinsha site, some 1,500 km (930 mi) south-west of Anyang, the people of the Chengdu plain left charred bone and elephant ivory, gold and bronze masks, bronze trees and life-sized figures, and a wealth of jade, though the ding vessel that stood for kingship in the Shang world was pointedly absent. Kneeling bronze figures there hold jade zhang sceptres, and sceptres engraved with the image of their own dedication on a hillside tie the offerings to the landscape itself.

Some 1,000 km (620 mi) south of Anyang, in the middle Yangtze, fine Shang vessels and bells were buried on slopes above the rivers or sunk in the water near Tanheli, and Mount Wei may have served the local people as a place of pilgrimage and the Shang as a southern sacred mountain. River confluences and the gaps where water cut through the hills recur as the chosen spots, a pattern older than the Shang. Through such offerings the local polities and the Shang and Zhou courts reached the powers of an imagined domain, in a network of holy places that ran well beyond the lands any of them ruled, and the knowledge of where these places lay and how to approach their spirits belonged to the ideology of early kingship.
