= Yong (diviner) =

Shang dynasty diviner

Yong 泳
- Yong (泳) in oracle bone script.
- Born: c. 10th Century B.C. Shang dynasty
- Occupation: Shang dynasty diviner
- Years active: ~30 years
- Known for: Serving Di Yi and Di Xin

Chinese name
- Chinese: 永 or 泳
Transcriptions
Standard Mandarin
- Hanyu Pinyin: yǒng
- Bopomofo: ㄩㄥˇ
Middle Chinese
- Middle Chinese: hjwaengX
Old Chinese
- Baxter–Sagart (2014): /*[ɢ]ʷraŋʔ/
- Zhengzhang: /*ɢʷraŋʔ/

Yong was a prominent diviner who served Di Yi and Di Xin during the Late Shang period of the Shang dynasty. They were of the Huang (黃) group.

== Name ==
Yong shares their name with a diviner from the reign of Wu Ding. Their name is occasionally written as 永, the same character as that diviner.

== Life ==
Yong was active in Yin as a diviner, though the role oracle bone scribes play is unclear; whether they were merely writing, or the diviner making the charges recording on bones, is unclear. They served Di Yi from at least his 20th ritual cycle to Di Xin's later years, therefore spanning at least 30 years.

Oracle bones featuring Yong were almost always regarding whether or not there would be disaster for the ruler. Occasionally, they noted the year in which a divination was performed, making their activities useful for Late Shang chronology. Their handwriting, along with Huang's, is marked by tight spacing and small characters with noticeably more mature structure compared to previous oracle bone script iterations.

During a war against the Renfang, Yong travelled with Di Xin to You and performed divinations as to how it would proceed.

癸亥卜，才攸，泳貞，王旬亡禍，隹來正人方。
On the guihai day, scapulimancy was performed at You. Yong charges: Will the King (Di Xin) not receive misfortune? It is us who arrive against the Renfang.

Di Xin would spend considerable time in You with Yong. Some divinations appeared to have been performed nightly, and were all about whether or not there would be disaster.
