= Qifang (state) =

Ancient Chinese state

Qi 㠱
- Before 1102 BCE–After 770 BCE
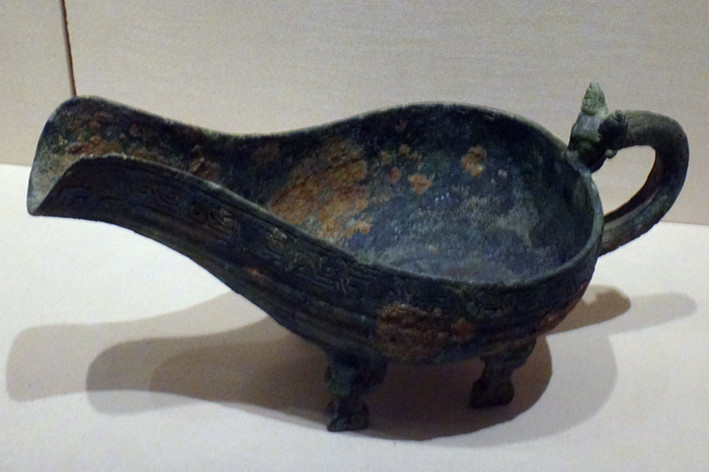
- Bronze pourer dedicated to An, Earl of Qi (㠱伯𤥃)
- Status: Fangguo
- Government: Monarchy
- Marquess (侯)
  - Before 1102 BCE: Lao, Marquess of Qi (老㠱侯)
- History
  - Established: Before 1102 BCE
  - Disestablished: After 770 BCE

- Qi/Ji (㠱) in bronze script.
- Chinese: 㠱
Transcriptions
Standard Mandarin
- Hanyu Pinyin: qí or jì
Yue: Cantonese
- Jyutping: kei^{4} or gei^{3}

Qi or Ji (Note: The character 㠱 can be pronounced Qí or Jì and sources vary as to which pronunciation is given. Qi is used in this article, in line with the 其 etymology theory.) was a fang state during Late Shang which continued as a feudal (fengjian) vassal under Western Zhou and into the Spring and Autumn period.

== History ==
The Qifang is identified with the Jiang (姜) clan based on several bronze inscriptions, and has been considered an origin of the Jiang surname seen today. The Jiang clan is traditionally identified as descending from the Flame Emperor via the state of Ji (箕), which may have divided during the late Xia dynasty (the chronology and historicity of Xia remain controversial) with various Jiang-ruled states as successors.

An oracle bone from Geng Ding or Wen Ding's reign mentions a Marquess Lao of the Qifang. Furthermore, the joining of Jia (甲) 2398 and 5877 revealed a Shang ruler preparing troops within Qifang territory.

The state continued into the Zhou dynasty after the Battle of Muye, though the character declaring its name fluctuated. One bronze gui (the shihuangui, Chinese: 师㝨簋) details King Xuan of Zhou commanding an officer (possibly the ruler of the larger Qi 齊 state) to command various vassal states, including Qi (㠱), to attack the Huaiyi over the Huai River.

Another bronze gui from late Western Zhou was provided by the Marquess of Qi as part of the dowry of a female relative named Fenmu.

The inscription on a bronze ding unearthed in 1969 in Longkou records that a Marquess of Qi gifted it to the wife of his younger brother; this vessel has been dated to the early Spring and Autumn period.

== Identification ==
Controversy exists regarding the identification of this state. An annotated edition of Shuowen Jiezi by Duan Yucai identifies Qi (㠱) as Qi (杞), an 11th to 5th century BC polity in Henan. However, this is now rejected.

Today, there are two competing theories: one identifies the state with Ji (紀), located in modern Shouguang, Shandong, while the other holds that these were two states both located in Shandong. In 690 BC, the larger state of Qi (Chinese: 齊) conquered Ji (紀). Qi (㠱), Qi (齊) and Ji (紀) all had rulers surnamed Jiang (姜).

Regardless of its identification in relation to other states, the continuation of the Qifang from Shang into Eastern Zhou is known through the state's name being written with 㠱 (such as in bronze inscription 10261) and with 己 and 丌, both together and separately, although proponents of the two-state theory in which Qi (㠱) and Ji (紀) are separate may consider inscriptions with 己 to refer to the latter only.

Li Xueqin writes that the ruler of the state mentioned in oracle bones, such as Heji 36416, could be identified with Jizi, a figure mentioned in the Chinese classics. Li also states that the character can be simplified to qi (其) given the use of the archaic form (丌) in related materials. However, the identification with Jizi is heavily disputed given Jizi's surname was likely zi (子), as well as on paleographical grounds.

== Location ==
Western Zhou-era bronzes have been unearthed that were dedicated to rulers or other nobles of the state, which have been used to inform its historical location. It is helped by the State of Yan having conflicts with the Qifang during this period, driving them away from their territory periodically, which has been used to place the Qifang in Longkou (formerly Huang County), Shandong. Others have proposed Zhucheng, Ju County, and Shouguang.

== Legacy ==
The Jiang (姜) surname corresponds with the territory of the Qifang and implies that its nobility intermarried with the Zhou dynasty. The surname was shared by rulers of other states in the area; Shandong Museum researcher Sun Jingming suggests that Qi (㠱) and Ji (紀), both located in the Mi (彌) river basin, together formed the backbone of the Jiang clan's power from Xia through to Zhou and had a close relationship with the Dongyi state of Lai.

== See also ==
- Jizi
