= You (state) =

Shang dynasty state

You 攸
- ?–After 1046 B.C.
- Map of Late Shang states.
- Status: Fangguo
- Common languages: Old Chinese
- Government: Monarchy
- Marquess (侯)
  - Before c. 1050 B.C.: Marquess You of You (攸侯由)
  - c. 1050 B.C.: Marquess Xi of You (攸侯喜)
- Historical era: Shang dynasty
  - Established: ?
  - Assistance in the Renfang campaign: c. 1050 B.C.
  - Fall of Shang at Muye: c. 1046 B.C.
  - Resistance against the Zhou and later submission: After c. 1046 B.C.
  - Disestablished: After 1046 B.C.
- Today part of: Heze City, Shandong

You
- 攸 in oracle bone script
- Chinese: 攸
Transcriptions
Standard Mandarin
- Bopomofo: ㄧㄡ
- Wade–Giles: yu^{1}
Middle Chinese
- Middle Chinese: yuw
Old Chinese
- Baxter–Sagart (2014): /*liw/
- Zhengzhang: /*lɯw/

You was a Shang ally during the Shang dynasty of ancient China. It is known for being joined by a Shang dynasty ruler, likely Di Xin, in a campaign against the Renfang prior to the Battle of Muye.

One interpretation of a phrase from Mencius would suggest that You survived into the Western Zhou dynasty during which You rebelled against the Zhou.

The State of You was likely located somewhere around modern-day Heze City, Shandong.

== History ==
=== In Oracle bones ===
The State of You had at least two rulers, Marquess You of You (攸侯由) and Marquess Xi of You (攸侯喜). At least one woman from You married into the Shang court, with the title Fu You (婦攸, "Consort from You") being seen in Hebu 《合補》2400. It either bordered or contained places called Yong (永), Pan (爿), and Yi (義).

Earlier inscriptions show a close relationship between You and Shang. Marquess You appears in Heji 《合集》32982:

戊戌貞: 右牧于爿, 攸侯由鄙.
......中牧于義, 攸侯由鄙.

Ma interprets Pan (爿) and Yi (義) as places in the frontier territory (bi 鄙) of Marquess You. The construction "Place + "Marquess" (侯) + Name" parallels the later Marquess Xi of You 攸侯喜 and Marquess Hu of Chong's (崇侯虎) name from the Chinese classics. It is also similar to a later inscription in which Yong is located within the bi of Marquess Xi, thus the interpretation.

Heji 《合集》10989 records an official named Wu (武), whom Ma Panpan identifies as a tian (田) official stationed at You.

貞: 在攸田武其來告.
Charge: In You. Will Tian Wu come to announce something?
貞: 求□其來告.
Charge: Will Qiu come to announce something?
貞: 聝任雨, 獲畀舟.
Charge: Guo orders rain, hunting in Zhou.
貞: 王占曰: 孚.
The king prognosticates, saying: It is reliable.

Tunnan 《屯南》312 records a report involving a man named Kang (亢) associated with You:

己酉卜: 攸亢告啟商.
On the jiyou day, divination: Kang of You reported concerning an incursion against Shang.

Ma tentatively interprets 攸亢 as an abbreviated reference to another tian official stationed at You, and takes the inscription as evidence that personnel based there also had a military role, given the report.

Heji《合集》9511 describes a she (舌) ritual being performed.

舌攸侯.
she-ritual performed for Marquess You. (Note: This follows Rao Zongyi's interpretation of she 舌 as some kind of ritual, as in Ma 2022.)

==== Renfang campaign ====
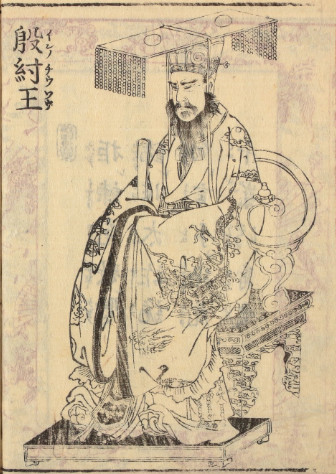
Di Xin, one of two Shang rulers who participated in the Renfang campaign.

On a jiawu day, Heji 《合集》36482 shows the Shang ruler, likely Di Xin, deciding whether to join Marquess Xi in a campaign against the Renfang, with a report being made to the Great Shang City (大邑商), coinciding with a sacrifice to Shang Jia. The prognostication was good, and so Shang joined the campaign. Heji 《合集》36483 then records the two polities proceeding together. Ma records several divinations as to whether the ruler will be safe after this period, sequencing several inscriptions located in Gu (雇), Jia (嘉), Shang, and Jiao (郊). The army then moves to the east of You to prepare the campaign. Forces eventually arrive in Yong (永), a settlement along the You state frontier (bi 鄙). Multiple divinations would be performed here by Huang and related individuals, mainly centred around whether the ruler would receive good fortune during his campaign, during several 10-day weeks.

癸卯卜, 黃貞: 王旬亡憂, 在正月.王來征尸方, 在攸侯喜鄙永.......
On the guimao day, Huang charges: During this 10-day week, will there be no misfortune? [Recorded] on the first month, the king arrives to attack the Renfang. In Marquess Xi of You's Bi Yong settlement...

Yong would perform a similar divination on a guiyou day, then continued to assist over the course of the campaign.

During the campaign Di Xin spent considerable time in You as the campaign was occurring, with nightly divinations being performed at one point.

=== In the Chinese classics ===
Evidence in the Chinese classics suggests that You was a rebel state during the Western Zhou period after the Battle of Muye, with scholarship dating back to when oracle bone script first began being studied. James Mellon Menzies made the connection between the two in 1933. Chen Mengjia would identified the You state with youyou 有攸 seen in Mencius, which can be read in two ways, depending on if you is identified as a state or an early grammatical particle:

有攸不惟臣
With You as a particle: "There are those who do not act as loyal subjects."
With You as a state: "The State of You did not submit as a loyal subject."

You (攸) was very rarely used in the Book of Documents, let alone the days of Mencius, and often seen as an archaic version of suo (所). Therefore, its use in Mencius the book is considered unusual. Following the discoveries made with oracle bones, modern interpretations of this line interpret this as referring to You rebelling against the Zhou after the Battle of Muye ended Di Xin. This can further be clarified through you (有) being interpreted as an Old Chinese prefix referring to ancient clans, which fossilized very early into toponyms by the Han dynasty.

Chen would go further and associate the State of You with the Tiao clan (條氏) seen in the Zuo Zhuan, where they are listed as an ethnicity:

殷民六族, 條氏, 徐氏, 蕭氏, 索氏, 長勺氏, 尾勺氏, 使帥其宗氏, 輯其分族, 將其類醜, 以法則周公, 用即命于周.
The six races of the Yin people: the Tiao, Xu, Xiao, Suo, Changshao, and Weishao, were commanded to lead their respective lineages, gather their branch clans, and marshal their kindred groups, so as to model themselves after the Duke of Zhou and submit to the mandate of the Zhou.

Should this be the case, the You state must have dissolved during the Western Zhou period as Zhou control was cemented.
