= Tufang (state) =

Shang dynasty state

Tufang 土方
- c. Pre-Late Shang period–c. 13th Century BCE
- Map of Late Shang states.
- Common languages: Old Chinese
- Government: Fangguo
- Earl (伯)
  - c. 1300 BCE: Earl of Tu (土伯)
- Historical era: Shang dynasty
  - Established: c. Pre-Late Shang period
  - War with Late Shang: c. 1350 BCE
  - Disestablished: c. 13th Century BCE
Succeeded by
Jin (Chinese state)
- Today part of: Shanxi

Tufang
- 土 in oracle bone script
- Chinese: 土方
Transcriptions
Standard Mandarin
- Bopomofo: ㄊㄨˇ ㄈㄤ
- Wade–Giles: t'u^{3} fang^{1}
Middle Chinese
- Middle Chinese: thuX pjang
Old Chinese
- Baxter–Sagart (2014): /*tʰˤaʔ paŋ/
- Zhengzhang: /*l̥ʰaːʔ paŋ/

The Tufang was a fangguo that existed during the Shang dynasty, known for repeatedly warring with Wu Ding prior to its eventual suppression.

== Name ==
Wars with the Tufang occurred very regularly, to the point that some oracle bone inscriptions appear to abbreviate the name as fang (方) outright. This phenomenon is seen in Heji (合集) 137, joined with 7990 and 16890, forming a narrative of a fang invading and capturing 15 and 16 people on different occasions.

== History ==
The Tufang are shown to be established enemies of the Late Shang even during the earliest known oracle bone inscriptions, which date to the 13th Century BCE during Wu Ding's reign. They are recorded as having attacked settlements and cultivated land, raided and captured Shang people, and waging all-out wars against Shang. Their history prior to the Late Shang period is unclear.

Heji (合集) 6057 records the Tufang raiding farmland owned by a community that was writing on said oracle bone, which involved 10 farmers (田人), threatening food storage and the local economy. This community was associated with the Zhifang (沚方), a Shang ally. Two cities (邑) were also destroyed. Other divinatory inscriptions, seemingly after this event, consult ancestors as to whether the Tufang will invade the Zhifang. Campaigns against Xiawei (下危) are also recorded.

Eventually, the Tufang was crushed by the Shang in a war involving Fu Zi, and a successor state, Tangtu (唐土), was made in its place, which would become Jin.

== Location ==
The Tufang appears to have been located in the Fen River basin in Shanxi, based on movements in and around Yin; however, they would also attack Yin from the east, which would not make sense with Anyang's geography if they were in Shanxi. Therefore, the overall extent of Tufang territory is unclear.

== Identification ==
=== Identification as the conquered Xia dynasty ===
Some Chinese scholars, including Guo Moruo, Hu Houxuan, and Cheng Jing, identify the Tufang as the Xia dynasty after the Battle of Mingtiao, based on a possible mention in the Classic of Poetry and Yu the Great being referred to as "Earl Yu" (伯禹) in the Book of Documents. Shen Changyun alternatively suggests a state of Qi that matches a state established in place of the Xia after they were defeated.

In Chang Fa (長發), a poem in the Classic of Poetry's section for Shang sacrificial odes transmitted by Song, the following line appears:

洪水芒芒、禹敷下土方、外大國是疆。

This is typically translated like so:

When the waters of the deluge spread vast abroad,
Yu arranged and divided the regions of the land,
And assigned to the exterior great States their boundaries,
(James Legge translation)

However, if "regions of the land" 土方 is interpreted as the Tufang state, it could be translated as Yu the Great having arranged and divided the region of the Tufang. This makes an otherwise unusual compound more understandable and adds context, but the gap between the Battle of Mingtiao and the period in which the Classic of Poetry crystalised, with little to no other mentions of the Tufang in classics, makes confirming this mention challenging. Shang dynasty origins for the poem are considered plausible, but editing, changes to lyrics, and more, over the course of around 600 years of oral tradition, make it difficult to verify whether the received text is actually mentioning the Tufang at all. Additionally, the lyric mentions a great flood myth associated with Yu; while the Shang experienced floods, no recorded floods were on the scale mentioned in the classics telling of the flood myth, which makes the lyric potentially anachronistic.

=== Xianyun tribe ===
Guo Moruo identifies the Tufang as possibly being the Xianyun that existed during the Zhou dynasty.
