= Fangguo =

Name given to ancient Chinese states

- Fang (方) in oracle bone script
- Traditional Chinese: 方國
- Simplified Chinese: 方国
Transcriptions
Standard Mandarin
- Hanyu Pinyin: fāngguó
Middle Chinese
- Middle Chinese: pjang kwok
Old Chinese
- Baxter–Sagart (2014): /*[C.q]ʷˤək paŋ/
- Zhengzhang: /*kʷɯːɡ paŋ/

Fangguo, or Fang states, were a category of ancient Chinese states during the Shang dynasty attested in oracle bone inscriptions and bronze inscriptions.

== Name ==
The term Fang is derived from the Pinyin spelling of the character 方 as spoken in Modern Standard Chinese. In Old Chinese, it is reconstructed by William H. Baxter and Laurent Sagart as /*paŋ/. In Modern Standard Chinese, 方 has many meanings, including "place", while in Classical Chinese, it has broader usage, including as a continuous aspect marker.

In oracle bone inscriptions dating to the Late Shang period, as well as bronzeware from the Zhou dynasty, fang is commonly used as a suffix for placenames (e.g. Tufang 土方). Therefore, these states are often called Fangguo in Chinese academia. Eastern Wu scholar Yu Fan identified the Guifang as an example of a nation using the term fang as a suffix in their commentary on the I Ching. The term "fangguo" as used today was first coined by Sun Yirang (孫詒讓) in his text Examples of Bronze Inscriptions (契文舉例) during the Qing dynasty.

However, fang is not always used as a placename suffix, and thus the exact meaning of fang when referring to these states is debated. For example, You is not always referred to as a fangguo. Reviews of inscriptions using the term show that allies, neutral parties, and enemies of the Shang people could receive the term. Due to the relative ambiguity in what fang precisely meant, fangguo as used in academia generally only includes states that oracle bone scribes referred to as fang. However, in a broader sense, it can refer to any one state that existed during the time in which oracle bones were actively written. Attempts have been made to define fangguo as the Shang saw them, which requires context clues from the oracular records the Shang left behind. From these clues, scholars such as Wu Shuhui and David Keightley believe the term may be used as a broad reference to polities outside of the Shang people's influence, or more specifically, those outside of the Great Shang City (大邑商), known today as Yin.

== Overview ==
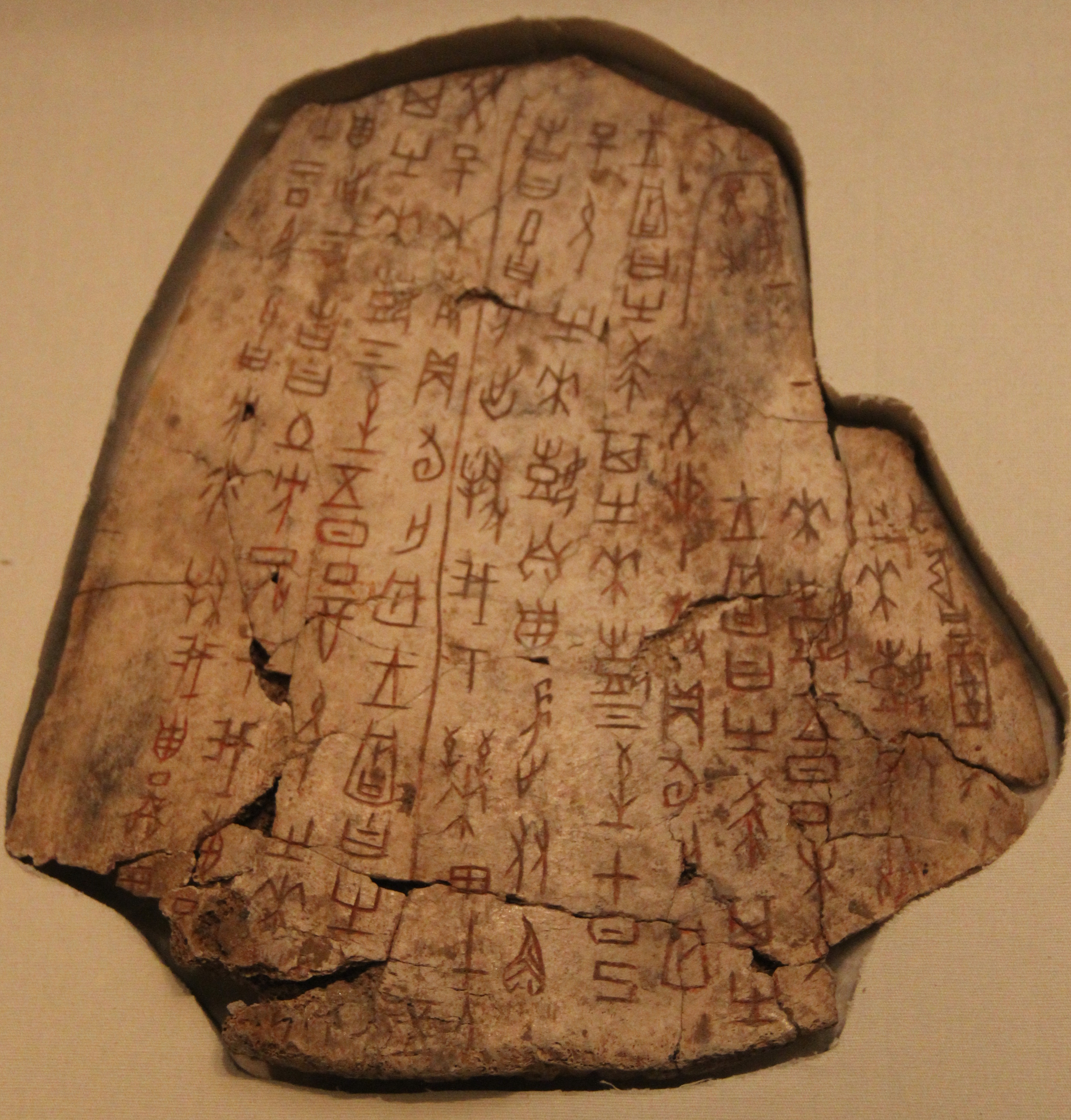
Oracle bone inscription on Ox scapula by Nan about disasters during a war with the Gongfang (𢀛方).

Due to a vanishing lack of written records from individual fangguo, details of how they operated, functioned, and lived, is largely made apparent by oracle bones that detail dealings between the Late Shang or Western Zhou royal courts and the fangguo in question. Given these states may have been illiterate, it is difficult to find autonyms for them, or their own perspectives. For example, the Tufang is only known as the Tufang from Shang sources; there are seemingly no written sources or artifacts made by people from the Tufang, and thus no way of connecting a potential autonym for their state. Likewise, it is difficult to find potential locations for them outside of vague descriptions given by oracle bones found in places like Yin, the Shang capital, within which the Shang people can say whether they were north, south, east, or west of the settlement. Wartime movements can improve accuracy, where they will often describe where they are being attacked from or going to different states to mount assaults. These issues nevertheless make it difficult to identify a physical culture, potential language, or perspectives for any individual fangguo, though bronzeware and their distribution shows they were heavily influenced by Shang culture at some point.

Fangguo appear to have been distinct to modern conceptions of a tribal confederation, city-state, or nation-state. They contained settlements known as yi (邑) to the Shang. Their development appears to have been unequal, without a clear set of socioeconomic principles. They appear to have been primarily agrarian societies. The Shang would earn alliances through the king marrying women from these polities, military power, and cultural influence through the state religion. Leaders or otherwise notable people in fangguo could receive feudal titles such as hou (侯) and bo (伯), commonly translated as Marquis and Earl, respectively. For example, the classical figure Marquess Hu of Chong is identified as a Marquess through the structure State + hou + Name. These figures would commonly arrive and participate in religious ceremonies with Shang nobility. Military alliances could also form, with Shang rulers ordering fangguo to attack their enemies, The Predynastic Zhou are identified as a fangguo by the Shang, which held military alliances with the ruling Shang for a considerable length of time, defending them from the rear whilst warring in the east. These military alliances were reciprocal, and the Shang did accompany fangguo in their own wars, such as in the case of Di Xin accompanying You to attack the Renfang, a move that would ultimately lead to a surprise loss during the Battle of Muye at the hands of a rebelling Predynastic Zhou, resulting in the end of the Shang dynasty proper.

=== Textual evidence ===
Xiaochen Yu Xi zun vessel, Di Xin's reign

Fangguo are sporadically mentioned in the Chinese classics, such as Bamboo Annals, including in relation to the semi-legendary Xia dynasty. For example, during the reign of He Dan Jia, the Earl of Da Peng and the Earl of Wei (韋) invaded a place called Banfang (班方):

五年，侁人入于班方。彭伯、韋伯伐班方，侁人來賓。
In the fifth year, the Shen people entered Banfang. The Earl of Peng and Earl of Wei attacked Banfang, and the Shen people came as guests.

Excavated texts, particularly oracle bones and bronzeware, are chief sources of fangguo information, written in ancient forms of the Han script. Chiefly uncovered in the past century, fangguo are mentioned far more prominently, and found to have experienced a variety of relations with the Shang: For example, the Zhifang (沚方) assisted Wu Ding in his campaign against the attacking Tufang. On the flip side, the Tufang are seeing raiding farms and kidnapping Shang people.

As bronze inscriptions grew more complex during the reigns of the last two Shang Kings, Di Yi and Di Xin, they also began to talk about campaigns against the fangguo. Particularly prominent among the fangguo found in bronze inscriptions are the Renfang (人方). Records of campaigns against the Renfang can be found on two of the most famous late Shang bronze inscriptions: the Xiaozi X (Note: The X here is due to an illegible character) You 小子X卣 (JC: 5417) and the Xiaochen Yu Xi Zun 小臣艅犀尊 (JC: 5990). At the end of the Xiaozi X You the caster of the vessel Xiaozi X gets ordered by a prince that he shall "watch" (wang 望) over the Renfang. The Xiaochen Yu Xi Zun on the other hand records a visit of Di Xin, the last Shang ruler, to a place called Kuijing (夔京), during his 15th sacrificial year. Di Xin awarded the Xiaochen (小臣, "little minister") Yu cowrie shells from Kuijing, which served as currency at the time. Di Xin seemed to have used Kuijing as a post from which he launched a punitive expedition against the Renfang.

== Identifying a Fangguo ==
Map of the Shang dynasty with archaeological sites marked in black and red.

While inscriptions detailing fangguo are often formulaic, the syntax of Old Chinese is ambiguous, and the word fang has multiple uses. Therefore, confirming whether a fangguo is being discussed requires further context for confirmation.

Sun Yabing and Lin Huan give the following criteria in their 2010 book Geography and States in Shang Dynasty:

1. It is called X方 in oracle bone inscriptions.
2. Someone is called X侯 "marquess of X" or X伯 "earl of X" in oracle bones or bronze inscriptions.
3. Someone is called X子 "prince of X" in oracle bone inscriptions (this is rare).
4. It fought a large-scale war with the Shang royal house (e.g. verbs for invasion, such as fa 伐, are used).
5. Someone is called X王 "king of X" in oracle bone inscriptions.
6. Archaeological materials prove it was a Fang polity.
7. It is mentioned by transmitted texts and corroborated by oracle bones, bronze inscriptions or other archaeological materials.
8. It is one of the "nine states" (九邦) mentioned in the Shanghai Museum bamboo-slip text Rong Cheng Shi.

Sun and Lin list 154 fangguo meeting at least one of their criteria.

== Decline of Fangguo ==
Fangguo seemingly declined during the Late Shang period, specifically around the time of the Erligang culture, which is thought to have been a result of eastern military expansion against tribes of from the Dongyi region in modern-day Shandong. Wu Shuhui argues that this eastward expansion was to gain further access to copper. Post-conquest, cultural assimilation appears to have taken place, which was inherited by the Zhou dynasty after overthrew Di Xin at the Battle of Muye. States such as Qi and You were active well into the Zhou dynasty, with Qi having bronzes dating at least to the reign of King Xuan of Zhou.

There is little mention of fangguo post-Zhou dynasty, with the concept of fangguo seemingly being forgotten and fossilized in toponyms like the Guifang. The Qin dynasty, which united China for the first time, marked a period of intense centralisation, which almost assuredly eliminated any remaining fangguo.
