= King Xuanhui of Han =

King Xuanhui of Han 韓宣惠王

King of Han
- Reign: 323–312 BC
- Predecessor: Himself (As marquess)
- Successor: King Xiang of Han

Marquess of Han
- Reign: 332–323 BC
- Predecessor: Marquess Xi of Han (韓釐侯)
- Successor: Himself (Elevated to king)
- Born: 400 BC
- Died: 319 BC
Names
- Ancestral name: Jī (姬); Lineage name: Hán (韓); Given name: Unknown
Posthumous name
- Marquess Wei (威侯) or King Xuanhui (宣惠王)
- House: Ji
- Dynasty: Han
- Father: Marquess Xi of Han

King Xuanhui of Han (Chinese: 韓宣惠王; died 312 BC), also known as Marquess Wei of Han (Chinese: 韓威侯), personal name unknown, was a ruler of the Han state. He ruled initially as marquess, and then as king since 323 BC.

In 325 BC, he met with King Hui of Wei, who honoured him as "king". However, Marquess Wei would only formally declare himself king in 323 BC, along with the rulers of four other states: Zhongshan, Wei, Yan, and Zhao.

== Ancestors ==
Ancestors of King Xuanhui of Han

16. Marquess Wen of Han
8. Marquess Ai of Han
4. Marquess Gong of Han
2. Marquess Xi of Han
1. King Xuanhui of Han

Chinese royalty
Preceded by Marquess Xi of Han	Marquess of Han; 332 BC – 312 BC	Succeeded by King Xiang of Han
