= Wuzi of Han =

Wuzi of Han may refer to:

- Wuzi of Han (Spring and Autumn), the progenitor of the House of Han, and later State of Han
- Wuzi of Han (Warring States), a descendant of the above and also ruler of the State of Han
