= King Huanhui of Han =

King Huanhui of Han 韓桓惠王

King of Han
- Reign: 272–239 BC
- Predecessor: King Xi
- Successor: Han An
- Died: 239 BC
Names
- Ancestral name: Jī (姬); Lineage name: Hán (韓); Given name: Unknown
Posthumous name
- King Huanhui (桓惠王) or King Huan (桓王) or King Hui (惠王) or King Daohui (悼惠王)
- House: Ji
- Dynasty: Han
- Father: King Xi

King Huanhui of Han (Chinese: 韓桓惠王; pinyin: Hán Huánhuì Wáng; died 239 BC), personal name unknown, was a monarch of the Han state. He was the son of King Xi, whom he succeeded in 272 BC. During King Huanhui's reign, Han Fei submitted numerous proposals to enact Legalism. In 246 BC, King Huanhui sent Zheng Guo west to the Qin state to construct a canal with the intention of wasting Qin's resources. The canal came to be known as the Zheng Guo Canal.

In 262 BC, Qin sent Bai Qi to invade Han and took Yewang. To broker peace, King Huanhui ceded Shangdang Commandery to Qin. The people of Shangdang refused to be ruled by Qin but also lacked the military strength for defense. Shangdang's governor-general Feng Ting (馮亭) surrendered instead to the Zhao state. Zhao accepted the surrender and sent Lian Po to defend Changping; the Battle of Changping ensued.

King Huanhui died in 239 BC and was succeeded by his son, Han An.

Chinese royalty
| Preceded by King Xi of Han | King of Han; 272 BC – 239 BC | Succeeded by King An of Han |
