= King Xiang of Han =

King Xiang of Han 韓襄王

King of Han
- Reign: 311–296 BC
- Predecessor: King Xuanhui
- Successor: King Xi
- Died: 296 BC
- Issue: Han Ying; King Xi; Han Jishi
Names
- Ancestral name: Jī (姬); Lineage name: Hán (韓); Given name: Cāng (倉)
Posthumous name
- King Xiang (襄王) or King Xiang'ai (襄哀王) or King Daoxiang (悼襄王)
- House: Ji
- Dynasty: Han
- Father: King Xuanhui of Han

King Xiang of Han (Chinese: 韩襄王), personal name Han Cang (韓倉), was king of the Han state from 311 BC until his death in 296 BC. He was the son of King Xuanhui.

In 308 BC, King Xiang met with King Wu of Qin in Linjin (臨晉). That autumn, Qin minister Gan Mao (甘茂) invaded Yiyang and captured it in the following year, executing 60,000 soldiers. In 302 BC, King Xiang sent Crown Prince Ying (太子嬰) to Qin as a hostage.

In 301 BC, Qin invaded Han and took Rang (穰). Qin then formed an alliance with Han, Wei, and Qi to attack Chu. Han forces were led by Bao Yuan (暴鳶). The alliance defeated Chu in the Battle of Chuisha and killed the Chu general Tang Mie.

In 300 BC, Crown Prince Ying died. Prince Jiu and Prince Jishi (蟣蝨) fought over the succession, but Prince Jishi ended up as a hostage in Chu. Chu then attacked Han and sieged Yongzhi (雍氏), in modern-day northeast Yuzhou, for five months. King Xiang sent multiple envoys to request aid from Qin, and finally Zhang Cui (張翠) was able to succeed. Qin sent Gan Mao and lifted the siege.

King Xiang died in 296 BC and was succeeded by his son, King Xi.

Chinese royalty
Preceded by King Xuanhui of Han	King of Han; 311 BC – 296 BC	Succeeded by King Xi of Han
