= Yugong =

Yugong may refer to:

- Yu Gong, or Tribute of Yu, in the Book of Documents
- Yugong, the protagonist in The Foolish Old Man Removes the Mountains
