= Han Jian =

Han Jian may refer to:

- Han Jian (Zhou Dynasty), third head of the House of Han
- Han Jian (Weibo warlord) (died 883), Tang dynasty warlord who governed Weibo Circuit
- Han Jian (Zhenguo warlord) (855–912), Tang dynasty warlord who governed Zhenguo Circuit, also served Later Liang after the end of Tang
- Han Jian (badminton) (born 1956), Chinese badminton player
- Hanjian, in Chinese culture a highly derogatory and pejorative term for a traitor

== See also ==
- Han Ji-an
