= Ai of Han =

Ai of Han may refer to:

- Marquess Ai of Han (died 374 BC)
- Emperor Ai of Han (27–1 BC)
