= Han Yu (disambiguation) =

Han Yu was a Chinese writer and official of the Tang dynasty.

Han Yu may also refer to:

- Han Yu (pool player)
- Han Yu (curler)
- Ziyu of Han, the head of the House of Han during the Spring and Autumn period
