= Changes in the course of the Yellow River =

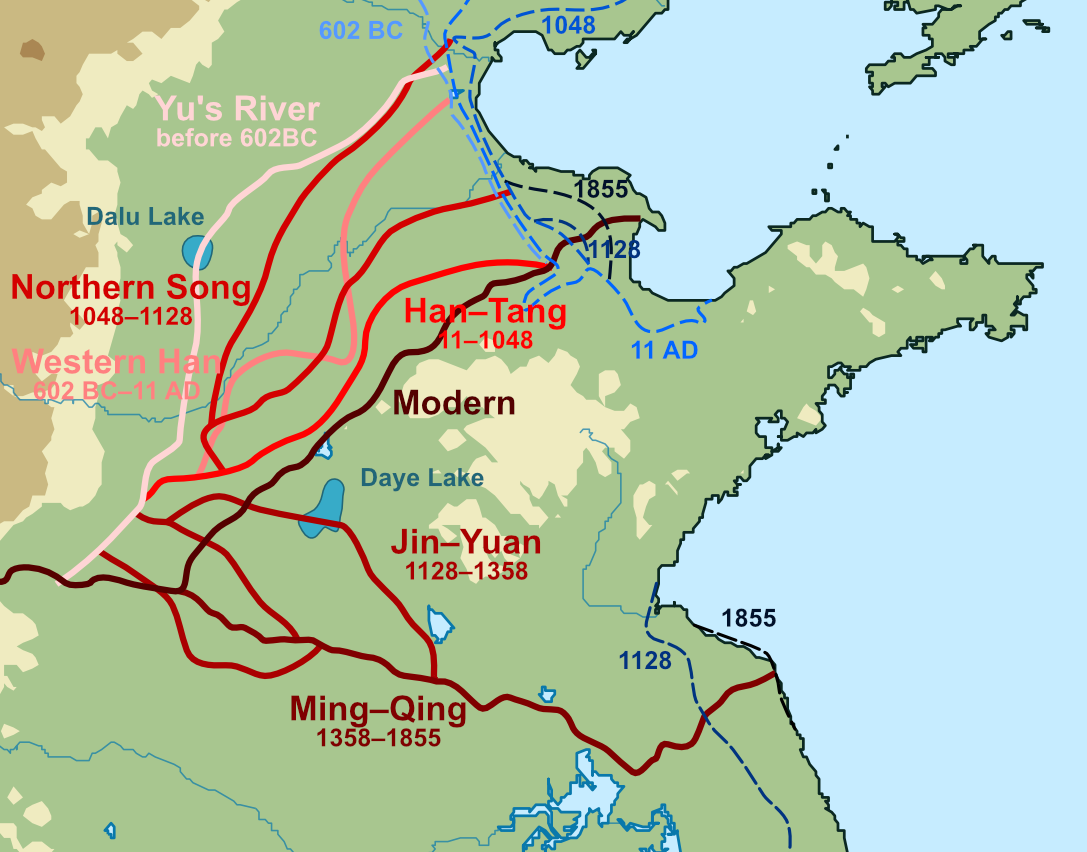
Historical course changes of the Yellow River Modern Yellow River Ming–Qing course (1368–1855) Jin-Yuan course(1128–1368) Northern Song course（1048–1128） Eastern Han course (11–1048) Western Han course (602 BCE – 11 AD） Course of Yu the Great（before 602 BC） 1855 coastline 1128 coastline 1048 coastline 11 AD coastline 602 BC coastline Ancient lakes

Dynamic map of the Yellow River's various course changes

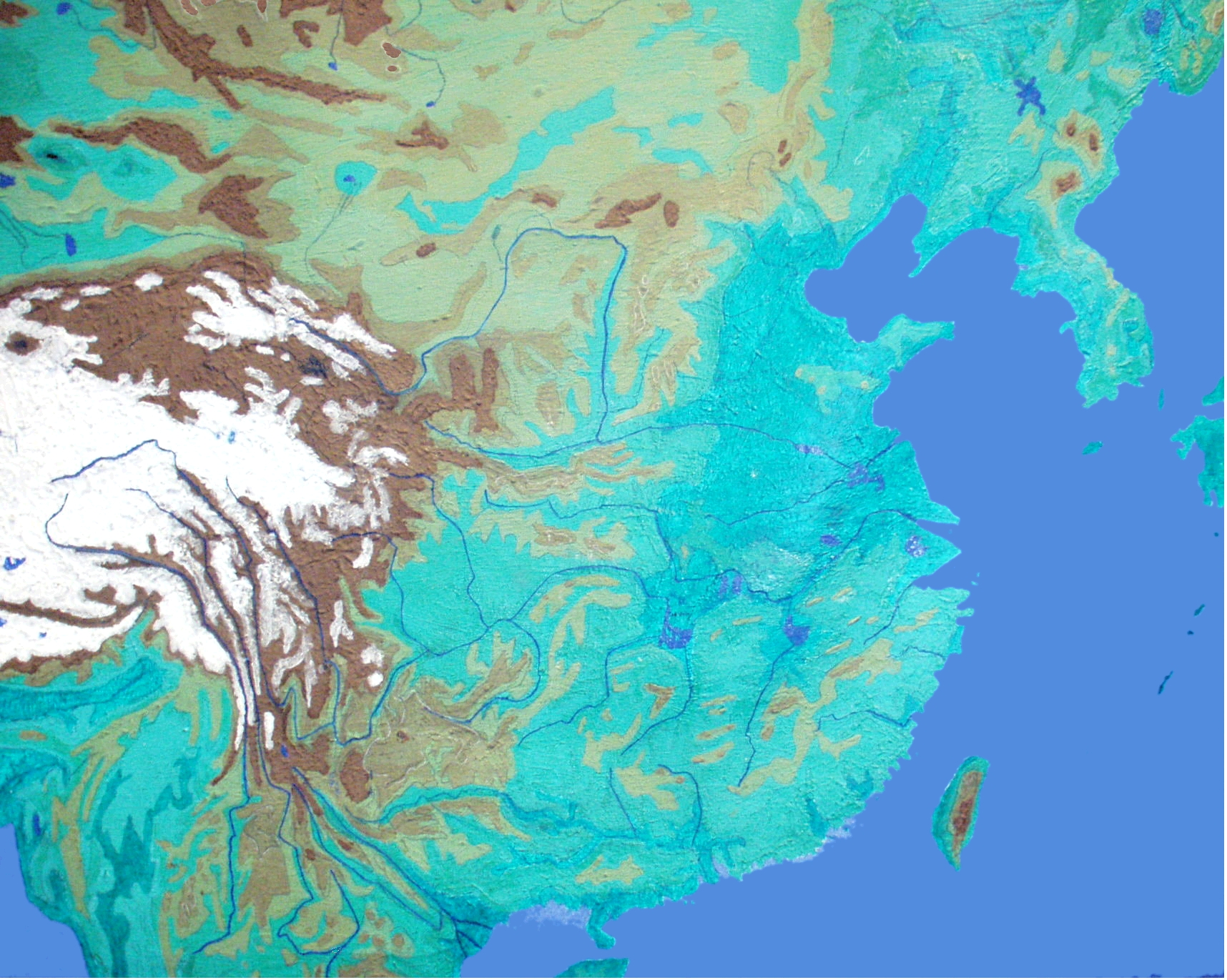
The Yellow River flowing into the sea via the Huai River system

The Yellow River is known for its heavy sediment, frequent levee breaches, and frequent changes in course. Many river channel migrations over history inspired the saying, "it breaches its banks twice in three years and changes course once in a century." At its northernmost extent, the river once flowed into the Hai River and entered the sea at Dagu Forts. At its southernmost extent, it flowed through the Huai River system and ultimately joined the Yangtze River. Historical records indicate that between 602 BCE and 1946, the Yellow River breached its banks and flooded 1,593 times and underwent 26 major course changes. These course shifts, especially the six major migrations that impacted present-day Henan, Hebei, Shandong, Anhui, and Jiangsu, dramatically altered settlement patterns, agriculture, and local livelihoods in these regions. Except for a small number of human-induced events, most course changes occurred due to natural levee breaches. In particular, this was evident after the Tang dynasty.

== Pre-Qin period ==
=== Great Flood of Gun-Yu ===
During the era of the Three Sovereigns and Five Emperors (around the early 21st century BCE), the Yellow River experienced severe flooding, and Yu the Great was tasked with controlling the waters. According to the chapter "Yugong" in the "Book of Documents", the early course of the Yangtze River is described as follows:

He traced the He from Ji-shi as far as Long-men; and thence, southwards, to the north of (mount) Hua; eastward then to Di-zhu; eastward (again) to the ford of Meng; eastward (still) to the junction of the Luo; and then on to Da-pi. (From this the course was) northwards, past the Jiang-water, on to Da-lu; north from which the river was divided, and became the nine He, which united again, and formed the Meeting He, when they entered the sea.

— English translation: James Legge, Tribute of Yu

In this account, "Jishi" is generally identified with the Amne Machin Mountains near present-day Xunhua Salar Autonomous County in Qinghai. The text suggests that the river flowed southward below Longmen to Huayin, then turned eastward, passing Mengjin, where it joined the Luo River. After passing Mount Dapi, the river flowed northward, crossed the Zhang River, and continued north to the east of present-day Quzhou County in Hebei, where it divided into several branches that entered the sea along different channels. The northernmost branch served as the main course, turning east near present-day Shenzhou, following the Zhang River to the southwest of Qing County, and then flowing northeast past the southeast of Tianjin before emptying into the Bohai Sea. Because this course is recorded in the Yu Gong, it is traditionally referred to as the “Yu River”.

=== Major diversion of the Yu River ===
In 602 BCE, during the fifth year of King Ding of zhou's reign, the Yellow River breached its banks at Suxu Kou in Liyang, southwest of present-day Xun County in Henan. It diverted from its former course along the Yu River and entered the sea near Zhangwu, northeast of present-day Cang County in Hebei. This event marks the first major diversion of the Yellow River since Yu the Great’s legendary flood-control works.

After the Suxu Kou breach, the river flowed east from near present-day Hua County, then turned northwest of Puyang in Henan. It bent east, north of Guan County in Shandong, then north again, north of Chiping, and passed through Dezhou. Gradually, it shifted further north through Cangzhou in Hebei, eventually emptying into the Bohai Sea north of present-day Huanghua. The former course of the Yu River occasionally still carried water, but it was not completely abandoned until the middle of the Warring States period.

== Qin and Han periods ==
In 168 BCE, during the twelfth year of Emperor Wen of Han's reign, the Yellow River breached its dikes at Suanzao in present-day Yanjin County. This was the earliest recorded breach of the Yellow River during the Han dynasty.

=== Diversion in Wei Commandery ===
In 11 CE, during the third year of the Jian'guo era of the Xin dynasty, the Yellow River breached its banks in Wei Commandery and flowed through Pingyuan and Jinan before entering the sea near Qiancheng. This marked the second major recorded diversion of the Yellow River in history. By 70 CE, Wang Jing (Eastern Han Dynasty), who was in charge of river management, carefully selected a new river course and carried out comprehensive regulation works, finally bringing the flooding under control. This river course diverged from the former Western Han channel near present-day Puyang, Henan, passed through present-day Liaocheng and Yucheng in Shandong, and entered the sea near present-day Lijin County. This course remained in use for several hundred years without any major breaches or diversions.

=== Northern Song period ===
==== Henglong diversion ====
In the Northern Song, during the first year of the Jingyou era(1034-1038), the Yellow River breached the Henglong levee in Chanzhou, present-day Puyang, Henan. North of the old river course used during the Han and Tang dynasties, the river split into several branches, including the Chi, Jin, and You rivers, all of which flowed northeast into the sea. This new course became known as the Henglong River. In 1041, during the first year of the Qingli era, the emperor issued an edict suspending efforts to close the breached channel. From that point onward, the main river below Puyang abandoned the course it had followed for more than a thousand years, a route later referred to as the Jingdong course, and it was never fully restored. The Henglong River remained active for fourteen years. Although it did not cause major disasters, sedimentation accumulated rapidly.

=== Shanghu diversion ===
In the Northern Song, during the eighth year of the Qingli era(1041-1048) under Emperor Renzong of Song, the Yellow River breached the Shanghu levee in Chanzhou, near present-day Changhuji in Puyang. After the flooding, the river divided into two main channels. One branch flowed northward toward Daming, passed west of Liaocheng, joined the Wei River near present-day Qing County, Hebei, and entered the sea near Tianjin. This branch became known as the “Northern Flow”. The other branch flowed eastward and entered the sea near present-day Wudi County, Shandong, becoming known as the “Eastern Flow”. The Eastern Flow continued until 1099, during the second year of the Yuanfu era under Emperor zhezong of Song, when it finally dried up.

=== Three artificial diversions of the Yellow River ===
The term “Three Yellow River diversions” is sometimes used to refer to three major flood-control interventions during the reigns of Emperor Renzong, Emperor Shenzong, and Emperor Zhezong of the Song dynasty.

- First diversion: In 1056, during the first year of the Jiayou era, officials forcibly blocked the Northern Flow at Shanghu and redirected the Yellow River into the Liuta River. However, the Liuta River could not contain the massive volume of water, and the levees burst that very night. Contemporary accounts described drowned soldiers and laborers, with floating corpses and debris “too numerous to count”. The court later dispatched Shen Li to inspect the disaster site, while officials responsible for the river works were demoted.
- Second diversion: During the Xining era, the Northern Flow was blocked again, and the Office for Dredging the Yellow River was established. These measures triggered repeated breaches along the river. At one point, the river even diverted into the Huai River system and entered the sea through it, flooding forty-five prefectures and counties. The regions of Pu, Qi, Yun, and Xu suffered especially severe damage, and more than 300,000 qing of farmland were destroyed.
- Third diversion: In 1093, during the eighth year of the Yuanyou era, the Northern Flow was once again sealed off. In 1099, during the second year of the Yuanfu era, flooding caused a breach at Sanmenxia. Both the “Shengde Inscription”, constructed during the Kaiyuan era of the Tang dynasty, and the rebuilt “Temple of Yu” from the Dali era were destroyed by the floodwaters. Later that year, another levee breach occurred at Neihuangkou, and the Eastern Flow was finally cut off.

== Southern Song diversion ==
After the establishment of the Southern Song dynasty, in 1128, the second year of the Jianyan era(1127-1129), the Kaifeng defender Du Chong deliberately breached the Yellow River dikes at Huazhou (present-day Hua County, Henan) in an attempt to halt the southward advance of the Jin army. This action triggered a major diversion of the Yellow River's course.

The new course flowed south of Hua County, between present-day Puyang and Dongming County, then passed through Juancheng, Juye, Jiaxiang, and Jinxiang in Shandong, before joining the Si River and eventually entering the Huai River system. From there, the river flowed into the sea, marking the beginning of the Yellow River’s southward shift from the Bohai Sea to the Yellow Sea. After this diversion, the main course of the Yellow River frequently shifted across the southern plains between Zhengzhou and Qingkou. At various times, the river entered the Huai system through the Si River, the Bian River, the Guo River, or the Ying River, and occasionally through several channels simultaneously before flowing into the Yellow Sea. Although northward overflows sometimes occurred, they were repeatedly blocked by human intervention to maintain the southern course.

In 1168, during the eighth year of the Dading era under Emperor Shizong of Jin, the Yellow River breached its banks at Ligu Ford in present-day Hua County. Part of the floodwaters flowed toward Shanzhou, and contemporary accounts described the river as being divided, with "six parts flowing through the new channel and four parts through the old channel". In 1194, during the fifth year of the Mingchang era under Emperor zhangzong of Jin, the Yellow River again breached its dikes at Yangwu and flooded eastward toward Fengqiu.

In 1234, during the third year of the Tianxing era under Emperor Aizong of Jin, Mongol forces reached the vicinity of Luoyang and set up encampments while attacking Guide Prefecture (Chinese: 归德府), a prefecture of the Jin dynasty located in present-day Shangqiu, Henan. According to the Xu Zizhi Tongjian, the Mongols diverted water from the Yellow River at Cunjin Di (Chinese: 寸金淀), a lake area north of present-day Kaifeng, in order to flood the Song forces. The resulting inundation caused heavy casualties among the Southern Song troops, who were forced to retreat southward. The Yellow River subsequently shifted its course, breaking into the Guo River and entering the Huai River system, leading to another significant alteration in its lower reaches.

== Yuan dynasty ==
In 1286, during the twenty-third year of the zhiyuan era under Emperor Shizu of Yuan, the Yellow River breached its banks at fifteen locations, including Kaifeng, Xiangfu, Chenliu, Qi, Taikang, Tongxu, Yanling, Fugou, Weichuan, Weishi, Yangwu, Yanjin, Zhongmu County, Yuanwu, and Suizhou. The Yuan court mobilized 204,323 laborers from Nanjing, present-day Kaifeng, to repair the dikes and reinforce the riverbanks.

In 1297, during the first year of the Dade era under Emperor Chengzong of Yuan, the Yellow River breached its dikes at Pukou in Qi County. In 1298, it breached again, and the resulting floods inundated Bianliang and Guide. In 1344, during the fourth year of the Zhizheng era under Toghon Temür, severe flooding caused the Yellow River to breach its banks at Baimaokou in present-day Cao County, Shandong. The main current turned northeast into the Grand Canal system before flowing south into the Huai River system, and the flooding continued for seven years. The Yuan court later appointed Jia Lu as Minister of Works and chief director of river conservancy to oversee flood-control operations and seal the breaches. After the repairs, the section of the river from Caozhou to Xuzhou became known as the Jia Lu River.

== Ming dynasty ==
During the early Ming dynasty, the Yellow River flowed through Xingze, Yuanwu, Kaifeng, and Suqian before entering the Huai River system to the south. Between 1384 and 1397, during the reign of the Hongwu Emperor, the river breached its banks multiple times within Henan. In 1391, during the twenty-fourth year of the Hongwu era, the Yellow River breached its banks at Heiyangshan in Yuanwu. The floodwaters passed eastward north of Kaifeng, then flowed southeast through Chenzhou, Xiangcheng, Taihe, and Yanshang before fully entering the Huai River at Zhengyang in Shouzhou. As a result, the former river channel previously regulated by Jia Lu between Caozhou and Shanzhou gradually silted up, while the main current shifted through the area between present-day Xihua and Huaiyang, entering the Ying River before ultimately flowing into the Huai system.

== Qing dynasty ==
On 1 August 1855, corresponding to the nineteenth day of the sixth month in the fifth year of the Xianfeng era under the Qing dynasty, the Yellow River breached its northern bank at Tongwaxiang in present-day Lankao, Henan, causing a major diversion of the river’s course. The floodwaters initially flowed northwest before turning northeast. In Shandong, the river entered the Bohai Sea by following the former course of the Ji River, also known as the Daqing River. This event marked the end of the Yellow River’s long period of flowing south into the Yellow Sea through the Huai River system. Before the 1855 diversion, the lower reaches of the Yellow River had generally flowed through present-day Xingyang, Zhengzhou, Yuanyang, Yanjin County, Fengqiu County, Zhongmu County, Kaifeng, and Lankao in Henan, then through Cao County and Shan County in Shandong, before passing through Dangshan County and Xiao County in Anhui, and finally through Feng County, Pei County, Xuzhou, Pizhou, Suining County, Suqian, Siyang County, Huai'an, Lianshui County, Funing County, and Binhai County in Jiangsu before emptying into the Yellow Sea.

== Republic of China period ==
On the night of 6 June 1938, during the Second Sino-Japanese War, units of the National Revolutionary Army of the Republic of China began breaching the dikes of the Yellow River at Huayuankou on the southern bank near Zhengzhou in an attempt to halt the advance of the Imperial Japanese Army. On 9 June, explosives were used to destroy the dikes completely. After the breach, the river once again shifted southward. One branch flowed along the Jialu River and the Ying River toward Fuyang, Anhui, before entering the Huai River at Zhengyangguan. Another branch flowed from Zhongmu County along the Guo River and entered the Huai system near Huaiyuan. The flooding continued for eight years and affected forty-four counties and cities across Henan, Anhui, and Jiangsu. The Yellow River did not return to its northern course until the Huayuankou breach was sealed in 1947.

== See also ==
- Old Course of the Yellow River
- Yellow River capture of the Huai River
- Yellow River management
