= Yellow River management =

Flood prevention project in China

Yellow River management, Yellow River governance or Yellow River engineering (simplified Chinese: 黄河治理; traditional Chinese: 黃河治理) involves constructing hydraulic engineering projects to prevent flood disasters caused by the Yellow River and to harness its water resources. The river, flowing through the Loess Plateau, has been notorious since ancient times for its high sediment content and its propensity to flood and change course. Simple construction of riverbanks to prevent flooding would lead to sediment accumulation, creating an elevated river in downstream areas.

The management of the Yellow River is a comprehensive issue involving politics, economics, culture, and political theology, and it has also been a longstanding challenge for Chinese rulers throughout history. The flooding of the Yellow River often signifies large-scale displacement and dynastic changes. The saying "a sage emerges when the Yellow River is clear" (聖人出黃河清) illustrates that effective management of the Yellow River is closely linked to the legitimacy, effectiveness, and stability of Chinese regimes.

== History ==
Legend has it that the Xia dynasty was founded by Yu the Great, who organized efforts to control water. The origin of the Chinese nation is closely tied to the management of the Yellow River.

After Qin Shi Huang unified the Six States, he initiated large-scale hydraulic constructions, including dredging of the river channels. During the reign of Emperor Wu of Han of Han, the renowned water management expert Zheng Guo expanded the scale of the projects, constructing the Zhengguo Canal, and systematized the management of the Yellow River even further.

During the Sui dynasty and Tang dynasty periods, the focus of Yellow River management was on strengthening the levees and dredging the river channels.

In the Ming Dynasty, Pan Jixun employed the method of "binding water to expel sand" and integrated management of the Yellow and Huai Rivers.

After the 1950s, the People's Republic of China started tree planting on the Loess Plateau to stabilize the sand and built reservoirs such as the Xiaolangdi Dam. By using annual concentrated flood discharge and sediment transport management, they aimed to deepen the downstream riverbed of the Yellow River for long-term management.
