= Marquess Lie =

Marquess Lie may refer to:

- Marquess Lie of Zhao (died 400 BC)
- Marquess Lie of Han (died 387 BC)
