= Wen of Han =

Wen of Han may refer to:

- Marquess Wen of Han (died 377 BC)
- Emperor Wen of Han (203–157 BC)
