= An, King of Han =

Ruler of Chinese State of Han from 238 to 230 BC

Han An 韓安

King of Han
- Reign: 238–230 BC
- Predecessor: King Huanhui
- Successor: None (Dynasty collapsed)
- Died: 226 BC
Names
- Ancestral name: Jī (姬); Lineage name: Hán (韓); Given name: Ān (安)
- House: Ji
- Dynasty: Han
- Father: King Huanhui

Han An, commonly known as "An, King of Han" (Chinese: 韓王安; pinyin: Hán Wáng Ān; died 226 BCE), was the final ruler of the Han state, ruling from 238 BC to 230 BC. He was the son of King Huanhui, whom he succeeded to the Han throne.

In 233 BC, Han An sent Han Fei to the Qin state to request to be a vassal. However, Han Fei was executed. In 231 BC, Han An offered Nanyang (南陽), an area around modern-day Mount Wangwu, to Qin. In the 9th month of the same year, Qin sent Metropolitan Superintendent (内史) Teng (騰) to receive the area.

In 230 BC, Qin sent Teng to attack the Han state. Han An was captured and the Han state ceased to exist. Qin then created Yingchuan Commandery from the conquered Han territory.

In 226 BC, ex-Han nobility launched a failed rebellion, and Han An died the same year.

Chinese royalty
Preceded by King Huanhui of Han	King of Han; 238 BC – 230 BC	Succeeded by Kingdom destroyed
