= Three Old Articles (China) =

Papers by Mao Zedong

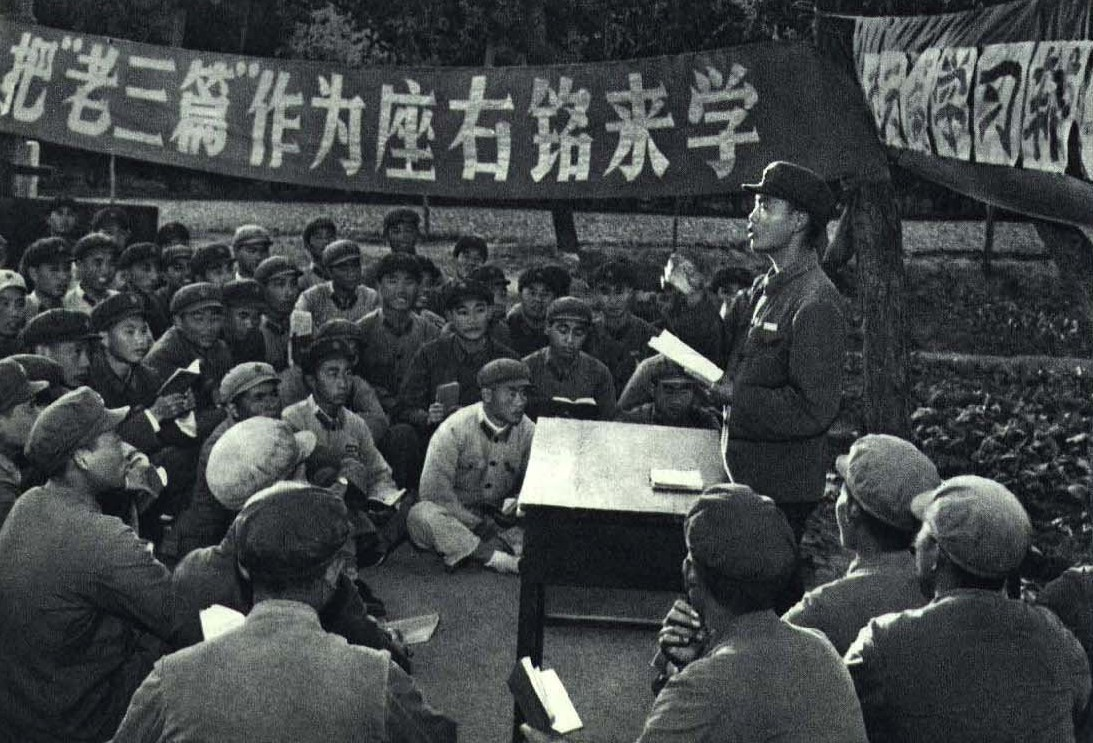
PLA soldiers learning about the Three Old Articles in 1967

The Three Old Articles (老三篇), also the Three Constantly Read Articles, are the three papers entitled "Serve the People", "In Memory of Norman Bethune" and "The Foolish Old Man Who Removed the Mountains" published by Mao Zedong before the 1949 proclamation of the People's Republic of China. These three articles mainly elaborated on the Chinese Communist Party's concepts of "serving the people", "not benefiting oneself but exclusively benefiting others" and "hard struggle".

Lin Biao was instrumental in establishing the canon of these three articles.

== Serve the People ==
Serve the People is a speech written by Mao Zedong to commemorate the death of a People's Liberation Army (PLA) soldier, Zhang Side, a participant in the Long March who died in the collapse of a kiln when he worked in Shaanxi province. In the speech, Mao quoted a phrase written by the famous Han dynasty historian Sima Qian: "Though death befalls all men alike, it may be heavy as Mount Tai or light as a feather". Mao continued: "To die for the people is weightier than Mount Tai, but to work for the fascists and die for the exploiters and oppressors is lighter than a feather. Comrade Zhang Side died for the people, and his death is indeed weightier than Mount Tai".

The speech, delivered on 8 September 1944, states that the CCP and the PLA have no other goal than to serve the people. It states that the CCP and its cadres should not be afraid of criticism, and if criticism is correct, they should accept it and revise their behavior accordingly. It also states that everyone in the revolutionary ranks is equal regardless of title or position.

== In Memory of Norman Bethune ==
"In Memory of Norman Bethune" (纪念白求恩) is a eulogy dedicated to Henry Norman Bethune, a Canadian thoracic surgeon and member of the Communist Party of Canada. He came to China to support the CCP's Eighth Route Army during the Second Sino-Japanese War. Bethune helped bring modern medicine to rural China, treating both sick villagers and wounded soldiers. He later died of blood poisoning after accidentally cutting his finger while operating on wounded Chinese soldiers.

Bethune's service to the CCP earned him the respect of Mao Zedong, who wrote the eulogy when Bethune died in 1939, highly praising his spirit of communism and internationalism. His name is honored in China to this day.

== The Foolish Old Man Who Removed the Mountains ==
=== Story ===
The myth The Foolish Old Man Removes the Mountains (愚公移山) concerns a Foolish Old Man of 90 years who lived near the Taihang and the Wangwu mountains. He was annoyed by the obstruction caused by the mountains and sought to dig through them with hoes and baskets. To move the mountain, he could only make one round trip between the mountain and his home in a year. When questioned as to the seemingly impossible nature of his task, the Foolish Old Man replied that while he may not finish this task in his lifetime, if he persevered, some day the mountains would be removed through the hard work of himself, his children, and their children, and so on through the many generations. The gods in Heaven, impressed with his hard work and perseverance, ordered the mountains to be separated.

=== Mao's speech ===
In a closing speech entitled "The Foolish Old Man Who Removed the Mountains" at the 7th National Congress of the Chinese Communist Party on June 11, 1945, Mao Zedong recounted the story, re-interpreting it as a call for collective action.

Today, two big mountains lie like a dead weight on the Chinese people. One is imperialism, the other is feudalism. The Chinese Communist Party has long made up its mind to dig them up. We must persevere and work unceasingly, and we, too, will touch God's heart. Our God is none other than the masses of the Chinese people. If they stand up and dig together with us, why can't these two mountains be cleared away?

== Impact ==
In the early days of the Cultural Revolution, all students in mainland China studied Quotations from Chairman Mao and the "Three Old Articles", and they were required to recite them. The "Three Old Articles" was taken as a required course for cultivating new communists.

During the phase of the Naxalite movement led by Charu Majumdar, the Three Constantly Read Articles were emphasized as part of the movement's political education.

== See also ==
- Cultural Revolution
- Mao Zedong
- Quotations from Chairman Mao
