= Chaoqi =

Chinese snack food

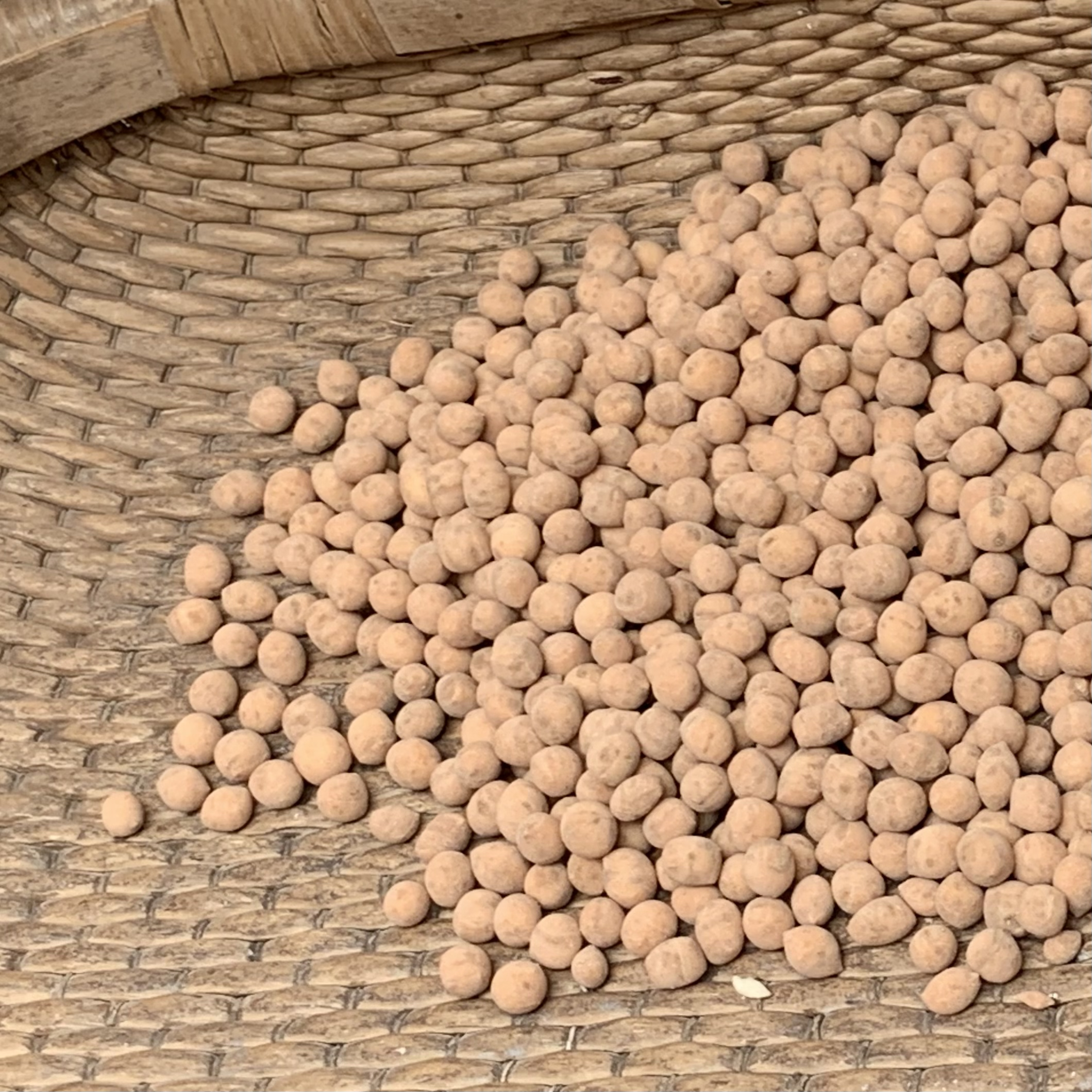
- Type: Food
- Place of origin: China
- Region or state: Yuanqu
- Main ingredients: Flour, edible oil, egg, sugar, salt, sesame
- Ingredients generally used: Milk, sesame, and five spices

Chaoqi (Chinese: 炒琪/炒祺) is a traditional Chinese snack. It is made with pieces of dough covered with Guanyin clay, a kind of clay soil. The primary materials for making Chaoqi are flour, edible oil, egg, sugar, and salt. It is often flavored with milk, sesame, and five-spice powder.

== History ==
Chaoqi originated in Yuanqu County, Shanxi province, China, over 4,000 years ago. Journeys were long, and travelers often felt nostalgic and unaccustomed to the climate outside of their hometown. As a result, they often brought Chaoqi with them because the dough is produced by the water, flour and soil from their hometown.

To prevent the dough from spoiling over time, it is covered with an outer layer of Guanyin clay. Chaoqi was listed as an intangible cultural heritage of Shanxi Province by UNESCO on April 24, 2009.

== Mythology ==
There exist multiple legends regarding the origin of Chaoqi. All of the legends are related to Mount Wangwu, a mountain located 45 kilometers (28 mi) north west of Jiyuan City in China’s Henan province. On top of the mountain's main peak is a stone altar where the legendary Yellow Emperor offered sacrifices to the gods.

=== The Legend of Yugong ===
In traditional Chinese legend, The Foolish Old Man Removes the Mountains, one of the mountains that Yugong moved is Mount Wangwu. To move the mountain, he could only make one round trip between the mountain and his home in a year. The food he brought on the road is Chaoqi.

=== The Legend of Guanyin ===
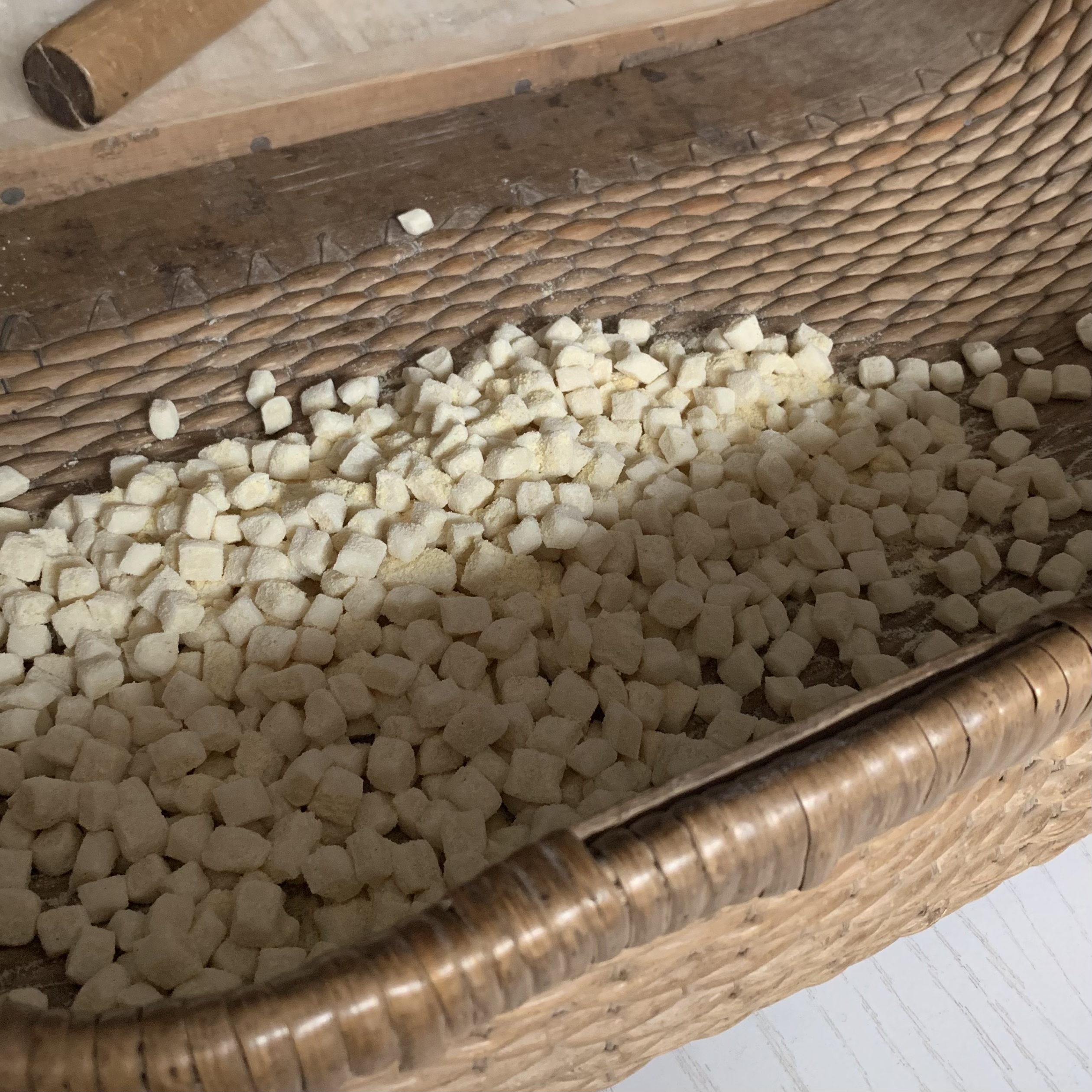
Dough Pieces of Chaoqi

In ancient times, in the area of Mount Wangwu, a strange disease suddenly spread. People got the symptom of gastrointestinal discomfort, but no one could be cured. They worshipped the heavens to seek help from God. Guanyin was moved and descended to the world. She took the earth from the top of the Temple of Heaven and fried the dough in the earth. She distributed it to the sick. Then those people recovered in a few days. After this, people called the soil Guanyin clay and handed down this snack-making process through the generations.

== Health value and hazards ==
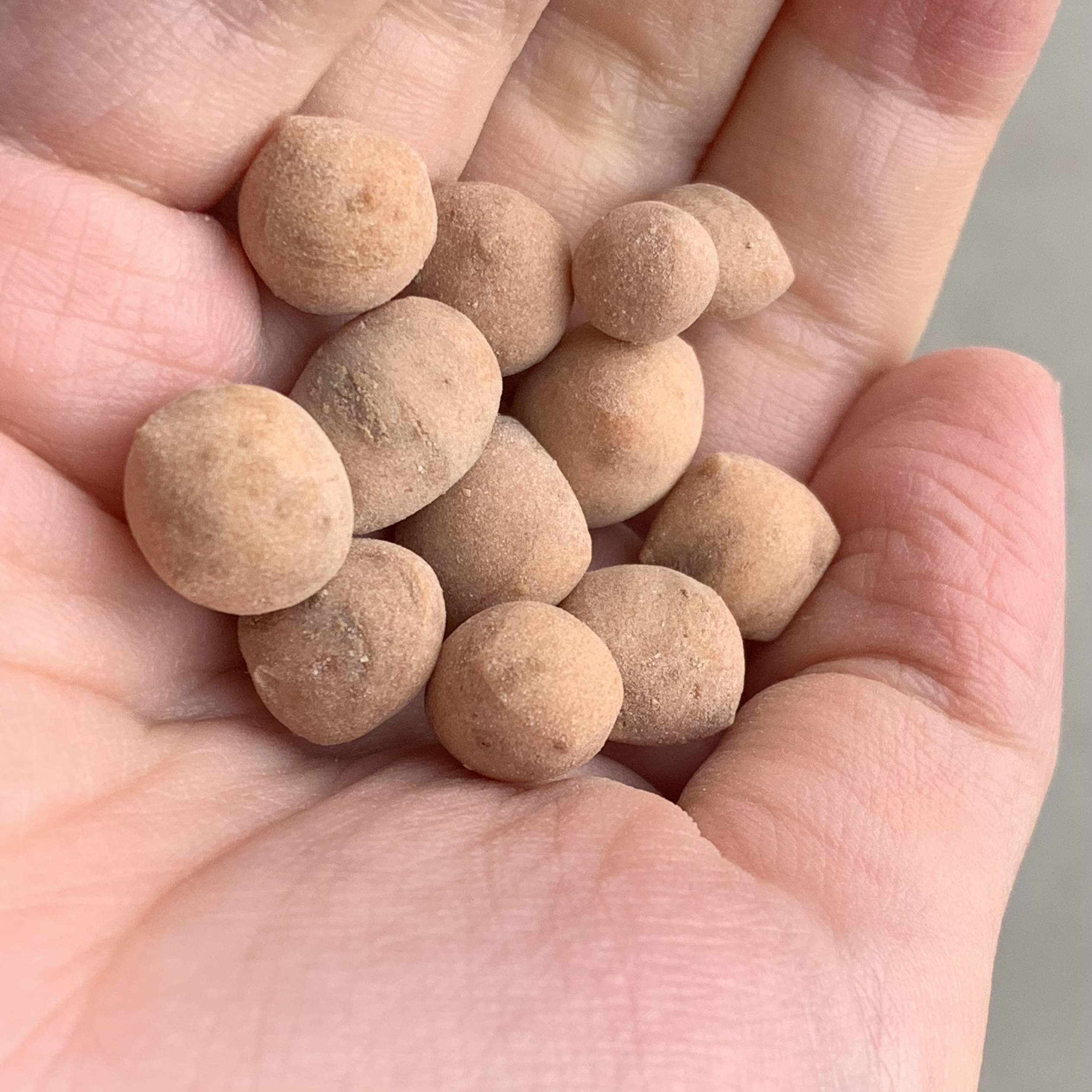
Chaoqi

Chaoqi is fried with Guanyin clay, also called kaolinite, which is a kind of bentonite. This dirt is found at Loess Plateau, Shanxi. It is a kind of traditional medicinal material recorded in Compendium of Materia Medica. In the past, it was called Bai'e (Chinese: 白堊). kaolinite contains the element of calcium, which is good for bone health and blood pressure. Guanyin clay can also draw out impurities and improve the immunity of the human's gut and stomach because the clay has adhesiveness, enabling the adhesion of the impurities in the human's body before they get discharged. Chaoqi can reduce diarrhea and nausea thanks to the binding effect of Guanyin clay. However, Guanyin clay is indigestible and poisonous at high doses.

Chaoqi only uses a small quantity of Guanyin clay. However, the poor often depended on eating Guanyin clay to survive during the Great Chinese Famine. This kind of clay could satisfy their hunger, but cannot be digested and absorbed by the human body. Enough consumption lead to bloating and make it difficult to defecate. It can also cause malnutrition. During famines, countless people suffocated to death due to gastrointestinal issues arising from eating Guanyin clay.

== Making procedure ==
1. Choose Guanyin clay and pulverize the soil block on the stone roll. Use the sieve to filter the soil and leave the fine earth. Use the fire to burn the clay.
2. Mix flour with seasoning to make the dough. Roll out the dough with a rolling pin and cut it into pieces.
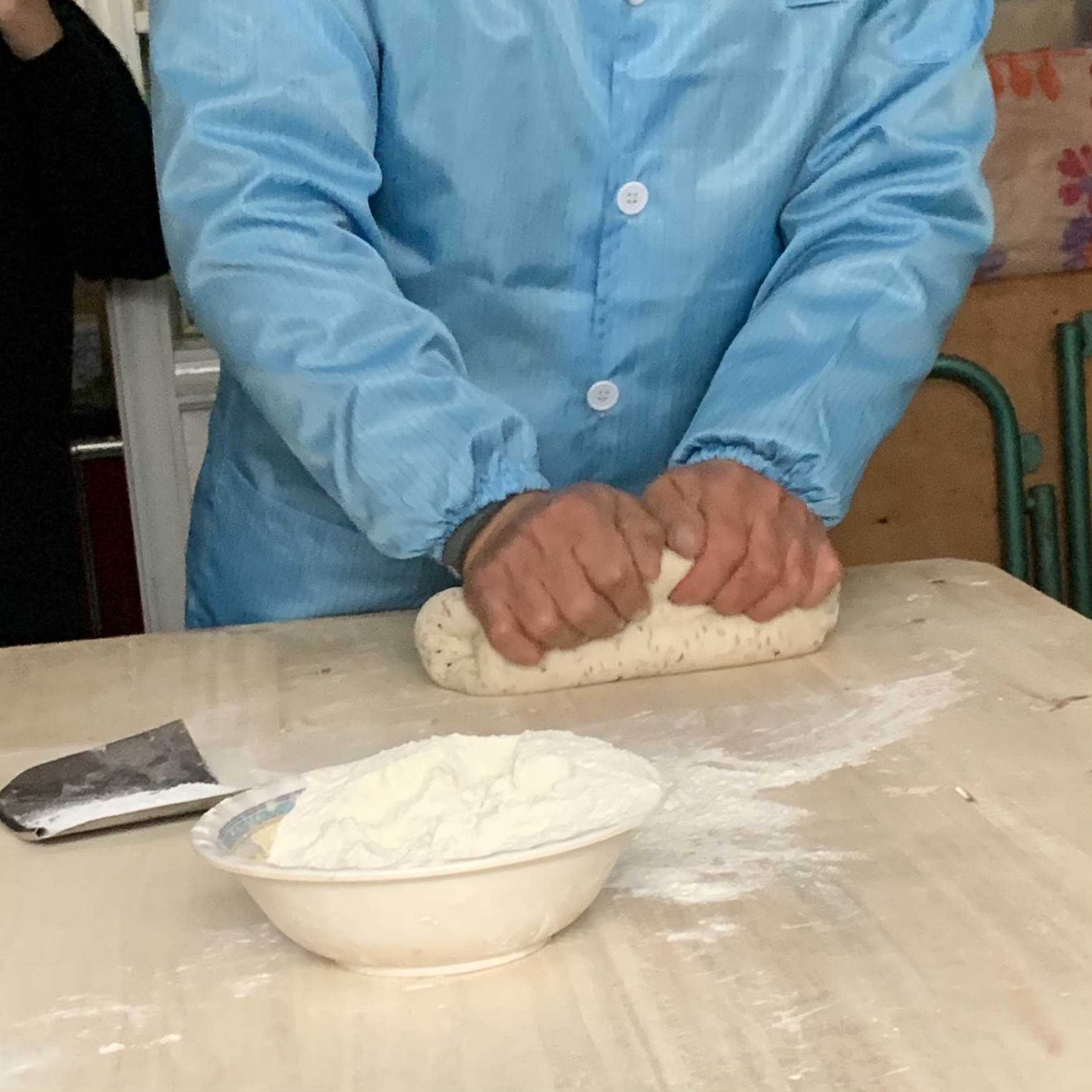
  Make the Dough
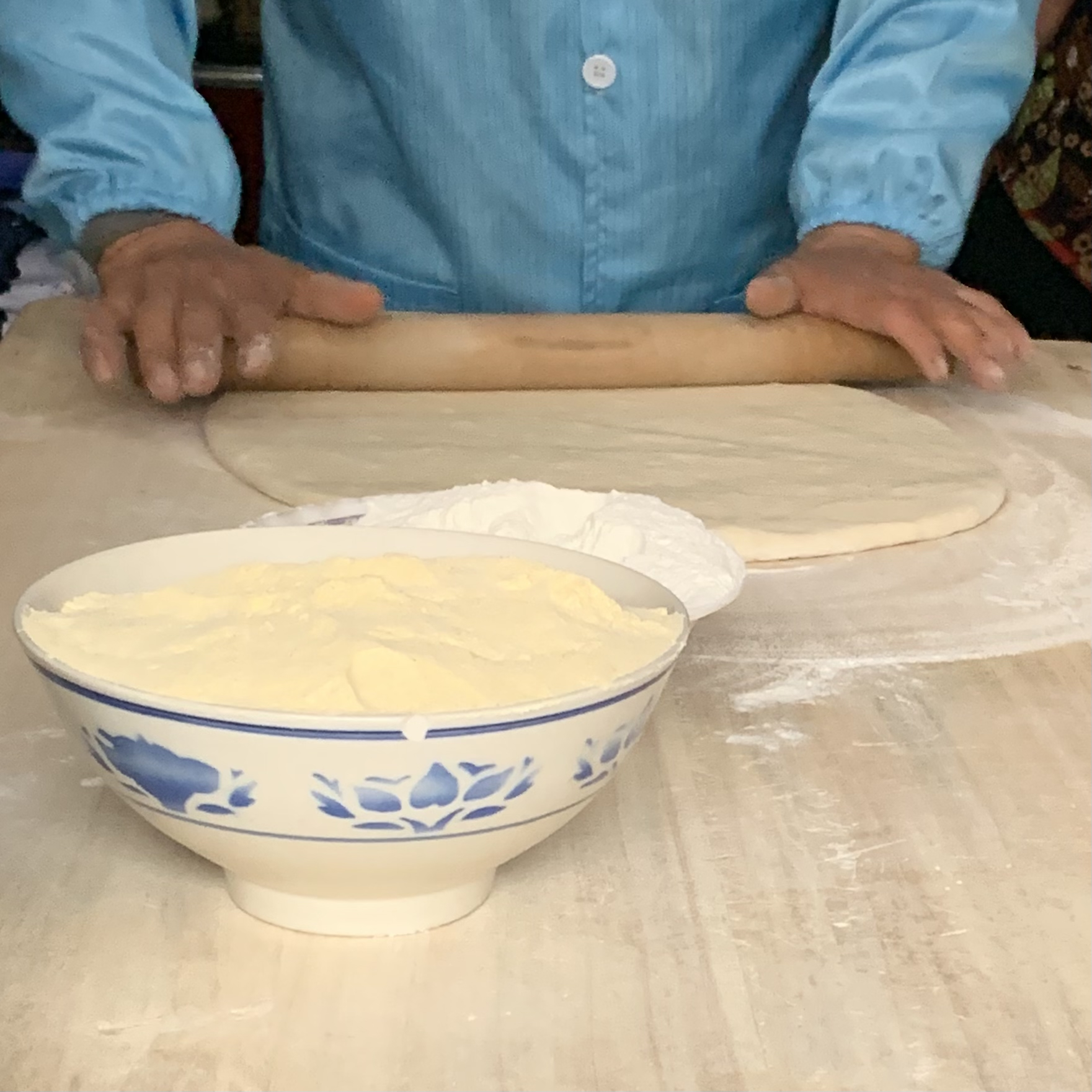
  Roll Out the Dough
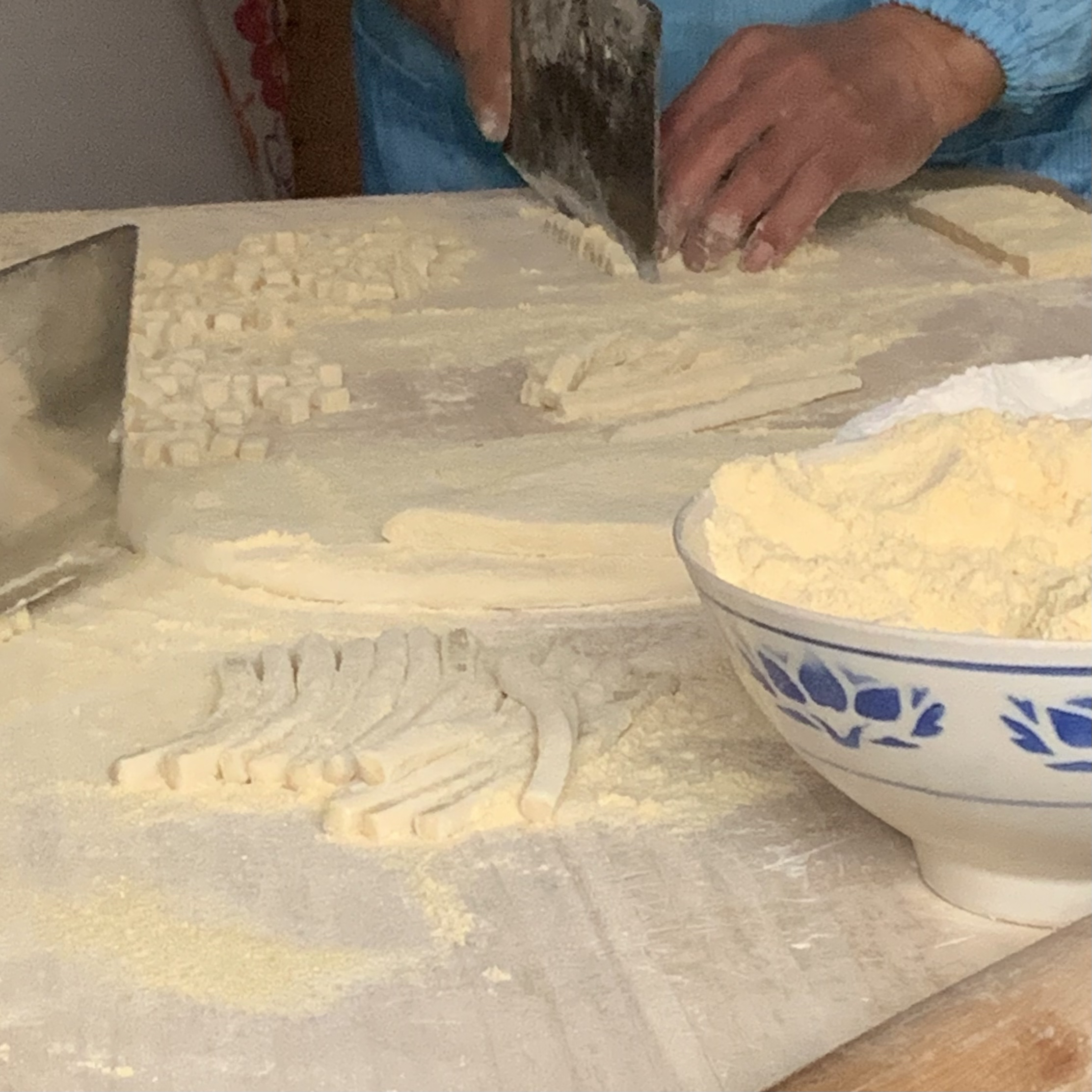
  Cut into Pieces
  Making Procedure 2
3. Put the dough pieces into the soil at high temperature and fry.
4. Knock the fried dough pieces to knock off the excess dirt.

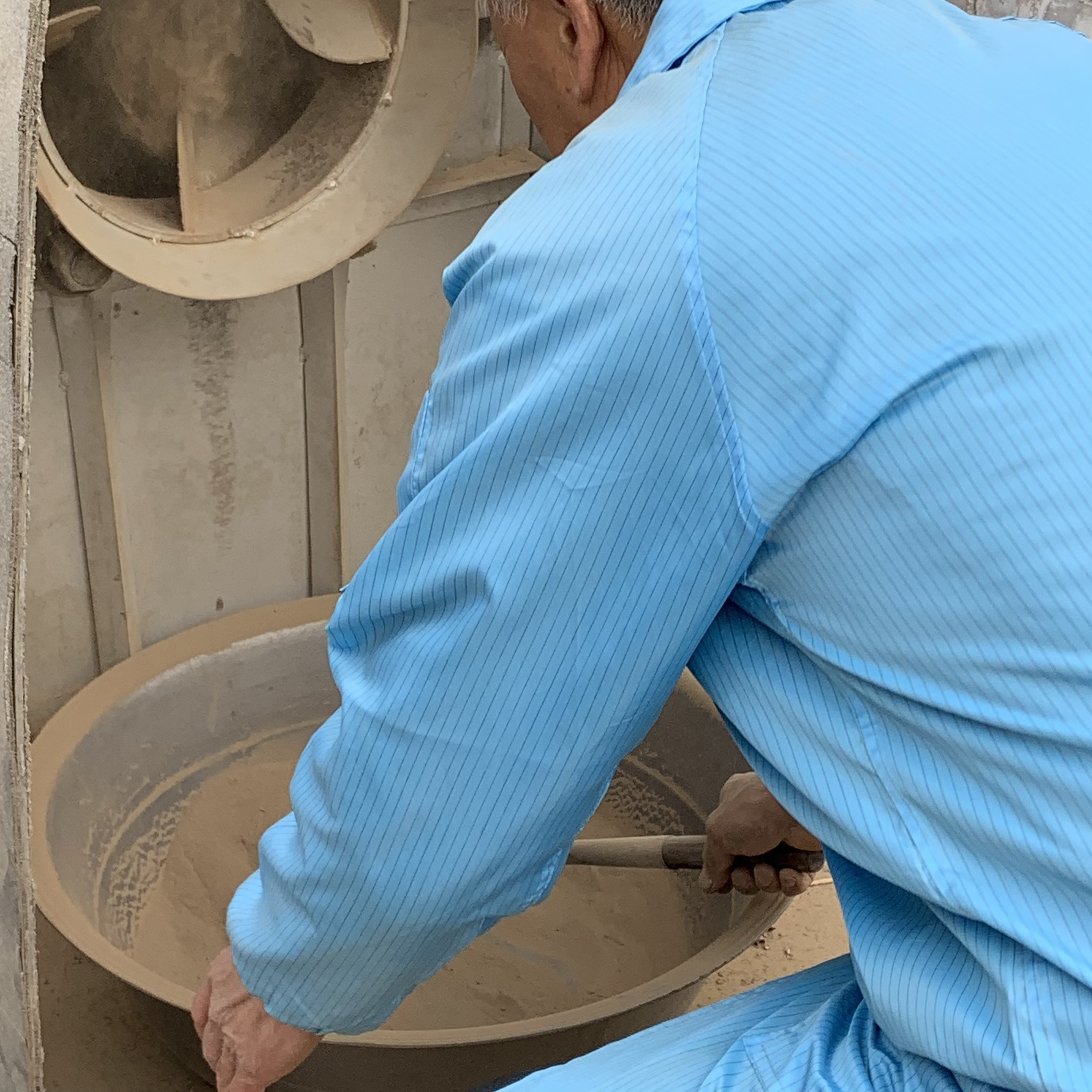
Making Procedure 3: Fry the Dough Pieces with Guanyin clay
