= Quotations from Chairman Mao Tse-tung =

1964 book of statements by Mao Zedong

Quotations from Chairman Mao Tse-tung "Chairman Mao's Quotations"
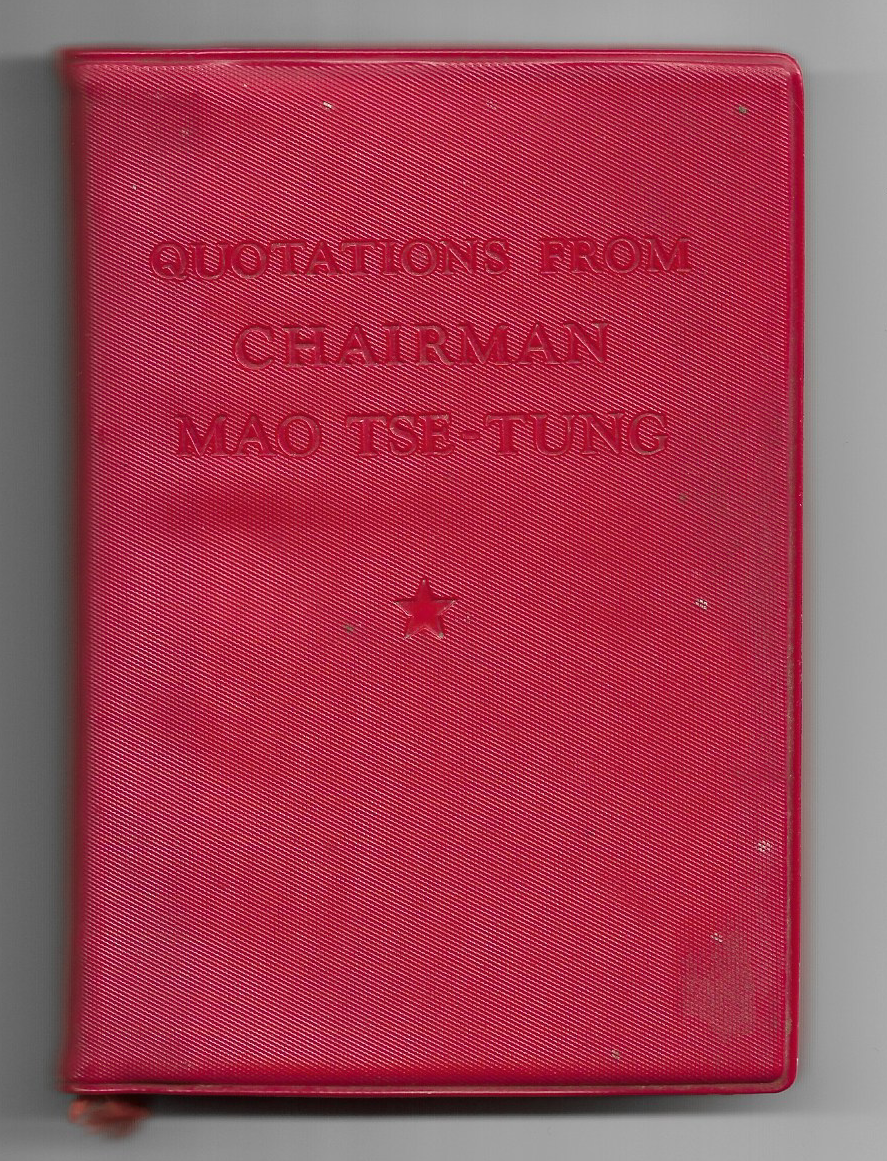
- Cover of the first English edition, c. 1966
- Editor: People's Liberation Army Daily
- Author: Mao Zedong (Mao Tse-tung); Hou Bo (photographer)
- Original title: 毛主席语录; Máo Zhǔxí Yǔlù
- Translator: Central Compilation and Translation Bureau
- Language: Chinese
- Publisher: People's Liberation Army General Political Department (initial releases); People's Press (officially and massively since 1965)
- Publication date: 5 January 1964
- Publication place: People's Republic of China
- Media type: Print (Hardback and Paperback)
- Pages: 311 (Foreign Languages Press, China Books & Periodicals, 1972)
- ISBN: 978-0-8351-2388-4
- OCLC: 23380824
- Dewey Decimal: 951.050924
- LC Class: DS778.M3 A5155

Quotations from Chairman Mao Tse-tung
- Simplified Chinese: 毛主席语录
- Traditional Chinese: 毛主席語錄
- Literal meaning: "Chairman Mao Quotes"
Transcriptions
Standard Mandarin
- Hanyu Pinyin: Máo Zhǔxí Yǔlù
- Bopomofo: ㄇㄠˊ ㄓㄨˇ ㄒㄧˊ ㄩˇ ㄌㄨˋ
- Wade–Giles: Mao^{2} Chu^{3}-hsi^{2} yü^{3}-lu^{4}
- Tongyong Pinyin: Máo Jhǔ-sí Yǔ-lù
- IPA: [mǎʊ ʈʂù.ɕǐ ỳ.lû]
Yue: Cantonese
- Yale Romanization: Mòuh Jyú-jihk Yúh-luhk
- Jyutping: mou4 zyu2 zik6 jyu5 luk6
- IPA: [mɔw˩ tsy˧˥ tsɪk̚˨ jy˩˧ lʊk̚˨]
Southern Min
- Hokkien POJ: Mô͘ Chú-se̍k Gú-lio̍k

Alternative Chinese name
- Simplified Chinese: 红宝书
- Traditional Chinese: 紅寶書
- Literal meaning: "Treasured Red Book"
Transcriptions
Standard Mandarin
- Hanyu Pinyin: Hóng bǎo shū
- Bopomofo: ㄏㄨㄥˊ ㄅㄠˇ ㄕㄨ
Yue: Cantonese
- Jyutping: hung4 bou2 syu1

Quotations from Chairman Mao (simplified Chinese: 毛主席语录; traditional Chinese: 毛主席語錄; pinyin: Máo Zhǔxí Yǔlù, commonly known as the "红宝书" pinyin: hóng bǎo shū during the Cultural Revolution), colloquially referred to in the English-speaking world as the Little Red Book, is a compilation book of quotations from speeches and writings by Mao Zedong (formerly romanized as Mao Tse-tung), the former chairman of the Chinese Communist Party, published from 1964 to 1979 and widely distributed during the Cultural Revolution.

== Publication process ==
Quotations from Chairman Mao Tse-tung was originally compiled by an office of the PLA Daily (People's Liberation Army Daily) as an ideological handbook. It developed out of Lin Biao's practice of incorporating the study of Mao's texts and model soldiers like Lei Feng into daily drills. Lin's approach became known as the "lively study, lively application" of Mao Zedong Thought. In 1961, Lin had required PLA Daily to publish a Mao quote each day to emphasise the central theme of the day's editorial. To facilitate this, PLA Daily editors used a Tianjin Daily index of Mao's quotes arranged by topic. The daily Mao quote became a popular feature and PLA Daily's use of the Tianjin Daily index became the core of Quotations from Chairman Mao.

In December 1963, a deputy editor-in-chief of the PLA Daily proposed compiling a selection of Mao's quotations in a book for use by the PLA. The response at a General Political Department work conference was strongly positive, and the initial draft was prepared as 200 Quotations from Chairman Mao. It was revised several times over the next few months based on input from conference participants and PLA units that piloted the study of the text.

In May 1964, the General Political Department released the internal publication Quotations from Chairman Mao, adding a half title page with the slogan "Workers of the world, unite!" (全世界无产者，联合起来！) in bold red letters, and endorsement leaves written by Lin Biao, Mao's chosen successor, that included three lines from the diary of model Lei Feng. This version had 30 topics under which 355 quotations were grouped. Following discussions that expanded the book twice more. The definitive 1965 version contained 33 thematic chapters of 427 total quotations excerpted from Mao's speeches and writing over the period 1929–1964. As of August 1965, new copies of the book had their distinct red vinyl covers (as opposed to the previously used white paper binding) to increase durability for fieldwork.

Demand for the book increased sharply including for use outside the military and in August 1966 People's Publishing House took over the work of printing Quotations. It was made available to the public through Xinhua Bookstores.

The Ministry of Culture held special study meetings to develop a production and distribution plan. It sought assurances that the book would receive publishing priority and that there would be sufficient paper, ink, and printing presses available. The goal was for "ninety-nine percent (of the population of China to) read Chairman Mao's book", according to a catalogue of publication records of the People's Publishing House. Provinces, municipalities, and autonomous regions across China were ordered to build hundreds of new printing houses to publish the Quotations during the second half of 1966, which pushed the limits of the Chinese printing industry.

This disrupted plans for publishing any new volumes of The Complete Works of Marx and Engels that was already in progress. It also halted distribution of other ideological works. As late as 1970, more than 8 million copies of the 4-volume set of Selected Works of Marx and Engels that had already been printed (both in cloth hardcover and paperback) remained undistributed in storage warehouses on the grounds that other works "should not interfere with learning Quotations from Chairman Mao Tse-Tung".

On the other hand, several other works by Mao had very large printings during the same period, even though these editions were not produced in the large numbers of Quotations from Chairman Mao. These include Selected Works of Mao Zedong (in four volumes, 2.875 million copies in 14 languages), Selected Articles of Mao Zedong (various editions totalling 252 million copies), single article books, and works of poetry.

The emphasis on Quotations started decreasing after the 9th Party Congress in April 1969.

On 12 February 1979, the Publicity Department of the Chinese Communist Party ordered a halt to publishing Quotations from Chairman Mao Tse-tung. The department stated that Quotations was a distortion of Mao Zedong Thought and had a "widespread and pernicious influence".

=== Formats ===
Earlier versions and predecessors of the compilation book featured blue or white covers and sleeves.

The most widely produced editions of the Quotations of Chairman Mao were published with a printed red vinyl cover wrapper over cardboard with pages bound in 64 folios that included photos of Mao. Other editions of the book were covered in cloth, silk, leather, paper, and other materials.

Most editions were produced in a functional, compact size that fit into a pocket, were easy to carry, and could be taken out at any time "for practice, learning, application." It was published in 32 other common sizes, allegedly the largest format printed on only four pages as large as the newspaper Reference News, and the smallest format the size of a matchbox.

== Content ==
Quotations from Chairman Mao Tse-Tung consists of 427 quotations, organized thematically into 33 chapters. It is also called "Thoughts of Chairman Mao" by many Chinese. The quotations range in length from a sentence to a few short paragraphs, and borrow heavily from a group of about two dozen documents in the four volumes of Mao's Selected Works.

Usually the quotations are arranged logically, to deal with one to three themes in the development of a chapter. The table below summarizes the book.

| Chapter | Number of quotations | Title | Summary |
|---|---|---|---|
| 1 | 13 | The Communist Party | The Chinese Communist Party is the core of the Chinese revolution, and its principles are based on Marxism–Leninism. Party criticism should be carried out within the Party. |
| 2 | 22 | Classes and Class Struggle | The revolution, and the recognition of class and class struggle, are necessary for peasants and the Chinese people to overcome both domestic and foreign enemy elements. This is not a simple, clean, or quick struggle. |
| 3 | 28 | Socialism and Communism | Socialism must be developed in China, and the route toward such an end is a democratic revolution, which will enable socialist and communist consolidation over a length of time. It is also important to unite with the middle peasants, and educate them on the failings of capitalism. |
| 4 | 16 | The Correct Handling of Contradictions Among the People | There are at least two basic kinds of contradiction: the antagonistic contradictions which exist between communist countries and their capitalist neighbors and between the people and the enemies of the people, and the contradictions among the people themselves, people unconvinced of China's new path, which should be dealt with in a democratic and non-antagonistic fashion. |
| 5 | 21 | War and Peace | War is a continuation of politics, and there are at least two types: just (progressive) and unjust wars, which only serve bourgeois interests. While no one likes war, we must remain ready to wage just wars against imperialist agitations. |
| 6 | 10 | Imperialism and All Reactionaries Are Paper Tigers | U.S. imperialism, European and Chinese reactionary forces represent real dangers, and in this respect are like real tigers. However, because the goal of our Communism is just, and reactionary interests are self-centered and unjust, after struggle, they will be revealed to be much less dangerous than they were earlier perceived to be. |
| 7 | 10 | Dare to Struggle and Dare to Win | Fighting is unpleasant, and the people of China would prefer not to do it at all. At the same time, they stand ready to wage a just struggle of self-preservation against reactionary elements, both foreign and domestic. |
| 8 | 10 | People's War | China's masses are the greatest conceivable weapon for fighting against Japanese imperialism and domestic reactionaries. Basic strategic points for war against the Kuomintang are also enumerated. |
| 9 | 8 | The People's Army | The People's Army is not merely an organ for fighting; it is also an organ for the political advancement of the Party, as well as of production. |
| 10 | 14 | Leadership of Party Committees | Internal life of the Party is discussed. Committees are useful to avoid monopolization by others, and Party members must demonstrate honesty, openness in discussing problems, and the ability to learn and multitask. |
| 11 | 22 | The Mass Line | The mass line represents the creative and productive energies of the masses of the Chinese population, which are potentially inexhaustible. Party members should take their cue from the masses, and reinterpret policy with respect to the benefit of the masses. |
| 12 | 21 | Political Work | It is necessary for intellectuals, students, soldiers and the average peasant to pay attention and involve themselves with political work. This is particularly true in wartime. |
| 13 | 7 | Relations Between Officers and Men | Non-antagonistic and democratic relations between officers and men make for a stronger army. |
| 14 | 6 | Relations Between the Army and the People | An army that is cherished and respected by the people, and vice versa, is a nearly invincible force. The army and the people must unite on the grounds of basic respect. |
| 15 | 8 | Democracy in the Three Main Fields | Democracy and honesty play roles in the reform of the army, as well as in the life of the Party, and of cadres. "Ultra-democracy", which is defined as an individualistic bourgeois aversion to discipline, is to be avoided. |
| 16 | 9 | Education and the Training of Troops | Education must have a practical and political basis for the army, Party and cadres. Along democratic lines, it will also be possible for the officers to teach the soldiers, for the soldiers to teach the officers, and for the soldiers to teach each other. |
| 17 | 9 | Serving the People | It is the duty of the cadres and the Party to serve the people. Without the people's interests constantly at heart, their work is useless. |
| 18 | 7 | Patriotism and Internationalism | The patriotism of a communist nation and an internationalist sympathy for just struggles in other countries are in no way exclusive; on the contrary, they are linked deeply, as communism spreads throughout the world. At the same time, it is important for a country to retain modesty, and shun arrogance. |
| 19 | 8 | Revolutionary Heroism | The same limitless creative energy of the masses is also visible in the army, in their fighting style and indomitable will. |
| 20 | 8 | Building Our Country Through Diligence and Frugality | China's road to modernization will be built on the principles of diligence and frugality. Nor will it be legitimate to relax if, 50 years later, modernization is realized on a mass scale. |
| 21 | 13 | Self-Reliance and Arduous Struggle | It is necessary for China to become self-reliant in the course of the revolution, along the usual lines of class struggle. At the same time, it is a mistake for individuals to only see the good or the bad in a system, to the exclusion of all else. The section ends with The Foolish Old Man Who Removed the Mountains (1945), which is the only text reproduced in full in Quotations. |
| 22 | 41 | Methods of Thinking and Methods of Work | Marxist dialectical materialism, which connotes the constant struggle between opposites in an empirical setting, is the best method toward constant improvement. Objective analysis of problems based on empirical results is at a premium. |
| 23 | 9 | Investigation and Study | It is necessary to investigate both the facts and the history of a problem in order to study and understand it. |
| 24 | 15 | Correcting Mistaken Ideas | Arrogance, lack of achievement after a prosperous period, selfishness, shirking work, and liberalism are all evils to be avoided in China's development. Liberalism is taken to mean that one may avoid conflict or work in order to be more comfortable for the moment, while the problem continues to grow. |
| 25 | 5 | Unity | Unity of the masses, the Party and the whole country is essential. At the same time, criticism may take place along comradely lines, while at the same time a basic unity is felt and preserved. This is the dialectical method. |
| 26 | 5 | Discipline | Discipline is seen not to be exclusive to democratic methods. Basic points of military conduct are also enumerated. |
| 27 | 15 | Criticism and Self-Criticism | Criticism is a part of the Marxist dialectical method which is central to Party improvement; as such, communists must not fear it, but engage in it openly. |
| 28 | 18 | Communists | A communist must be selfless, with the interests of the masses at heart. He must also possess a largeness of mind, as well as a practical, far-sighted mindset. |
| 29 | 11 | Cadres | Cadres, the instrument for uniting with and working for the people, must be leaders versed in Marxist–Leninism. They must have both guidance and the freedom to use their creative initiative in solving problems. Newer cadres and older cadres must work together with a comradely respect, learning from each other. |
| 30 | 7 | Youth | The Chinese Youth represent an active, vital force in China, to be drawn upon. At the same time, it is necessary to educate them, and for the Youth League to give special attention to their problems and interests. |
| 31 | 7 | Women | Women represent a great productive force in China, and equality among the sexes is one of the goals of communism. The multiple burdens which women must shoulder are to be eased. |
| 32 | 8 | Culture and Art | Literature and art are discussed with respect to communism, in an orthodox fashion. (Principally consisting of quotations from Talks at the Yenan Forum on Literature and Art.) |
| 33 | 16 | Study | It is the responsibility of all to cultivate themselves, and study Marxism–Leninism deeply. It is also necessary for people to turn their attention to contemporary problems, along empirical lines. |

== Distribution ==
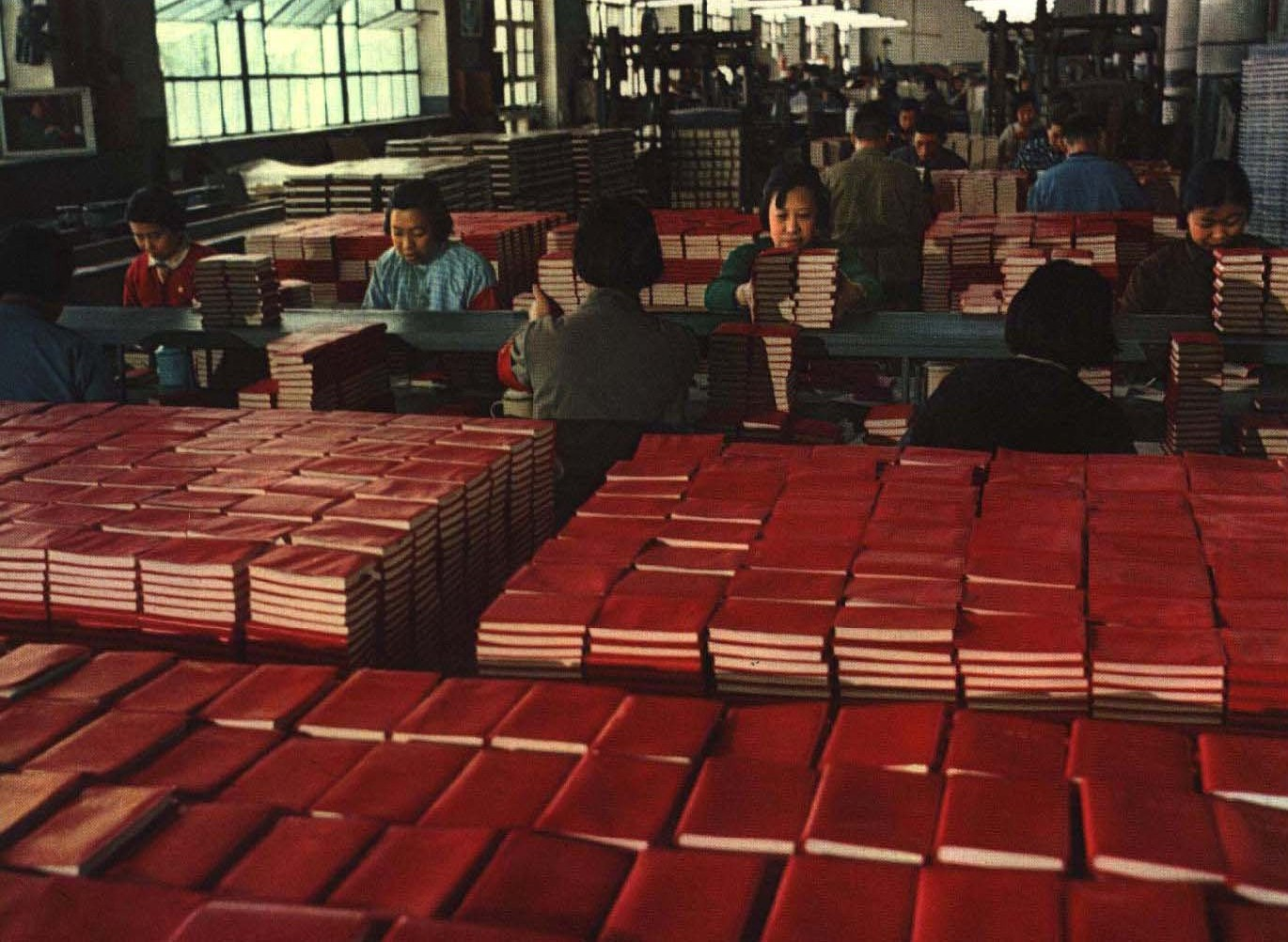
Little Red Book production in the Beijing Xinhua Printing Works factory, 1967

The book was known as the "Treasured Red Book" (simplified Chinese: 红宝书; traditional Chinese: 紅寶書; pinyin: hóng bǎoshū) or "Little Treasure Book" in China. From the mid-1960s through the mid-1970s, it was the most printed book globally. It has produced a wide array of sales and distribution figures. Some sources claim that over 6.5 billion printed volumes have been distributed in total, others contend that the distribution ran into the "billions", and others cite "over a billion" official volumes between 1966 and 1969 alone as well as "untold numbers of unofficial local reprints and unofficial translations."

The initial print run was distributed only within the PLA, with 4.2 million copies printed.

During the Learn from the People's Liberation Army campaign, the book became hugely popular among the revolutionary youth.

Demand grew so high that the PLA Publishing House's printing resourced became over extended, and after September 1964, printing moulds were provided to civilian printing presses at times to relieve the pressure. Twelve million copies had been printed by August 1965.

During the early phase of the Cultural Revolution, copies of quotations were frequently donated to those deemed the revolutionary masses. On National Day in 1966, one million copies were handed out to Red Guards who traveled to Beijing.

=== Overseas distribution ===
Outside China, the work was called the "Little Red Book" due to the red cover of its most widely printed version.

The Foreign Affairs Department of the State Council issued a March 1966 circular requesting any foreigners who had obtained a copy of Quotations to return it, stating that the book was for internal education and study only and was not a complete description of Mao Zedong Thought. This proved not practical and the next month the Central Propaganda Department stated that copies already distributed should not be recalled and that foreign experts and exchange students could request copies to borrow or buy.

In 1966, the Publicity Department of the Chinese Communist Party approved Quotations from Chairman Mao for export. To meet overseas requirements, the editors of the Chinese Foreign Languages Press made revisions necessitated by the situation. They added a "second edition preface" endorsement by Lin Biao, dated 16 December 1966 (which was torn out following Lin Biao's death and public disgrace in September 1971). On the last page, they listed the names of the publisher (PLA General Political Department) without an ISBN, the printer and distributor (both Xinhua Bookstore), and the publication year.

By May 1967, bookstores in 117 countries and territories around the world—including the United Kingdom, France, Spain, Japan, the Soviet Union, West Germany, Italy, Nepal, Indonesia, Philippines, Burma, Iran, various Arab and African nations and others—were distributing Mao's Quotations. It was translated into more than 50 languages.

After the 12 February 1979 directive withdrawing Quotations from circulation, foreigners seeking copies of Quotations were instead to be offered Mao's Selected Works.

== Social impact ==
=== China ===
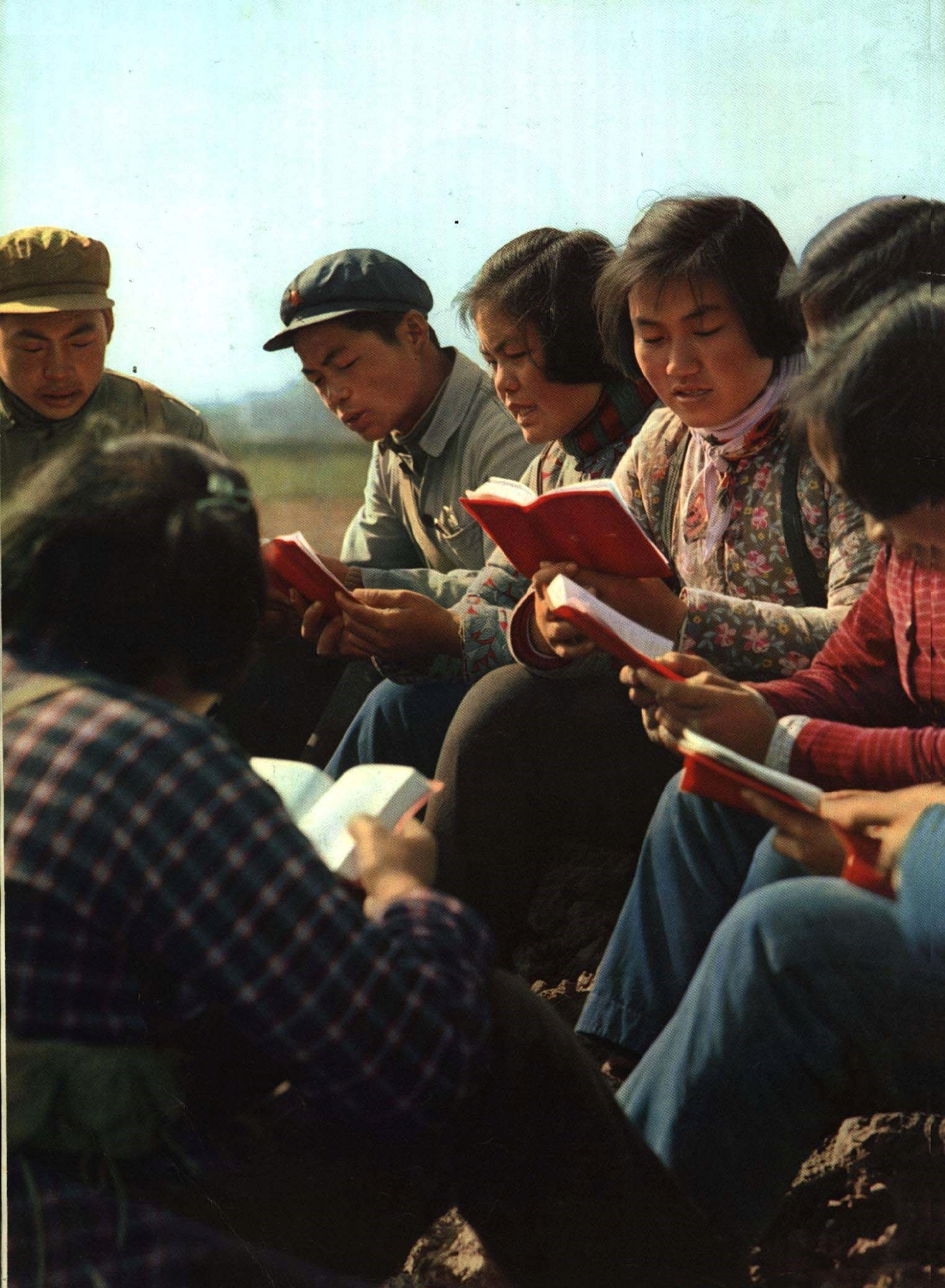
Red Guards reading the Little Red Book in 1967

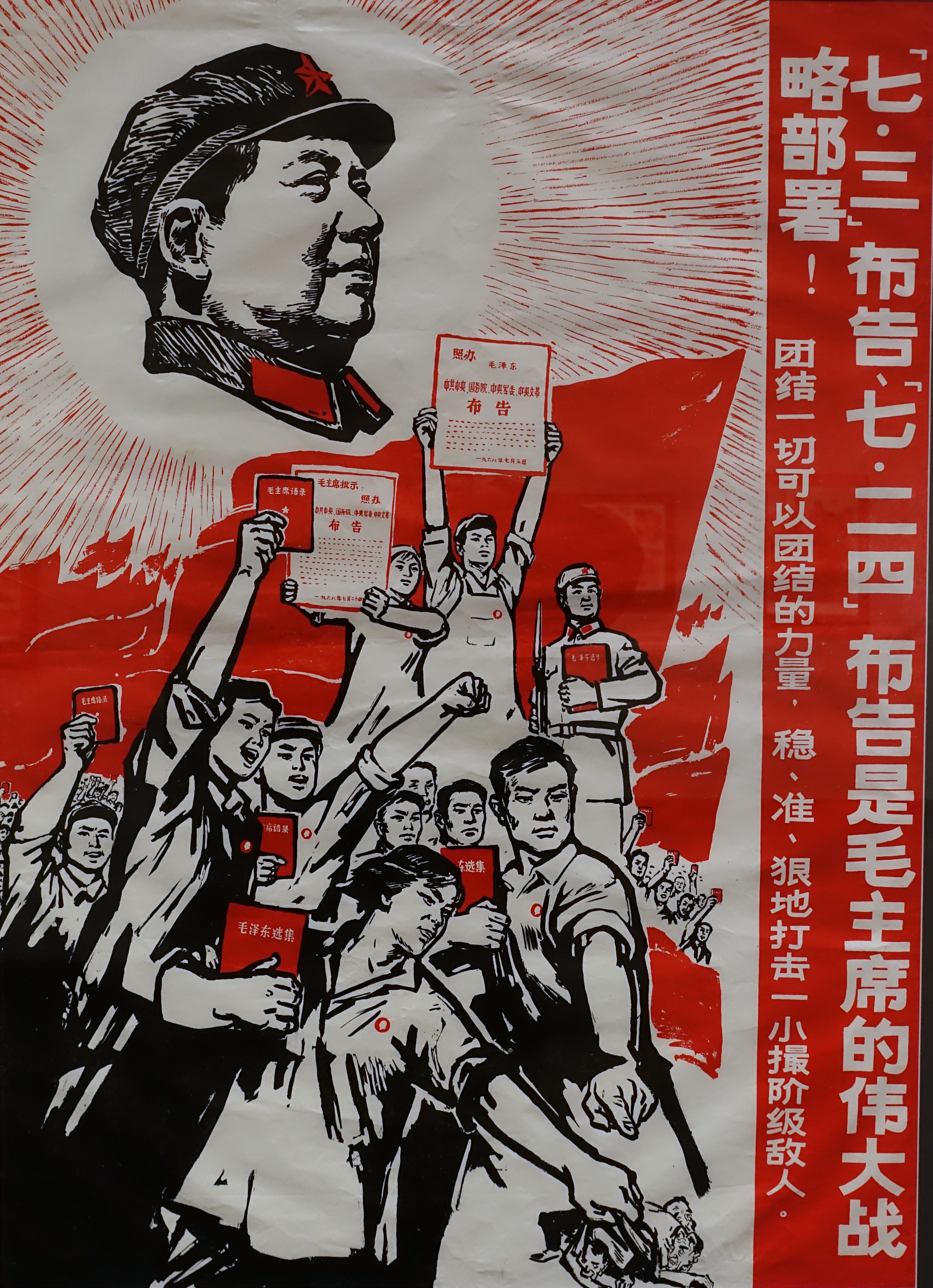
A propaganda poster from the Cultural Revolution featuring people holding the Little Red Book and wearing Mao badges

During the 1960s, the book was the single most visible icon in mainland China, even more visible than images of Mao himself. In posters and pictures created by the CCP's propaganda artists, nearly every painted character, whether smiling or looking determined, was seen with a copy of the book in his or her hand. During the Mao era, when people swore oaths, they would often do so on Quotations. After the end of the Cultural Revolution in 1976 and the rise of Deng Xiaoping in 1978, the importance of the book waned considerably, and the glorification of Mao's quotations was considered to be left deviationism and a cult of personality.

Quotations continues to be a symbol of Mao Zedong Thought in China today. In certain situations, the book is given as a gift, for example, when public funds are involved, or when personal events arise, such as congratulating newlyweds.

Today in China, Quotations from Chairman Mao Tse-Tung is mostly seen as a piece of nostalgia. It is difficult to find in bookstores. Rare and unusual printings can command extremely high prices from collectors. A 1964 version of the book was sold for US$15,000 by Sotheby's.

=== Africa ===
In Africa, Quotations helped inspire political texts including Quotations from President Karume and Axioms of Kwame Nkrumah.

=== Euro-American contexts ===
Assessing its legacy in the French Maoist context, Alain Badiou concludes that "Mao's Little Red Book has been our guide, not, as fools say, in the sense of a dogmatic catechism, but on the contrary, so that we can clarify and invent new behaviors in all sorts of disparate situations that were unfamiliar to us."

In the United States, Quotations was particularly popular among African American and Asian American radicals, who often viewed the text as a welcome departure from what they regarded as a typically Eurocentric body of theory.

According to Bobby Seale, in 1967 he and Huey P. Newton obtained copies of Quotations from the Chinese Book Store in San Francisco to sell at the University of California, Berkeley. With the proceeds, they purchased weapons to arm Black Panther Party members for self-defense against police brutality.

The Revolutionary Action Movement modeled its Code of Cadres on the "Three Main Rules of Discipline" section of Quotations.

In 1968, two American journalists published a collection of President Lyndon B. Johnson's quotes, Quotations from Chairman LBJ, in a satirical style modeled after the format of Chairman Mao's quotations. On the Danish rock band Kliché's debut album, Supertanker, the songs "Militskvinder" and "Masselinjen" drew on texts from the Quotations.

=== India ===
In India, Quotations gained popularity following the 1967 Naxalbari uprising and the beginning of the Naxalite–Maoist armed insurgency. The leader of the first phase of the Naxalite Movement, Charu Majumdar, placed major emphasis on the text, requiring it to be studied and to be read aloud to illiterate peasants. During this phase of the Naxalite Movement, Quotations was popular among both movement participants and those who sympathized with it. The Indian government banned Quotations beginning in the mid-1970s.

== See also ==
- Chairman Mao badge
- General Secretary Xi Jinping important speech series
- The Green Book (Gaddafi)
- History of the Communist Party of the Soviet Union (Bolsheviks)
- Little Red Songbook
- Three Old Articles (China)
