= Battle of Chuisha =

Date	301 BC
Location	Chuisha, modern-day Henan Province
Result	anti-Chu alliance victory

Belligerents
Qi; Wei; Han; Qin	Chu

Commanders and leaders
Kuang Zhang (Qi); Gongsun Xi (Wei); Bao Yuan (Han)	Tang Mei (KIA)

The Battle of Chuisha (Chinese: 垂沙之戰) took place in 301 BC in modern-day Henan between a 4-state alliance of Qi, Wei, Han and Qin against Chu. The Chu forces were defeated and their commanding general was killed.
