= Qiubo of Han =

Second head of the House of Han

Han Qiubo 韓賕伯

Leader of Han clan
- Predecessor: Viscount Wu
- Successor: Count Ding
- Issue: Count Ding (Han Jian)
Names
- Ancestral name: Jī (姬); Lineage name: Hán (韓); Given name: Qiúbó (賕伯)
- House: Ji
- Father: Viscount Wu (Han Wan)

Han Qiubo (Chinese: 韓賕伯; pinyin: Hán Qiúbó) was the second leader of the Han clan in the Jin state. He succeeded his father, Han Wan (Viscount Wu), as clan leader, and was in turn succeeded by his son, Han Jian (Count Ding).

Chinese royalty
Preceded by Wuzi of Han	House of Han	Succeeded by Dingbo of Han
