= Tang Mie =

Tang Mie or Tang Mo (Chinese: 唐眜; died 301 BC) was a Chinese general during the Warring States period. He was killed at the Battle of Chuisha in modern-day Henan Province leading the armies of Chu against a four-state anti-Chu alliance of Qi, Wei, Han and Qin.
