= Marquess Jing of Han =

Ruler of the Chinese state of Han from 408 BC to 400 BC

Marquess Jing of Han 韓景侯

Marquess of Han
- Reign: 403–400 BC
- Predecessor: New title
- Successor: Marquess Lie

Leader of Han clan
- Reign: 408–403 BC
- Predecessor: Viscount Wu of Han (韓武子)
- Successor: Became Marquess of Han
- Died: 400 BC
Names
- Ancestral name: Jī (姬); Lineage name: Hán (韓); Given name: Qián (虔)
Posthumous name
- Marquess Jing (景侯)
- House: Ji
- Dynasty: Han
- Father: Viscount Wu of Han

Chinese name
- Traditional Chinese: 韓景侯
- Simplified Chinese: 韩景侯
Transcriptions
Standard Mandarin
- Hanyu Pinyin: Hán Jǐng Hóu

Marquess Jing of Han (Chinese: 韓景侯; pinyin: Hán Jǐng Hóu; died 400 BC), personal name Han Qian, was leader of the Han clan in the Jin state from 408 BC to 403 BC, and the founding marquess of the Han state from 403 BC until his death in 400 BC. Marquess Jing was the son of Viscount Wu of Han (韓武子), whom he succeeded as leader of the Han clan. It was during Marquess Jing's rule that the Han state became a recognized vassal state of the Zhou dynasty.

In the first year of his reign, Marquess Jing attacked the Zheng state and took over Yongqiu (modern-day Qi County, Henan). The next year, his army lost to Zheng at Fushu (today's Dengfeng, Henan). In 403 BC, Marquess Jing, along with Marquess Wen of Wei and Marquess Lie of Zhao partitioned the powerful Jin state into the Han, Wei, and Zhao states, marking the beginning of the Warring States period of Chinese history and Han as an independent polity. King Weilie of Zhou was forced to elevate Marquess Jing's title from viscount (子) to marquess (侯). Marquess Jing then moved the capital of Han from Pingyang to Yangzhai. In 400 BC, Yangzhai was subject to a siege by the Zheng army. Marquess Jing died later that year and was succeeded by his son, Marquess Lie.

Chinese royalty
Preceded by Title Created	Marquess of Han; 408 BC – 400 BC	Succeeded by Marquess Lie of Han
