= Han Qi =

6th-century BC military leader and regent of Chinese state of Jin

Viscount Xuan of Han 韓宣子

Leader of Han clan
- Predecessor: Viscount Xian of Han
- Successor: Viscount Zhen of Han (韓貞子)
- Issue: Viscount Zhen (Han Xu)
Names
- Ancestral name: Jī (姬); Lineage name: Hán (韓); Given name: Qǐ (起)
Posthumous name
- Viscount Xuan (宣子)
- House: Ji
- Father: Viscount Xian (Han Jue)

Han Qi (Chinese: 韓起), also known by his posthumous name as the Viscount Xuan of Han (Chinese: 韓宣子; pinyin: Hán Xuān Zǐ), was a leader of the Han clan in the Jin state. He was the son of Han Jue (Viscount Xian), and served as zhengqing (正卿) and zhongjunjiang of Jin between 541 and 514 BCE.

In 541 BCE, he succeeded Zhao Wu (Viscount Wen of Zhao) and became the 15th zhongjunjiang of the Jin state. Henceforth, he governed Jin until his death. He was the longest serving zhengqing and zhongjunjiang of Jin. During his regency, Jin annexed the Fei (肥) state (modern-day Gaocheng District, Shijiazhuang) in 530 BC, the tribe of Luhun Rong (陸渾戎) in 525 BC, and the Gu (鼓) state in 520 BC.

Although Han Qi held the post of zhongjunjiang for 27 years, he was largely absent from the central political arena of Jin. Xun Wu, Shi Yang, Xun Li, and the heads of Zhonghang, Fan, and Zhi clans controlled the Jin state and its army. They implemented a policy of expansion but only focused on minor states. Chu, a major enemy of Jin, was ignored by Jin during his rule.

After Han Qi's death, his son, Han Xu (韓須; Viscount Zhen), succeeded him as the head of the Han clan. Wei Shu (魏舒) succeeded Han Qi to the posts of zhengqing and zhongjunjiang of Jin.

Chinese royalty
| Preceded by Xianzi of Han | House of Han | Succeeded by Zhenzi of Han |
Political offices
| Preceded by Zhao Wu | Zhengqing of Jin; 541 BC – 514 BC | Succeeded by Wei Shu (魏舒) |
