= Han Jue =

Viscount Xian of Han 韓獻子

Leader of Han clan
- Predecessor: Han Yu
- Successor: Viscount Xuan
- Issue: Han Wuji; Han Qi (Viscount Xuan)
Names
- Ancestral name: Jī (姬); Lineage name: Hán (韓); Given name: Jué (厥)
Posthumous name
- Viscount Xian (獻子)
- House: Ji
- Father: Han Yu

Han Jue (Chinese: 韓厥; died after 566 BC), also known by his posthumous name as the Viscount Xian of Han (Chinese: 韓獻子; pinyin: Hán Xiàn Zǐ), was a leader of the Han clan in the Jin state, where he served as dafu (大夫). He was the son of Han Yu, whom he succeeded as Han clan leader.

Han Jue's father died early and he was raised by Zhao Dun (Viscount Xuan of Zhao), a senior Jin minister. Han Jue later became sima on Zhao Dun's recommendation. As sima, Han Jue participated in the Battle of Bi (597 BC) and the Battle of An (589 BC). According to the Zuo Zhuan, his father appeared in a dream the night before the Battle of An and warned him not to ride in the left or right side of the chariot to avoid being killed by Duke Qing of Qi. During the battle, the soldiers to Han Jue's left and right were shot by arrows. In 583 BC, he supported Zhao Dun's grandson, Zhao Wu (Viscount Wen of Zhao), to head the Zhao clan. In the Battle of Masui (麻隧之戰; 578 BC), Han Jue commanded the Jin army's left wing. During the Battle of Yanling (575 BC), he again commanded the Jin army's left wing and led a successful flanking maneuver against the Chu state. In 573 BC, he became Jin's zhengqing (正卿), the highest ministerial office in Ancient China. Han Jue retired in 566 BC due to old age.

Han Jue was played by Huang Xiaoming in the 2010 film Sacrifice.

Chinese royalty
Preceded by Ziyu of Han	House of Han	Succeeded by Xuanzi of Han
Political offices
Preceded by Luan Shu (栾书)	Zhengqing of Jin; 573 BC – 566 BC	Succeeded by Zhi Ying (智罃)
