= Han Jian (Zhou dynasty) =

Third head of the House of Han

Count Ding of Han 韓定伯

Leader of Han clan
- Predecessor: Han Qiubo
- Successor: Han Yu
- Issue: Han Yu
Names
- Ancestral name: Jī (姬); Lineage name: Hán (韓); Given name: Jiǎn (簡)
Posthumous name
- Count Ding (定伯)
- House: Ji
- Father: Han Qiubo

Han Jian (Chinese: 韓簡; pinyin: Hán Jiǎn), also known by his posthumous name as the Count Ding of Han or Earl Ding of Han, was a leader of the Han clan in the Jin state, where he served as dafu (大夫). He was the son of Han Qiubo.

In 645 BC, Duke Mu of Qin invaded the Jin state at Han Jian's fief. Duke Hui of Jin asked Han Jian to scout the enemy. Han Jian reported that while the enemy had fewer men, their battle strength exceeds that of Jin. Duke Hui of Jin did not heed Han Jian's words and sent him to deliver the intent to battle. In the ensuing battle, Duke Hui of Jin and Han Jian were both captured and taken to the Qin state.

Han Jian was succeeded by his son, Han Yu, as leader of the Han clan.

Chinese royalty
| Preceded by Qiubo of Han | House of Han | Succeeded by Ziyu of Han |
