= The Foolish Old Man Removes the Mountains =

Fable in Chinese mythology

The Foolish Old Man Removes the Mountains (Chinese: 愚公移山; pinyin: Yúgōng Yíshān) is a well-known fable from Chinese mythology about the virtues of perseverance and willpower. The tale first appeared in Book 5 of the Liezi, a Daoist text of the 4th century BC, and was retold in the Garden of Stories by the Confucian scholar Liu Xiang in the 1st century BC. It was also used by Mao Zedong in a famous speech in 1945.

== Story ==
The myth concerns a foolish old man of 90 years who lived near a pair of mountains (given in some tellings as the Taihang and the Wangwu mountains, in Yu Province). He was annoyed by the obstruction caused by the mountains and sought to dig through them with hoes and baskets. To move the mountain, he could only make one round trip between the mountain and his home in a year. The food he brought on the road to last him through this difficult time was Chaoqi. When questioned as to the seemingly impossible nature of his task, the foolish old man replied that while he might not finish this task in his lifetime, through the hard work of himself, his children, and their children, and so on through many generations, some day the mountains would be removed if he persevered. The gods in Heaven, impressed with his hard work and perseverance, ordered the mountains separated.

== Mao's speech ==
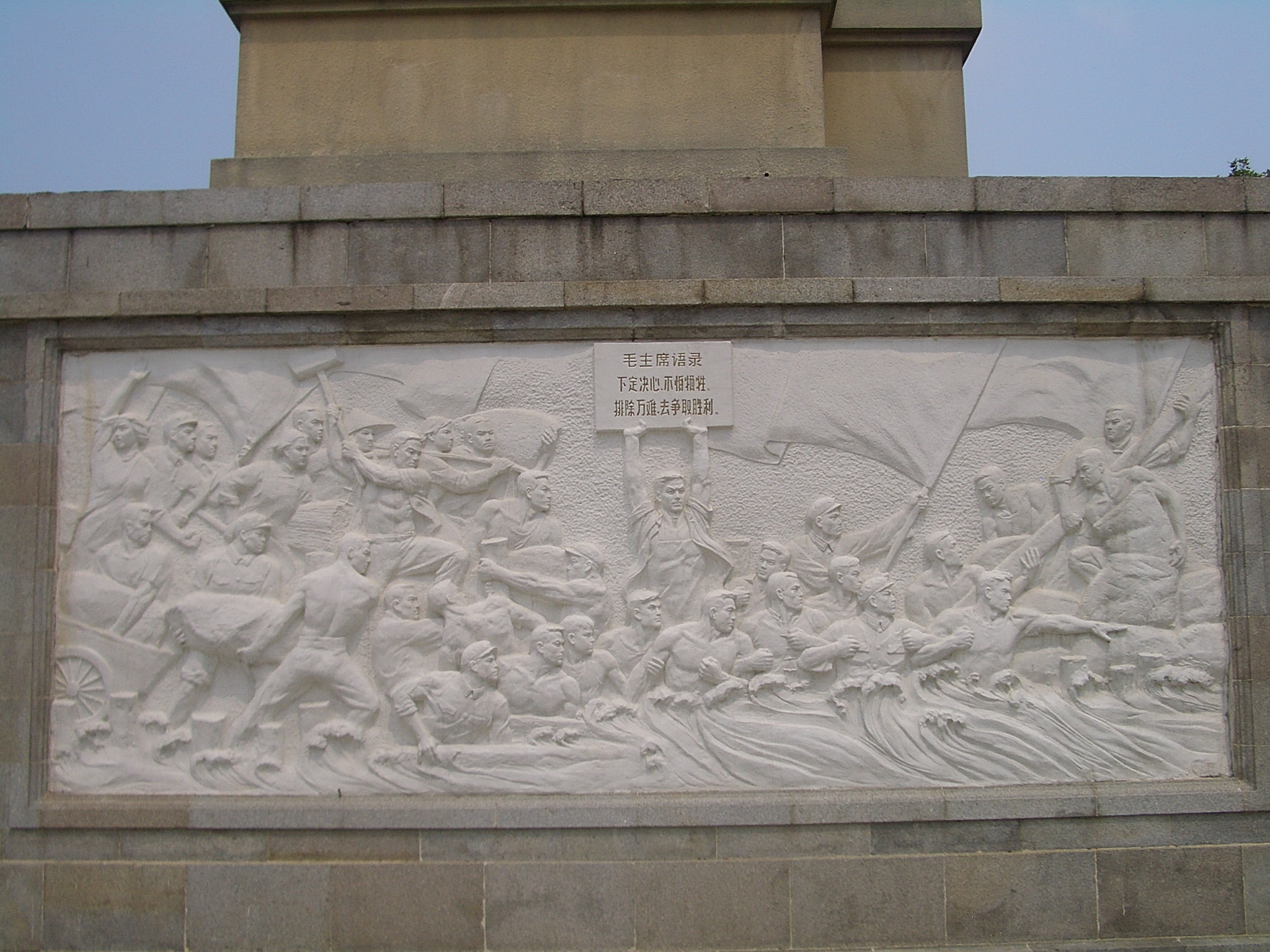
Wuhan memorial to the 1954 Yangtze River Floods, including a quotation from Mao's speech

In a speech at Yan'an on 11 June 1945, Mao Zedong recounted the story, re-interpreting it as a call for collective action:

Today, two big mountains lie like a dead weight on the Chinese people. One is imperialism, the other is feudalism. The Chinese Communist Party has long made up its mind to dig them up. We must persevere and work unceasingly, and we, too, will touch God's heart. Our God is none other than the masses of the Chinese people. If they stand up and dig together with us, why can't these two mountains be cleared away?

Mao's use of the story was intended to convey his strong affirmation of the revolutionary will. Academic Cai Xiang writes that Mao's usage also illustrates the power of the people to reconfigure their relationship with nature and that the speech can be read as part of the basis for a socialist-era philosophy of the environment.

The speech was later published in essay form. It was often assigned reading for workers during the Third Front campaign to develop basic industry and national defense industry in China's interior. Together with Serve the People and Memory of Norman Bethune (紀念白求恩), it was one of the Three Constantly Read Articles, included in Quotations from Chairman Mao Zedong, and was memorized by schoolchildren during the Cultural Revolution. During the Cultural Revolution, its popularity was driven by the story's significance as a demonstration of how impossible things can become possible.

It is the only text reproduced in its entirety in Quotations from Chairman Mao. It concludes the section on "Self-Reliance and Arduous Struggle".

== See also ==
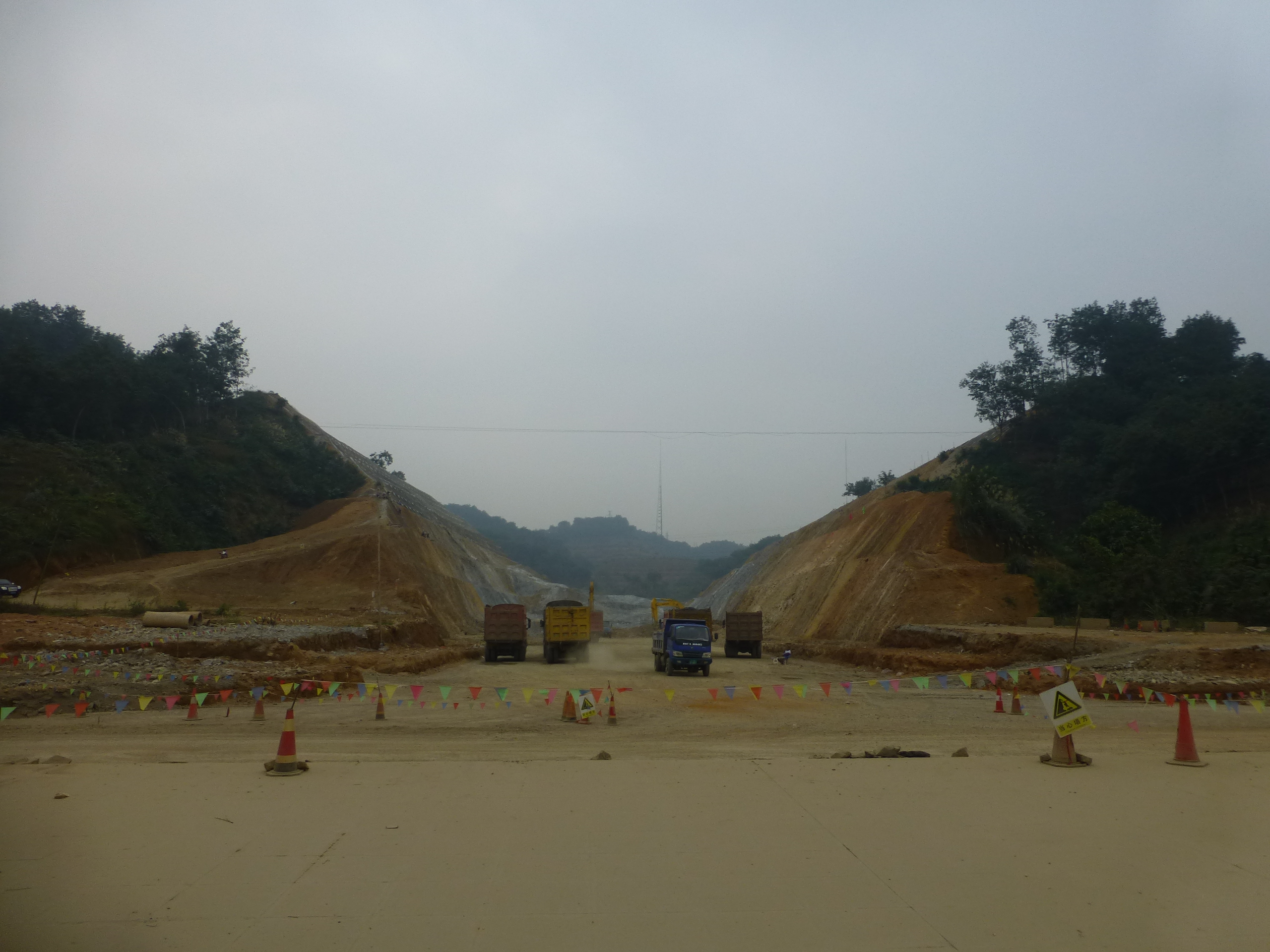
Hekou County removes part of a mountain to connect the new Hekou North Railway Station with Hekou Town

- How Yukong Moved the Mountains, a French documentary film
- Sisyphus, a similar Greek myth with a darker inflection
- Dashrath Manjhi, an Indian man who singlehandedly cut a path through a mountain over 22 years
