= Marquess Gong of Han =

Marquess of Han from 374 BC to 363 BC

Marquess Gong of Han 韓共侯

Marquess of Han
- Reign: 374–363 BC
- Predecessor: Marquess Ai
- Successor: Marquess Xi (韓釐侯)
- Died: 363 BC
Names
- Ancestral name: Jī (姬); Lineage name: Hán (韓); Given name: Ruòshān (若山)
Posthumous name
- Marquess Gong (共侯) or Marquess Gong (恭侯) or Marquess Yi (懿侯) or Marquess Zhuang (莊侯)
- House: Ji
- Dynasty: Han
- Father: Marquess Ai

Marquess Gong of Han (Chinese: 韓共侯; pinyin: Hán Gòng Hóu; died 363 BC), personal name Han Ruoshan (韓若山), was the ruler of the Han state from 374 BC until his death in 363 BC. He was the son of Marquess Ai, whom he succeeded.

After Marquess Ai was killed, the nobles supported Marquess Gong to be the next ruler of Han. After Marquess Gong died due to illness in 363 BC, the throne then passed to Marquess Xi (韓釐侯), another son of Marquess Ai.

Chinese royalty
Preceded by Marquess Ai of Han	Marquess of Han; 374 BC – 363 BC	Succeeded by Marquess Xi of Han
