= Ziyu (Han Clan) =

Han Yu 韓輿

Leader of Han clan
- Predecessor: Count Ding
- Successor: Viscount Xian
- Issue: Han Jue (Viscount Xian)
Names
- Ancestral name: Jī (姬); Lineage name: Hán (韓); Given name: Yú (輿)
- House: Ji
- Father: Han Jian (Count Ding)

Han Yu (Chinese: 韓輿), also known as Ziyu (子輿), was a leader of the Han clan in the Jin state. He was the son of his predecessor, Han Jian (Count Ding). He was succeeded by his son Han Jue (Viscount Xian).

Chinese royalty
Preceded by Dingbo of Han	House of Han	Succeeded by Xianzi of Han
