= Marquess Lie of Han =

Ruler of the Chinese State of Han from 399 BC to 387 BC

Marquess Lie of Han 韓烈侯

Marquess of Han
- Reign: 399–387 BC
- Predecessor: Marquess Jing
- Successor: Marquess Wen
- Died: 387 BC
Names
- Ancestral name: Jī (姬); Lineage name: Hán (韓); Given name: Qǔ (取)
Posthumous name
- Marquess Lie (烈侯) or Marquess Wu (武侯)
- House: Ji
- Dynasty: Han
- Father: Marquess Jing

Marquess Lie of Han (Chinese: 韓烈侯; pinyin: Hán Lìe Hóu), also known as Marquess Wu of Han (韓武侯), personal name Han Qu (韓取), was a monarch of the Han state. Reigning from 399 BC until his death in 387 BC, he was the son of the founding ruler, Marquess Jing.

In the first years of Marquess Lie's rule, his uncle Han Xialei (韓俠累) served as the state's chancellor. A power struggle between Han Xialei and another minister, Yan Sui (嚴遂), developed into a deep resentment between the two. In 397 BC, Yan Sui paid a huge sum to the assassin Nie Zheng (聶政) to have Han Xialei assassinated. In 394 BC, the Han state defended the Lu state from a Qi invasion. In 391 BC, the Qin state invaded Yiyang and took six pieces of land. Marquess Lie died in 387 BC and was succeeded by his son, Marquess Wen.

== Sources ==
- Shiji Chapter 45
- Zizhi Tongjian Volume 1

Chinese royalty
Preceded by Marquess Jing of Han	Marquess of Han; 399 BC – 387 BC	Succeeded by Marquess Wen of Han
