= Han Wan =

8th-century BC progenitor of the House of Han

Viscount Wu of Han 韓武子

Leader of Han clan
- Successor: Qiubo
- Issue: Qiubo
Names
- Ancestral name: Jī (姬); Lineage name: Hán (韓); Given name: Wàn (萬)
Posthumous name
- Viscount Wu (武子)
- House: Ji
- Father: Huan Shu of Quwo

Han Wan (Chinese: 韓萬), also known by his posthumous name as the Viscount Wu of Han, was the first leader of Han clan in the Jin state. He was the son of Huan Shu of Quwo, half-brother of Count Zhuang of Quwo, and the progenitor of the Han state.

Han Wan was a charioteer for his nephew, Duke Wu of Quwo, and helped to kill Marquess Ai of Jin. Duke Wu of Quwo then took over the throne of Jin, and bestowed Han Wan the land of Han. Han Wan's descendants later adopted "Han" as the clan name based on the name of the fief.

Han Wan's descendants became high-ranking officials in the Jin state. The family became very powerful and eventually partitioned the Jin state.

Chinese royalty
Preceded by New Creation	House of Han	Succeeded by Qiubo of Han
