= Zheng Guo =

Chinese hydraulic engineer

- Traditional Chinese: 鄭國
- Simplified Chinese: 郑国
Transcriptions
Standard Mandarin
- Hanyu Pinyin: Zhèng Guó
- Wade–Giles: Cheng Kuo

Zheng Guo (fl. third century BCE) was a Chinese hydraulic engineer who lived towards the end of the Warring States period. He is best known for designing the Zhengguo Canal, which was named after him.

== Life ==
Zheng Guo was from the Han state. In the third century BCE, near the end of the Warring States period, the Qin state in western China was making aggressive advances towards the other six major states in the east. The Han state, which shared borders with the Qin state, heard that the Qin state liked to carry out large-scale construction works and projects, so they sent Zheng Guo to persuade the Qin state to build a canal connecting the Jing and Luo rivers to irrigate the Guanzhong plain and boost agricultural productivity. The plan was actually meant to distract the Qin state and keep it busy, so as to prevent it from attacking the other states.

During the construction phase, the Qin state discovered Zheng Guo's ulterior motive in asking them to build the canal, and wanted to execute him. However, Zheng Guo said, "I started as a spy working for the Han state, but once the canal is built, it is beneficial to the Qin state. Although I can prolong the Han state's existence by doing this, at the same time I am also helping the Qin state make a great achievement worthy of history." The Qin state agreed and ordered him to finish building the canal. Once completed, the canal and its irrigation works largely boosted agricultural productivity in the Qin state.

In manga Kingdom, he was referred as "The man who solved the Qin problem of flooding".
