= Marquess Wen of Han =

Ruler of the State of Han from 386 to 377 BC

Marquess Wen of Han 韓文侯

Marquess of Han
- Reign: 386–377 BC
- Predecessor: Marquess Lie
- Successor: Marquess Ai
- Died: 377 BC
Names
- Ancestral name: Jī (姬); Lineage name: Hán (韓); Given name: Unknown
Posthumous name
- Marquess Wen (文侯)
- House: Ji
- Dynasty: Han
- Father: Marquess Lie

Marquess Wen of Han (Chinese: 韓文侯; pinyin: Hán Wén Hóu; died 377 BC), personal name unknown, was marquess of the Han state between 386 BC and until his death in 377 BC. He was the son of Marquess Lie. Marquess Wen oversaw a rise in the state's prosperity and launched several military campaigns. In 385 BC, Marquess Wen attacked the Zheng state and took Yangcheng. In the same year, Han attacked the Song state, reaching Pengcheng, and took Duke Dao of Song (宋悼公) prisoner. In 380 BC, an alliance of Han, Zhao, and Wei attacked the Qi state, reaching Sangqiu. Two years later in 378 BC, the alliance attacked Qi again, reaching Lingqiu. Marquess Wen died in 377 BC and was succeeded by his son, Marquess Ai.

Chinese royalty
Preceded by Marquess Lie of Han	Marquess of Han; 386 BC – 377 BC	Succeeded by Marquess Ai of Han
