= Marquess Ai of Han =

Ruler of the State of Han from 376 BC to 374 BC

Marquess Ai of Han 韓哀侯

Marquess of Han
- Reign: 376–374 BC
- Predecessor: Marquess Wen
- Successor: Marquess Gong
- Died: 374 BC
Names
- Ancestral name: Jī (姬); Lineage name: Hán (韓); Given name: Unknown
Posthumous name
- Marquess Ai (哀侯)
- House: Ji
- Dynasty: Han
- Father: Marquess Wen

Marquess Ai of Han (Chinese: 韓哀侯; pinyin: Hán Āi Hóu; died 374 BC), personal name unknown, was marquess of the Han state from 376 BC until his death in 374 BC. He was the son of his predecessor, Marquess Wen.

In 376 BC, Han, Wei, and Zhao deposed Duke Jing of Jin. They then divided his land, marking the collapse of the Jin state.

The following year, after two unsuccessful invasions, Han annexed the Zheng state. It then moved the capital to Xinzheng (in present-day Henan). At this time, its territory contains south-eastern part of Shanxi and central part of Henan.

According to Zizhi Tongjian, while Marquess Ai appointed Han Xialei (韓俠累) to be prime minister, he had closer relations with Yan Sui (嚴遂). They were archenemies of each other. In 374 BC, Yan Sui plotted to assassinate Han Xialei at the court. Han Xialei sought help from Marquess Ai, who then hugged him. As a result, both were killed by the assassin. However, the Records of the Grand Historian tells a different story: Marquess Ai was murdered by Han Xialei and Yan Sui, and it was not an accident.

The Han throne then passed to Marquess Gong, son of Marquess Ai. Marquess Gong later moved the capital back to Yangzhai.

Chinese royalty
Preceded by Marquess Wen of Han	Marquess of Han; 376 BC – 374 BC	Succeeded by Marquess Gong of Han
