= Mount Wangwu =

Taoist mountain in Henan, China

Coordinates: 35°12′00″N 112°20′24″E

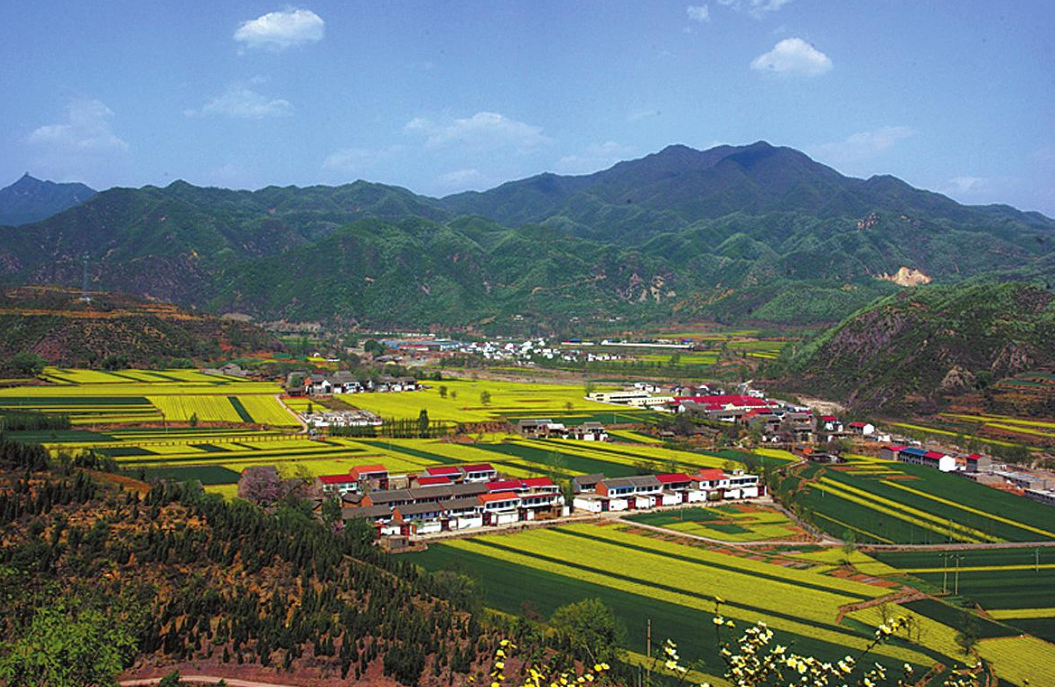
Mount Wangwu

Mount Wangwu (Chinese: 王屋山; pinyin: Wángwū Shān) is a mountain situated about 45 kilometres (28 mi) north west of Jiyuan City in China's Henan province. Located in the Wangwushan-Yuntaishan National Park, Mount Wangwu is a famous Taoist site that includes the "Celestial Grotto of the Small Pristine Void" (小有清虚洞天), one of the Ten Grotto-heavens of Taoism.

According to legend, the Yellow Emperor used an altar on top of the mountain to offer sacrifices to Heaven or Tian (祭天) where he received the Book of Nine Elixirs (九丹經), one of the earliest Chinese alchemical texts.

== See also ==
- One of the two mountains mentioned in the ancient Chinese myth "The Foolish Old Man Removes the Mountains" (Chinese: 愚公移山), the other is Taihang Mountain.
