= Han (Warring States) =

Central Chinese state from 403 to 230 BC

Han 韓
- 403 BC–230 BC
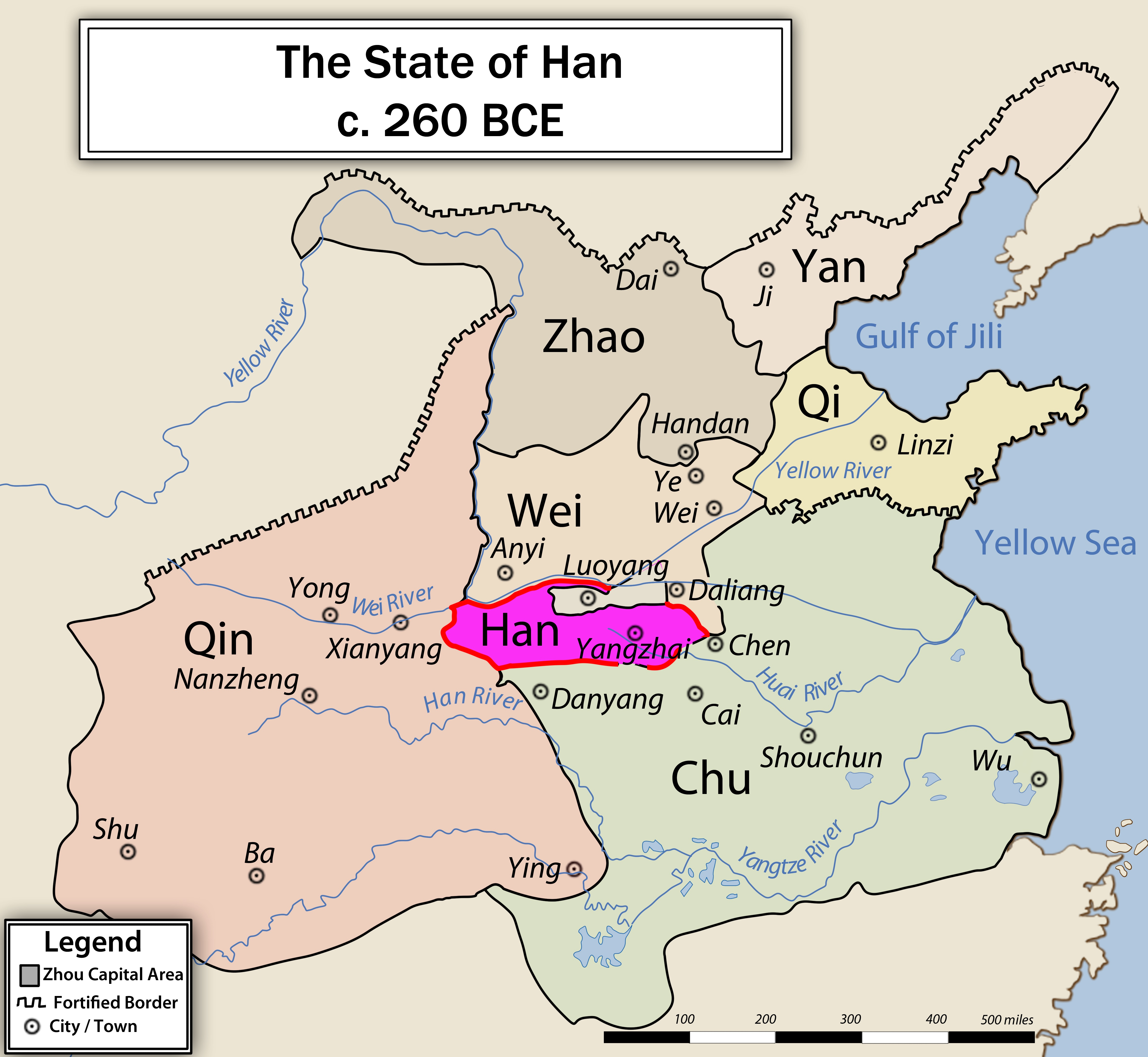
- Status: March → Kingdom
- Capital: Yangzhai (before 375 BC); Xinzheng (after 375 BC)
- Religion: Chinese folk religion ancestor worship
- Government: Monarchy
- Marquess → King
- Chancellor
- Historical era: Warring States period
  - Partition of Jin: 403 BC
  - Conquered by Qin: 230 BC
- Currency: spade money other ancient Chinese coinage
Preceded by	Succeeded by
Jin (Chinese state)	Qin dynasty

Han
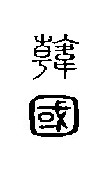
- "State of Han" in small seal script (220 BC)
- Traditional Chinese: 韓國
- Simplified Chinese: 韩国
Transcriptions
Standard Mandarin
- Hanyu Pinyin: Hánguó
- Gwoyeu Romatzyh: Harn-gwo
- Wade–Giles: Han-kuo
- IPA: [xǎnkwǒ]
Yue: Cantonese
- Yale Romanization: Hòhn Gwok
- Jyutping: Hon⁴ Gwok³
Southern Min
- Tâi-lô: Hân-kok
Old Chinese
- Baxter–Sagart (2014): *[g]ˤar [C.q]ʷˤək

Han was an ancient Chinese state during the Warring States period. Scholars frequently render the name as Hann to clearly distinguish it from China's later Han dynasty. It was located in central China (modern-day Shanxi and Henan) in a region south and east of Luoyang, the capital of the Eastern Zhou. It was ruled by aristocrats of the Ji (姬) family ancestral temple who rose to power as a ministerial family in the state of Jin, and whose power eventually eclipsed that of the Jin ruling house. The partition of Jin which resulted in the states of Han, Wei, and Zhao, marked the beginning of the Warring States period.

The state of Han was small and located in a mountainous and unprofitable region. Its territory directly blocked the passage of the state of Qin into the North China Plain. Although Han had attempted to reform its governance (notably under Chancellor Shen Buhai who improved state administration and strengthened its military ability) these reforms were not enough to defend itself and it was the first of the seven warring states to be conquered by Qin in 230 BC.

A Qin invasion of Han's Shangdang Commandery in 260 BC and the region's subsequent surrender to Zhao resulted in the Battle of Changping, claimed to be the bloodiest battle of the Warring States period where up to 400,000 soldiers died.

== History ==
=== Founding ===
According to chapter 45 of the Records of the Grand Historian, the royal family of Han was a cadet branch of the royal family of the state of Jin. The founder of the Han clan Wuzi of Han was the uncle of Duke Wu of Jin.

Members of the family became ministers in the powerful state of Jin and were granted Hanyuan (modern Hancheng in Shaanxi).

=== Spring and Autumn period ===
During the Spring and Autumn period, members of the Han family slowly gained more and more influence and power within Jin. In 453 BC, Jing of Han, along with Wen of Wei and Lie of Zhao partitioned Jin among themselves. In Chinese history, this Partition of Jin is the event which marks the end of the Spring and Autumn period and the beginning of the Warring States. Subsequently, Han was an independent polity. King Weilie eventually recognized the new states in 403 BC and elevated the rulers to 侯 (hou, "marquess").

=== Warring States Period ===
In 375 Han defeated the neighboring state of Zheng (founded in 806 by the Zhou dynasty). Han conquered and annexed Zheng, thus expanding its territory. Han also moved its capital there, and assimilated Zheng's heritage. This included that of the young politician Shen Buhai (400-337).

Han's highest point occurred under the rule of Marquess Xi. Xi appointed Shen Buhai as his chancellor and implemented his Legalist policies. These reforms improved state administration and strengthened its military capability. Under King Xuanhui (r. 332–312 BC), Han declared itself an independent kingdom.

However, Han was disadvantaged in the competition of the Warring States period because Jin's partition had left it surrounded on all sides by strong states: Chu to the south, Qi to the east, Qin to the west, and Wei to the north. Han was then the smallest of the seven states and was without any easy way to further expand its own territory and resources, It was bullied militarily by its more powerful neighbors.

=== Defeat ===
During its steady decline, Han eventually lost the power to defend its territory and had to request military assistance from other states. The contest between Wei and Qi over control of Han resulted in the Battle of Maling, which established Qi as the pre-eminent state in the east. In 260 BC, Qin's invasion of Han led to Zhao intervention and the Battle of Changping.

During the late years of the era, in an attempt to drain Qin's resources in an expensive public works project, the state of Han sent the civil engineer Zheng Guo to Qin to persuade them to build a canal. The scheme, while expensive, backfired spectacularly when it was eventually completed: the irrigation abilities of the new Zhengguo Canal far outweighed its cost and gave Qin the agricultural and economic means to dominate the other six states. Han was the first to fall, in 230 BC.

In 226 BC, former nobility of the Han launched a failed rebellion in former capital Xinzheng, and King An, the last king of Han, was put to death the same year.

Han Xin was made a "Prince" or "King of Han" (韓王) by Liu Bang after the establishment of the Han dynasty (漢朝). He was removed to Taiyuan Commandery and the territory of the kingdom of Dai, where he defected to the Xiongnu and led raids against the Han Dynasty until his death.

== Culture and society ==
Before the state of Qin unified China in 221 BC, each region had their own unique customs and culture, although they were all dominated by an upper class that shared a largely common culture. In the Yu Gong (Tribute of Yu), a section of the Book of Documents which was most likely composed in the 4th century BC, the author describes a China that is divided into nine regions, each with its own distinctive peoples and products. The core theme of this section is that these nine regions are unified into one state by the travels of the eponymous sage-emperor, Yu the Great, and by sending each region's unique goods to the capital as tribute. Other texts also discussed these regional variations in culture and physical environments.

One of these texts was Wuzi (The Book of Master Wu) which was a Warring States military treatise written in response to a query by Marquis Wu of Wei on how to cope with the other states. Wu Qi, the author of the work, declared that the government and nature of the people were linked to the physical environment and territory they live in. Of Han, he said:

The two states of Han and Zhao train their troops rigorously but have difficulty in applying their skills to the battlefield.

— Wuzi, Master Wu

Han and Zhao are states of the Central Plain. Theirs are a gentle people, weary from war and experienced in arms, but have little regard for their generals. The soldiers' salaries are meager and their officers have no strong commitment to their countries. Although their troops are experienced, they cannot be expected to fight to the death. To defeat them, we must concentrate large numbers of troops in our attacks to present them with certain peril. When they counterattack, we must be prepared to defend our positions vigorously and make them pay dearly. When they retreat, we must pursue and give them no rest. This will grind them down.

— Wuzi, Master Wu

== In the Han Feizi ==
Chapter 19 of the Han Feizi recalls Qin's conquest of Ye from the Zhao, dated to 236bc. The chapter says: "To-day, Han, being a small state, is relying upon big powers. Her sovereign, paying little attention to the law, takes every word from Qin. The above-mentioned small states, having relied upon Wey, Ch`i, Ching, and Wu for support, went to ruin one after another. Thus reliance on others is not sufficient to extend the native soil." Seemingly written from the context of the late Han state, the chapter might have preceded its fall in 230bc, or either Zhao and Wei if the latter had only yet ceded territory.

== Rulers ==
Title	Name	Reign	Alternative Title(s)
Pre-State sovereigns
Wuzi 韓武子	Hán Wàn 韓萬		
Qiubo 韓賕伯	unknown		
Dingbo 韓定伯	Hán Jiǎn 韓簡		
Ziyu 韓子輿	Hán Yú 韓輿		
Xianzi 韓獻子	Hán Jué 韓厥		
Xuanzi 韓宣子	Hán Qǐ 韓起		
Zhenzi 韓貞子	Hán Xū 韓須		
Jianzi 韓簡子	Hán Bùxìn 韓不信		
Zhuangzi 韓莊子	Hán Gēng 韓庚		
Kangzi 韓康子	Hán Hǔ 韓虎		
Wuzi 韓武子	Hán Qǐzhāng 韓啓章	424 BC – 409 BC	
State sovereigns
Marquess Jing 韓景侯	Hán Qián 韓虔	408 BC – 400 BC	
Marquess Lie 韓烈侯	Hán Qǔ 韓取	399 BC – 387 BC	Marquess Wu (韓武侯)
Marquess Wen 韓文侯	unknown	386 BC – 377 BC	
Marquess Ai 韓哀侯	unknown	376 BC – 374 BC	
Marquess Gong 韓共侯	Hán Ruòshān 韓若山	374 BC – 363 BC	Marquess Zhuang (韓莊侯); Marquess Yi (韓懿侯)
Marquess Xi 韓厘侯	Hán Wǔ 韓武	362 BC – 333 BC	Marquess Zhao (韓昭侯)
King Xuanhui 韓宣惠王	unknown	332 BC – 312 BC	King Xuan (韓宣王); Marquess Wei (韓威侯), before 323 BC
King Xiang 韓襄王	Hán Cāng 韓倉	311 BC – 296 BC	King Xiang'ai (韓襄哀王); King Daoxiang (韓悼襄王)
King Xi 韓釐王	Hán Jiù 韓咎	295 BC – 273 BC	
King Huanhui 韓桓惠王	unknown	272 BC – 239 BC	
King An 韓王安	Hán Ān 韓安	238 BC – 230 BC	

== Rulers family tree ==
Han state

Mu of Jin 晉穆侯; Marquis of Jin; 812–785 BC
Wen of Jin 晉文侯; Marquis of Jin; 780–746 BC	Huan Shu of Quwo 曲沃桓叔; 745–731 BC
Zhao of Jin 晉昭侯; Marquis of Jin; 745–739 BC	Hán Wàn 韓萬; Wuzi of Han 韓武子; Ruler of Han	Zhuang Bo of Quwo 曲沃莊伯; 731–716 BCE
Qiubo of Han 韓賕伯; Ruler of Han
Hán Jiǎn 韓簡; Dingbo 韓定伯; Ruler of Han
Hán Yú 韓輿; Ziyu 子輿; Ruler of Han
Hán Jué 韓厥; Xianzi of Han 韓獻子; Ruler of Han
Hán Qǐ 韓起; Xuanzi of Han 韓宣子; Ruler of Han
Hán Xū 韓須; Zhenzi of Han 韓貞子; Ruler of Han
Hán Bùxìn 韓不信; Jianzi of Han 韓簡子; Ruler of Han
Hán Gēng 韓庚; Zhuangzi 韓莊子; Ruler of Han
Hán Hǔ 韓虎; Kangzi of Han 韓康子; Ruler of Han
Hán Qǐzhāng 韓啓章; Wuzi of Han 韓武子; Ruler of Han; 424–409 BC
Hán Qián 韓虔; Jing of Han 韓景侯; Marquess of Han; 408–400BC
Hán Qǔ 韓取; Lie (Wu) of Han; Marquess of Han; 399–387 BC
Wen of Han; Marquess of Han; 386–377 BC
Ai of Han 韓哀侯; Marquess of Han; 376–374 BC
Hán Ruòshān 韓若山; Gong of Han 韓共侯; Marquess of Han; 374–363 BC
Hán Wǔ 韓武; Xi of Han 韓釐侯; Marquess of Han; 362 BC–333 BC
Xuanhui of Han 韓宣惠王; King of Han; 332–312 BC
Hán Cāng 韓倉; Xiang of Han 韓襄王; King of Han; 311–296 BC
Hán Jiù 韓咎; Xi of Han 韓釐王; King of Han; 295–273 BC	Jǐ shī 蟣蝨
Huanhui of Han 韓桓惠王; King of Han; 272–239 BC	Xin of Han; King of Han; 205–196 BC
Hán Ān 韓安; An of Han 韓王安; King of Han ?–238–230–226 BC

== Famous people ==
- Han Fei, a Legalist philosopher
- Zhang Liang, a major figure in the early Han dynasty
- Zheng Guo, the hydraulic engineer who designed the Zhengguo Canal for Qin

== Han in astronomy ==
Han is represented by the star 35 Capricorni in the "Twelve States" asterism, part of the "Girl" lunar mansion in the "Black Turtle" symbol. Han is also represented by the star Zeta Ophiuchi in the "Right Wall" asterism, part of the "Heavenly Market" enclosure.
