= King Gong of Chu =

King Gong of Chu 楚共王

King of Chu
- Reign: 590–560 BC
- Predecessor: King Zhuang
- Successor: King Kang
- Born: 600 BC
- Died: 560 BC
- Spouse: Qin Ying (秦嬴); Ba Ji (巴姬)
- Issue: King Kang; King Ling; Xiong Bi; Xiong Heigong (熊黑肱); King Ping
Names
- Ancestral name: Mǐ (羋); Lineage name: Xióng (熊); Given name: Shěn (審)
Posthumous name
- King Gong (共王 or 恭王 or 龔王)
- House: Mi
- Dynasty: Chu
- Father: King Zhuang

King Gong of Chu (Chinese: 楚共王; pinyin: Chǔ Gòng Wáng), personal name Xiong Shen, was king of the Chu state from 590 BC to 560 BC.

King Gong succeeded his father, King Zhuang, who was one of the Five Hegemons of the Spring and Autumn period. In 575 BC, Chu was defeated by its archrival Jin in the Battle of Yanling and Chu's power declined. He ruled for 31 years and was succeeded by his eldest son, King Kang. Three of King Gong's younger sons also ascended the throne, all by treacherous means.

== Battle of Yanling ==
When King Gong ascended the throne in 590 BC Chu was the strongest power in China. In 597 BC his father King Zhuang defeated Chu's archrival Jin in the Battle of Bi and was recognized as the Hegemon by other states. However, King Gong's reign was marked by Chu's decisive defeat by the resurgent Jin in the 575 BC Battle of Yanling.

The battle was triggered by a series of minor events. In 577 BC, the Jin vassal state Zheng attacked the Chu vassal state Xu (許). The next year Chu attacked Zheng in revenge, and forced Zheng to switch its loyalty to Chu. Zheng then attacked Song, another Jin vassal state. In 575 BC, Duke Li of Jin raised an army to attack Zheng, while King Gong led the Chu army north to defend his new ally.

The two forces met at Yanling, and Jin defeated Chu by attacking its weaker flanks manned by the poorly trained Zheng and Dongyi soldiers. During the battle King Gong was shot in the eye by an arrow. Despite his wound, at the end of the day King Gong summoned the chief military commander Zifan to discuss the battle plan for the next day, but caught Zifan drunk. King Gong decided to retreat and Zifan later committed suicide.

== Conflicts with Wu ==

While Chu was preoccupied with its rivalry with Jin, the formerly insignificant state of Wu began to rise to its east. In 598 BC, during King Zhuang's reign, Chu minister Wuchen (Duke of Shen) defected to Jin after a personal dispute with general Zifan. In 584 BC Wuchen went on a mission to Wu on behalf of Jin to establish an alliance between the two states. He brought along 100 charioteers who taught the Wu army to use chariots, and successfully incited Wu to revolt against Chu. The Wu king Shoumeng invaded Chu, annexed the Chu city of Zhoulai, and took over many tribes that had been loyal to Chu.

In 570 BC Chu general Zichong attacked Wu, reaching Mount Heng (in present-day Dangtu County) in Wu territory. However, Wu counterattacked and took the important Chu city of Jia. Zichong was blamed for the loss and died from an illness. For the ensuing seven decades Chu would be consumed by a series of at least ten wars or battles with Wu, culminating in the 506 BC Battle of Boju, when the Wu army would capture and destroy the Chu capital Ying.

== Posthumous title ==
In 560 BC, when King Gong was dying from illness, he summoned his ministers and requested to be given the pejorative posthumous title of Ling (靈) or Li (厲), expressing shame for losing the Battle of Yanling and causing disgrace to the nation. The ministers agreed at his insistence, but after his death they instead gave him the title Gong, meaning "humbly reverent". The pejorative title King Ling was later given to King Gong's second son Xiong Wei, who would in 541 BC murder his nephew Jia'ao and usurp the throne.

== Succession ==
King Gong had at least five sons, four of whom became king. When King Gong died in 560 BC, he was succeeded by his eldest son King Kang of Chu, who died in 545 BC after 15 years of reign and was succeeded by his son Xiong Yuan (posthumous title Jia'ao). Four years later King Gong's second son Prince Wei murdered Jia'ao and his two sons when he was ill, and usurped the throne. Prince Wei was later given the pejorative posthumous title King Ling of Chu.

In 529 BC when King Ling was on an expedition against the State of Xu, his three younger brothers staged a coup d'etat and killed his son Crown Prince Lu. Prince Bi, the third brother, ascended the throne (posthumous title Zi'ao), and the fourth brother Prince Zixi became the prime minister. When news of the coup reached King Ling's troops they abandoned him en masse, and in desperation King Ling killed himself.

However, Prince Qiji, the fifth brother, concealed the truth about King Ling's death from Zi'ao and Zixi. Instead, he pretended to be defeated by King Ling and said the king would soon return to the capital. Zi'ao and Zixi were so fearful that they both committed suicide; Zi'ao had been king for less than twenty days. Prince Qiji then ascended the throne and would come to be known as King Ping of Chu.

=== Family tree ===
King Gong (r. 590–560 BC)
King Kang (r. 559–545 BC)	King Ling (r. 540–529 BC)	Zi'ao (r. 529 BC)	Zixi	King Ping (r. 528–516 BC)
Jia'ao (r. 544–541 BC)	Crown Prince Lu	King Zhao (r. 515–489 BC)

King Gong of Chu House of Mi Born: 600 BC Died: 560 BC
Regnal titles
Preceded by King Zhuang of Chu	King of Chu; 590–560 BC	Succeeded by King Kang of Chu
