= Zhongli (state) =

Ancient Chinese state

Zhongli 童麗
- 8th century BC–6th century BC
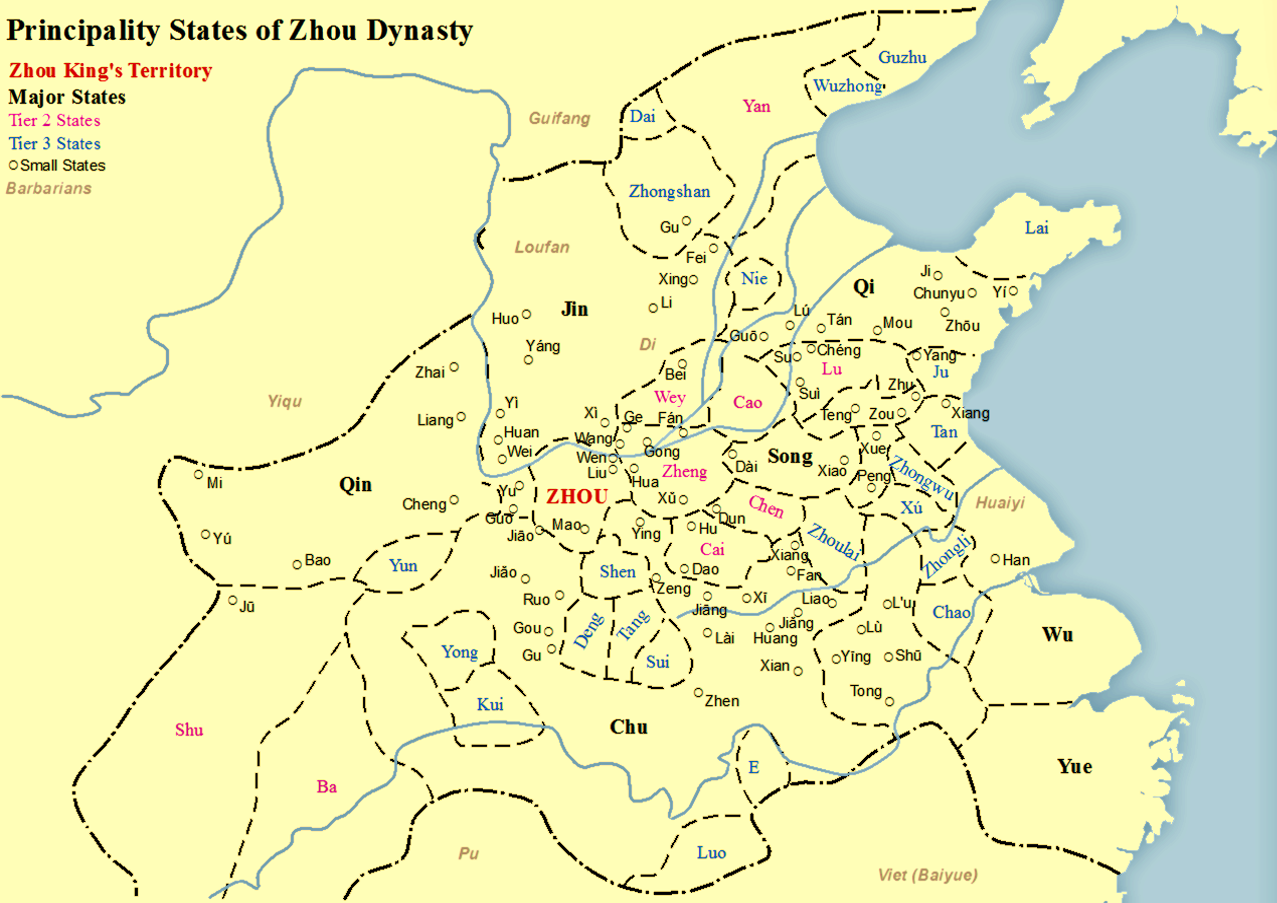
- Map of China during the Spring and Autumn period; Zhongli is located in the southeast
- Status: Vassal state of Chu and Wu (possibly in the 6th century BC)
- Capital: Zhongli
- Common languages: Old Chinese (lingua franca), local languages
- Religion: Chinese folk religion
- Government: Monarchy
- Duke
  - fl. 650–600 BC: Bai
  - fl. 600 BC: Kang
  - 6th century BC: Yu
- Historical era: Spring and Autumn period
  - Established: 8th century BC
  - Conquered by Chu: 6th century BC
Preceded by	Succeeded by
Xu (state)	Chu (state); Wu (state)
- Today part of: China

Zhongli (Chinese: 鍾離, originally written as 童麗) was an ancient Chinese state in the Huai River valley during the Spring and Autumn period. Its core area was located in the modern-day Fengyang County. At its peak, Zhongli was powerful enough to fight off various other states, and served as an important cultural, political, and economic centre. The state was conquered by its expansionist and militant neighbor Chu during the 6th century BC, but its former capital city remained regionally important for several subsequent centuries.

== History ==
Map of modern China showing the approximate location of Zhongli

The origins of Zhongli are unclear, but its inhabitants probably belonged to the Huaiyi people that traditionally lived in the Huai River valley. The state was ruled by a branch of the Ying (嬴) clan that also controlled the states of Xu, Ju, and Tan. According to legends recorded by the Records of the Grand Historian and other sources, the clan was related to the royal family of Qin, a polity located far in the west. Three Song dynasty books on geography and history stated that Zhongli was a "separated fiefdom" of Xu. Zhongli's rulers traced their origin to a man named "Ao Jue Shi", grandfather of Lord Bai.

The state was probably founded in the 8th century BC during the early Spring and Autumn period, and quickly became a regional power. It regularly clashed with the states of Chu to the west, and Xu, Qi, and Lu to the north. Lord Bai is the earliest confirmed ruler of Zhongli. He probably lived in the second half of the 7th century BC, fought against the state of Xu, and possibly died in battle. He was succeeded by his son Kang. By the reign of Yu, Zhongli was engulfed in a war with Chu and its people were possibly forced to migrate. In 576 BC, Zhongli served as the location for an important interstate meeting. Led by Duke Cheng of Lu, ministers and/or representatives from the states of Jin, Qi, Song, Wei, Zheng, and Zhu, negotiated with representatives of the state of Wu for the first time. It is possible that it was already a vassal state of Wu at this point. Like many other settlements and polities in the Huai River valley, Zhongli became involved in the wars between Chu and Wu, as these two powerful states battled for supremacy over the Yangtze and Huai River valleys.

Zhongli was conquered by Chu at some point during the 6th century BC, and perhaps became its vassal in turn. The city was fortified by Chu's Director of Remonstrance in 538 BC, but conquered by King Liao of Wu twenty years later. This marked the definite end of Zhongli's statehood. When Wu was destroyed by Yue, Zhongli was returned to Chu and remained part of its territory until the Warring States period's end. By the time of Qin dynasty, the characters for Zhongli's name had changed to "鍾離". The city became a county seat during the Han dynasty, and was the site of a battle between Northern Wei and the Liang dynasty in 507. Zhongli remained inhabited until the reign of Emperor Gaozu of Tang (566–635). It was then abandoned, and the county seat of Zhongli was transferred to Haozhou.

== Archeology and culture ==
As little was reported about Zhongli in literary sources, knowledge about the state mostly stems from excavations of its ruined capital and the nearby tombs of its rulers. Zhongli was part of the Huai River culture whose burial traditions probably descended from the Neolithic Shuangdun culture. In turn, the Huai River culture was part of the Wu-Yue cultural sphere which covered much of southeastern China.

=== Settlement ===
The eponymous capital of Zhongli was probably located north of present-day Li'erzhuang village, Fengyang County. It was relatively small, 360 meters by 380 meters, and protected by a wall. According to historian Chen Shen, Zhongli's capital was typical of the widespread urbanization during the Eastern Zhou period. The royal cemetery was in the wider vicinity, though clearly separated from urban center of the state. This relation between city and burial sites was typical for the Spring and Autumn period. The city was an "important governmental, economic, cultural, and military center" for the Huai River valley, and maintained this role for over a thousand years after the fall of Zhongli state.

=== Tombs ===
The excavated tombs of Zhongli's royal family have led archaeologists to the conclusion that the state possessed a distinct material culture. This is particularly the case for the tomb at Shuangdun village, Bengbu. Identified as the burial site of Lord Bai of Zhongli, this tomb is unique in its design, though showed influences from the Chu culture to the south. It consisted of a cross-formed earthen shaft pit tomb that was located in a larger, circular funeral structure underneath a mound.

Two more Zhongli tombs have been excavated, namely the one for Lord Kang at Bianzhuang, Fengyang, and Lord Yu at Jiulidun, Shucheng, respectively. The tombs yielded numerous artifacts, and Bai's tomb in particular had rich grave goods: These included bronze objects bells, container vessels, tripods, axes, halberds, swords, daggers, and arrowheads. Furthermore, much pottery, lacquered wooden objects, music stones, jade ornaments, and more than 2,000 clay figurines were excavated. Kang and Yu's tombs had similar grave goods.

== Rulers ==
The rulers of Zhongli assumed the titles of "jun" (君, lord), and "gōng" (公, duke).

Name	Period of reign (BC)	Relationships	Notes
Ao Jue Shi 敖厥士	Unknown	Earliest known ancestor of Zhongli's royal family	
Bai 柏	7th century, probably 650–600	Grandson of Ao	c. 40 at death; fought against Xu; possibly killed in battle
Kang 康	c. 7th century	Son of Duke Bai, great-grandson of Ao	
Yu 鱼	c. 6th century	great-great-grandson of Ao	waged war against Chu
