= King Kang of Chu =

King of Chu from 559 to 545 BC

King Kang of Chu 楚康王

King of Chu
- Reign: 559–545 BC
- Predecessor: King Gong
- Successor: Xiong Yuan
- Died: 545 BC
- Issue: Xiong Yuan
Names
- Ancestral name: Mǐ (羋); Lineage name: Xióng (熊); Given name: Zhāo (昭)
Posthumous name
- King Kang (康王)
- House: Mi
- Dynasty: Chu
- Father: King Gong

King Kang of Chu (Chinese: 楚康王; pinyin: Chǔ Kāng Wáng), personal name Xiong Zhao, was from 559 BC to 545 BC the king of the Chu state. He succeeded his father, King Gong, to the Chu throne.

King Kang's reign was marked by constant wars with the Jin state, Chu's traditional enemy, and the Wu state, its new enemy.

King Kang ruled for 15 years and was succeeded by his son, Xiong Yuan, who would be murdered by King Kang's younger brother, King Ling, four years later.

== Battle of Yongpu ==

When King Kang's father King Gong died in 560 BC, Chu's enemy Wu seized the opportunity to invade Chu. Chief military commander Zigeng (子庚) and general Yang Youji (养由基) led the Chu army to repel the invaders. After the initial fight Zigeng feigned defeat. The Wu army chased the retreating Chu army to Yongpu (庸浦, in present-day Wuwei County, Anhui Province), where they fell into an ambush and were soundly defeated. Prince Dang, the commander of the Wu army, was captured.

== Battle of Zhanban ==
In 557 BC, just three years after the Battle of Yongpu, Chu fought the last major battle with its traditional enemy Jin at Zhanban (湛阪, in present-day Pingdingshan, Henan Province). Chu was defeated and lost all of its territory north of Fangcheng, the Great Wall of Chu. The Battle of Zhanban marked the end of the eight-decade-long Jin-Chu rivalry, as a weakened Chu would be consumed by numerous wars with its new enemy Wu, culminating in the 506 BC Battle of Boju, when the Wu army would capture and destroy the Chu capital Ying. Meanwhile, Jin was increasingly riven by internal strife that would ultimately lead to its partition into the new states of Han, Zhao, and Wei.

== Conquest of Shujiu ==
In 549 BC Duke Ping of Jin attacked the Chu ally Qi. To help Qi, Chu attacked the Jin ally Zheng. King Zhufan of Wu seized the opportunity and induced the Chu vassal state Shujiu (舒鸠, in present-day Shucheng County, Anhui Province) to switch its allegiance to Wu. The next year, Chu prime minister Qu Jian (屈建, also known as Zimu) and general Zijiang (子彊) led an army to punish Shujiu, again ambushing and routing the Wu army. Chu then annexed Shujiu.

== Battle of Chaocheng ==
In 548 BC, soon after Wu's defeat at Shujiu, King Zhufan personally led an army to again invade Chu, attacking the Chu city Chaocheng (巢城). Greatly outnumbered by the Wu army, Chu general Niu Chen (牛臣) pretended to give up Chaocheng and left the city gate wide open. When the unsuspecting Zhufan entered the city, Niu Chen shot and killed him with an arrow. The Wu army fell into chaos and was again defeated. Zhufan's brother Yuji succeeded him as king of Wu.

== Succession ==
King Kang was the eldest of King Gong's five sons, four of whom would ascend the throne. When King Kang died in 545 BC after 15 years of reign he was succeeded by his son Xiong Yuan (posthumous title Jia'ao) and King Kang's younger brother Prince Wei served as the prime minister. Four years later, Prince Wei murdered Jia'ao and his two sons when he was ill, and usurped the throne. Prince Wei was later given the pejorative posthumous title King Ling of Chu.

In 529 BC when King Ling was on an expedition against the State of Xu, his three younger brothers staged a coup d'etat and killed his son Crown Prince Lu. Xiong Bi, the third brother, ascended the throne (posthumous title Zi'ao), and the fourth brother Prince Zixi became the prime minister. When news of the coup reached King Ling's troops they abandoned him en masse, and in desperation King Ling killed himself.

However, Xiong Qiji, the fifth brother, concealed the truth about King Ling's death from Zi'ao and Zixi. Instead, he pretended to be defeated by King Ling and said the king would soon return to the capital. Zi'ao and Zixi were so fearful that they both committed suicide; Zi'ao had been king for less than twenty days. Prince Qiji then ascended the throne and would come to be known as King Ping of Chu.

=== Family tree ===
King Gong (r. 590–560 BC)
King Kang (r. 559–545 BC)	King Ling (r. 540–529 BC)	Zi'ao (r. 529 BC)	Zixi	King Ping (r. 528–516 BC)
Jia'ao (r. 544–541 BC)	Crown Prince Lu	King Zhao (r. 515–489 BC)

King Kang of Chu House of Mi Died: 545 BC
Regnal titles
Preceded by King Gong of Chu	King of Chu; 559–545 BC	Succeeded by Jia'ao
