= Liuqiu =

Liuqiu or Lewchew is a Chinese place-name variously denoting:

- Liuqiu (medieval), a realm variously identified with the main island of Taiwan, the Penghu Islands (Taiwan), and the Ryukyu Islands (Japan)
- Ryukyu Islands, an archipelago southwest of the Japanese Home Islands (politically part of Japan)
- Liuqiu Island or Little Liuqiu, an island southwest of the main island of Taiwan (politically part of Taiwan)

== See also ==
- Ryukyu Kingdom, kingdom in the Ryukyu Islands from 1429 to 1879
