= Peng Zu =

Legendary long-lived figure in China

- 彭祖
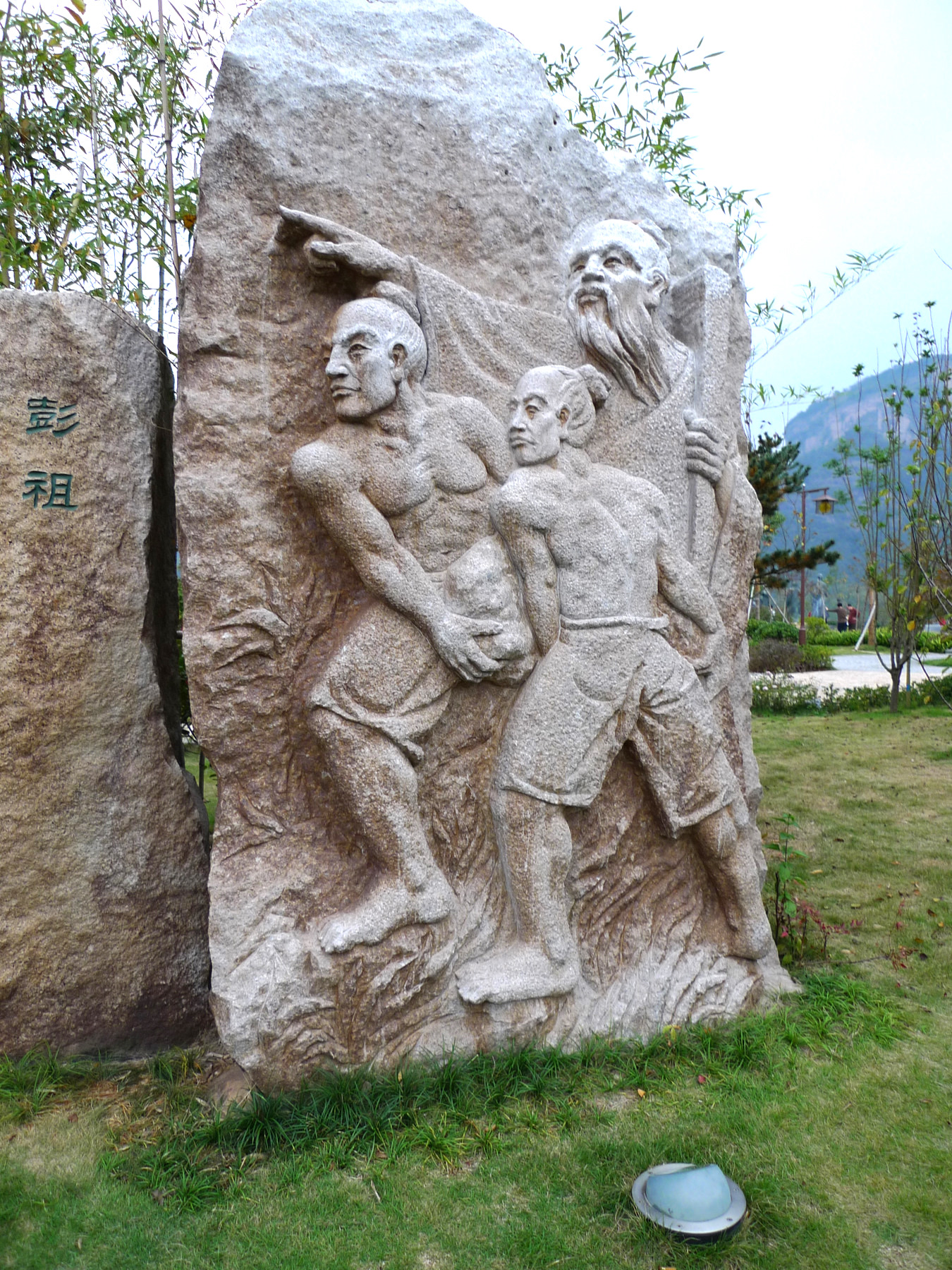
- Sculpture of Peng Zu at Tea Theme Park in Mount Wuyi
- Known for: Extraordinarily long life

Peng Zu or Pengzu (彭祖, lit. 'Drumming Ancestor' or 'Peng Ancestor') is a legendary long-lived figure in China. He supposedly lived 840 years through the legendary Xia dynasty and historical Shang dynasty, all the way to the early Zhou dynasty. Some legends say that one year was 60 days in ancient China; that made him more than 130 years old. Others say he was 400 years old. Another says he was accidentally left off of the death list in heaven.

Peng Zu was regarded as a saint in Taoism. The pursuit of elixir of life by practitioners of Taoism was highly influenced by Peng Zu. He is well known in Chinese culture as a symbol for longevity, nutrition treatments, and sex therapy treatments. Legend maintains he married more than 100 wives and fathered hundreds of children, as late as in his 450th year.

According to the Spring and Autumn period's Guoyu (Discourses of the States), the Han dynasty's Shiben (Genealogy), and the Tang dynasty's Kuodi Zhi (Record of Geography), Peng Zu was the founder of Dapeng and made marquis by the kings of the Shang dynasty.

He was mentioned in the Analects, where Confucius claims that he is like Peng Zu because he was a transmitter of the knowledge passed on by the ancients rather than a creator of knowledge.

== Description ==
One of his life extending techniques was vitality absorb skill, which purportedly extracts female energy into the male body (harvesting from Yin to supplement Yang) throughout intimacy. He also consumed medical cuisine on a daily basis to sustain life.

He ate naturally and used herbs to enrich his nutrition. He was known for cooking excellent ginseng chicken soup. Chinese people believe that his long life, good health, and sexual energy were attributed to the food he ate. His life style emphasized meditation. He was viewed as one of the pioneers of Qigong.

The place where he lived and died was called Peng Shan (彭山, "Peng Mountain"), from which the district was named (in Sichuan Province, China). His shrine, tomb, and statue are preserved in Pengshan District.

There is a Peng Zu Festival every year for people to pay respects to his legacy and pray for healthier, happier, and longer lives. His pictures hang in houses all over China and are popular birthday gifts for senior citizens.

== Temple ==
In the Luyang Mountains of Anhui Province, there is a site called Peng Zu Xianshi (the immortal room of Peng Zu), where it is believed Peng Zu ascended to immortality. According to legend, prayers for favorable weather offered at his temple were swiftly answered. It is also said that two tigers once roamed near the temple, one on each side. By the time of the Jin Dynasty, the temple had fallen into disuse, but traces of the tigers' presence were still evident in the surrounding area.

== See also ==
- Peng Kingdom
- Peng (surname), supposedly derived from a descendant of Pengzu
- Qian (surname), supposedly derived from a descendant of Pengzu

== Bibliography ==
- Wu, Hung (1990). "The Art of Xuzhou: A Regional Approach" (PDF). Orientations. 21. Hong Kong: 40–59. Archived from the original (PDF) on 2013-08-29.
