= Tan (state) =

Tan 譚
- 1046 BCE–684 BCE
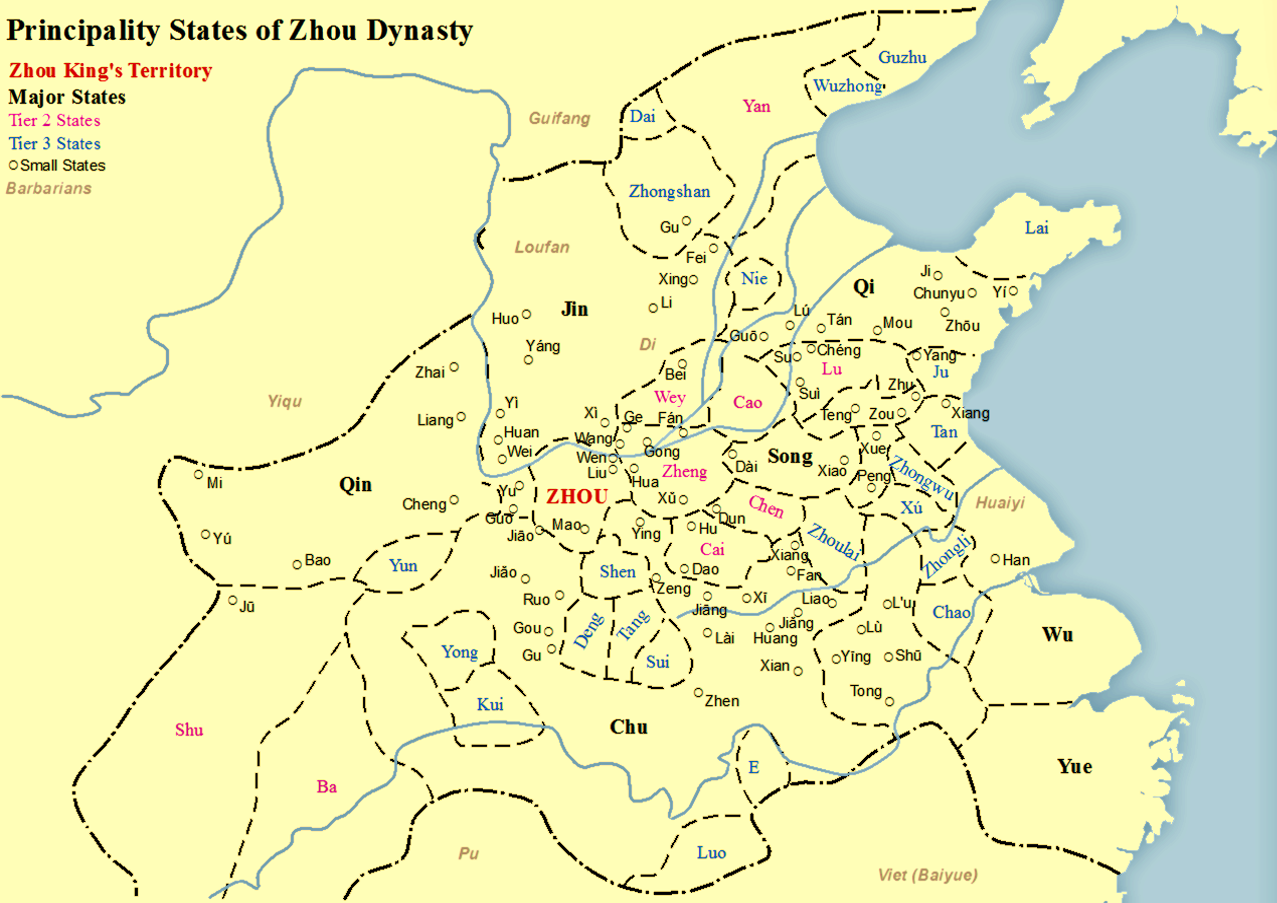
- Tan is represented as a city within the southern part of Qi
- Capital: Mingshui (明水)
- Common languages: Old Chinese
- Government: Viscounty
- History
  - Established: 1046 BCE
  - Disestablished: 684 BCE

Tan (Chinese: 譚; pinyin: Tán; Wade–Giles: Tan^{2}; 1046–684 BCE) was an ancient state located in present-day Shandong Province, China. It is the first state reported to be "extinguished" (Note: The term implies the destruction of its Ruling House, the abolition of its sacrifices, and the absorption of the people and territory by the prevailing Power.) during the Spring and Autumn period.

== Foundation ==
In 1046 BCE, (Note: The traditional date for the Battle of Muye was 1122 BCE.) Di Xin, the last king of the Shang dynasty, was defeated at the Battle of Muye by King Wu, founder of the Zhou dynasty. Following this victory, he founded a number of small subordinate vassal states (Note: It is estimated that there were some 170 vassal states established during the reign of the Zhou dynasty.) to be ruled by his brothers and generals. One of these was the State of Tan, which was located just east of present-day Jinan, the capital of the present-day Shandong Province. The Tan rulers, who were reputed to be descendants of Yu the Great (the legendary ancient king and founder of the Xia dynasty), were given the then-new heredity title of zijue (tzu-chueh – 子爵) or viscount.

== Demise ==
In February 684 BCE, when rulers of neighboring states went to congratulate Duke Huan of Qi, ruler of the neighboring State of Qi, on defeating the State of Lu and the State of Song, Xian Li, the ruler of Tan declined to go.

Later in October of that year, the ruler of Qi used this discourtesy as an excuse to attack Xian Li and his three brothers. After ten days, his siege was successful, and Xian Li fled with 200 members of the royal court to the State of Ju, where his son, Qi Yi (祁義), was the ruler. Qi Yi was the first to change his clan name to Tan in memory of their defeated state.

Today, Tancheng claims to be the ancient capital of this State of Tan. However, it has also been argued that it is actually the capital of a State of Tan established during the Tang dynasty. Others argue that the ancient capital is the present-day Mingshui Sub-district of the city of Zhangqiu in Shandong Province.

== Rulers ==
=== House of Si (姒) ===
Title	Name	Reign (BCE)	Relationship	Notes
Viscount Qiong 譚瓊子	Qiongguo 瓊國	1046-1039		Born in 1105 BCE, enfeoffed by King Wu of Zhou in 1046, with capital at Zhangqiu, died in 1039 BCE
Viscount Chuang 譚傳子	Chuanguang 傳光	1039-1005	First son of Viscount Qiong	Born in 1069 BCE, reigned for 34 years, died in 1005 BCE
Viscount Lai 譚來子	Laifu 來富	1005-973	First son of Viscount Chuang	Born in 1039 BCE, died in 973 BCE
Viscount You 譚有子	Youde 有德	973-947	Second son of Viscount Lai	Born in 1009 BCE, died in 947 BCE
Viscount Si 譚四子	Siyu 四餘	947-921	Second son of Viscount You	Born in 976 BCE, reigned for 26 years, died in 921 BCE
Viscount Ji 譚季子	Jisheng 季生	10th century	Only son of Viscount Si	Born in 954 BCE
Viscount Ping 譚平子	Pingnan 平南	9th century	Second son of Viscount Ji	Born in 934 BCE
Viscount Yuan 譚員子	Yuanyu 員餘	9th century	First son of Viscount Ping	Born in 910 BCE, biography does not reference him as a Viscount
Viscount Ri 譚日子	Rilong 日龍	9th century	First son of Viscount Yuan	Born in 885 BCE
Viscount Yue 譚月子	Yueke 月可	9th century	First son of Viscount Ri	Born in 859 BCE
Viscount Cao 譚草子	Caoli 草立	8th century	Second son of Viscount Yue	Born in 833 BCE, biography does not reference him as a Viscount
Viscount Mu 譚木子	Muyuan 木元	8th century	First son of Viscount Yue	Born in 805 BCE
Viscount Hua 譚花子	Huagui 花桂	8th century	Second son of Viscount Mu	Born in 783 BCE, died in 717 BCE, biography does not reference him as a Viscount
Viscount Kai 譚開子	Kailai 開來	8th century	First son of Viscount Hua	Born in 746 BCE, died in 693 BCE, biography does not reference him as a Viscount
Viscount Xian 譚賢子	Xianli 賢禮	7th century	Second son of Viscount Kai	Born in 715 BCE, he respected the king, resisted tyrants, and rectified wickedness. He did not pay respects to Duke Huan of Qi when the Duke ascended to the seat of Qi State (齊國), and as a result the Duke invaded Tan State (譚國) in 684 BCE. The Tan capital was besieged and then occupied for 3 years before being vassalized by the Duke. He changed his surname to Tan (譚) to honor their former state. Either Tan Xianli or his son Tan Qiyi are considered the Progenitor of the Tan surname.
Viscount Qi 譚祁子	Qiyi 祁義	7th century	First son of Viscount Xian	Born in 689 BCE. When he was 5, Duke Huan of Qi invaded his homeland. His family and over 200 other survivors fled to Ju State (莒國) for safety. He changed his surname to Tan (譚) to honor their former state. When he grew up, he followed his father's order and reported to King Xiang of Zhou in Luoyi (洛邑). The king found no fault in his report and granted him the viscount title of his forefathers. He stayed in Luoyi with his sons Tan Kejin and Tan Kezheng. Either Tan Qiyi or his father Tan Xianli are considered the Progenitor of the Tan surname. He and his descendants continued to rule Tan State (譚國) as a vassal of Qi State (齊國).

== See also ==
- Tancheng County
- Dongyi
- Ju (state)
- Lai (state)
- Dapeng (state)
- Xu (state)
- Gumie (state)
