= Ju (state) =

Ancient Chinese state

Ju 莒
- 1046 BC–431 BC
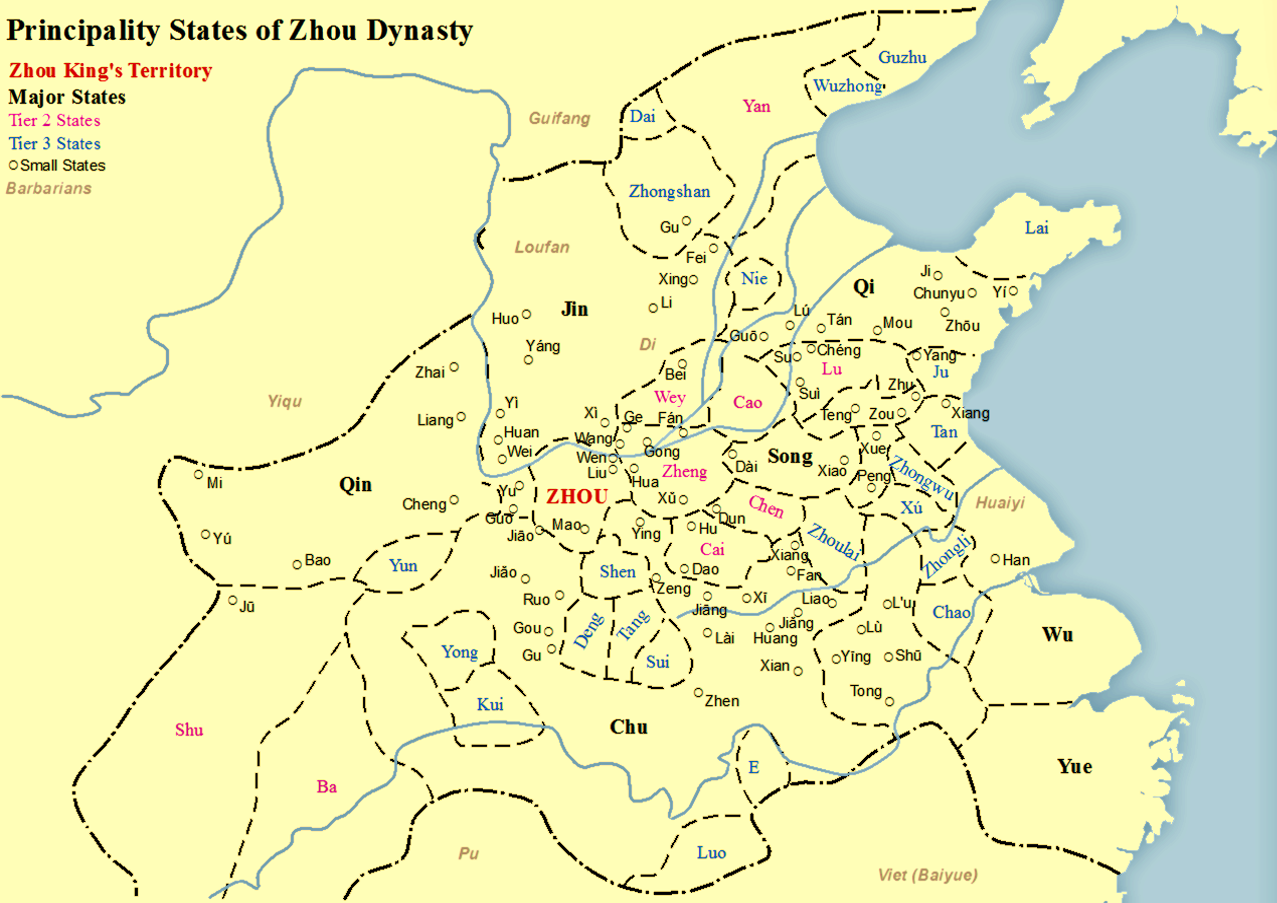
- Ju is a small state in the east
- Capital: Ju County
- Religion: Chinese folk religion
- Government: Monarchy
  - 1046BC–?: Ziyuqi
- Historical era: Western Zhou period Spring and Autumn period Warring States period
  - Established: 1046 BC
  - Conquered by Chu: 431 BC
- Today part of: China

Ju (Chinese: 莒; pinyin: Jǔ) was a Dongyi state in modern Shandong province during the Zhou dynasty (1046–256 BCE) of ancient China. The rulers of Ju bore the surname of Ji. According to the Shuowen Jiezi, "Ju" means taro or a wooden tool. It was weakened by wars with the states of Chu and Qi. Eventually the state was annexed by Qi, and the City of Ju became a major stronghold of Qi.

== See also ==
- Tan (state)
- Lai (state)
- Dapeng (state)
- Xu (state)
- Gumie
