= Zhoulai =

Chinese state during Spring and Autumn period

State of Zhoulai 州來
- Unknown–529 BC
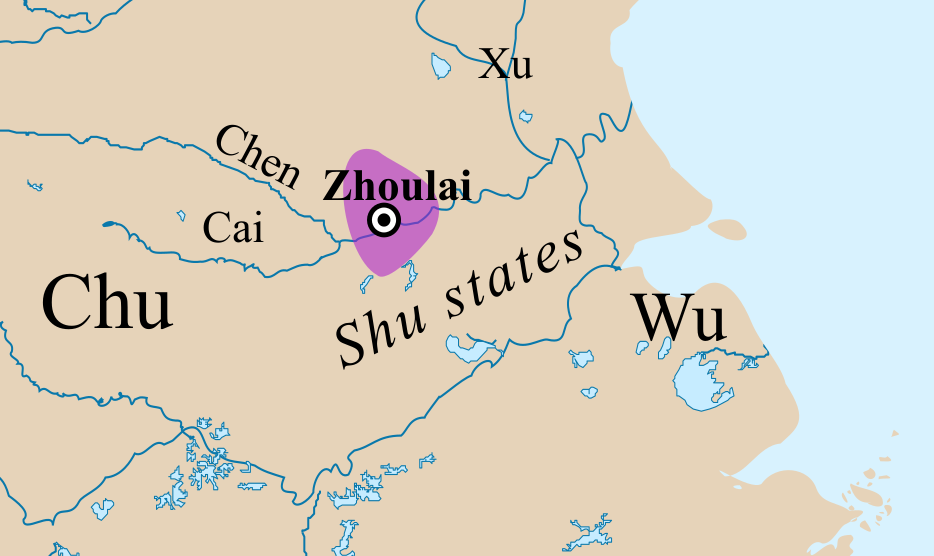
- Zhoulai in the early 7th century BC. Borders are approximate.
- Status: Client / puppet state of Chu (c. 620–529 BC)
- Capital: Zhoulai (present-day Fengtai County)
- Common languages: Old Chinese
- Government: Monarchy
- Historical era: Spring and Autumn period
  - Established: Unknown
  - Subjugated by Chu: c. 620 BC
  - Conquered by Wu: 529 BC
Succeeded by
Wu (state)
- Today part of: China

Zhoulai (Chinese: 州來) was a small state of the Spring and Autumn period that ruled a crucial part of the middle Huai River valley. Its capital, known by the same name, was located in modern-day Fengtai County in Huainan. Due to its strategic location, Zhoulai controlled the most important route from Hubei to the Yellow Sea. This made it a target of the expansionist state of Chu, which subjugated Zhoulai in the late 7th century BC in order to gain access to the east. While nominally allowed to maintain autonomy under its own dynasty, Zhoulai effectively became a puppet state under Chu military occupation and civil administration. It survived in this condition until 529 BC, when its capital city was conquered by Wu and its ruling family was formally deposed.

== History ==
As very little is recorded of Zhoulai in contemporary historical records, both its foundation date as well as its ruling family are unknown. The whole Huai River valley, including the later location of Zhoulai, were originally occupied by the indigenous Huaiyi peoples. These tribes formed a confederation in c. 944 BC that was led by the eastern state of Xu and opposed the Zhou dynasty. Hanmo Zhang considers it likely that Zhoulai was founded in the 8th century BC, during which the aforementioned confederation broke apart.

In the early 7th century BC, Zhoulai occupied a territory that stretched from Bozhou in the north to Shouchun (central Anhui) in the south. In the west and north it bordered on several competing Zhou states, such as Chen and Cai, to its south were Liu (六), Liao, and the Shu states, and in the east were Zhongli as well as the remaining rump state of Xu.

Zhoulai's situation became critical from 623 BC onwards, when Chu advanced from the Upper Huai River into the former's direct vicinity. While contemporary historical chronicles report that Chu conquered many of the local polities during this time, nothing is recorded of Zhoulai's fate. Blakeley considers it likely, however, that it was subjugated between 620–600 BC. Instead of fully extinguishing it, Chu formally made Zhoulai one of its vassal states. In fact, however, Zhoulai appears to have become little more than a puppet state, as its capital was from then on regarded as a Chu city and military base.

Beginning in 584 BC, the state of Wu challenged Chu's hegemony in the Huai valley and Huainan (south of the Huai). In the following decades, Zhoulai was repeatedly attacked by Wu forces, causing Chu to strengthen the puppet state's fortifications in 537 BC. Five years later, Zhoulai was forced by Chu to cede its northern territories to the state of Xǔ, which had by then relocated to Bozhou. In 529 BC, the powerless puppet state was eventually conquered by Wu, which extinguished Zhoulai by deposing its ruling dynasty. Afterwards, Zhoulai becamer part of the fief of Prince Ji Zha, brother of King Zhufan of Wu.

The city of Zhoulai remained under Wu's direct control until 493 BC, when its staunch ally Cai came under Chu attack. Wu allowed Cai to move east and resettle in Zhoulai, and Cai was reduced to Wu's client state. From then on, Zhoulai was known as Xiacai (lit. "Lower Cai"). After the state of Yue destroyed Wu in 473 BC, Chu recaptured Zhoulai from Cai in 447 BC.
