= Gumie =

Chinese kingdom

Gumie 姑蔑
- ?–c. 480 BCE
- Status: Kingdom
- Capital: Gumie (modern day Quzhou, Zhejiang)
- Government: Monarchy
- Historical era: Spring and Autumn period
  - Established: ?
  - Conquered by King Goujian of Yue: c. 480 BCE
Succeeded by
Yue (state)

Gumie (Chinese: 姑蔑; pinyin: Gūmiè) was a small state during the Zhou dynasty and Spring and Autumn period (722–479 BCE) running from southwest of Yue, in China's modern day southwestern Zhejiang province, around the cities of Jinhua and Quzhou, to Yushan in northern Jiangxi Province. It was conquered by King Goujian of Yue during the height of Yue expansionism, after which the area fell under Chu control after the fall of Yue to Chu. Eventually, the area was conquered by Qin after the conquest of Chu by Qin. Its ruling clan is believed to have been the same as that of Xu, that of Ying (嬴).

== Identification ==
Gumie is argued to have been a remnant polity of the Dongyi people who populated much of Eastern China.

== Tomb complex ==
A tomb complex that has been discovered in Qujiang District, Quzhou City of Zhejiang Province is likely the royal burial site of Gumie. Four of the ten tombs have been excavated between 2018 and 2021.

== See also ==
- Dongyi
- Dapeng (state)
- Xu (state)
- Ju (state)
- Tan (state)
- Lai (state)
