= Xiong Yuan =

Xiong Yuan may refer to:

- Jia'ao, king of Chu (r. 544–541 BC), personal name Xiong Yuan (熊員)
- King Kaolie of Chu (r. 262–238 BC), personal name Xiong Yuan (熊元)
