= Zi'ao =

Chinese King of Chu in 529 BC

Xiong Bi 熊比

King of Chu
- Reign: 529 BC
- Predecessor: King Ling
- Successor: King Ping
- Died: 529 BC
Names
- Ancestral name: Mǐ (羋); Lineage name: Xióng (熊); Given name: Bǐ (比); Courtesy name: Zǐgān (子干)
- House: Mi
- Dynasty: Chu
- Father: King Gong

Zi'ao (Chinese: 訾敖; pinyin: Zī'áo), personal name Xiong Bi, was a ruler of the Chu state. His reign lasted less than twenty days in 529 BC.

== Life ==
Bi was the third son of King Gong of Chu. In 541 BC, his second elder brother Wei murdered his nephew Jia'ao and usurped the throne. In fear of his life, Bi fled to Jin while his younger brother Heigong fled to Zheng. Wei became King Ling of Chu.

Later, King Ling conquered the Chen and Cai. The former ministers of both states soon developed plans to regain the two states' independence from Chu. In 529 BC, King Ling led his troops to attack Xu. In the meantime, Bi and Heigong, along with their youngest brother, Qiji, met with the former Chen and Cai ministers and developed a plot that managed to overthrow King Ling. Sons of King Ling were killed. As the eldest of the three brothers, Bi took the throne of Chu. King Ling was abandoned by his troops and committed suicide days later, but initially his death was not widely known.

Later, Chaowu, a former minister of Cai, tried to persuade Qiji to become the new king. However, Qiji said he would be opposed if he tried to take the throne from his elder brothers. Chaowu knew that Qiji really wanted to be king so they came up with a plan. They pretended to be defeated by the returning King Ling and announced that King Ling would soon return. Bi and Heigong were so fearful of King Ling's return that they both committed suicide. However, the army that was supposed to be led by King Ling was actually led by Qiji. With all his elder brothers and nephews gone, Qiji managed to ascend the throne indisputably as King Ping of Chu.

Bi was buried at Zi as a prince. As a result, he is commonly known as "Zi'ao".

Zi'ao House of Mi Died: 529 BC
Regnal titles
| Preceded by King Ling of Chu | King of Chu; 529 BC | Succeeded by King Ping of Chu |
