= Early Chinese contact with Taiwan =

The earliest confirmed descriptions of visits by Han Chinese people to Taiwan occurred during the Yuan dynasty (1271–1368) and Chinese objects such as pottery were found there, suggesting trade between Taiwanese indigenous peoples and the Han Chinese in prior periods. Trade between Han and Taiwanese indigenous peoples increased during the Ming dynasty (1368–1644). Pirates and fishermen also started visiting Taiwan. By the early 17th century, there were 1,500–2,000 Han people inhabiting one or two villages in southwestern Taiwan. Most of them were engaged in seasonal fishing and left afterwards but some stayed and planted crops.

== Theories of early contact ==
=== Eastern Wu (222–280) ===
Early Chinese histories mention visits to eastern islands that some historians identify with Taiwan. Troops of the Three Kingdoms state of Eastern Wu are recorded visiting an island known as Yizhou in the spring of 230. They brought back several thousand natives but 80 to 90 percent of the soldiers died to unknown diseases. Some scholars have identified this island as Taiwan while others do not.

=== Sui dynasty (581–618) ===
The Book of Sui relates that Emperor Yang of the Sui dynasty sent three expeditions to a place called "Liuqiu" early in the 7th century. They brought back captives, cloth, and armour. The Liuqiu described by the Book of Sui had pigs and chicken but no cows, sheep, donkeys, or horses. It produced little iron, had no writing system, taxation, or penal code, and was ruled by a king with four or five commanders. The natives used stone blades and practiced slash-and-burn agriculture to grow rice, millet, sorghum, and beans. Later the name Liuqiu (whose characters are read in Japanese as "Ryukyu") referred to the island chain to the northeast of Taiwan, but some scholars believe it may have referred to Taiwan in the Sui period. Okinawa Island was referred to by the Chinese as "Great Liuqiu" and Taiwan as "Lesser Liuqiu".

== Song dynasty (960–1279) ==
Han Chinese fishermen had settled on the Penghu Islands by 1171, when "Bisheye" bandits, a Taiwanese people related to the Bisaya of the Visayas, landed on Penghu and plundered fields planted by Chinese migrants. The Song dynasty sent soldiers after them, and from that time on Song patrols regularly visited Penghu in the spring and summer. A local official, Wang Dayou, stationed troops there to prevent depredations from the Bisheye.

== Yuan dynasty (1271–1368) ==
During the Mongol-led Yuan dynasty (1271–1368), Han Chinese people started visiting Taiwan. The first Yuan emperor, Kublai Khan, sent officials to the Ryukyu Kingdom in 1292 to demand its loyalty to the Yuan dynasty, but the officials ended up in Taiwan and mistook it for Ryukyu. After three soldiers were killed, the delegation immediately retreated to Quanzhou in China. Another expedition was sent in 1297. Wang Dayuan visited Taiwan in 1349 and noted that the customs of its inhabitants were different from those of Penghu's population, but did not mention the presence of other Chinese. He described the lifestyles of people living in different regions of Taiwan called Liuqiu and Pisheye. He mentioned the presence of Chuhou pottery from present day Lishui, Zhejiang, suggesting that Chinese merchants had already visited the island by the 1340s.

== Wang Dayuan ==
In 1349, Wang Dayuan provided the first written account of a visit to Taiwan. He found no Chinese settlers there but many on Penghu.

Wang called different regions of Taiwan Liuqiu and Pisheye. According to Wang, Liuqiu was a vast land of huge trees and mountains named Cuilu, Zhongman, Futou, and Dazhi. A mountain could be seen from Penghu. He climbed the mountain and could see the coasts. Wang described a rich land with fertile fields that was hotter than Penghu. Its people had different customs from Penghu. They did not have boats and oars but only rafts. The men and women bound their hair and wore colored garments. They obtained salt from boiled sea water and liquor from fermented sugarcane juice. There were barbarian lords and chiefs that were respected by the people and they had a bone-and-flesh relationship between father and son. They practiced cannibalism against their enemies. The land's products included gold, beans, millet, sulphur, beeswax, deer hide, leopards, and moose. They accepted pearls, agates, gold, beads, dishware, and pottery as items of trade.

According to Wang, Pisheye was located to the east. It had extensive mountains and plains but the people did not engage in much agriculture or produce any products. The weather was hotter than Liuqiu. Its people wore their hair in tufts, tattooed their bodies with black juice, and wrapped red silk and yellow cloth around their heads. Pisheye had no chief. Its people hid in wild mountains and solitary valleys. They practiced raiding and plundering by boat. Kidnapping and slave trading were common. The historian Efren B. Isorena, through analysis of historical accounts and wind currents in the Pacific side of East and Southeast Asia, concluded that the Pisheye of Taiwan and the Bisaya of the Visayas islands in the Philippines, were closely related people as Visayans were recorded to have travelled to Taiwan from the Philippines via the northward windcurrents before they raided China and returned south after the southwards monsoon during summer.

== Ming dynasty (1368–1644) ==
By the early 16th century, increasing numbers of Chinese fishermen, traders and pirates were visiting the southwestern part of the island. Some merchants from Fujian were familiar enough with the indigenous peoples of Taiwan to speak Formosan languages. The people of Fujian sailed closer to Taiwan and the Ryukyus in the mid-16th century to trade with Japan while evading Ming authorities. Chinese who traded in Southeast Asia also began taking an East Sea Compass Course (dongyang zhenlu) that passed southwestern and southern Taiwan. Some of them traded with the Taiwanese aborigines. During this period, Taiwan was referred to as Xiaodong dao ("little eastern island") and Dahui guo ("the country of Dahui"), a corruption of Tayouan, a tribe that lived on an islet near modern Tainan from which the name "Taiwan" is derived. By the late 16th century, Chinese from Fujian were settling in southwestern Taiwan. The Chinese pirates Lin Daoqian and Lin Feng visited Taiwan in 1563 and 1574 respectively. Lin Daoqian was a Hakka pirate from Chaozhou who was chased out of Fujian in 1563 by Ming naval forces led by Yu Dayou and fled to Beigang in southwestern Taiwan. He left the next year to ravage the mainland and stayed active in the region until 1578 when he left for Southeast Asia. Lin Feng moved his pirate forces to Wankan (in modern Chiayi County) in Taiwan on 3 November 1574 and used it as a base to launch raids. They left for Penghu after being attacked by natives and the Ming navy dislodged them from their bases. He later returned to Wankan on 27 December 1575 but left for Southeast Asia after losing a naval encounter with Ming forces on 15 January 1576. The pirate Yan Siqi also used Taiwan as a base. In 1593, Ming officials started issuing ten licenses each year for Chinese junks to trade in northern Taiwan. Chinese records show that after 1593, each year five licenses were granted for trade in Keelung and five licenses for Tamsui. However these licenses merely acknowledged already existing illegal trade at these locations.

Initially, Chinese merchants arrived in northern Taiwan and sold iron and textiles to the aboriginal peoples in return for coal, sulfur, gold, and venison. Later the southwestern part of Taiwan surpassed northern Taiwan as the destination for Chinese traders. The southwest had mullet fish, which drew more than a hundred fishing junks from Fujian each year during winter. The fishing season lasted six to eight weeks. Some of them camped on Taiwan's shores and many began trading with the indigenous people for deer products. The southwestern Taiwanese trade was of minor importance until after 1567 when it was used as a location outside of Ming control to circumvent its ban on Sino-Japanese trade, particularly for Fujianese buyers of Japanese silver. The Chinese bought deerskins from the aborigines and sold them to Japanese merchants for a large profit.

Chen Di visited Taiwan in 1603 on an expedition against the Wokou pirates. The pirates were defeated and they met a native chieftain who presented them with gifts. Chen recorded these events in an account of Taiwan known as Dongfanji (An Account of the Eastern Barbarians) and described the natives of Taiwan and their lifestyle.

When a Portuguese ship sailed past southwestern Taiwan in 1596, several of its crew members who had been shipwrecked there in 1582 noticed that the land had become cultivated and now had people working it, presumably by settlers from Fujian. When the Dutch arrived in 1623, they found about 1,500 Chinese visitors and residents. Most of them were engaged in seasonal fishing, hunting, and trading. The population fluctuated throughout the year peaking during winter. A small minority brought Chinese plants with them and grew crops such as apples, oranges, bananas, watermelons. Some estimates of the Chinese population put it at 2,000. There were two Chinese villages. The larger one was located on an island that formed the Bay of Tayouan. It was inhabited year-round. The smaller village was located on the mainland and would eventually become the city of Tainan. In the early 17th century, a Chinese man described it as being inhabited by pirates and fishermen. One Dutch visitor noted that an aboriginal village near the Sino-Japanese trade center had a large number of Chinese and there was "scarcely a house in this village . . . that does not have one or two or three, or even five or six Chinese living there." The villagers' speech contained many Chinese words and sounded like "a mixed and broken language."

== Chen Di ==
In January–February 1603, Chen Di visited Taiwan on an expedition against the Wokou pirates. General Shen of Wuyu defeated the wokou and met with the chieftain Damila, who presented gifts of deer and liquor as thanks for getting rid of the pirates. Later, General Shen returned again and commanded a force to Keelung, driving off a Tokugawa shogunate expedition to seize the island. Chen witnessed these events and wrote an account of Taiwan known as Dongfanji (An Account of the Eastern Barbarians), in which he described the lifestyle of the natives as well as the presence of Chinese people living with them.

=== Aboriginal lifestyle ===
According to Chen, the Eastern Barbarians lived on an island beyond Penghu. They lived in Wanggang, Jialaowan, Dayuan (variation of Taiwan), Yaogang, Dagouyu, Xiao Danshui, Shuangqikou, Jialilin, Shabali, and Dabangkeng. Their land extended several thousand li covering villages where people lived separately in groups of five hundred to a thousand people. They had no chief but the one with the most children, who was considered a hero and obeyed by the populace. The people liked to fight and run in their free time so that the soles of their feet were very thick, able to tread on thorny brushes. They ran as fast as a horse. Chen figured they could cover several hundred li in a day. During quarrels between villages, they sent warriors to kill each other on an agreed upon date, but the conflicts ended without any enmity between them. They practiced headhunting. Thieves were killed at the village altar.

The land was warm to the point that people wore no clothes during winter. Women wore plait grass skirts that only covered their lower body. The men cut their hair while the women did not. The men pierced their ears while the women decorated their teeth. Chen considered the women to be sturdy and active, working constantly, while the men usually idled. They did not bow or kneel. They had no knowledge of a calendar or writing and understood a full moon cycle as a month with a year being ten months. They eventually forgot the count and lost track of their own age.

Their houses were made with thatch and bamboo, which grew tall and thick in abundance. Tribes had a common-house where all the unmarried boys lived. Matters of deliberation were discussed at the common-house. When a boy saw a girl he wished to marry, he sent her a pair of agate beads. If the girl accepted them, the boy went to her house at night and played an instrument called the kouqin. Upon acknowledgement by the girl, the boy stayed the night. When a child was born, she went to the man's home to fetch him back as a son-in-law and he would live with her family supporting them for the rest of their lives. Girls were preferred because of this. Men could remarry upon their wives' death but not women. Corpses were dried and buried beneath their families' houses when they needed to be rebuilt.

=== Agriculture ===
They did not have irrigated fields and cleared areas by fire before planting their crop. Once the mountain flowers bloomed they plowed their fields and once the grain ripened they were plucked. Their grains included soya bean, lentil, sesame, pearl-barley, but no wheat. For vegetables they had onions, ginger, sweet potatoes, and taro. For fruits they had coconuts, persimmons, citron and sugarcane. Rice grains were longer and tastier than the grains Chen was accustomed to. They gathered herbs and mixed them with fermented rice to make liquor. During banquets they drank the liquor by pouring it into a bamboo tube. No food was served during these occasions. They danced and sang songs to music. For domesticated animals they had cats, dogs, pigs, and chicken, but not horses, donkeys, cattle, sheep, geese, or deer. There were wild tigers, bears, leopards, and deer. Deer inhabited the mountains and moved in herds of a hundred or a thousand. Men hunted deer using spears made of bamboo shafts and iron points. They also hunted tigers. Deer hunts only occurred in the winter when they came out in herds. They ate deer meat and pig meat but not chicken.

=== Foreign relations ===
Although they lived on an island they did not have boats and feared the sea. They only fished in small streams. They had no contact with any of the non-Chinese peoples outside Taiwan. During the Yongle period (1403–1424), Zheng He carried an Imperial Edict to the Eastern Barbarians, but the indigenous people of Taiwan remained hidden and would not be coerced. Their families were given brass bells to hang around their necks to symbolize their status as dogs, but they kept the bells and handed them down as treasures. During the 1560s the wokou attacked the indigenous people of Taiwan with firearms, forcing them into the mountains. Afterwards they came into contact with China. Chinese from the harbors of Huimin, Chonglong, and Lieyu in Zhangzhou and Quanzhou learned their languages to trade with them. The Chinese traded things like agate beads, porcelain, cloth, salt, and brass in return for deer meat, skins, and horns. They obtained Chinese clothing that they only put on while dealing with the Chinese and took them off for storage afterwards. Chen saw their way of life, without hat or shoe, going about naked, to be easy and simple.

== Bibliography ==
- Andrade, Tonio (2008). How Taiwan Became Chinese (Project Gutenberg ed.). Columbia University Press. ISBN 978-0-231-12855-1.
- ——— (2011), Lost Colony: The Untold Story of China's First Great Victory Over the West (illustrated ed.), Princeton University Press, ISBN 978-0-691-14455-9
- ——— (2016), The Gunpowder Age: China, Military Innovation, and the Rise of the West in World History, Princeton University Press, ISBN 978-0-691-13597-7
- Hang, Xing (2010), Between Trade and Legitimacy, Maritime and Continent
- ——— (2015), Conflict and Commerce in Maritime East Asia: The Zheng Family and the Shaping of the Modern World, c. 1620–1720
- Hsu, Wen-hsiung (1980). "From Aboriginal Island to Chinese Frontier: The Development of Taiwan before 1683". In Knapp, Ronald G. (ed.). China's Island Frontier: Studies in the Historical Geography of Taiwan. The University of Hawaii. pp. 3–28. hdl:10125/62865. ISBN 978-0-8248-8004-0.
- Isorena, Efren B. (2004). "The Visayan Raiders of the China Coast, 1174–1190 Ad". Philippine Quarterly of Culture and Society. 32 (2): 73–95. JSTOR 29792550.
- Liu, Yingsheng (2012), "The Taiwan Strait between the Twelfth and Sixteenth Centuries and the Maritime Route to Luzon", Journal of Asian History, 46 (2): 167–180, JSTOR 41933619
- Thompson, Lawrence G. (1964). "The earliest eyewitness accounts of the Formosan aborigines". Monumenta Serica. 23: 163–204. doi:10.1080/02549948.1964.11731044. JSTOR 40726116.
- Wills, John E. Jr. (2007). "The Seventeenth-century Transformation: Taiwan under the Dutch and the Cheng Regime". In Rubinstein, Murray A. (ed.). Taiwan: A New History (expanded ed.). M.E. Sharpe. pp. 84–106. ISBN 978-0-7656-1495-7.
- Wong, Young-tsu (2017), China's Conquest of Taiwan in the Seventeenth Century: Victory at Full Moon, Springer, ISBN 978-981-10-2248-7
- Xiong, Victor Cunrui (2012), Emperor Yang of the Sui Dynasty: His Life, Times, and Legacy, SUNY Press, ISBN 978-0-7914-8268-1.
