= King Ling of Chu =

Chinese King of Chu from 540 to 529 BC

King Ling of Chu 楚靈王

King of Chu
- Reign: 540–529 BC
- Predecessor: Xiong Yuan
- Successor: Xiong Bi
- Died: 529 BC
- Issue: Xiong Lu (熊祿); Xiong Badi (熊罷敵)
Names
- Ancestral name: Mǐ (羋); Lineage name: Xióng (熊); Given name: initially Wéi (圍), later Qián (虔)
Posthumous name
- King Ling (靈王)
- House: Mi
- Dynasty: Chu
- Father: King Gong

King Ling of Chu
- Traditional Chinese: 楚靈王
- Simplified Chinese: 楚灵王
Transcriptions
Standard Mandarin
- Hanyu Pinyin: Chǔ Líng Wáng

King Ling of Chu, personal name Xiong Qian, was a king of the Chu state, reigning from 540 BC to 529 BC.

== Taking the throne ==
Wei was the second son of King Gong of Chu, younger brother of King Kang of Chu and uncle of Jia'ao. When Jia'ao took the throne, Wei served as prime minister and always behaved as if he was the king. By then he had married a member of the Feng clan from the State of Zheng. Taking advantage of Jia'ao's sickness, Wei murdered Jia'ao along with his two sons. He buried Jia'ao at Jia, thus making the place name the style for the late young king. Wei took the throne and changed his personal name to Xiong Qian (熊虔). In the wake of his regicide, two of his younger brothers, Bi and Heigong fled in fear for their lives.

As King Ling did not receive the throne legally, he was eager to gain a good reputation with the other lords. At that time, Qing Feng, former prime minister of Qi and one of the murderers of Duke Zhuang II of Qi, had taken refuge in the State of Wu where the king of Wu had placed him in the town of Zhufang. King Ling sacked Zhufang, captured Qing Feng and killed all the Qing family. In front of the other lords, he ordered Qing Feng to say, "Never follow the example of Qing Feng, who murdered his duke, bullied the people and threatened other ministers to get them to support him." But Qing Feng rebuffed the king, saying, "Never follow the example of Prince Wei of Chu, who murdered the king who was the son of his elder brother and threatens other lords in order to gain their support." King Ling was so upset that he immediately ordered Qing Feng executed.

In his third year after taking the throne, King Ling tried to gather the lords at Shen (in the State of Chu), but he was disappointed. In 534 BC, the State of Chen suffered internal disorder. Duke Ai of Chen favoured his second son Liu rather than his legal heir Yanshi, so he asked his younger brothers Zhao and Guo to ensure that Yanshi would pass the throne to Liu in the future. But Zhao and Guo knew that Yanshi would rather pass the throne to his own adult son, Wu. So they killed Yanshi, which also led to the death of Duke Ai, who was so upset when he heard what had happened. Zhao and Guo installed Liu as the new marquis of Chen, so Wu and Sheng, the youngest son of Duke Ai, went to King Ling for help. King Ling soon conquered Chen. Liu fled, whilst Zhao killed Guo and attributed the blame to Guo. Instead of installing Wu as the new marquis, King Ling made Chen a prefecture of Chu, destroyed its ancestral temple and took Wu back to Chu. He then appointed a general named Chuan Fengshu as Duke of Chen.

In 531 BC, King Ling tricked and captured Marquis Ling of Cai, blamed him for killing his own father (Marquis Jing of Cai) and executed him. He also ordered his youngest brother Prince Qiji to attack the State of Cai. Other lords tried to mediate, but their attempts were finally in vain. Eventually Qiji sacked Cai and captured the heir to Cai named You. In order to show his respect for the gods, King Ling ordered You executed. Qiji was made Duke of Cai. He also conquered some other minor states and had their people resettled.

Later, after becoming frustrated by Wu troops, King Ling built a grand palace for his enjoyment. The palace was named Zhanghua Palace and possessed a high terrace. He considered the family of his consort too humble to be related to his queen, so he sought and gained a marriage to a high born woman from the State of Jin. King Ling subsequently installed his new Jin wife as his queen.

== Downfall ==
In winter 529 BC, King Ling set off to attack the State of Xu and set up his camp at Qianxi. He was nearly persuaded to withdraw, but soon his generals reported some victories, which made King Ling too confident about sacking Xu to withdraw.

While King Ling was away, Chu was subject to a coup. The Duke of Cai, Qiji, decided to unite with his elder brothers Bi and Heigong as well as the people of Chen and Cai. Qiji led his troops to Ying and sacked it. The prime minister, Wei Pi, committed suicide and the two sons of King Ling, Crown Prince Lu and Prince Pidi, were killed by Qiji. Prince Bi was installed on the throne, to be posthumously known as Zi'ao.

== Death ==
After installing King Zi'ao, the rebels informed the soldiers of King Ling, "If you surrender to the new king, all your current posts and lands will remain; otherwise, you will face severe penalties." As soon as the message spread, most of the soldiers scattered, leaving only a few hundred still supporting King Ling. King Ling was very sad about the death of his sons, but when a servant said that was because the king had murdered too many sons of others, King Ling stopped weeping.

A loyal minister Zheng Dan tried to give some sound advice to King Ling, but King Ling knew that there was nothing he could do. Finally Zheng Dan went to the rebels and told them that the king was depressed by what had happened.

King Ling was eventually left virtually alone. The rebels threatened the people and told them not to provide food or shelter to him, so the king became hungry. Fortunately there was still someone willing to shelter him. This man, Shen Hai, was the son of a late minister named Shen Wuyu. Shen Wuyu had offended King Ling twice, but the violent King Ling never punished him, so Wuyu told his son to pay a debt of gratitude to the king. Shen Hai led King Ling to his home, provided a meal for him and asked his two daughters to serve him. But King Ling was too sad to make love with the young girls, instead, he kept crying all night. At midnight, Shen Hai was told that the king had committed suicide. Hai buried King Ling and killed his two daughters as sacrificial objects.

However, the rebels were not informed of the death of the king. Convinced by his advisors that the king was still alive, Qiji told the rebels that King Ling was leading his troops back. In response, King Zi'ao and Heigong committed suicide. Now, as all his elder brothers had died, Qiji became the new king as King Ping of Chu. While unaware that King Ling was dead, King Ping found a corpse and claimed it the corpse of King Ling. Later Shen Hai told him about the actual death and burial of King Ling. King Ping reburied his elder brother according to the ritual expected of a king and styled him as King Ling.

== Assessment ==
King Ling was thought to be an ambitious but violent ruler. After he took power, some innocent ministers such as Wei Yan, Bo Zhouli and Qu Shen were executed. However, King Ling did have some strengths. Chuan Fengshu once threatened his life while arguing about events that had occurred at the time of King Kang of Zhou (reigned 1020-996 BC) involving his ancestor Xiong Yi, but King Ling installed him as a duke instead of taking revenge. When he captured loyal ministers from his enemies, King Ling seldom had them executed. Instead, he would release them, or even recruit them as his own ministers. In fact, some of King Ping's advisors were the former ministers of Cai recruited by King Ling. While attacking Xu, he had once expressed his admiration for the historian named Yi Xiang, referred to him as "a good historian" and asked Zheng Dan to respect him.

King Ling of Chu House of Mi Died: 529 BC
Regnal titles
Preceded by Jia'ao	King of Chu; 540–529 BC	Succeeded by Zi'ao
