= Yuanhe Maps and Records of Prefectures and Counties =

Gazetteer of China

The Yuanhe Maps and Records of Prefectures and Counties (simplified Chinese: 元和郡县图志; traditional Chinese: 元和郡縣圖志; pinyin: Yuánhé jùn xiàn tú zhì; Wade–Giles: Yüan-he chün hsien t'u chih) compiled by Li Jifu during the Yuanhe reign of the Tang dynasty is one of the earliest and most complete gazetteers of China.

The gazetteer was composed of 40 volumes of text with map and a two volume list of contents. The work was divided up by the 47 key geographic areas (镇) that existed at the time. Each area section included a map and was further broken down by prefecture, state, rivers, military battle sites, etc.

Currently only 34 volumes still exist. By the time of the Southern Song dynasty, the maps, list of contents, and six volumes were missing (Volumes 19, 20, 23, 24, 35, and 36). Because of the loss of the maps, the work is sometimes just titled Yuanhe Records of Prefectures and Counties (元和郡縣志/元和郡县志).

== See also ==
- Kuodi Zhi
- Yuanhe Xingzuan
