= Battle of Yanling =

Battle between the states of Chu and Jin (575 BC)

Date	575 BC
Location	Yanling, Henan
Result	Jin victory

Belligerents
Chu	Jin

Commanders and leaders
King Gong of Chu	Duke Li of Jin

Strength
Unknown	Unknown

Casualties and losses
Unknown	Unknown

The Battle of Yanling (Chinese: 鄢陵之戰) was fought in 575 BC between the states of Chu and Jin at Yanling during the Spring and Autumn period of ancient China. On the Jin side, Xi Qi (郤錡) commanded the right wing whilst Luan Shu (欒書) commanded the center with Han Jue (韓厥) on the left . Prior to the battle, Shi Xie wanted to avoid battle on the basis that external enemies are necessary for internal peace. The Chu army had the numerical advantage but with the exception of the King's personal guard, it was in poor condition. The Chu army was also commanded by Zifan (子反) and Zichong (子重), who hated each other. Following Luan Shu's advice, the Jin army took a defensive posture instead of going on the offensive. By dawn the Jin armies were deployed behind a marsh and ditch, which impeded Chu troops. Fen Huang, a Jin officer, pointed out that the best Chu troops in the center were bogged down by the marsh, leaving the flanks to be held only by badly disciplined 'wild tribes of the south'. Jin chariots then charged both Chu flanks, scattering the enemy. They then proceeded to attack the center, which contained the Chu King commanding his troops. Although the Chu King's life was endangered a couple of times, Jin officers let him escape as a sign of respect. However, he was wounded by an arrow and his army was driven back.
