= Xu (state) =

Ancient Chinese State until conquered by the State of Wu in 512 BC

Xu 徐
- Unknown–512 BC
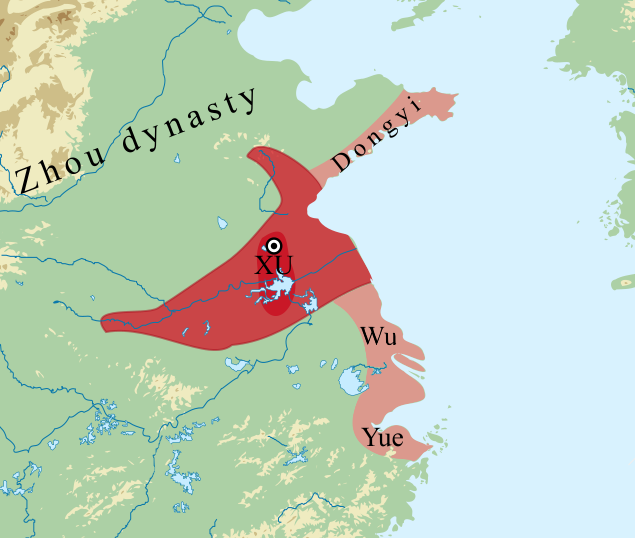
- Xu at its greatest extent in the mid 8th century BC. 1) dark red: Xu heartland; 2) red: Xu-led Huaiyi confederation; 3) pink: Xu allies or under Xu influence.
- Capital: Xu
- Common languages: Old Chinese (lingua franca), local languages
- Religion: Chinese folk religion
- Government: Monarchy
- King
  - fl. 944 BC: Yan
  - ?–512 BC: Zhangyu
- Historical era: Chinese Bronze Age, Spring and Autumn period
  - Established: Unknown
  - Rebellion of the Three Guards: c. 1042–1039 BC
  - Zhou–Huaiyi War: c. 944–943 BC
  - War of Ehou the Border Protector: c. 850 BC
  - Battle of Loulin: 645 BC
  - Conquered by Wu: 512 BC
Preceded by	Succeeded by
Dapeng (state)	Wu (state); Chu (state)
- Today part of: China

Xu (Chinese: 徐; pinyin: Xú), also called Xu Rong (徐戎) or Xu Yi (徐夷) (Note: Literally "Xu barbarians", "Xu foreigners" or "Xu belligerents") by its enemies, was an independent Huaiyi state of the Chinese Bronze Age that was ruled by a branch of the Ying family (嬴) and controlled much of the Huai River valley for at least two centuries. It was centered in northern Jiangsu and Anhui.

An ancient but originally minor state that already existed during the late Shang dynasty, Xu was subjugated by the Western Zhou dynasty around 1039 BC, and was gradually sinified from then on. It eventually regained its independence and formed a confederation of 36 states that became powerful enough to challenge the Zhou empire for supremacy over the Central Plain. Able to consolidate its rule over a territory that stretched from Hubei in the south, through eastern Henan, northern Anhui and Jiangsu, as far north as southern Shandong, Xu's confederation remained a major power until the early Spring and Autumn period. It reached its apogee in the mid 8th century BC, expanding its influence as far as Zhejiang in the south. By that time, however, Xu's confederation began to break up as result of internal unrest. As its power waned, Xu was increasingly threatened by neighboring states, losing control over the Huai River to Chu. Reduced to its heartland, Xu was eventually conquered by Wu in 512 BC.

== History ==
=== Origins ===
Xu was reported by later chronicles to have covered a large area between the Huai and Yellow River during the legendary Xia dynasty.

According to the Rongcheng Shi bamboo slips from the Warring States period, the Yu Gong from the Han dynasty and various other sources, Yu the Great divided the world into the Nine Provinces in prehistoric times, one of them Xu. The Yuanhe Xingzuan, a Tang dynasty compilation of information on the origins of Chinese surnames, as well as the Tongzhi, a Southern Song dynasty historical book, also state that Yu enfeoffed Ruomu, grandson of the mythological emperor Zhuanxu, as lord of Xu around 2100 BC. In turn the Xu peoples were supposed to be Ruomu's descendants. Furthermore, it was claimed this Xu state or province had originally occupied the entire area between the Huai and Yellow River. No contemporary evidence exists to verify this information and the oldest literary sources available, the oracle bones of the Shang dynasty, do not mention such an empire. As result, the stories of Xu's foundation remain legendary.

Archaeological excavations have proven that the area around modern-day Xuzhou, including the later heartland of Xu, was a major trading hub and cultural centre for the Yangshao, Dawenkou and Longshan cultures since the 3rd millennium BC. Oracle bones and later historical records both indicate that the Xuzhou area was occupied by the indigenous Dapeng kingdom since the middle Shang dynasty. A powerful polity, Dapeng was eventually destroyed by the Shang under King Di Xin. In turn, Xu's existence is first reliably reported by the Yi Zhou Shu for 1042 BC, only a few decades after Dapeng's fall. It remains unknown if these two polities were related in any way.

=== Conflict with the Zhou dynasty and rise to power ===
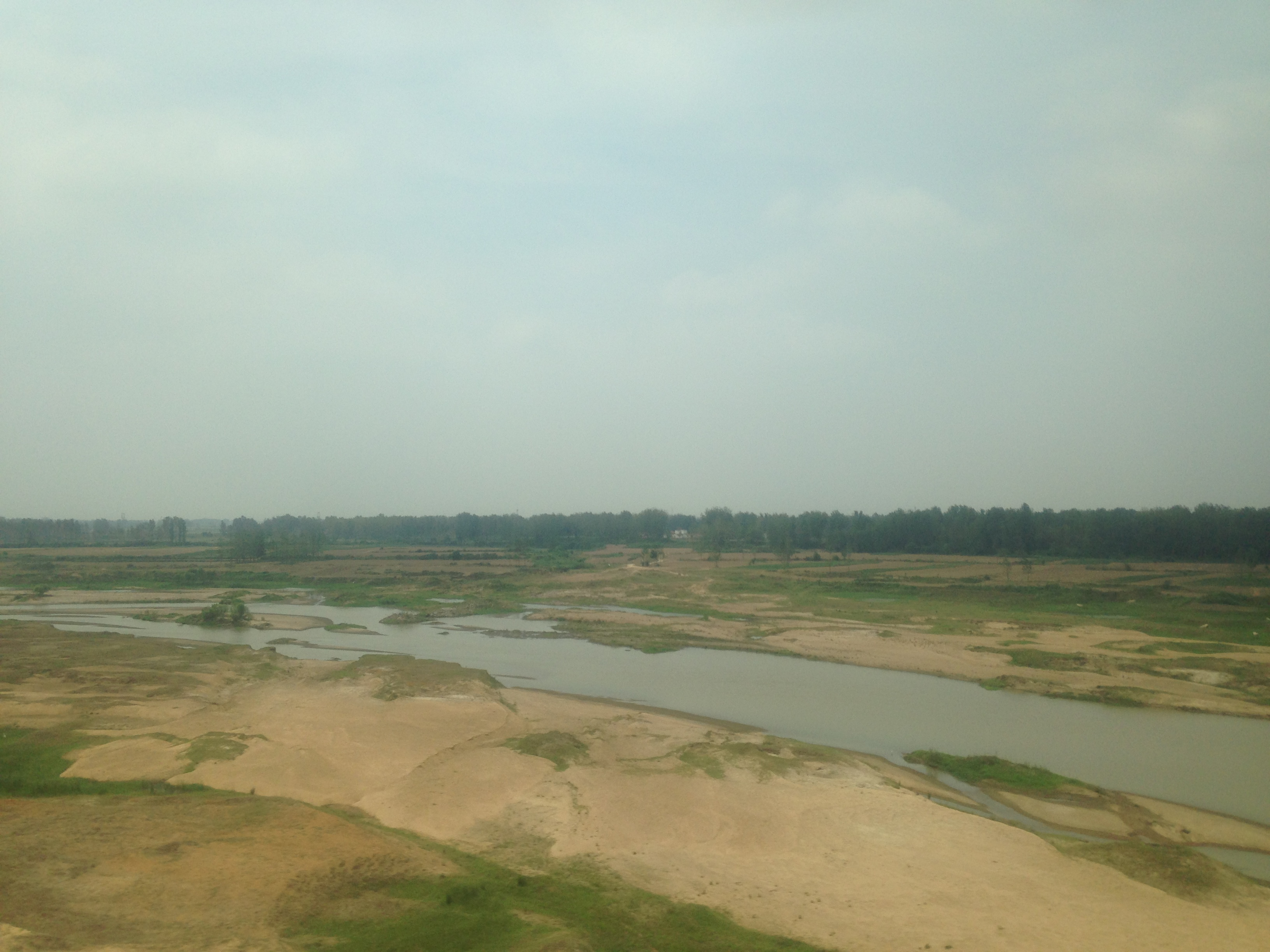
Xu was centered in the Huai River valley

At the time of its first recorded appearance, Xu was already a powerful Yi state that was probably located in southeastern Shandong or northwestern Jiangsu. Besides this state, a number of small Xu enclaves existed in western Shandong. Like the Dongyi states at Pugu and Yan, Xu participated in the Rebellion of the Three Guards against the Duke of Zhou, although it had no known direct relation to the three competing parties. Ralph D. Sawyer speculates that Xu joined the rebels because it did not wanted to alienate its neighboring states that had co-founded the rebel alliance. In contrast to other sources, the Records of the Grand Historian suggest that Xu and the Huaiyi were not involved in the initial rebellion at all, and only clashed with Zhou forces later.

Regardless of Xu's involvement, the rebels eventually lost the war. The Huai River valley was consequently invaded and subjugated by the Zhou royal army in 1039 BC. To what extent Xu was also defeated during that campaign remains unclear; reports in the Zuo Zhuan and the Bamboo Annals make it likely that Xu forces continued to resist the implementation of Zhou power in southeastern Shandong. After the foundation of Lu, Xu and other Huaiyi statelets reportedly attacked the new Zhou state until Bo Qin defeated them. Afterwards, the Xu state appears to have been largely pacified and became a vassal of the Zhou dynasty. In this position, it was strongly influenced by the Zhou culture and also served as link to the dynasty's southernmost ally, Wu. Despite that, Xu remained somewhat defiant, and moved its core area further south into northern Anhui in order to escape the constant pressure from the Zhou dynasty in the north. The Xu enclaves in western Shandong even continued to openly resist, but most of them were destroyed by Lu and Song over time.

After its subjugation, the state of Xu was forced to remain a vassal of the Zhou dynasty for almost one hundred years. The turning point came in the mid 10th century BC: Around 957 BC, the Zhou dynasty lost a disastrous war against Chu. This defeat appears to have thrown the dynasty into chaos. Based on archaeological findings, Edward L. Shaughnessy even speculates that the Zhou dynasty was so weakened that it largely retreated to its capital area, leaving most of its empire to fend for itself. Building upon this theory, historian Manfred Frühauf believes that the Huaiyi, among them Xu, regained their independence as consequence of this general Zhou retreat. Xu consequently grew into a "very powerful state".

Important states and peoples of the Western Zhou period

By 944 BC, Lord Yan of Xu managed to unite thirty-six Dongyi and Huaiyi states under his leadership, declared himself king and proceeded to invade the Zhou empire. The reasons for this invasion are unknown, but Frühauf speculates that it aimed at preventing the Zhou dynasty from restoring its rule over the Huaiyi, while Sawyer considers it possible that the Xu either wanted to plunder the Zhou royal domain or aimed to supplant the Zhou rule and establish their own dynasty. The course and scale of the invasion are equally controversial, based on different interpretations of bronze inscriptions and historical texts. It is even disputed if there was just one or two invasions. Generally agreed, however, is the result of the attacks: Even though the Zhou forces had eventually succeeded in driving the invaders back, they could not subjugate the Huaiyi again and were forced to acknowledge their independence in a peace treaty. If records in the Book of the Later Han, probably based upon early texts of the Bamboo Annals, are to be believed, Xu was particularly strengthened by the war. Recognizing that he could not defeat the Huaiyi, King Mu of Zhou recognized King Yan of Xu as overlord ("officially "elder" or bo) over a large confederation that covered most of the Huai River valley and regions south of it. As result, Xu became the new major power of the east and a serious political rival to the Zhou dynasty. In the course of its political ascent, Xu's cultural influence began to spread as far as the Yangtze delta region. The Han Feizi and other texts claimed that King Mu subsequently requested King Yan to lead his coalition of states against the "Xu Yi", possibly local Xu factions which had not submitted to Yan's regime. The Bamboo Annals stated that Mu later incited the state of Chu to attack Xu.

=== Apogee ===
Xu maintained its dominance over the southeast after King Mu's death, while the armistice proved inadequate to ensure peace. The military contest between the Huaiyi and Zhou kingdom never really stopped, and even though the latter increasingly suffered from internal disorder and even chaos, it remained a formidable adversary for Xu's confederation. King Li of Zhou (857-842/28) (Note: Li effectively ruled only until 842 BC, when he was forced into exile; nevertheless, he remained official king until 828 BC.) led several campaigns against the states of the Huai River, such as Jiao and Yu. In turn, the Huaiyi confederation under Xu began a massive counter offensive in 850 BC, aiming to conquer the North China Plain and to destroy the Zhou rule over the East. Allied with Ehou, rebellious ruler of E, and the Dongyi states, the Huaiyi brought the Zhou dynasty to the brink of destruction. Their forces even reached the Luo and Yi River valleys, threatening or even plundering the dynasty's royal domain. Eventually, however, the anti-Zhou alliance collapsed after the destruction of E by Zhou loyalists, and Xu was driven back.

War was renewed under King Xuan of Zhou, who aimed to restabilize and restore the Zhou kingdom. Enlisting the military aid of several loyalist states of Shandong, he launched a massive campaign against the Xu-led Huaiyi coalition in 822 BC, eventually claiming to have won a great victory. The Classic of Poetry even boasted:

The region of Hsü [Xu] is shaken without interruption,
it trembles in terror, the region of Hsü
as before the rolling and the bursts of thunder,
the region of Hsü trembles for terror!

Notwithstanding these claims, Xuan's expedition probably did not result in a total victory, as Xu does not appear to have been severely weakened during this period. It is more likely that the war ended with a minor Zhou victory or a peace treaty, with tributes sent by the Huaiyi to King Xuan for his remaining reign. According to the Yu Gong, Xu sent pheasant plumes and sounding stones as regular tributes.

Despite Xuan's restoration attempts, the Zhou dynasty's royal power largely collapsed in 771 BC after the Battle of Mount Li, ushering into the Spring and Autumn period. Initially, Xu not only retained its power during this new era of warfare and chaos, but probably further expanded into the south. Xu bronzes from the early Spring and Autumn period were found in southern Jiangsu and northern Zhejiang, indicating the state's influence in or possibly even control over these regions. Around this time, however, Xu also began to suffer from serious internal unrest, resulting in the gradual disintegration of its confederation. Several polities seceded: The Xu enclaves of western Shandong aligned themselves with the state of Lu in 720 BC, (Note: Legge assumes the Rong that interacted with Lu (as detailed in the Zuozhuan) are related to Xu, primarily because of a passage in the Book of Documents which states that Boqin clashed with the Huaiyi and "Xurong", though it's not certain if these Rong groups had any relation to Xu, especially when considering that "Rong" could be a general term used to refer to military adversaries.) the Shu peoples formed independent states, (Note: The Shu states (舒) were a group of minor city-states belonging to a single Xu-related tribal group that were located between central and southwestern Anhui. These states should not be confused with Shu of Sichuan.) the state of Zhoulai occupied the middle Huai River valley, and a part of ruling Ying family broke off to form their own state, Zhongli.

=== Conflict with the northern states ===
Despite its confederation's end, the Xu kingdom still held considerable power, so that the dukes Yin and Huan of Lu tried to remain "on good terms with [the Xu peoples]". Their successor, Duke Zhuang of Lu, on the other side, considered the remaining Xu tribes of Shandong a threat and started a war to eliminate them. By that time, the only remaining northern Xu enclave of any significance was centered at Caozhou, holding the local marshes from where the Chi River originated. According to the Zuo Zhuan, the continued raiding activities of the Caozhou-Xu were responsible for the war. Duke Zhuang was able to gain the military assistance of Song, Zheng, and, most importantly, the powerful state of Qi. On the other side, the Xu of Shandong allied with the Xu kingdom. Qi first attacked the Xu of Shandong in 674 BC, but failed to subdue them. In 667, the Qi-led coalition launched not only another assault on Caozhou, but also invaded Xu's territory in the Huai River valley. While the latter state remained undefeated, the Caozhou-Xu were destroyed, and with them, the last remnants of Xu rule in Shandong. Afterwards, relations between Xu and its northern neighbors improved.

=== Wars with Chu and decline ===
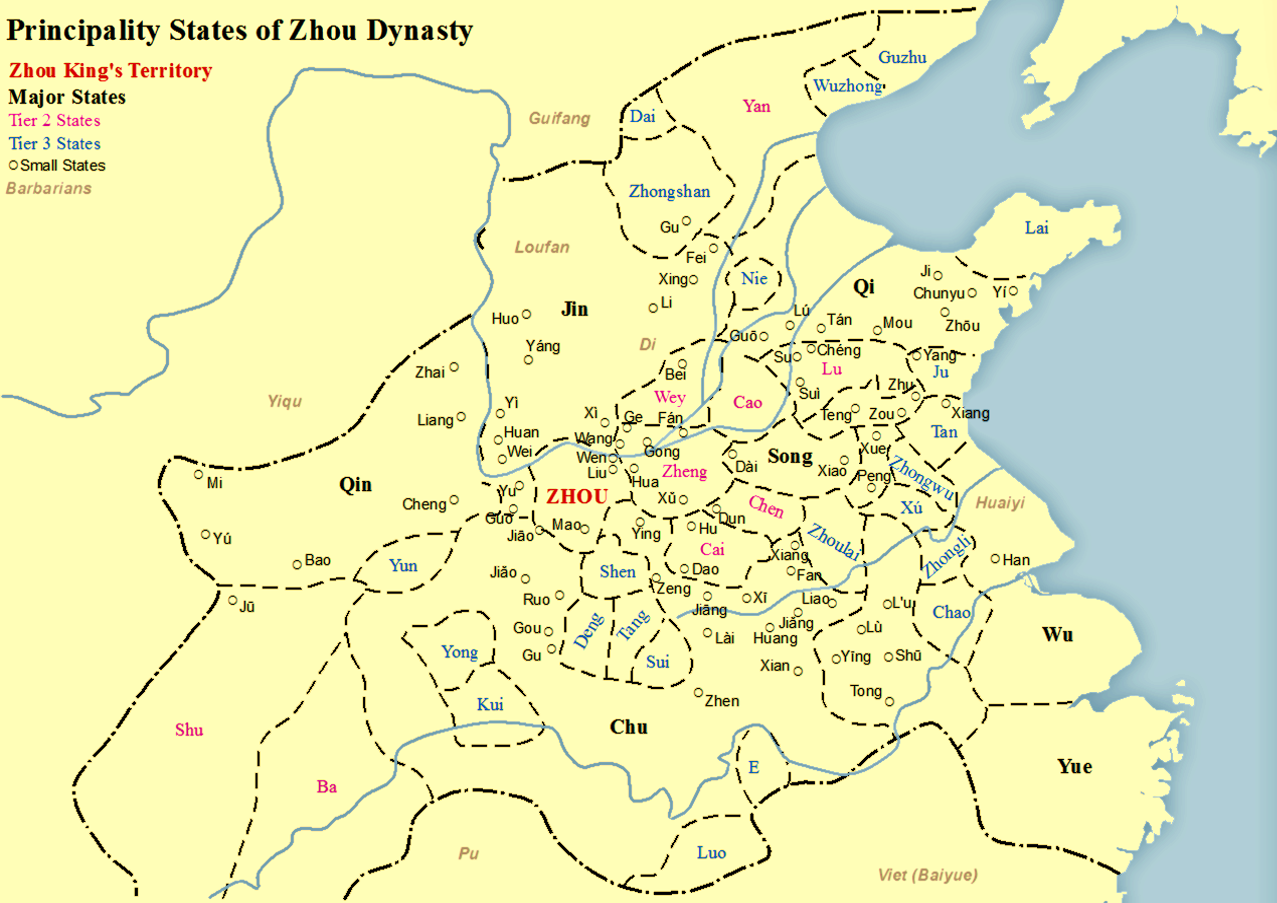
A map showing the remaining rump state of Xu between its more powerful neighbors.

Beginning in 655 BC, the state of Chu began to expand into the Huai River valley, causing several local Huaiyi polities such as the Shu states to ally with it in order to profit from its military assistance. In response to this aggressive expansion into its heartland, the Xu kingdom began to cooperate with Chu's northern enemies, and occupied one of the now-hostile Shu states in 656 BC. Chu retaliated in 645 BC, and launched an invasion of Xu. Duke Huan of Qi, hegemon of China at that time, organised an alliance of Qi, Lu, Song, Chen, Wey, Zheng, Cao, and Xǔ to aid Xu. They sent an expedition to relieve the small kingdom, but the anti-Chu alliance was decisively defeated during the Battle of Loulin. While it was not destroyed and continued to fight for its independence, Xu was severely weakened, marking the beginning of its final decline.

With Xu's decline, other states of the Huai River began to grow in power. In its direct vicinity, the state of Zhongli grew into "one of the most important regional states of the [river's] middle reaches". Sometime between 644 and 600 BC, its ruler, Lord Bai, defeated Xu in battle. In 643 BC, Xu and its ally Qi invaded Yingshi in Lu'an, a vassal state of Chu. According to Zuo Qiuming, "this expedition was undertaken by Qi in the interest of Xu, to avenge (...) the defeat of Xu by Chu at Loulin". After 622 BC, Chu forced the remaining states along the middle Huai River into vassalage, destroying any of them that continued open resistance. It also concluded a pact with Wu and Yue, "which kept them from wooing the Shu states for a quarter century". As result, Chu became the unchallenged ruler of most of the Huai River valley, so that Xu increasingly fell under Chu's influence as well. Despite this, the extremely weakened kingdom continued to conspire with other states against Chu. In 620 BC, Xu undertook a campaign against Ju in Shandong.

Chu's dominance over the Huai River valley was broken in 584 BC, when Wu launched a large-scale western offensive, during which Xu was also attacked by Wu forces. From then on, Wu and Chu constantly fought each other for supremacy over the Huai River valley. Xu found itself under pressure by both of these powerful states. Even though its political powers were further weakened, it experienced its cultural zenith during this period.

Since 542 BC, Xu became inclined to side against Chu with Wu in order to regain its full independence, with King Yichu marrying a Wu princess. This new alliance resulted in grave consequences for Xu in 539 BC. In that year, King Ling of Chu called for meeting of the states at the former capital of Shen, wanting them to accept him as new hegemon of China. Although hostile to Chu, Xu's ruler was obliged to be present at the meeting as he feared a possible retaliation. At Shen, however, Chu's ruler had Yichu seized because of his close connections to Wu. He then compelled Xu to participate in an invasion of Wu in 537 BC. One year later, King Yichu escaped and returned to his capital. King Ling of Chu, fearing that Xu would revolt, promptly invaded the small kingdom. Wu came to Xu's aid, however, and defeated Chu's army. Afterwards, Xu openly aligned itself with Wu.

In winter 530 BC, King Ling of Chu led another army to besiege and conquer Xu's capital in order to prepare an invasion of Wu. The siege lasted until the next summer, when Zi'ao launched a coup at Ying and took control of Chu's government. King Ling's army then almost completely deserted him, while the remaining loyal troops broke off the siege of Xu and began to retreat to Chu, only to be overwhelmed and destroyed by an army of Wu at Yuzhang.

In 526 BC, Duke Jing of Qi wanted to restore Qi's old hegemony, and launched an invasion of Xu. Instead of resisting, Xu's ruler simply submitted and paid tribute to the duke, so that the latter returned to Qi without any fighting. Contemporary writer Zuo Qiuming believed that this hinted at the small states' increasing weakness, as they no longer had a leader among them capable of resisting invaders who were "devoid of principle".

=== Fall and legacy ===
Eventually, Xu became involved in a succession dispute of Wu in 515 BC, when it sheltered Prince Yanyu from his nephew, King Helü of Wu. Three years later, Helü ordered Xu to hand the fugitive over, but King Zhangyu of Xu sympathized with Yanyu and let him go. Yanyu then fled to the state of Chu, which agreed to help him. Enraged about the course of events, Helü invaded Xu. Aided by the famous military strategist Sun Tzu, Helü ordered his troops to raise "embankments on the hills so as to lay the [kingdom's] capital under water". Although Chu sent an army to relieve Xu, the situation in the besieged city became unbearable, so that Zhangyu went forth with his wife to personally surrender to King Helü. Hereby, Xu was extinguished.

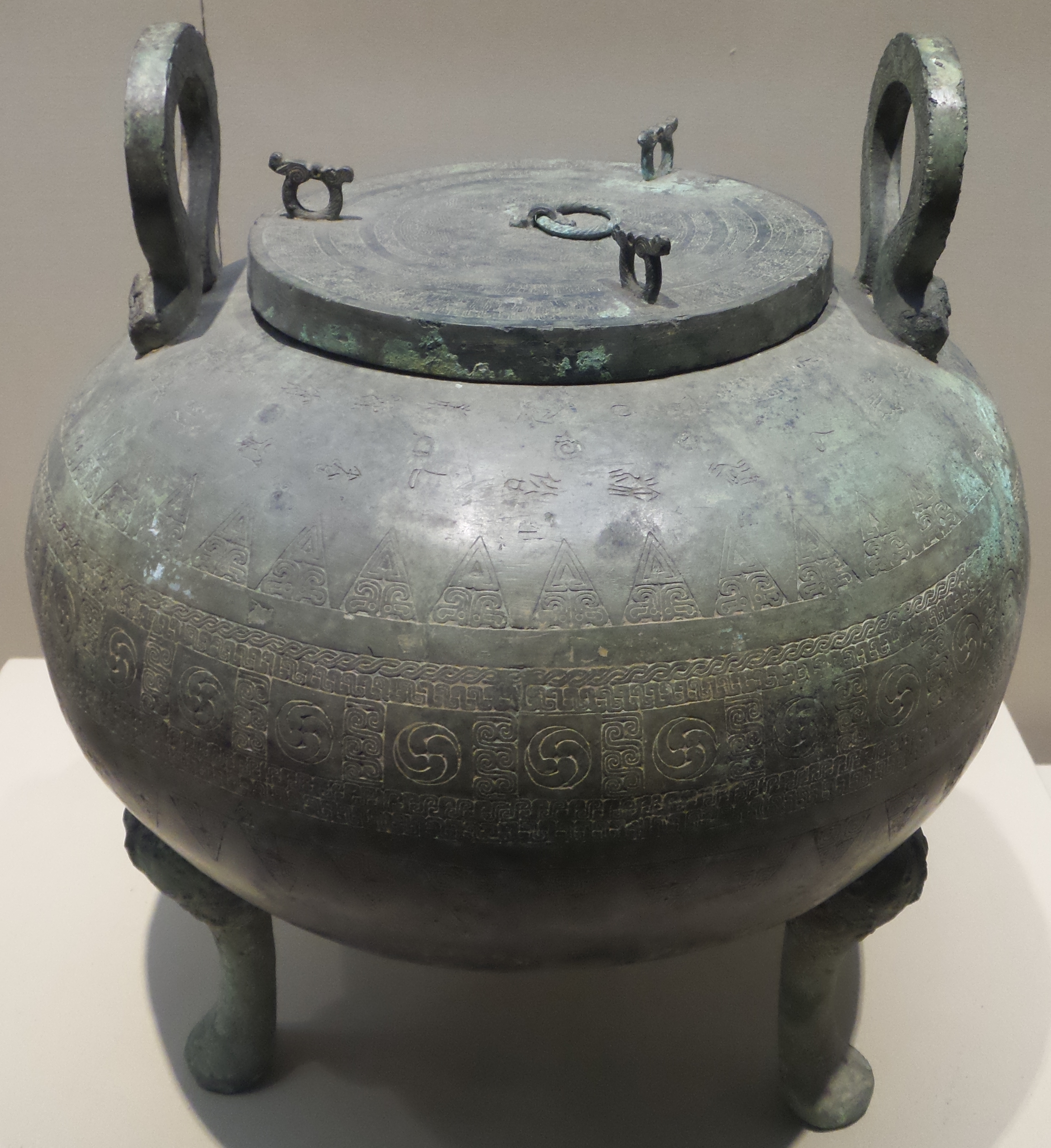
Bronze ding cast by Yin, the yaoyin (official in charge of sacrifice) of Xu, who was exiled in the Yue kingdom, unearthed in Shaoxing, 1982. Its 44-character inscription records Yin's ambition to restore the vanquished Xu kingdom.

After Xu's fall, Zhangyu, his family and his most loyal officers were allowed to go into exile to Chu. On the way, they met Chu's army and were escorted to the city of Yi, where Zhangyu took residence. Despite its end, Xu continued to "exert a major influence in the region", especially since exiles from the fallen state settled in a large area. Bronze artifacts inscribed by Xu donors were found at sites associated with both Yue and Wu, but some were even found at Jing'an in northwestern Jiangxi, an area commonly considered a "virtual no-man's land inhabited by unassimilated populations".

Those found at Wu sites and dated to the time after Xu's destruction were probably war booty, trading goods or "tokens of political or marriage alliance". The Xu bronzes from Shaoxing in the Yue kingdom, however, can reliably identified with exiles. Its donor, Yin, had been the yaoyin (official in charge of sacrifice) of Xu, and stated on one ding his ambitions to restore his home state. An inscription on a halberd of a king of Yue is even interpreted by some scholars as "to aid the Xu state", in which case the Yue government itself desired the restoration of Xu. This interpretation is, however, strongly disputed, with many scholars such as Peng Yushang reading the words as the name of a king.

== Culture ==
While contemporary and later written records generally considered the people of Xu to be part of the "Huaiyi" or "barbarians of the Huai River", it remains unclear if the Huaiyi were defined on their political opposition to the Zhou dynasty or a shared culture and common ethnicity. Nevertheless, several sinologists, such as Donald B. Wagner, Constance A. Cook, and Barry B. Blakeley consider it likely that the Huaiyi were a specific people, distinct from other groups such as the Dongyi of Shandong and the Nanyi of the middle Yangtze. (Note: In contrast, researcher Li Baifeng argued, purely based on the literary records, that the Xu people were not related to the Huaiyi, but "Chinese" who had migrated to the south and later formed the states of Wu and Yue. Donald B. Wagner stated that this interpretation is completely speculative.) Archaeological excavations seem to corroborate this assumption, as they indicate that the Xu peoples had a distinct indigenous culture which had evolved from local Neolithic origins. As part of the Huaiyi, the Xu peoples were part of a highly developed bronze culture. In fact, the Huaiyi appeared as users of bronze and copper who produced metal weapons, vessels and bells since they were first attested by Zhou sources in the eleventh century BC.

Xu is also commonly associated with the larger Wu-Yue cultural area, on which it exerted a great influence. In this position it acted as an intermediary for the northern Zhou culture, but also conveyed its own distinct techniques and ideas to the Yangtze delta region.

=== Settlement and tombs ===
The capital of Xu was located in Sihong County, while modern-day Pizhou served as its main ritual center and necropolis for its rulers. Researcher He Yun'ao has argued that Xu tombs were typically located on high mounds.

=== Language ===
As the people of Xu were not of Shang or Zhou origin, they probably spoke their own language, which might have been related to the largely unknown Yue languages to the south. Nevertheless, the Xu elites were well versed in Old Chinese, the lingua franca of the time, using it to inscribe their bronze vessels. Besides Old Chinese script, the bird seal script was also used. This script was very popular in southeastern China and had evolved from the seal script of the Shang dynasty. Still not completely deciphered, it remains unclear if it was a full-fledged writing system or had a more symbolic purpose. Historian Erica Fox Brindley speculates that texts were only written in Old Chinese regardless of the script.

== Rulers ==
Xu was ruled by a branch of the Ying family (嬴) that also controlled the states of Zhongli, Ju, and Tan. The Records of the Grand Historian and other sources claimed that the clan was related to the royal family of Qin, a polity located far in the west.

The rulers of Xu had already assumed the title of king during the Western Zhou period, and Zhou sources consequently called them zǐ (子). This title was used by the Zhou states of the Spring and Autumn period to refer to "inferior" barbarian rulers, and is commonly translated as "viscount". Despite this, "zǐ" originated as Western Zhou description for foreign rulers who saw themselves as independent kings. As result, when many Dongyi, Huaiyi and Man rulers such as the sovereigns of Xu adopted the "zǐ" title, they took it as synonymous with "king". Some later Xu rulers, including Ziyou and Yichu, also assumed the title of "wang" (王) that was associated with the Zhou dynasty's kingship.

Name	Period of reign	Notes
Yan	fl. 944 BC	ruled most of the Huai River valley, invaded the Zhou dynasty's realm
Liang	Middle Spring and Autumn period	
Geng	Middle Spring and Autumn period	
Ziyou	Late Spring and Autumn period	
Yichu	fl. 535 BC	arrested by Chu, but escaped to Wu; subsequently caused a war between Chu and Wu
Zhangyu	?–512 BC	last ruler of Xu

== Xu in astronomy ==
Xu is represented with the star Theta Serpentis in asterism Left Wall, Heavenly Market enclosure (see Chinese constellation).

== See also ==
- Dongyi
- Dapeng (state)
- Gumie (state)
