= Liuqiu (medieval) =

Historical realm

- Chinese: 流求 琉求 琉球 留求 瑠求
Transcriptions
Standard Mandarin
- Hanyu Pinyin: Liúqiú
- Wade–Giles: Liu-chʻiu
- Tongyong Pinyin: Lióucióu

Liuqiu or Lewchew was a realm said to have existed in the East China Sea. During the 18th and 19th centuries, it was referred to as Liukiu in English; and, Lieou-kieou in French. Referenced in various historical Chinese texts such as the Book of Sui, it is variously identified with Taiwan Island, the Penghu Islands (Pescadore Islands), and the Ryukyu Islands.

== Book of Sui ==
A detailed description of an island kingdom called "Liuqiu" may be found in the Book of Sui. Chinese Liuqiu was first attested in the Book of Sui (636), which stated that Sui China had sent expeditions to what it called Liuqiu (流求) three times in 607 and 608. The Book of Sui places the report on Liuqiu second to last within the chapter on "Eastern Barbarians" (Dongyi), following the report on Mohe and preceding the report on Wa (Japan). The text describes the territory of Liuqiu and its people as follows:

"The country of Liuqiu is situated amidst islands in the sea, in a location that should be east of Jian'an County, (Note: Chinese: 建安郡; pinyin: Jiàn'ān-jùn, now Jian'ou, Nanping, Fujian, China) to which one may arrive with five days' travel by water. The land has many caves. (Note: Alternatively, "The land has many mountains and caves" or "The land has many mountain caves.") Its king's clan name is Huansi, and his given name is Keladou; it is not known how many generations have passed since he and his have come to possess the country. The people of that land call him Kelaoyang, and for his wife, [they] say Duobatu. His place of residence they call Boluotan Grotto, with threefold moats and fences; the perimeter has flowing water, trees and briars as barriers. As for the domicile of the king, it is sixteen rooms large, and engraved with carvings of birds and beasts. There are many Doulou trees, which resemble the orange but with foliage that is dense. The country has four or five chiefs, who unite several villages under their rule; the villages have [their own] little kings."

"The people have deep eyes and long noses, seeming to be rather akin to the Hu, and also having petty cleverness. There is no observance of hierarchy of ruler and minister nor the rite of prostrating oneself with one's palms pressed together. Fathers and children sleep together in the same bed. The men pluck out their whiskers and beards, and any place on their bodies where they happen to have hair, they will also remove it. The adult women use ink to tattoo their hands in the design of insects and serpents. As for marriage, they use wine, delicacies, pearls and shells to arrange a betrothal; if a man and a woman have found pleasure in each other, then they get married."

Zhu Kuan, the leader of the first Sui expeditions to "Liuqiu", originally wrote the name with the characters 流虬 or "flowing dragon" because the shape of the island reminded him of a dragon floating on the sea. While Okinawa is a long and thin island that later commentators also associated with a dragon, Taiwan is an oval-shaped island rather than dragon-shaped.

== Identification ==
There is no scholarly consensus on what specific territory "Liuqiu" refers to in the Book of Sui and History of Yuan. Chang Biyu notes that "Some scholars believe that the record of 'Liuqiu' referred to the Liuqiu Island near Taiwan, while some say it was a reference to what are now the Ryukyu Islands ... and others suggest that it was a general term referring to islands in the East China Sea and nearby waters".

In Japanese and Western scholarship, however, it is often assumed that the Book of Sui referred directly to what would later become the Ryukyu Kingdom.

In his Daoyi Zhilüe (1349), Wang Dayuan clearly used "Liuqiu" as a name for Taiwan or the part of it near to Penghu. Chinese records written during the Mongol Yuan dynasty suggested that Liuqiu was Taiwan. For example, the Wenxian Tongkao (1317) stated that Liuqiu was located to the east of Quanzhou, a port city facing the Taiwan Strait, and was visible from the Penghu Islands in the middle of the strait. Similarly, the History of Yuan (1369), which was compiled by the succeeding Ming dynasty, reinforces the identification of Liuqiu as Taiwan. According to the book, the Mongols tried in vain to subjugate what it called Liuqiu (瑠求) twice in 1292 and 1297. The Penghu Islands and Liuqiu faced each other and the envoys of 1292 visited Penghu en route to Liuqiu. The fact that the Chinese characters assigned to Liuqiu have changed over time (流求, 留仇, 流虬, 瑠求, 琉球, etc.) indicates that it was borrowed from some non-Chinese language. However, the Okinawan language's form of the word, Ruuchuu (ルーチュー), is unlikely to be the origin of the word as the prohibition of word-initial /r/ is an areal feature of Okinawan and related languages. Hence, most scholars seek its etymological root in Austronesian languages of Taiwan.

== Legacy ==
In later works, the name refers to the Ryukyu Islands in general or Okinawa, the largest of them. The Ming emperor's letter to Okinawa in 1372 announcing the formation of his new dynasty addressed Okinawa as the "country of Liu-qiu." After Shō Hashi unified the three kingdoms on Okinawa, the Xuande Emperor gave him the title "King of Liuqiu" in 1428. While this small independent monarchy of seafaring traders was similar to the settlements found in Japan's southern islands, its culture was more strongly influenced by the mainland Chinese. Indeed, the name "Ryukyu" is simply the Japanese form of Liúqiú. Early modern Chinese sources also specifically called Okinawa (the largest of the Ryukyus) as "Greater Liuqiu" and Taiwan Island as the "Lesser Liuqiu". In the 18th century Liuqui Guo Zhilue, it was identified as Ryukyu with specific reference to an island of Gumishan (Kume Island) ruled by a Gumi chief. This text also described this area around 1644 as under strict control of the Japanese shogunate - which is true for the Ryukyu Kingdom (See Invasion of Ryukyu). The word remained alien to the Okinawans; that no instance of it can be found in the ritual songs in the 22 volumes of the Omoro Sōshi, which reflects the Okinawan world-view.

The name Liuqiu, in intermittent use since the Ming Dynasty, also remains the official name for Xiaoliuqiu Island southwest of Taiwan. There are sources that refer to Xiaoliuqiu (little Liuqiu) as the old Chinese name for Taiwan.

== See also ==
- Names of Ryukyu
- Early Chinese contact with Taiwan
