= Yuanhe Xingzuan =

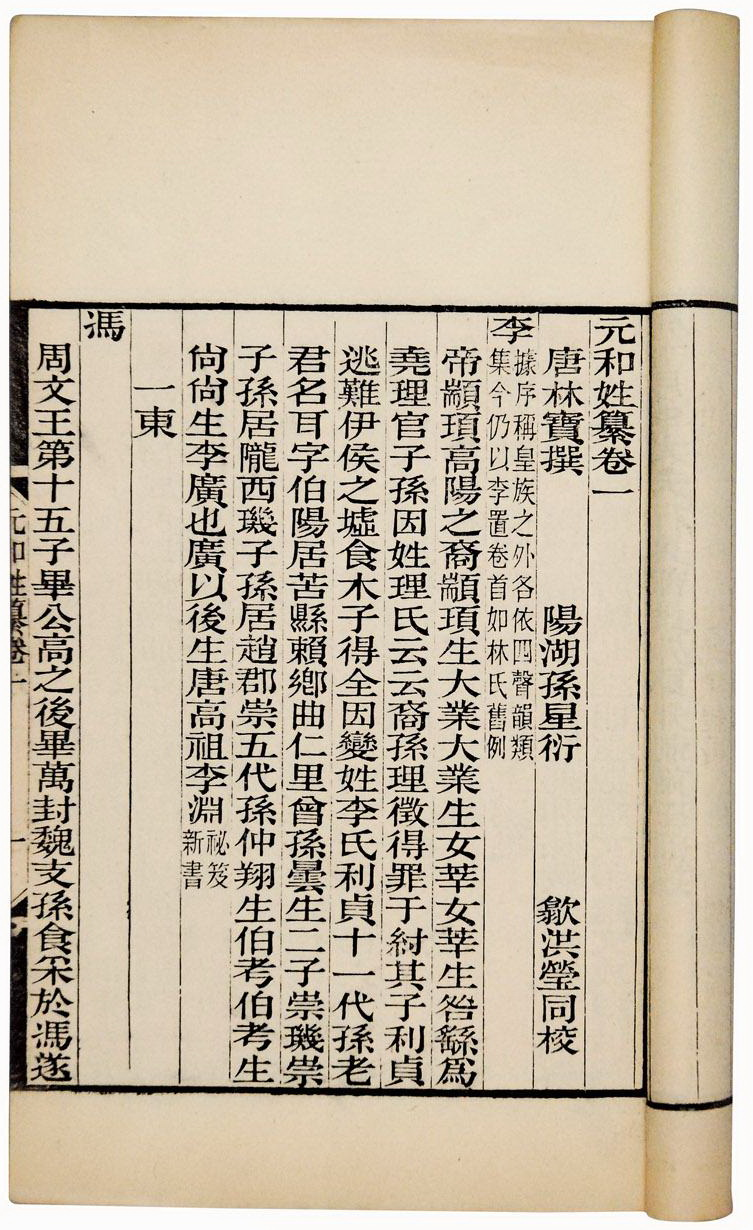
- The first page of Volume 1 of Yuanhe Xingzhuan
- Author: Lin Bao
- Original title: 元和姓纂
- Language: Classical Chinese
- Subject: Chinese surnames and genealogy
- Publication date: 812
- Publication place: Tang dynasty China

The Yuanhe Xingzuan (Chinese: 元和姓纂; lit. 'Register of surnames of the Yuanhe reign') is an imperial Tang dynasty register of the genealogies of China's prominent families. It was compiled by Lin Bao (林寶), on the order of Emperor Xianzong (reigned 805–820), whose era name was Yuanhe. The book was completed in 812 and records 1,232 surnames.

The Yuanhe Xingzuan contains the register of the most prominent families of the time, starting with Li 李, the imperial family. The other families are arranged according to the phonetic system of the Guangyun dictionary. The main sources are private genealogy books and not necessarily reliable historical facts. It also quotes from many older texts including Shiben, Fengsu Tongyi, Zuxingji (族姓記), Sanfu Juelu (三輔決錄), Baijiapu (百家譜), Yingxian Zhuan (英賢傳), Xingyuan Yunpu (姓源韻譜), and Xing Yuan (姓苑).

The original book was lost during the Song dynasty, but Qing dynasty scholars Sun Xingyan (孫星衍) and Hong Ying (洪瑩) collected quotations from the Ming dynasty encyclopedia Yongle Dadian and the Song dynasty book Gujin Xingshi Shu Bianzheng (古今姓世書辨證), and compiled them into an 18-volume version which is included in the Qing official encyclopedia Siku Quanshu.

== See also ==
- Yuanhe Maps and Records of Prefectures and Counties
