= Dapeng (state) =

Chinese Bronze Age state

Dapeng 大彭
- Unknown–c. 1060 BC
- Capital: Qiuwan, Tongshan District
- Religion: Sheji worship
- Government: Monarchy
- Marquis?
- Historical era: Chinese Bronze Age
  - Established: Unknown
  - War against Wu Ding: c. 1200 BC
  - Conquered by Shang dynasty: c. 1060 BC
Succeeded by
Shang dynasty; Xu (state)
- Today part of: China

Dapeng or Great Peng (Chinese: 大彭), also known simply as Peng, was a Chinese Bronze Age state that was centered at Xuzhou and Qiuwan (Tongshan District) in northern Jiangsu. First mentioned on oracle bones dating to the early 11th century BC, Dapeng was a contemporary of the late Shang dynasty, with whom it shared an ambiguous relationship. At times, the two polities were allies and trading partners, but on at least two occasions war broke out between them, eventually leading to Dapeng's destruction by King Di Xin of Shang around 1060 BC.

== History ==
According to the Spring and Autumn period's Guoyu (Discourses of the States), the Han dynasty's Shiben (Genealogy), and the Tang dynasty's Kuodi Zhi (Record of Geography), Dapeng was founded by Peng Zu (lit. "Ancestor of Peng"), who was made a marquis by the kings of the Shang dynasty. After his death, the state declined under his descendants. Due to the lack of contemporary written sources, it remains impossible to verify this information. Archaeological excavations at Qiuwan, likely the kingdom's capital, have shown that the state was under strong Shang influence since the early Yinxu period (c.1400 BC). According to the Warring States period's Yu Gong, the whole Xuzhou area, including Dapeng, regularly sent tribute to the Shang centres in the Central Plain. Major tributary goods included pearls, shells, and rare woods. Archaeological findings seem to corroborate these records, as large quantities of shells have been uncovered from Qiuwan, and the Xuzhou area appears to have served as a major trading hub since the 3rd millennium BC.

Under the rule of King Wu Ding (1250–1192 BC), hostilities broke out, and the Shang dynasty possibly invaded Dapeng. According to Sima Qian, Dapeng and its ruling dynasty were eventually destroyed by the Shang royal army in the 11th century BC due to the "unjust behaviour" of Peng Zu's successors. Modern historians such as Chen Mengjia, Li Xueqin, and Shima Kunio believed that this campaign against Dapeng is likely related to King Di Xin's military expedition into the Huai River valley that was recorded on oracle bones. A few decades after the destruction of Dapeng and the abandonment of Qiuwan, the state of Xu emerged in its immediate vicinity. It remains unknown if there was any relation between these two polities.

== Religion ==
The people of Dapeng, influenced by both Shang as well as local traditions, probably practiced human sacrifice. At Qiuwan a sacrificial altar was found, consisting of a one meter high natural stone, surrounded by three large, erected stones. Around these stones, 22 human and 10 dog skeletons were found; most humans were executed by blows to the head. Twenty were then buried in a crouched position, the head to the ground with their arms tied behind their backs. The other two were only represented by their skulls. The remains dated from 1400 to 1000 BC, indicating that the site was used for a long time.

The excavators interpreted the findings as sacrifices to the Sheji, God of Earth, who was symbolized by standing rocks, prayed to for a good harvest, and whose cult was prevalent among the eastern tribes as well as the Shang people.

== See also ==
- Dongyi
- Xu (state)
- Gumie (state)

== Bibliography ==
- Wu, Hung (1990). "The Art of Xuzhou: A Regional Approach" (PDF). Orientations. 21. Hong Kong: 40–59. Archived from the original (PDF) on 2013-08-29.
- Higham, Charles (2004). Encyclopedia of Ancient Asian Civilizations. New York City: Infobase Publishing. ISBN 0-8160-4640-9.
- Lu, Liancheng; Yan, Wenming (2002). "Society during the Three Dynasties". In Chang Kwang-chih; Xu Pingfang; Sarah Allan (eds.). The Formation of Chinese Civilization: An Archaeological Perspective. New Haven, Connecticut: Yale University Press, New World Press. pp. 141–202. ISBN 978-0300093827.
- Kominami, Ichiro (2009). "Rituals for the Earth". In John Lagerwey; Marc Kalinowski (eds.). Early Chinese Religion: Part One: Shang Through Han (1250 BC-220 AD). Leiden: Brill Publishers. pp. 201–236.
- Liu, Li; Chen, Xingcan (2012). The Archaeology of China: From the Late Paleolithic to the Early Bronze Age. Cambridge: Cambridge University Press. ISBN 978-0-521-64432-7.
- Song, Yaoliang (2015). Benjamin Alexander (ed.). The Deified Human Face Petroglyphs of Prehistoric China. New York City: SCPG Publishing Corporation. ISBN 978-1-938368-34-9.
- Li, Feng (2006). Landscape and Power in Early China: The Crisis and Fall of the Western Zhou 1045–771 BC. Cambridge: Cambridge University Press. ISBN 978-0-521-85272-2.
