= Kuodi Zhi =

7th-century survey of China by Li Tai

- Author: Li Tai
- Original title: 括地志
- Language: Classical Chinese
- Subject: Geography and administrative divisions of Tang China
- Publication date: 641/642
- Publication place: Tang China

Kuodi Zhi (Chinese: 括地志), usually translated as Comprehensive Gazetteer or Description Encompassing the Earth, is an early Tang dynasty survey of Tang China's geography and administrative divisions. It was compiled by Li Tai, Prince of Wei, a son of Emperor Taizong, with the help of imperial scholars including Xiao Deyan (萧德言). It was completed in 641/642 AD.

The original work comprised 555 volumes, with 550 volumes of text and 5 volumes of preface, but most have been lost. During the Qing dynasty, scholar Sun Xingyan (孙星衍) published the 8-volume book Kuodi Zhi jiben (括地志辑本), a collection of the surviving fragments. In 1974, Wang Hui (王恢) published a revised and expanded version of Sun's work entitled Kuodi Zhi xinji (括地志新辑). In 1980, He Cijun (贺次君) published Kuodi Zhi jijiao (括地志辑校).

== See also ==
- Yuanhe Maps and Records of Prefectures and Counties
