= Xǔ (state) =

Zhou dynasty Chinese state (c. 1064 BC–375 BC)

State of Xu 許國
- c. 1064 BC–375 BC
- Common languages: Old Chinese
- Government: Monarchy
- History
  - Established: c. 1064 BC
  - Conquered by Chu: 375 BC
Succeeded by
Chu (state)
- Today part of: China

Xu (Chinese: 許; pinyin: Xǔ) was an ancient Chinese state of the Zhou dynasty. In the early Western Zhou Dynasty, King Cheng of Zhou enfeoffed Xu Wenshu at Xu (modern Xuchang, Henan). The ruling family had the clan name of Jiang (姜), and the noble rank of baron (男).

== History ==
=== Western Zhou Dynasty ===
In the early years of King Wu of Zhou, the capital of Xu was established at Zhangpan Ancient City, 20 kilometers east of modern Xuchang City.

=== Eastern Zhou Dynasty ===
In 654 BC, Chu attacked Xu, and the ruler of Xu submitted to Chu.

In 576 BC, Duke Ling of Xu was afraid of Zheng's aggression and requested to move to Chu. Chu moved the Xu court to Ye ( in modern Ye County, Henan).

In 533 BC, Duke Dao of Xu moved to Chengfu, in modern Anhui Province.

In 506 BC, Si, Baron of Xu moved to Rongcheng (in modern Lushan County, Henan).

In 504 BC, the state of Zheng onset of action Xu, hold Baron Si.

In 375 BC, Xu was annexed by Chu.

== Culture ==
The wife of Duke Mu of Xu, Lady Xu Mu, is said to be the first known woman poet in Chinese history.

== Sources ==
- Ancient and Early Medieval Chinese Literature (vol.3 & 4): A Reference Guide, Part Three & Four. 2014.
