= Dongyi =

Groups of peoples in ancient China

- Zhou geography: Huaxia surrounded by the Four Barbarians—Dongyi in the east, Nanman in the south, Xirong in the west, and Beidi in the north.
- Traditional Chinese: 東夷
- Simplified Chinese: 东夷
- Literal meaning: Eastern Barbarians
Transcriptions
Standard Mandarin
- Hanyu Pinyin: Dōngyí
- Wade–Giles: Tung-i
- IPA: [tʊ́ŋ.ǐ]
Yue: Cantonese
- Jyutping: dung^{1} ji^{4}
Middle Chinese
- Middle Chinese: /tuŋ jiɪ/
Old Chinese
- Zhengzhang: /*toːŋ lil/

The Dongyi or Eastern Yi (Chinese: 東夷; pinyin: Dōngyí) was a collective term for ancient peoples found in Chinese records. The definition of Dongyi varied across the ages, but in most cases referred to inhabitants of eastern China, then later, the Korean peninsula and Japanese Archipelago. Dongyi refers to different group of people in different periods. As such, the name "Yí" (夷) was something of a catch-all and was applied to different groups over time. According to the earliest Chinese record, the Zuo Zhuan, the Shang dynasty was attacked by King Wu of Zhou while attacking the Dongyi and collapsed afterward.

== Ancient inhabitants of eastern China ==
Oracle bone inscriptions from the early 11th century BCE refer to campaigns by the late Shang king Di Yi against the Rénfāng (人方), a group occupying the area of southern Shandong and Jianghuai (northern Anhui and Jiangsu). Many Chinese archaeologists apply the historical name "Dongyi" to the Rénfāng, as well as the archaeological Yueshi culture (1900–1500 BCE). Other scholars, such as Fang Hui, consider this identification problematic because of the high frequency of migrations in prehistoric populations of the region.

== Yi (夷) ==
The Chinese word yí in Dōngyí has a long history and complex semantics.

=== Characters ===
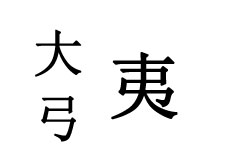
The Chinese character Yi 夷 consists of 大 "big" and 弓 "bow".

The modern Chinese regular script character 夷 for yí combines radicals (recurring character elements) da 大 "big" and gong 弓 "bow", which are also seen in the seal script. However, yí was written in the earlier bronze script as a person wrapped with something, and in the earliest oracle bone script as a person with a bent back and legs.

The (121 CE) Shuowen Jiezi character dictionary, defines yí 夷 as "people of the east, big 大 bow 弓" (東方之人也從大從弓). Elsewhere in the Shuowen Jiezi, under the entry of qiang 羌, the term yí is associated with benevolence and human longevity. Yí countries are therefore virtuous places where people live long lives. This is why Confucius wanted to go to yí countries when the dao could not be realized in the central states.

The scholar Léon Wieger provided multiple definitions to the term yí: "The men 大 armed with bows 弓, the primitive inhabitants, barbarians, borderers of the Eastern Sea, inhabitants of the South-West countries."

Bernhard Karlgren says that in the bronze script for yí inscribed on Zhou dynasty (c. 1045 BCE – c. 256 BCE) Chinese bronze inscriptions, "The graph has 'man' and 'arrow', or 'arrow' with something wound around the shaft."

The Yi, or Dongyi, are associated with the bow and arrow: K. C. Wu says the modern character 夷 designating the historical "Yí peoples", is composed of the characters for 大 "big (person)" and 弓 "bow"; which implies a big person carrying a bow, and also that this old form of this Chinese Character was composed with an association of a particular group of people with the use of the bow in mind. Some classic Chinese history records like Zuo Zhuan, Shuowen Jiezi, Classic of Rites, all have some similar records about this.

The earliest records of yi were inscribed on oracle bones dating from the late Shang dynasty (c. 1600 – c. 1046 BCE). This oracle bone script was used interchangeably for yí 夷, rén 人 "human", and shī 尸 "corpse; personator of the dead; inactive; lay out". The archeologist and scholar Guo Moruo believed the oracle graph for yi denotes "a dead body, i.e., the killed enemy", while the bronze graph denotes "a man bound by a rope, i.e., a prisoner or slave". The historical linguist Xu Zhongshu explains this oracle character depicts either a "corpse"' with two bent legs or a "barbarian" custom of sitting with one's legs stretched out instead of the Chinese norm of squatting on one's heels. The early China historian Li Feng says the Western Zhou bronze graph for Yí was "differentiated from rén 人 (human) by its kneeling gesture, clearly implying a population that was deemed a potential source of slaves or servants", thus meaning "foreign conquerable". Axel Schuessler hypothesizes an Old Chinese etymological development from *li 夷 "extend; expose; display; set out; spread out" to *lhi 尸 "to spread out; lie down flat (in order to sleep); motionless; to set forth (sacrificial dishes)", to "personator of a dead ancestor", and to "corpse".

=== Etymology and linguistic classification ===
Historical linguists have tentatively reconstructed its ancient pronunciations and etymology. The Modern Standard Chinese pronunciation yí descends from (c. 6th–9th centuries CE) Middle Chinese and (c. 6th–3rd centuries BCE) Old Chinese. Middle and Old Chinese reconstructions of yí 夷 "barbarian; spread out" include i < *djər, yij < *ljɨj, jiɪ < *lil, and ji < *ləi. As to the most recent reconstruction, William H. Baxter and Laurent Sagart (2014) reconstruct the Old Chinese name of yí 夷 as *ləj.

As Yuèjuèshū (越絕書) states that the Yue word for "sea" is also 夷 (*li → yí), Sinologist Axel Schuessler proposes an Austroasiatic etymology for the ethnonym *li by comparing to Khmer ទន្លេ dnle "sea", from Pre-Angkorian Old Khmer ទន្លេ danle(y) "large expanse of water"; thus, the ethnonym might have referred to a people living by the sea. When analyzing possible Austroasiatic loanwords into Old Chinese, Schuessler noticed that one layer of loanwords—those from one or more Austroasiatic language(s) into Old Chinese spoken in the Yellow River basin—showed affinities to modern Khmeric and Khmuic languages, and occasionally to Monic. Earlier, Edwin G. Pulleyblank (1983, 1999) also proposed that the Yi were Austroasiatic speakers. Laurent Sagart (2008) instead suggested that the Yi languages were ancestral to Austronesian languages and formed a sister-group to Sino-Tibetan. However, no such macrofamily consisting of Sino-Tibetan and Austronesian has been accepted in mainstream comparative linguistics.

=== Usages ===
The sinologist Edwin G. Pulleyblank describes how Yi usages semantically changed. "Their name furnished the primary Chinese term for 'barbarian' and is sometimes used in such a generalized sense as early as the Spring and Autumn period. At the same time, it continued to have a specific reference, denoting especially the Yi of the Huai River region, who constituted a recognized political entity. Paradoxically the Yi was considered the most 'civilized' of the non-Chinese peoples."

==== Pre-Qin usages ====
Mausoleum of Shaohao in Qufu, Shandong, who came from a Dongyi tribe and was regarded as one of the Three Sovereigns and Five Emperors

It is not easy to determine people's times that a Classical Chinese document reflects.

Literature describing a pre-Xia dynasty period does not use the character Yi. As for the Xià dynasty, some groups of people are referred to as the Yi. For example, the Yu Gong chapter of the Shu Ji or Book of Documents terms people in Qingzhou and Xuzhou Laiyi (萊夷), Yuyi (嵎夷) and Huaiyi (淮夷). Another Yi-related term is Jiu-Yi (九夷), literally Nine Yi, which could have also had the connotation The Numerous Yi or The Many Different Kinds of Yi, and which appears in a passage in The Analects that reads, "The Master (i.e., Confucius) desired to live among the Nine Yi." The term "Dongyi" is not used for this period.

Shang dynasty oracle shell and bone writings record yi but not Dongyi. Shima Kunio's concordance of oracle inscriptions lists twenty occurrences of the script for 夷 or 尸, most frequently (6 times) in the compound zhishi 祉尸 "bless the personator; blessed personator". Michael Carr notes some contexts are ambiguous, but suggests, "Three compounds refer to 'barbarians' (in modern characters, fayi 伐夷 'attack barbarians', zhengyi 征夷 'punish barbarians', and yifang 夷方 'barbarian regions')." Oracle inscriptions record that Shang King Wu Ding (r. c. 1250–1192 BCE) made military expeditions on the Yi, and King Di Xin (r. c. 1075–1046 BCE) waged a massive campaign against the Yifang 夷方 "barbarian regions". It appears that the Yifang (夷方) were the same people as Huaiyi (淮夷 Huai River Yi), Nanhuaiyi (南淮夷 Southern Huai Yi ), Nanyi (南夷 Southern Yi in Yangtze River Delta) and Dongyi (東夷 Eastern Yi / Shandong Yi) according to bronzeware inscriptions of the Western Zhou dynasty. The Zhou dynasty attempted to keep the Yi under its control. The most notable example is the successful campaign against the Huaiyi and the Dongyi led by the Duke of Zhou.

On the other hand, historian Huang Yang notes that in the Shang period, "the term Yi probably did not carry the sense of 'barbarian'. Rather it simply denoted one of the many tribes or regions that were the target of the Shang military campaigns ... Therefore, we see that the Yi might have been a certain tribe or group of people that was neighboring the Shang."

During the Spring and Autumn period, Jin, Zheng, Qi, and Song tried to seize control of the Huai River basin, which the Huaiyi occupied. Still, the region ultimately fell under the influence of Chu to the south. Simultaneously, people in the east and south ceased to be called Dongyi as they founded their own states. These Yifang states included the states of Xu, Lai, Zhongli, Ju and Jiang. The small state of Jie was based around present-day Jiaozhou. The state of Xu occupied large areas of modern Jiangsu and Anhui provinces between the Huai and Yangtze Rivers. Eventually, after warring with Chu and Wu, it was conquered by the State of Wu in 512 BCE. Chu annexed the State of Jiang, destroyed the State of Ju, whose territory was annexed by the State of Qi. Recent archaeological excavations reveal that the State of Xu's presence extended to western Jiangxi in modern Jing'an County. This includes bronzeware inscriptions about the State of Xu and a tomb with many nanmu coffins containing sacrificial female victims. Dongyi customs include burials with many sacrificial victims and veneration of the sun.

References to Dongyi became ideological during the Warring States period, owing to cultural changes in Chinese concepts of Self and Other. When the (c. 4th BCE) Classic of Rites recorded stereotypes about the Siyi "Four Barbarians" (Dongyi, Xirong, Nanman, and Beidi) in the four directions, Dongyi had acquired a clearly pejorative nuance.

The people of those five regions – the Middle states, and the [Rong], [Yi], (and other wild tribes around them) – had all their several natures, which they could not be made to alter. The tribes on the east were called [Yi]. They had their hair unbound and tattooed their bodies. Some of them ate their food without it being cooked. Those on the south were called Man. They tattooed their foreheads and had their feet turned in towards each other. Some of them (also) ate their food without it being cooked. Those on the west were called [Rong]. They had their hair unbound and wore skins. Some of them did not eat grain-food. Those on the north were called [Di]. They wore skins of animals and birds and dwelt in caves. Some of them also did not eat grain-food. The people of the Middle States, and of those [Yi], Man, [Rong], and [Di], all had their dwellings, where they lived at ease; their flavors which they preferred; the clothes suitable for them; their proper implements for use; and their vessels which they prepared in abundance. In those five regions, the people's languages were not mutually intelligible, and their likings and desires were different. To make what was in their minds apprehended, and to communicate their likings and desires, (there were officers) – in the east, called transmitters; in the south, representations; in the west, [Di-dis]; and in the north, interpreters.

==== Post-Qin usages ====
The more "China" expanded, the further east the term "Dongyi" was applied to. The Records of the Grand Historian by Sima Qian uses the term "Manyi" (蠻夷), but not "Dongyi". It puts the section of "Xinanyi (southwestern Yi) liezhuan (biographies)", but not "Dongyi liezhuan" (東夷列傳). The Book of Han does not put this section either but calls a Dongye (濊) chief in the Korean Peninsula as Dongyi. The Book of Later Han puts the section of "Dongyi liezhuan" and covers Buyeo, Yilou, Goguryeo, Eastern Okjeo, Hui, Samhan, and Wa, in other words, eastern Manchuria, Korea, Japan, and some other islands. The Book of Jin positioned Dongyi inside the section of "Siyi" (barbarians in four directions) along with "Xirong", "Nanman", and "Beidi". The Book of Sui, the Book of Tang and the New Book of Tang adopt the section of "Dongyi" and covers eastern Manchuria, Korea, Japan, and, optionally, Sakhalin and Taiwan. During the Song dynasty, the official history books replaced Dongyi with Waiguo (外國) and Waiyi (外夷).

==== Other usage of Dongyi in Chinese history books ====
Records of the Grand Historian and Book of Han
These two history books do not assign many chapters to describe the history of Dongyi. However, it includes the simple description Manchuria, Wiman Joseon and Wa. Wiman fled from the state of Yan to Gojoseon, and he disguised himself as a Gojoseon person. Book of Han uses the same term as Records of the Grand Historian.
Book of the Later Han
This book was written by Fan Ye. This book contains the chapter of 'Dongyi', which describes the history of Manchuria and Korea including Buyeo, Goguryeo, Okjeo, Dongye, and Samhan, and Japan including Wa. Like the Shuowen Jiezi, the Book of the Later Han also describes Dongyi countries as places where benevolence rules and the gentlemen do not die.
Records of Three Kingdoms
This book was written by Chen Shou, and also contains the chapter about 'Dongyi'. The chapter of "Wuwan Xianbei Dongyi" describes the Wuwan tribes, Xianbei tribes, and Dongyi tribes. In the section of Dongyi, this book explains the Manchurian, Korean and Japanese ancient kingdoms. Korean and Manchurian kingdoms include Buyeo, Goguryeo, Okjeo, Dongye, and Samhan. Japanese kingdom includes Wa (Japan).
Book of Jin
This book was written by Fang Xuanling during the Tang dynasty. It has the chapter of 'Four Yi' and describes the Manchurian, Korean, and Japanese history. Manchurian, Korean and Japanese include Buyeo, Mahan confederacy, Jinhan confederacy, Sushen, and Wa (Japan).
Book of Song
This history book describes the history of Liu Song dynasty and contains a simple explanation of the neighboring states. The Chapter of Dongyi of this book describes the ancient history of Manchuria, Korea and Japan such as Goguryeo, Baekje and Wa (Japan).
Book of Qi
The Book of Qi is the history book of Southern Qi. In the 58th volume, the history of Dongyi's history is described, which includes the ancient Manchurian, Korean, and Japanese history such as Goguryeo, Baekje, Gaya and Wa (Japan).
History of Southern Dynasties
This book is about the history of Liu Song, Southern Qi, Liang dynasty, and Chen dynasty and includes the history of Dongyi. In the chapter of Dongyi, this book describes the Manchurian, Korean, and Japanese history such as Goguryeo, Baekje, Silla, Wa (Japan), and so on. This book says that Dongyi's state was Gojoseon while Sima Qian says that Gojoseon people is Manyi.
Book of Sui
The Book of Sui describes the history of the Sui dynasty, and was compiled at Tang dynasty. The chapter of Dongyi's history describes the history of Korean, Manchurian and Japanese such as Goguryeo, Baekje, Silla, Mohe, Liuqiu, and Wa (Japan).

== Ancient states with Dongyi (東夷) and/or Huaiyi (淮夷) ==
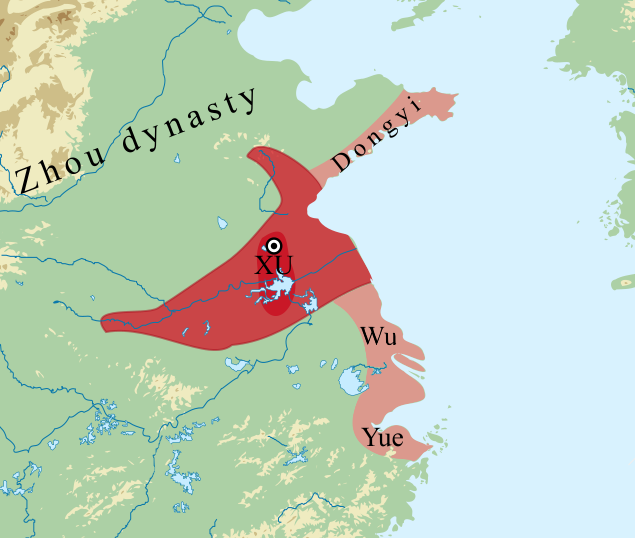
Ancient Xu (徐) state at its greatest extent in the mid 8th century BC. 1) dark red: Xu heartland; 2) red: Xu-led Huaiyi confederation; 3) pink: Xu allies or under Xu influence.

- Dapeng (大彭, ?–1060 BC)
- Tan (譚國, 1046 BC–684 BC)
- Lai (萊國, ?–567 BC)
- Xu (徐國, ?–512 BC)
- Gumie (姑蔑, ?–480 BC)
- Ju (莒國, 1046 BC–431 BC)
- Zou (邹國, 1046 BC–350 BC)

== See also ==
- Four Barbarians, namely Dongyi, Nanman, Xirong and Beidi
- Sinocentrism / Huawaizhidi (化外之地)
- Hua-Yi Distinction
- Shùn
- Mount Penglai (legend originating from historical region ancient Dongyi (東夷) once lived in, especially the port of departure, Penglai, Shandong)
