= Lai (state) =

Lai 萊
- ?–567 BC
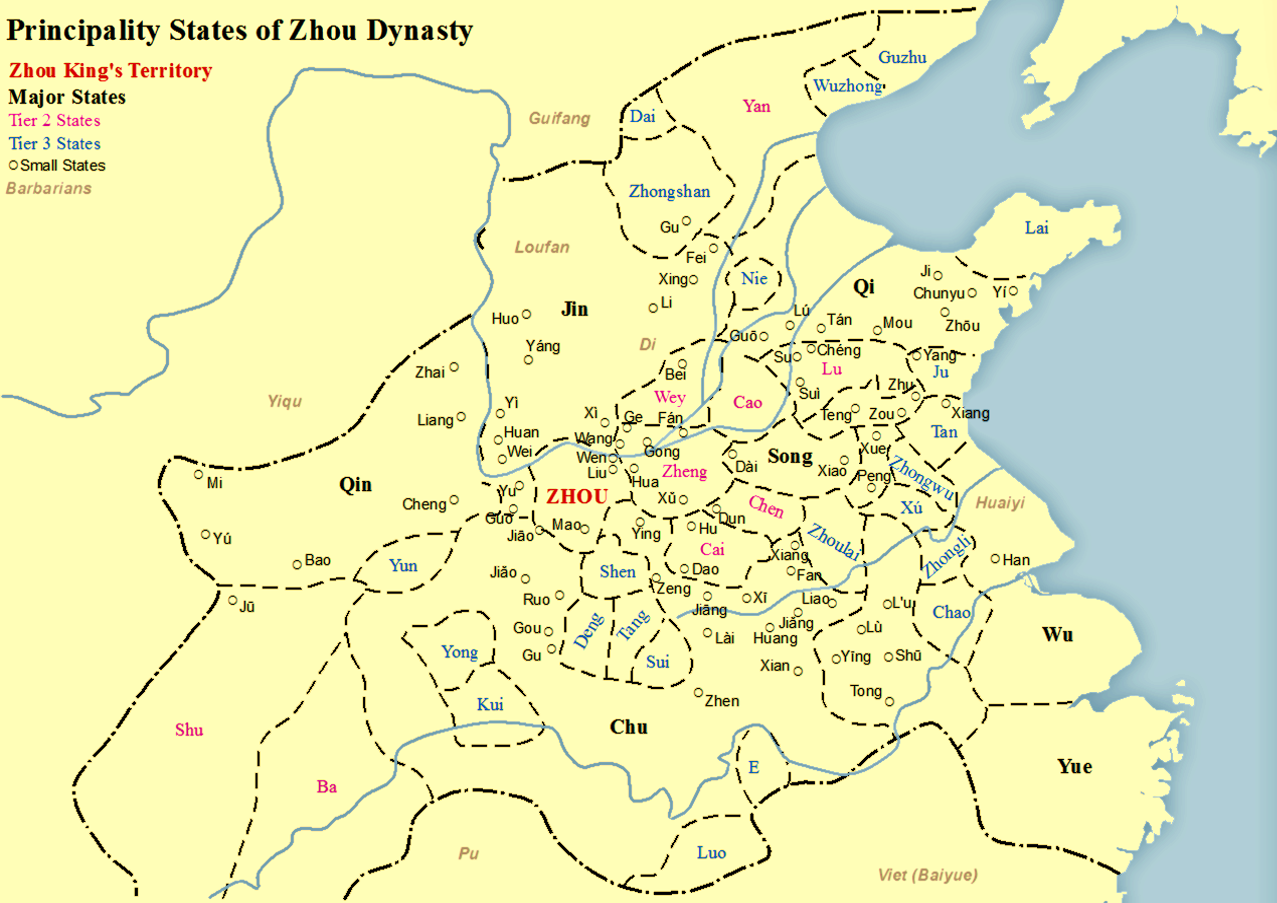
- Lai is on the tip of the Shandong Peninsula bordering Qi
- Capital: Changle (昌樂); Linqu (臨朐); Ni (郳)
- Common languages: Old Chinese
- Government: Monarchy
- Duke of Lai
  - ?–567 BCE: Duke Gong of Lai
- History
  - Established: ?
  - Conquered by Qi: 567 BC
Succeeded by
Qi (state)

Lai (simplified Chinese: 莱; traditional Chinese: 萊; pinyin: Lái), also known as Laiyi (萊夷; Láiyí), was an ancient Dongyi state located in what is now eastern Shandong Province, recorded in the Book of Xia. Tang Shanchun (唐善纯) believes lái means "mountain" in the Old Yue language, while the Yue Jue Shu (越絕書) says lai means "wilderness".

== History ==
Lai (莱) was a traditional enemy of the State of Qi to its west. As soon as Jiang Ziya, the first ruler of Qi, was enfeoffed at Qi, the state of Lai attacked its capital at Yingqiu. In 567 BC, Lai attacked Qi but was decisively defeated by Duke Ling of Qi, and its last ruler Furou, Duke Gong of Lai, was killed. Lai was a large state, and Qi more than doubled in size after annexing Lai. The people (Dongyi) were moved to Laiwu, where Mencius later called them the Qídōng yěrén (齊東野人), the "savages of eastern Qi".

== Rulers of Lai ==
- Furou (浮柔), Duke Gong of Lai (萊共公) ?–567 BC

== See also ==
- Laiwu, Laixi, Laizhou, and Laiyang, places named after Lai people
- Mount Penglai (蓬萊山)
- Penglai Pavilion (蓬萊閣)
- Penglai, Shandong (蓬萊市 / 蓬萊區)
