= Jia'ao =

Xiong Yuan 熊員

King of Chu
- Reign: 544–541 BC
- Predecessor: King Kang
- Successor: King Ling
- Died: 541 BC
- Issue: Xiong Mu (熊幕); Xiong Pingxia (熊平夏)
Names
- Ancestral name: Mǐ (羋); Lineage name: Xióng (熊); Given name: Yuán (員) or Rèn (紝)
- House: Mi
- Dynasty: Chu
- Father: King Kang

Jia'ao (Chinese: 郟敖; pinyin: Jiá'áo), personal name Xiong Yuan, was from 544 BC to 541 BC the king of the Chu state. He succeeded his father, King Kang, as ruler.

Jia'ao's uncle, Xiong Wei, served as his prime minister. In 541 BC when Jia'ao was ill, Xiong Wei murdered him and his two sons, Xiong Mu and Xiong Pingxia, and usurped the throne.

Jia'ao House of Mi Died: 541 BC
Regnal titles
Preceded by King Kang of Chu	King of Chu; 544–541 BC	Succeeded by King Ling of Chu
