= History of Shandong =

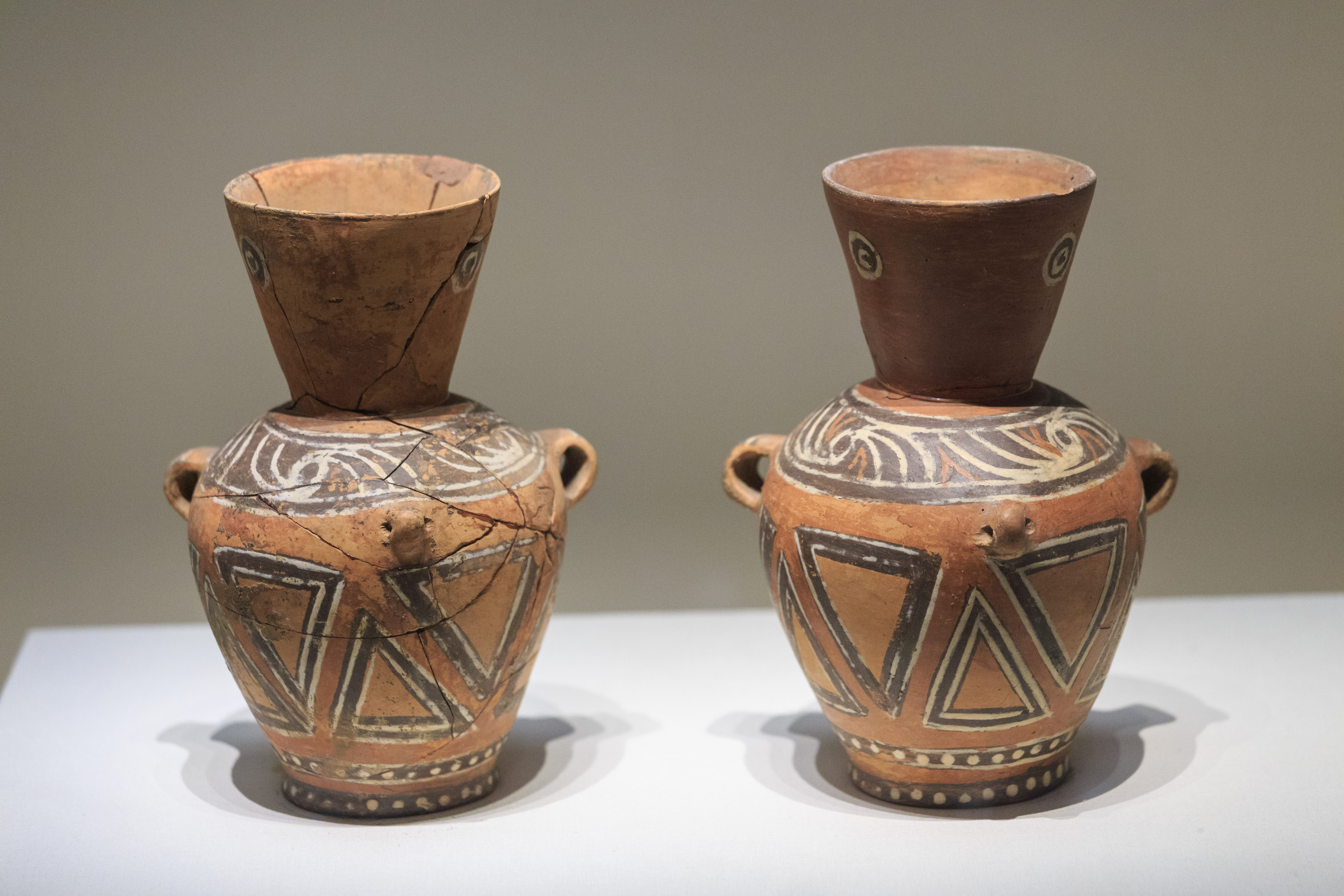
Two painted red jars excavated from Dawenkou site, which existed from 4300 to 2600 BC and centered in today's Shandong area. In those potteries, neolithic signs, which might be related to subsequent scripts, such as those of the Shang dynasty, were found.

Shandong is one of the birthplaces of Chinese civilization. The earliest hominin fossils found in Shandong, those of Yiyuan Man (沂源人), date to about 400,000–500,000 years ago. Excavated sites of the Beixin culture, Dawenkou culture, Longshan culture and other periods show the high level of development of early civilization in the region. During the Yu, Xia and Shang periods, the Dongyi people of Shandong created a brilliant culture and repeatedly clashed and merged with the Xia dynasty. Already in the Xia period the region had entered a slave-owning society, and the Shang tribe, active in Shandong, eventually founded the Shang dynasty. Under the Zhou dynasty, the long rule of fiefdoms such as Qi and Lu made the region's economy and culture among the most advanced of the time. After the unification of China by the Qin dynasty, the history of Shandong became part of the wider history of China.

== Paleolithic to Neolithic ==
=== Paleolithic ===
The fossils of Yiyuan Man (Homo erectus Yiyuanensis), discovered in Yiyuan County (today part of Zibo), are the earliest evidence of human activity yet found in Shandong. Yiyuan Man lived about 400,000–500,000 years ago, in the Paleolithic, during the Middle Pleistocene. At that time Shandong had a warm and humid climate with dense forests and vegetation, and people lived mainly by gathering and hunting. Paleolithic sites and remains have also been found elsewhere in Shandong. Taken together, these finds suggest that in the Early Paleolithic the inhabitants of Shandong spread from the Tai–Yi Mountains to the Yellow Sea coast of southern Shandong, and in the Middle and Late Paleolithic to the Jiaodong Peninsula and the coast of the Bohai Sea.

Around 10,000 years ago, Shandong entered the Mesolithic, the transition between the Paleolithic and the Neolithic. (Note: The Mesolithic in China is also called the microlithic period, characterized mainly by small chipped stone tools.) Mesolithic sites discovered in Shandong are concentrated in the Linyi area of southern Shandong and in the Wen and Si river basins of southwestern Shandong. More than one hundred sites have been found in the Linyi area, including Fenghuangling and Qingfengling in Linyi and Heilongtan and Malingshan in Tancheng; more than forty have been found in the four counties of Wenshang, Yanzhou, Ningyang and Jiaxiang in the Wen–Si basin.

=== Neolithic ===
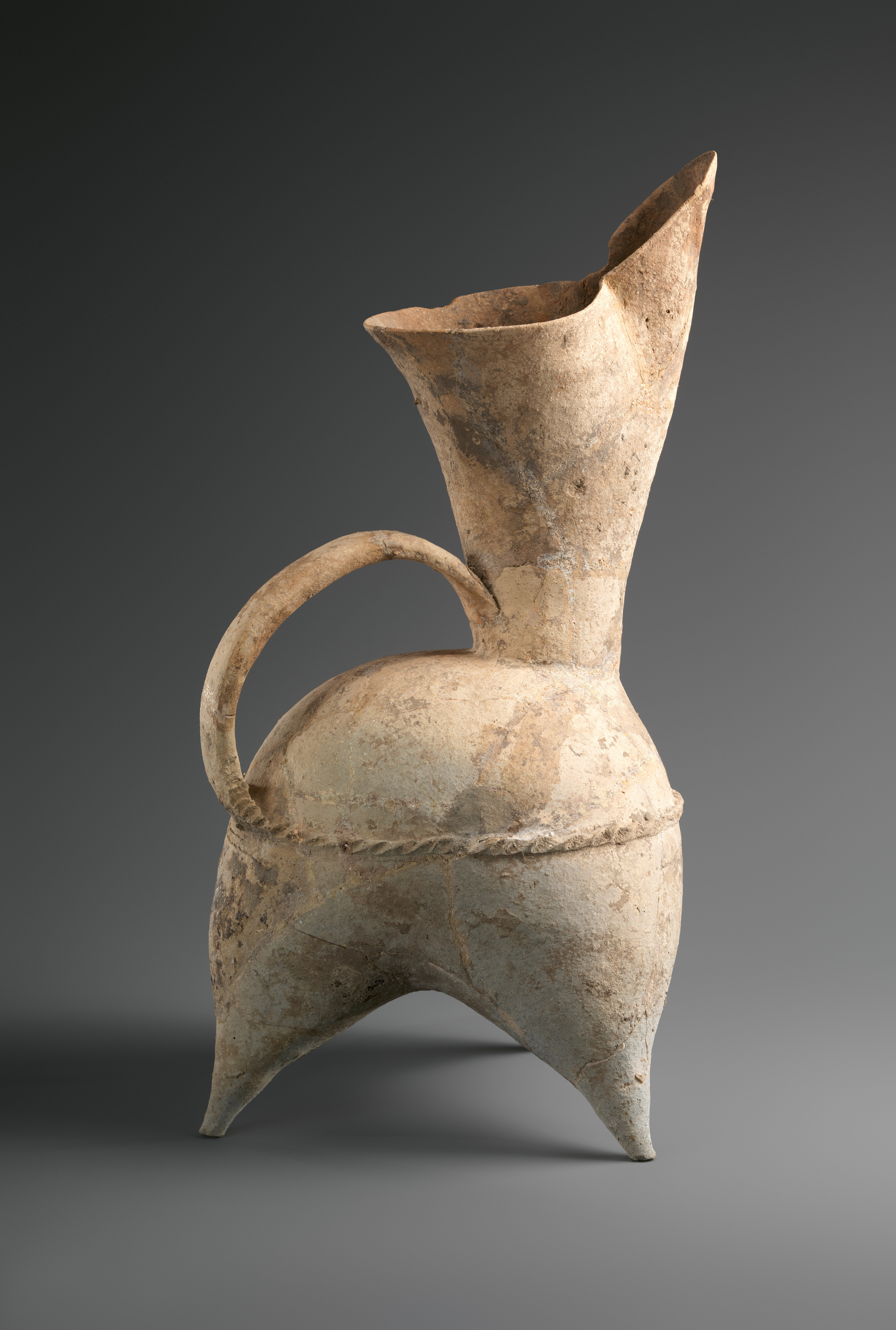
A pottery gui of the Dawenkou culture (Ju County, Linyi)

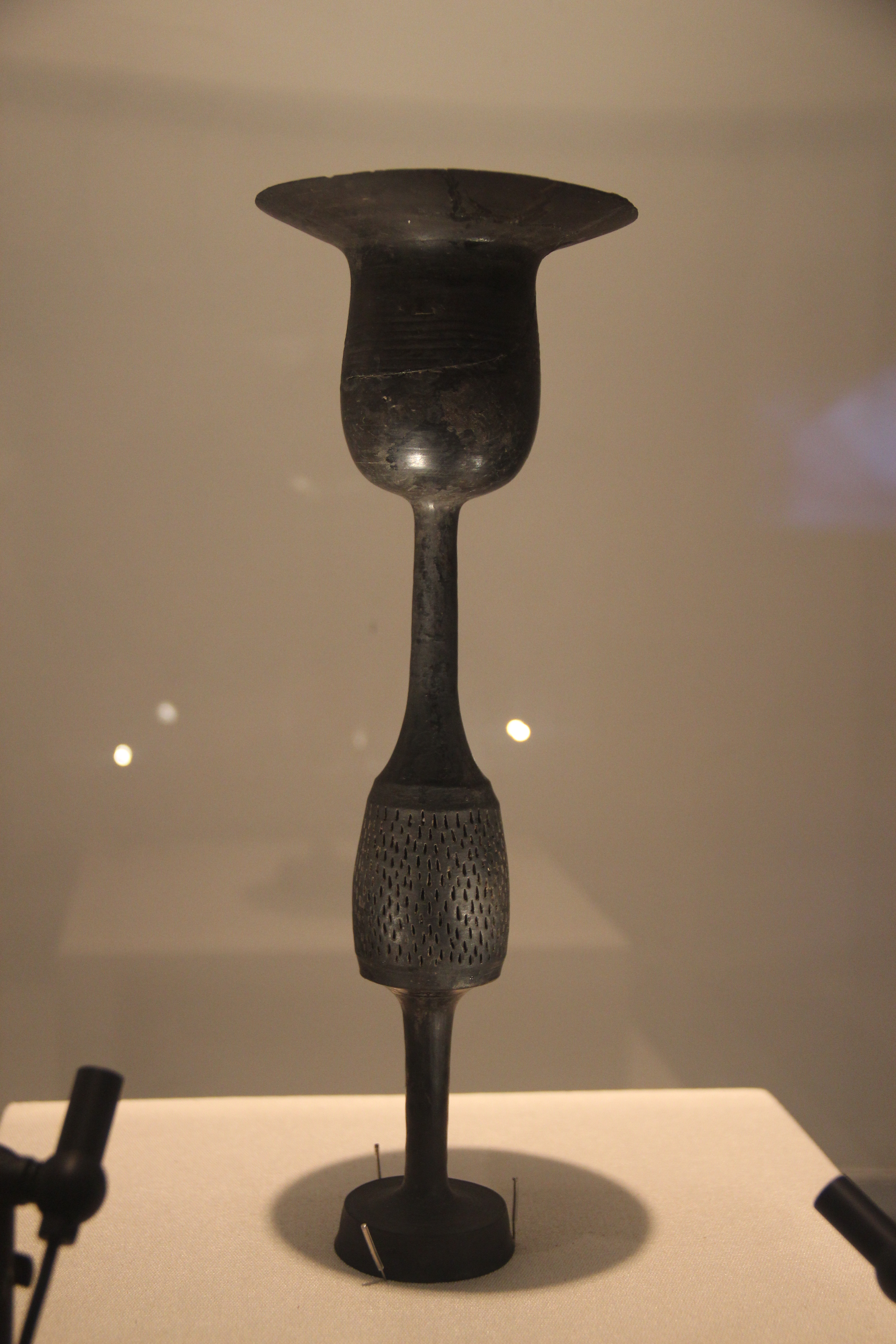
An eggshell-thin black pottery stem cup of the Longshan culture (Zhucheng, Weifang)

Far more Neolithic sites have been found in Shandong than Paleolithic and Mesolithic ones: several thousand sites spread across almost the entire province. The Neolithic in Shandong is divided into the Houli culture (8400–7700 BP), the Beixin culture (c. 7300–6100 BP), the Dawenkou culture (c. 6100–4600 BP), the Longshan culture (c. 4600–4000 BP) and the Yueshi culture (c. 4000–3600 BP). Of these five stages, all except the earliest, the Houli culture (for which no direct stratigraphic superposition beneath the Beixin culture has yet been found), show direct continuity with one another.

- The Houli culture was distributed mainly on the alluvial plain north of the Tai–Yi Mountains and south of the Xiaoqing River.
- Remains of the Beixin culture have been found in Tai'an, Qingdao and Laiwu. Its people lived in matrilineal clans.
- The Dawenkou culture was centered on the Mount Tai area, covering central and southern Shandong and the Huaibei region of northern Jiangsu. Late sites are more widespread, extending from the Yellow Sea coast in the east to eastern Henan in the west, and from the southern shore of the Bohai Sea in the north to Huaibei in the south; remains influenced by the culture have also been found in northern Anhui and central Henan.
- The Longshan culture was the formative period of Chinese bronze culture.
- The Yueshi culture was centered on the Tai–Yi Mountains. It extended from northern Shandong and central Hebei in the north to beyond the Huai River in the south, and from the westernmost part of Shandong and the line of Lankao, Qi County and Huaiyang in Henan in the west to the Yellow Sea coast in the east. It corresponds to the period of city-state development.

== Legendary period ==
=== Dongyi ===
The Dongyi (東夷, "Eastern Yi") people was a collective name used by the early Chinese dynasties for the peoples living in the lower Yellow River and Huai River regions, centered on present-day Shandong. The term Yi appears in Shang dynasty oracle bone inscriptions, where the Shang record wars against Yi polities such as Renfang. The compound "Dongyi" became standard under the Zhou dynasty. In early usage it was a political and cultural label for the eastern tribal confederations rather than a strict ethnic category.

Archaeologically, the Dongyi are associated with a continuous sequence of Neolithic and Bronze Age cultures centered on the Tai–Yi mountain region: the Houli culture (c. 6400–5700 BCE), the Beixin culture, the Dawenkou culture (c. 4300–2500 BCE), the Shandong Longshan culture (c. 2900–2100 BCE), and the Yueshi culture (c. 1950–1500 BCE), which coexisted with the Xia and early Shang. These cultures are noted for advanced pottery, especially the thin black "eggshell" ware of the Longshan period, early copper working, jade carving, and incised symbols. The pictographs on Dawenkou vessels from Ju County and the inscribed potsherd from Dinggong are sometimes discussed as precursors of Chinese writing, though their nature remains debated.

Traditional histories link several legendary figures to the Dongyi, including Taihao, Shaohao, whose capital was placed at Qufu, and Chiyou, said to have been defeated by the Yellow Emperor. Bird worship was a prominent feature of their culture: the Zuo zhuan records that Shaohao named his officials after birds, and the founding myths of the Shang and Qin both involve a dark bird (xuanniao).

Relations with the central plains alternated between alliance and conflict. In the late Shang, campaigns against the eastern Yi, particularly under King Di Xin, drained the dynasty's strength. After the Zhou conquest, the Dongyi joined a rebellion of Shang loyalists, which the Duke of Zhou suppressed. The Zhou destroyed the eastern states of Yan and Pugu and established Lu and Qi to control the region. Indigenous states such as Lai, Ju, Tan and Xu persisted for centuries. Qi annexed Lai in 567 BCE, and by the Warring States period most of the Dongyi had been absorbed into the Huaxia population.

After the Qin unification the term no longer referred to peoples within China proper. It was instead applied to peoples of Manchuria, the Korean Peninsula and the Japanese archipelago. Modern historians, following Fu Sinian's "Yi–Xia East–West" theory, generally regard the Dongyi as one of the principal ancestral groups of the Han Chinese in the Shandong region.

=== Three Sovereigns and Five Emperors ===
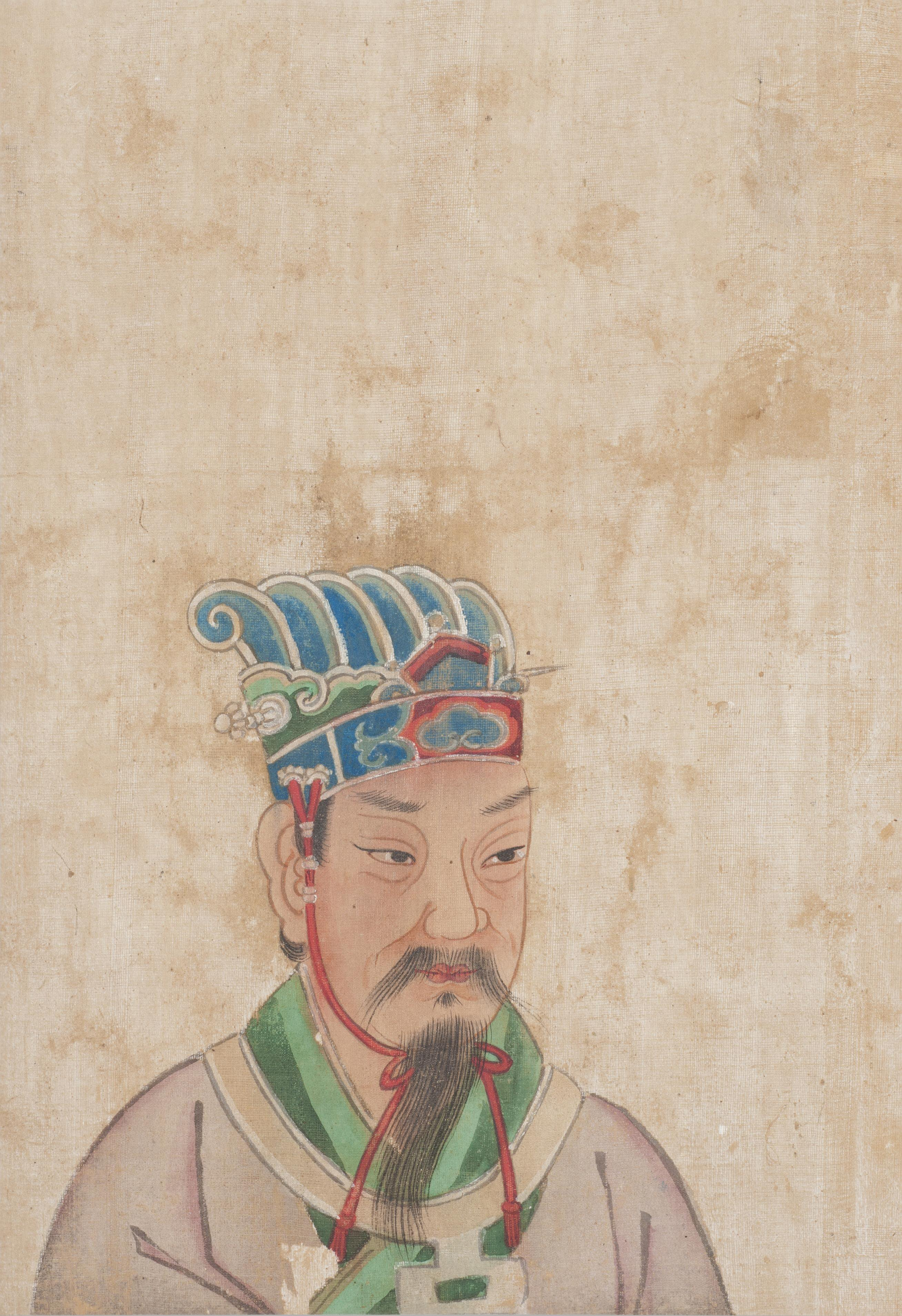
Shaohao was the leader of Dongyi people and one of the Three Sovereigns and Five Emperors

Shandong is the setting of many legends of ancient history. Geographically, the earlier figures such as Taihao and Shaohao were active in the hills of south-central Shandong, while the later figures such as Chiyou, Zhuanxu, Emperor Ku, Shun, Gao Yao and Boyi were active on the plains of northwestern Shandong and in the border areas of neighboring provinces.

Taihao, of the Feng clan, was a tribal leader of the Dongyi. The Taihao tribe was originally active in south-central Shandong; after the rise of the Shaohao tribe, it moved to the area of present-day Huaiyang, Henan (the State of Chen in the Spring and Autumn period). The Zuo Zhuan records that the Taihao clan used the dragon as its emblem. The Spring and Autumn states of Ren, Su, Xuju and Zhuanyu were said to be descendants of Taihao.

Twenty-eight years after abdicating, Yao died at the age of 118 (some accounts say 116 or 117) and was buried at Chengyang in Jiyin (present-day Dingtao, Shandong).

=== Xia dynasty ===
During the Xia dynasty, present-day Shandong was still largely controlled by the Dongyi. Southwestern Shandong and the areas bordering present-day Henan and Hebei were strongly influenced by Xia culture, while the rest of Shandong and northern Jiangsu and Anhui had a distinct Dongyi culture. The Dongyi tribes and polities developed unevenly: some remained at the stage of clan society, while others had entered, or were entering, class society. Tribal polities began to rise; they were scattered and independent of one another, each with a relatively fixed place of residence and range of activity. Notable tribal polities in Shandong during the Xia period included Xue, Fan, Youreng, Youmin, Sanzong, Gu, Youshen, Youqiong, Youge, Guo, Han, Zhenguan, Zhenxun, Fei, Zeng, Qi and Guan.

== Ancient period ==
=== Shang dynasty ===
Bronze Jue excavated from Daxinzhuang Site

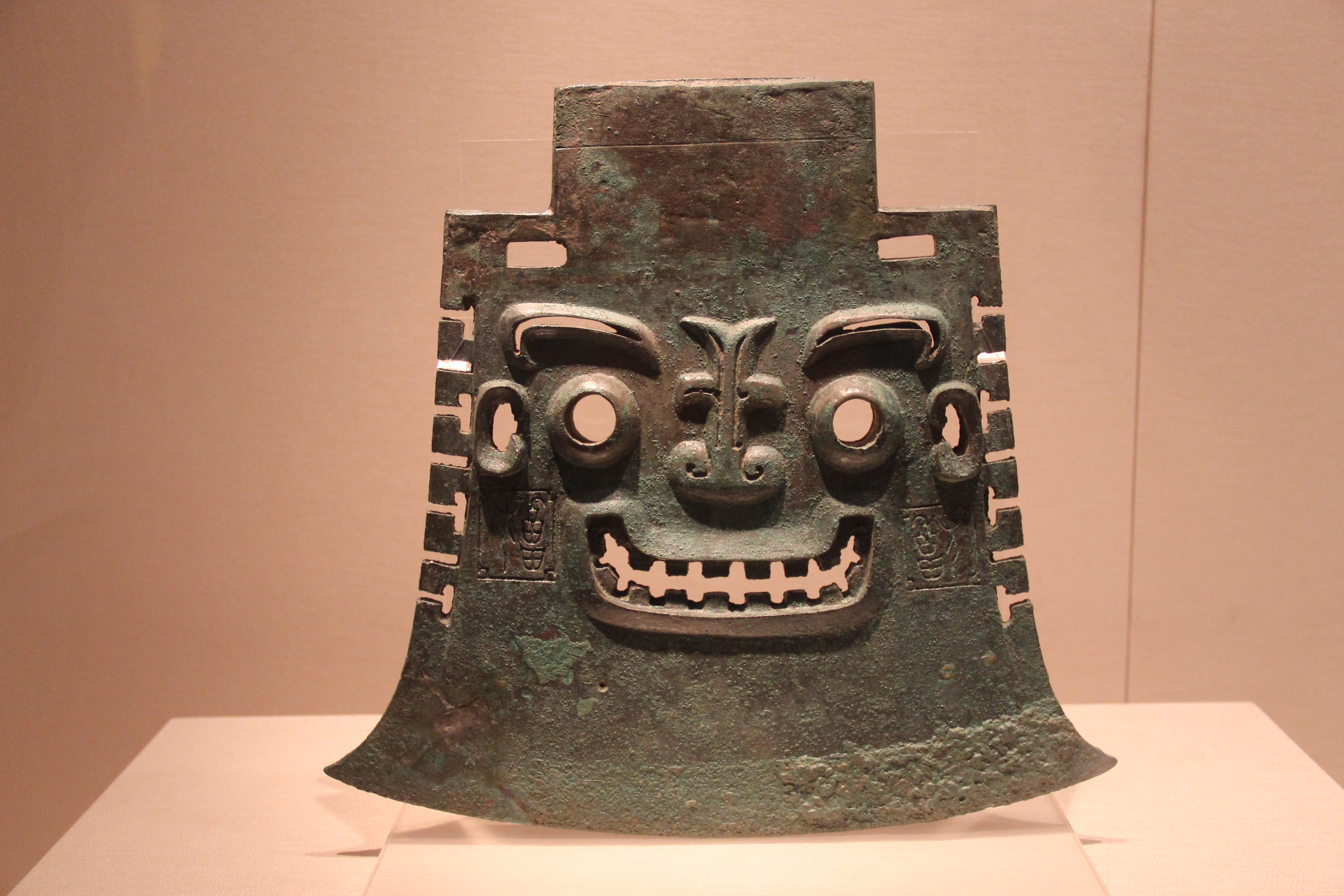
Yachou bronze axe (亞醜鉞) was forged by a tribe of Dongyi people in Shang era, which probably called Yachou (Note: Some scholars believe that Yachou was the State of Pugu); its exquisite workmanship and valuable inscripts made it China's first-class national artifact and now preserved in China National Museum

At the end of the Xia period, the Shang tribe rose to power. In its early period the Shang tribe was centered in southwestern Shandong. The Shang ancestor Xie had his capital at Fan (in present-day Tengzhou, Zaozhuang), and Xiangtu had an eastern capital at the foot of Mount Tai. Taking advantage of the breakdown in relations between the Xia and the eastern tribes, Tang of Shang convened the "Assembly of Jingbo" with the eastern peoples and formed a broad alliance with the Dongyi, creating a coalition led by Tang, comprising the Shang and many eastern tribes, to overthrow the Xia. Archaeological evidence indicates that before the founding of the Shang dynasty, relations between the Shang and the Yi were harmonious, and the two peoples lived intermingled in the area of Qi County in eastern Henan. In the early Shang period, Shang culture in the east maintained the same boundary with the Dongyi Yueshi culture as at the end of the Xia and beginning of the Shang, while expanding steadily to the north, west and south, showing that the harmonious Shang–Yi relationship continued into the early Shang.

The early Shang capital was at Bo (in present-day Cao County). The Shang later moved its capital eight times, twice within Shandong: its fifth move took it eastward to Bi (present-day Yuncheng), and its sixth to Yan (present-day Qufu). The territory ruled by the Shang was larger than that of the Xia, and the number of polities increased further. The main polities within present-day Shandong included Yan, Pugu, Zhu, Ju, Tan, Pang, Hua, Gu, Shu, Li, Lai, Qi, Zeng, Shen and Ren.

Western Shandong, the center of the Shang tribe's activity before the dynasty was founded, remained one of the core areas of Shang rule afterwards, while eastern Shandong was ruled by the Dongyi. Relations between the Shang and the Yi were fairly harmonious in the pre-dynastic and early Shang periods, but from Zhong Ding onward, in the middle and late Shang, the Shang fought many wars with the Dongyi tribes and polities to the east. Shang power pushed steadily eastward, yet until the fall of the dynasty most of eastern Shandong remained in Dongyi hands. To secure its rule over the Dongyi who had submitted, the Shang administered them through allied states such as Yan and Pugu.

The middle Shang marked a turning point in Shang–Yi relations. The Bamboo Annals records that when Zhong Ding ascended the throne he campaigned against the Lan Yi, and the "Treatise on the Eastern Barbarians" in the Book of the Later Han states that from Zhong Ding's time the Lan Yi raided the Shang, alternately submitting and rebelling for more than three hundred years. In other words, from Zhong Ding onward Shang–Yi relations deteriorated: the Dongyi tribes alternately submitted to and rebelled against the Shang, and the Shang abandoned its tradition of friendship with the Dongyi and began waging war against them. Archaeologically, Shang remains of this period appear widely in eastern Henan and central and western Shandong, areas formerly belonging to the Yueshi culture. The Shang first occupied eastern Henan and southwestern Shandong. In northern Shandong it reached the Jinan area, establishing a regional center at Daxinzhuang; in southern Shandong it penetrated the Tengzhou area, establishing a regional center at Qianzhangda. Throughout the middle Shang, however, the Shang did not advance beyond the Xiaoqing River basin, and the vast areas of eastern Shandong and northern Jiangsu remained under Dongyi control.

In the late Shang, the dynasty continued the policy of warfare against the Dongyi begun under Zhong Ding. Dongyi groups mentioned in late Shang oracle bone inscriptions include the Yifang (also called Renfang or Shifang), the Fangyi, the Yuyi (Yufang), the Baiyi and the Huangyi. The oracle bones preserve many records of Shang campaigns against the Renfang from Wu Ding to Di Xin, the largest being under Di Xin, who launched several campaigns in response to repeated Yifang incursions. Scholars including Li Xueqin identify the Yifang as a Dongyi polity in central and eastern Shandong, with its capital in northern Shandong between the Zi River and the Wei River. Early in the late Shang, the Shang gained an advantage in northern Shandong and pushed into the Mi River basin, but did not advance eastward in southern Shandong. Shang culture and the Dongyi Zhenzhumen culture faced each other roughly along a line running from the Mi River through Mount Lu and the Si River to Tengzhou.

With the eastern campaigns of the middle Shang, some Dongyi tribes began to adopt Shang culture, in three main forms. Some were conquered and fully assimilated, such as eastern Henan, which later came under direct Shang control. Others were conquered and adopted Shang culture while retaining elements of their own, as with most of the eastern polities that submitted to the Shang: Shang culture became dominant, but each retained elements of the Yueshi culture to varying degrees. Still others, the Dongyi polities and groups never conquered by the Shang, lived mainly on the Jiaodong Peninsula, in southeastern Shandong and in northern Jiangsu; their cultures too were strongly influenced by the Shang.

=== Zhou dynasty ===
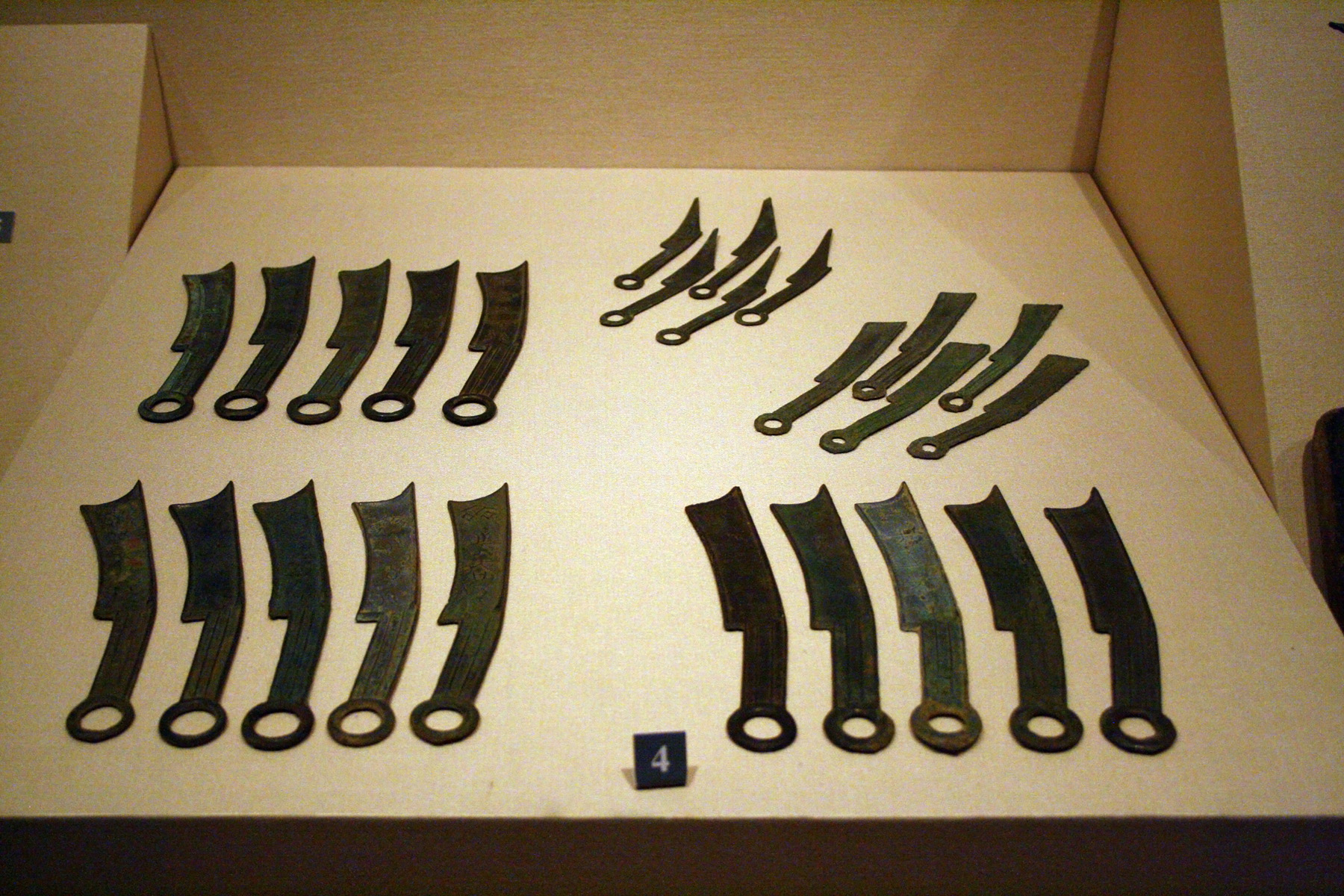
Knife money of the State of Qi

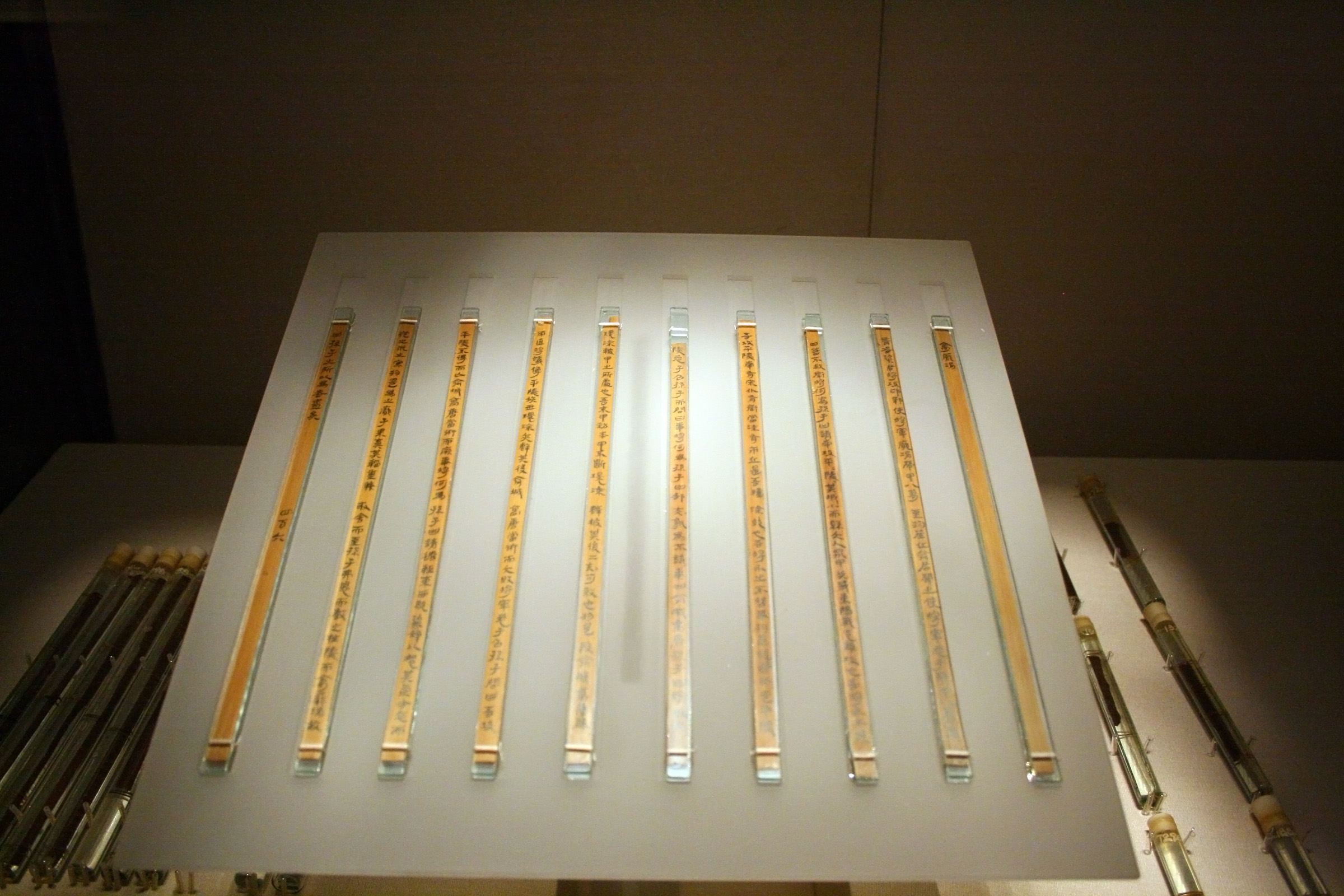
Bamboo slips of Sun Bin's Art of War excavated at Yinqueshan, Lanshan

The modern Shandong province was mainly divided into Qi and Lu states during the Eastern Zhou dynasty

In the late Shang, the campaigns against the Dongyi seriously weakened the dynasty and sharpened social tensions. The Zhou, allied with lords across the country, launched a campaign against the Shang, overthrew its last ruler Di Xin, and founded the Zhou dynasty. To consolidate its rule, the Zhou adopted a system of enfeoffing relatives as a protective barrier for the royal house. Important fiefdoms in present-day Shandong included Qi, Lu, Cheng, Cao, Teng and Gao. Of these, Qi and Lu were by far the most influential, which is why Shandong is still called "the land of Qi and Lu" (齐鲁大地).

Qi had its capital at Linzi. According to the Zuo Zhuan (Duke Xi, year 4), its territory reached the sea in the east, the Yellow River in the west, Muling (on the border between present-day Yishui and Linqu) in the south, and Wudi (present-day Yanshan, Hebei) in the north. Qi promoted commerce and crafts and exploited its fish and salt resources, attracting many people. It absorbed Dongyi culture, adapting to local customs and simplifying rites, and promoted officials on the basis of merit. Pragmatic, reformist and inclusive, Qi became very powerful. Its crafts and industries, such as textiles, were highly developed, and it was said that Qi "supplied caps, sashes, clothes and shoes to all under heaven".

Lu had its capital at Qufu. Its territory is described in the "Bi Gong" ode of the "Hymns of Lu" in the Classic of Poetry as looking up to lofty Mount Tai, holding Mount Gui and Mount Meng, and reaching the eastern lands as far as the sea, with the Huai Yi coming to submit. Lu preserved the rites and music of the Zhou court and followed the principle of "honoring the honorable and loving one's kin". With a well-developed agriculture, it was a "state of rites and propriety" that valued benevolence, tradition, ethics and social harmony.

The culture of Qi and Lu contributed greatly to the formation and development of Chinese culture. Confucius, born in the Lu capital Qufu, founded Confucianism there, which became the foundation of the structure and values of later Chinese society. Mencius, Zhuangzi, Sun Tzu, Mozi, Lu Ban, Bian Que and others are outstanding representatives of the region's many contributions to Chinese civilization.

During the Spring and Autumn period, there were also many smaller states in present-day Shandong; the Zuo Zhuan alone mentions 55. Among the larger and more influential were Lai, Ju and Teng, most of which were later annexed by Qi and Lu. In a three-year eastern campaign, the Duke of Zhou crushed the rebellion of Wu Geng, son of Di Xin, and his Dongyi allies, after which Qi and Lu annexed states such as Yan and Pugu. Jiang Taigong also conquered Lai, extending Qi's power to the Jiaodong Peninsula. In the Warring States period, Qi became one of the Seven Warring States, and most of present-day Shandong was held by Qi and Lu. In 249 BC Chu conquered Lu; in 223 BC Qin conquered Chu. In 221 BC Qi became the last state to be annexed by Qin. China was unified for the first time, and the lands of Qi and Lu became an integral part of China.

Philosophers of Shandong during the Eastern Zhou Era

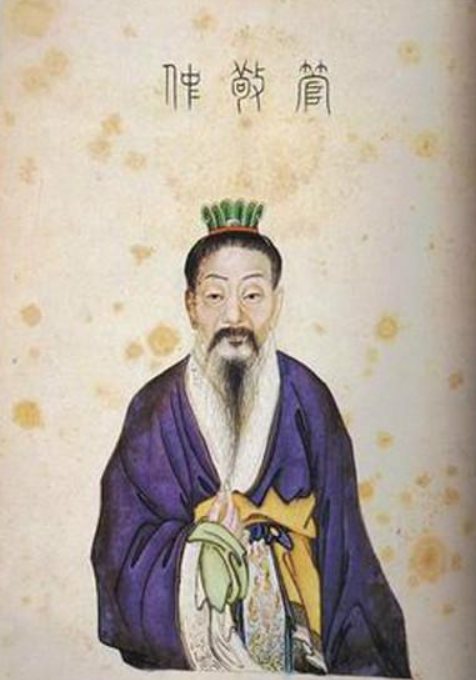
Guan Zhong (720–645 BC)

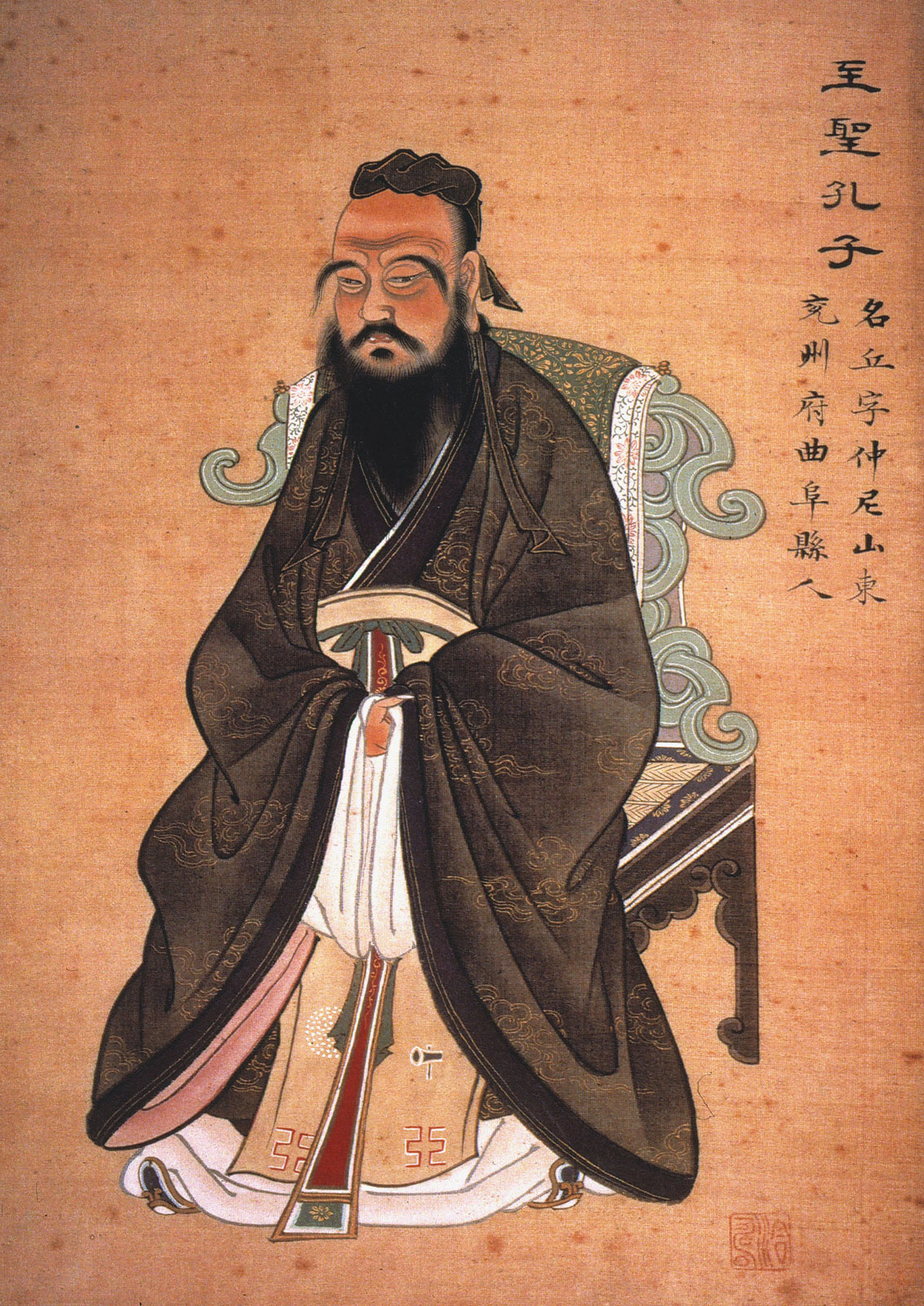
Confucius (551-479 BC)

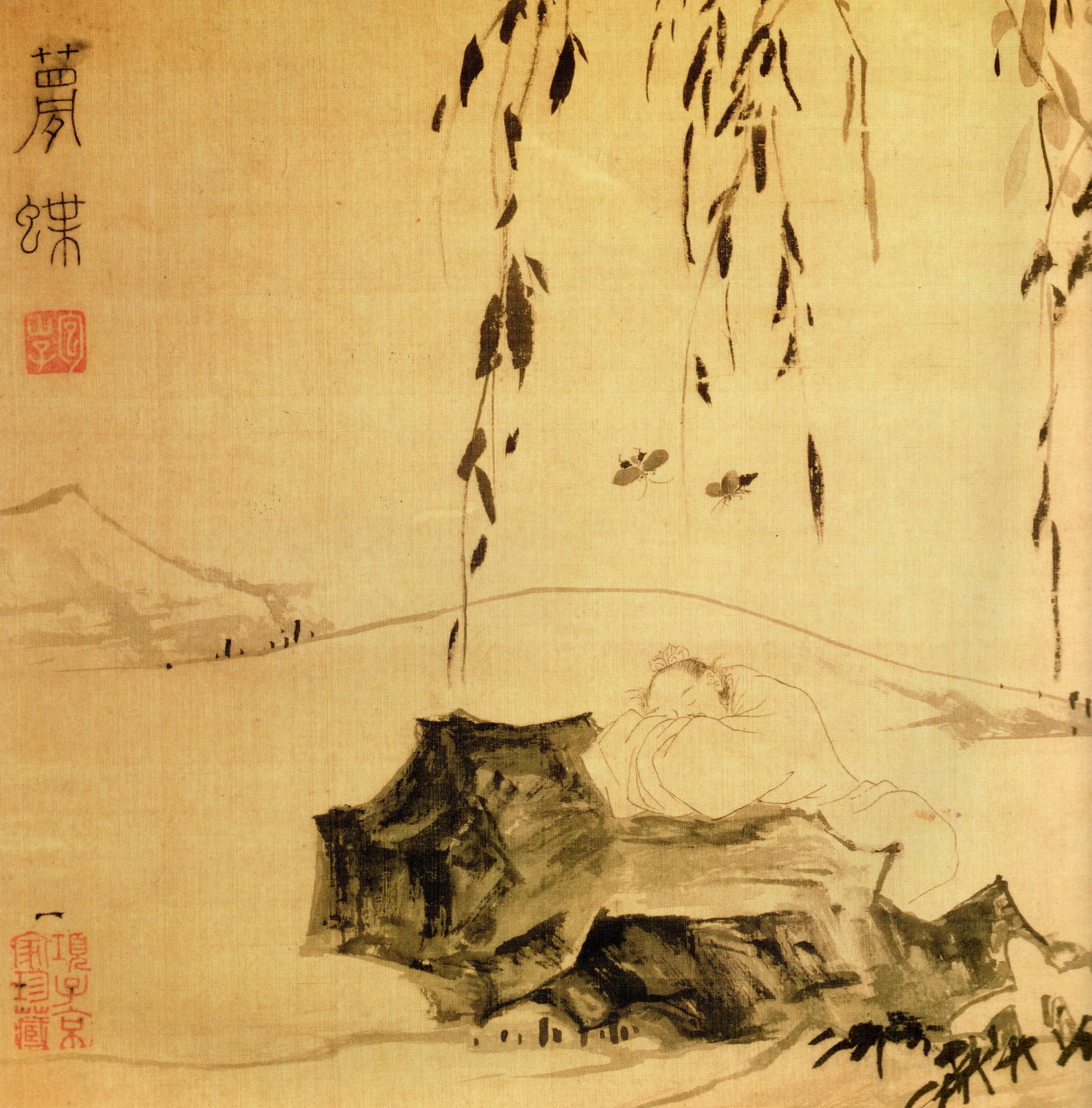
Zhuangzi (4th century BC)

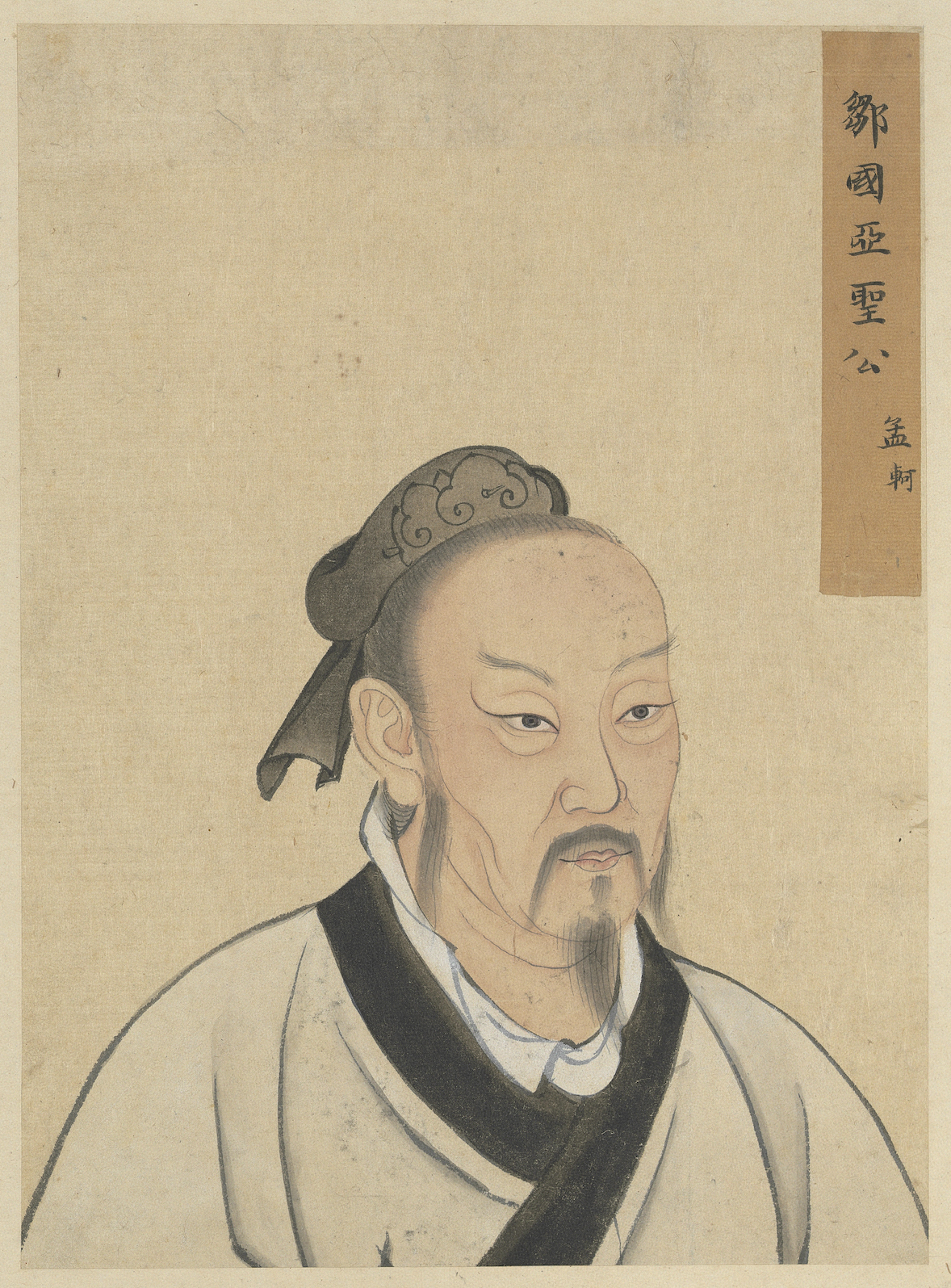
Mencius (371-289 BC)

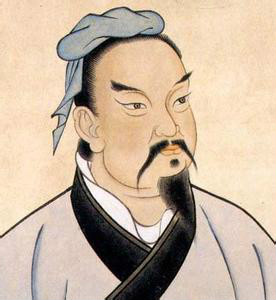
Sun Tzu (544-496 BC)

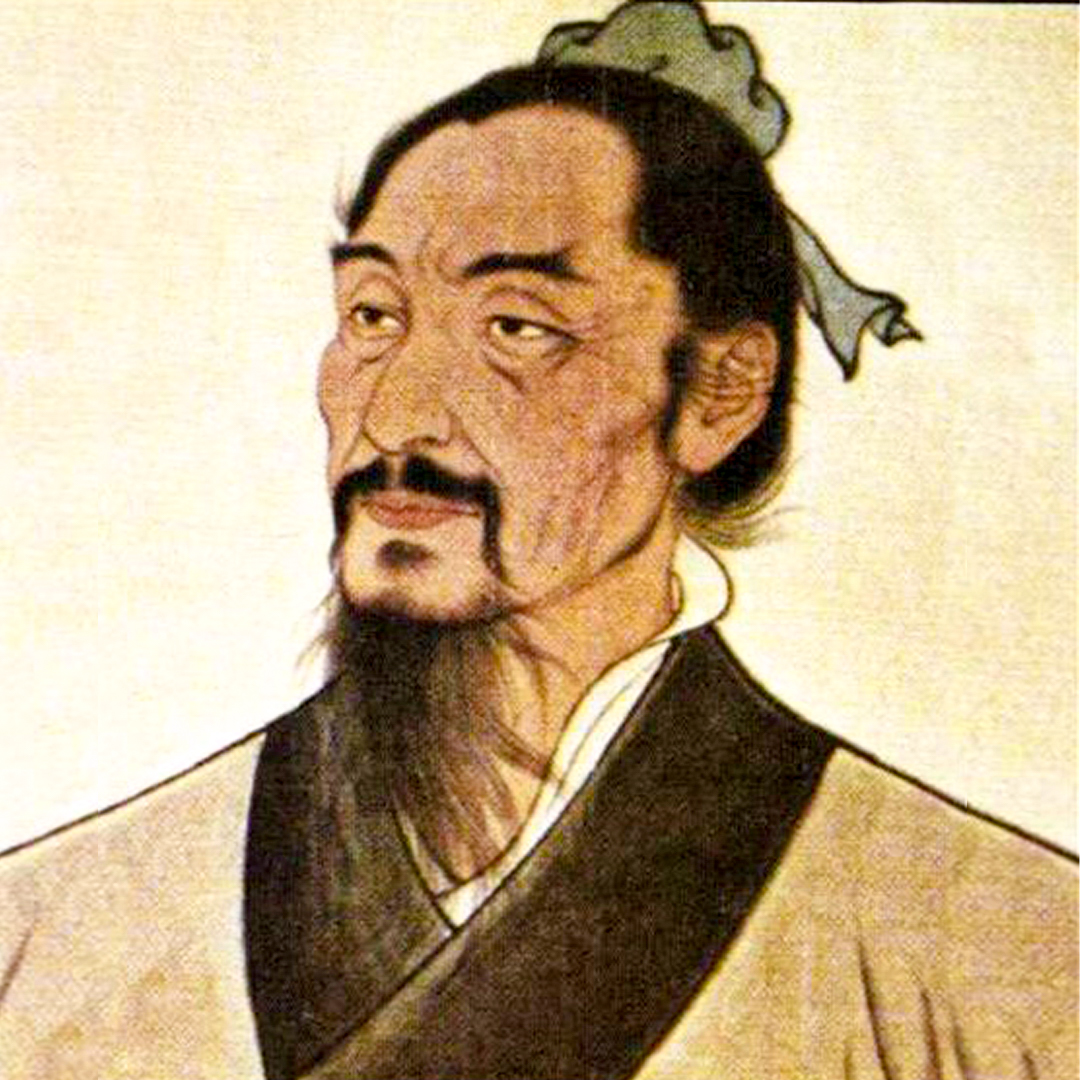
Mozi (375 – 221 BC)

== Imperial period ==
=== Qin dynasty ===
==== Qin's rule over Shandong ====
Qin commanderies in present-day Shandong

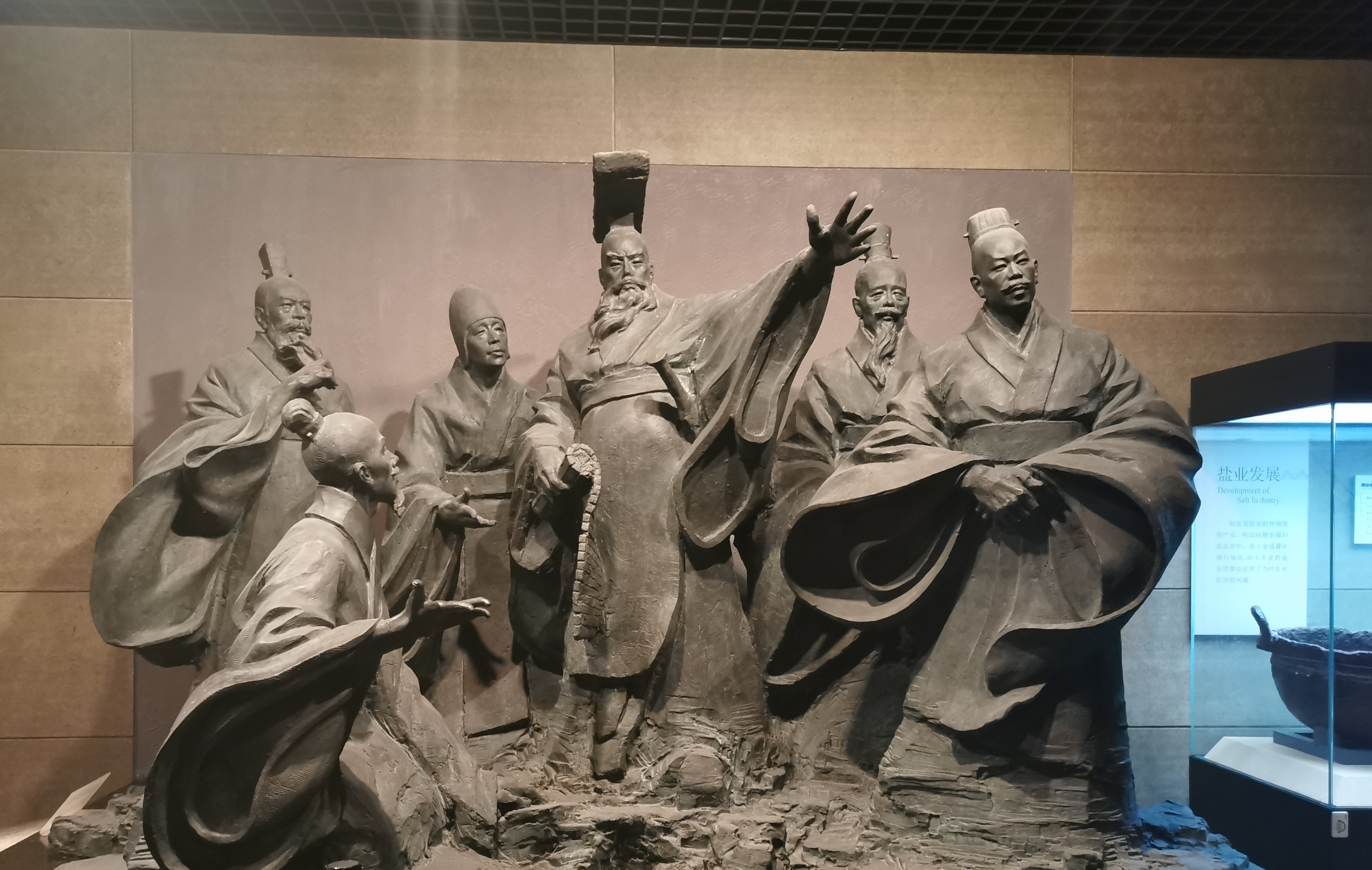
Sculpture of Qin Shi Huang's eastern tour in the Yantai Museum

The Qin dynasty implemented the commandery-county system nationwide. There were eleven commanderies wholly or partly within present-day Shandong, among them Linzi, Langya, Jibei, Jiaodong and Xue. To strengthen control over the region, Qin Shi Huang ordered the old aristocracy and wealthy families of Qi to be relocated to Xianyang, Ba and Shu and elsewhere, demolished the Great Wall of Qi, and built imperial roads directly to Xianyang, promoting economic and cultural exchange between Shandong and other regions. The Qin standardized writing and abolished the ancient script of Qi, accelerating the convergence of Shandong's language and culture with those of other regions.

Early in the Qin, many Shandong intellectuals cooperated with the dynasty; Chunyu Yue of Qi, Shusun Tong of Xue and Kong Fu, a ninth-generation descendant of Confucius, all served as boshi (court scholars) in Xianyang. However, the Qin favored Legalism while Qi and Lu were largely Confucian, and the two sides differed sharply in thought and politics. In addition, because Qin Shi Huang sought immortality, many fangshi (masters of esoteric arts) from Yan and Qi also served at the Qin court. After the "burning of books and burying of scholars", Confucian scholars and fangshi who escaped fled Xianyang, and some, such as Kong Fu and Shusun Tong, joined the peasant uprisings against Qin rule.

Qin Shi Huang made five tours of the empire, three of which reached present-day Shandong. In 219 BC, on his second eastern tour, he performed the fengshan sacrifices at Mount Tai and built the Langya Terrace. In 218 BC he visited Zhifu and Langya, and in 210 BC he visited Zhifu and Langya again, dying on the return journey. His repeated tours of Shandong reflected both the importance he attached to the region and his quest for immortality.

==== Restoration of the Qi ====
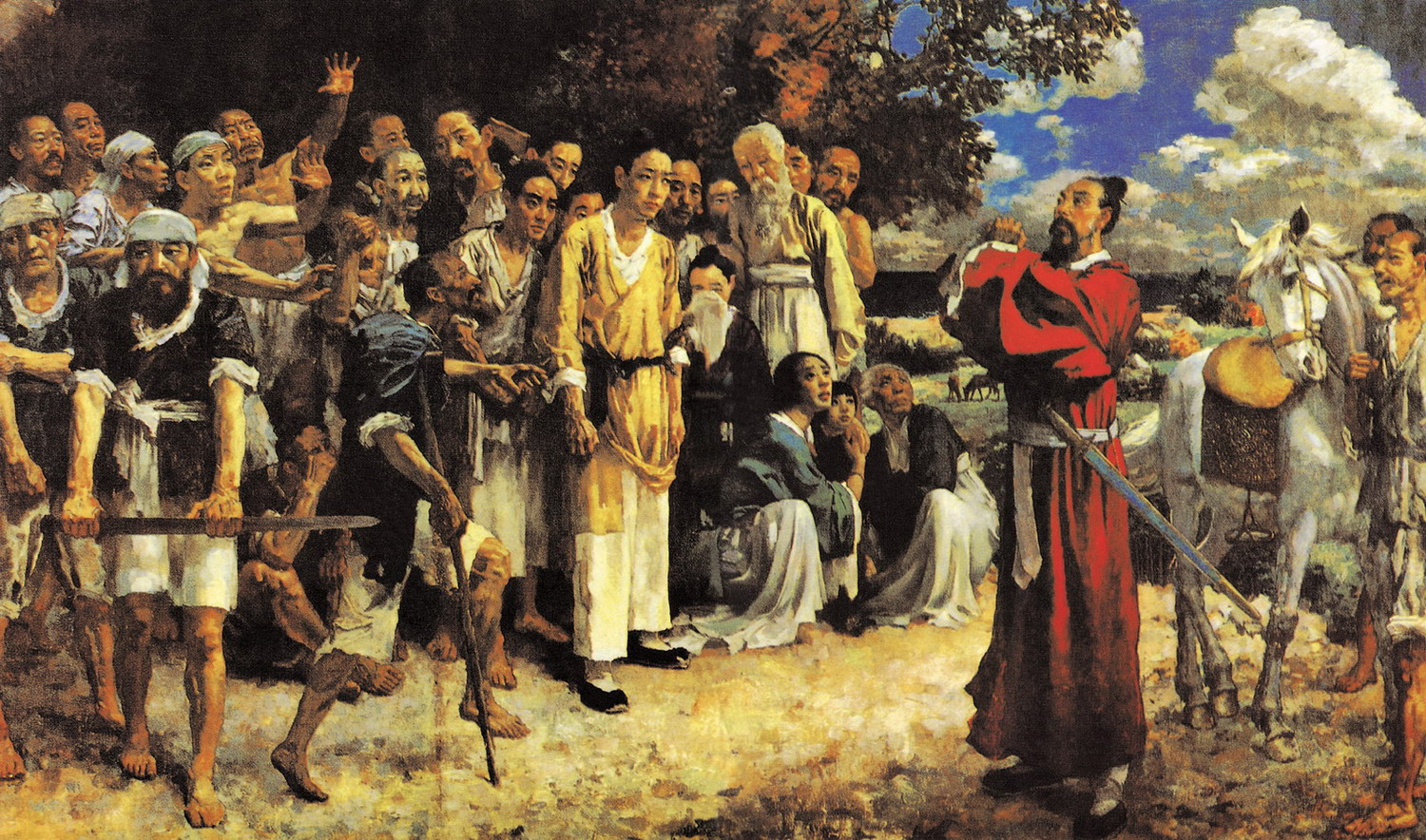
The Five Hundred Retainers of Tian Heng by Xu Beihong

In the seventh month of the first year of the Second Emperor (209 BC), after the uprising of Chen Sheng and Wu Guang broke out at Dazexiang (in present-day Anhui), Peng Yue rose against the Qin at Changyi (in present-day Juye, Heze) and quickly became a major armed force of the late Qin. Liu Bang rose at Pei (in present-day Xuzhou, Jiangsu), and part of southern Shandong was within his sphere of activity. Nobles of the former Six States also rose against Qin: Xiang Liang and his nephew Xiang Yu, descendants of a famous Chu general, rose at Wuzhong and marched north, while Tian Dan, a member of the Tian royal house of Qi, rose with his cousins Tian Rong and Tian Heng, proclaimed himself King of Qi and occupied the former territory of Qi.

In 208 BC, the Qin general Zhang Han besieged Wei Jiu, King of Wei, at Linji, and Tian Dan, who came to relieve Wei, was killed by Zhang Han. The people of Qi enthroned Tian Jia, younger brother of Jian, the last King of Qi, while Tian Rong fled with the remnants of the Qi army to Dong'e. After Zhang Han withdrew, Tian Rong drove out Tian Jia and enthroned Tian Dan's son Tian Fu as King of Qi. Xiang Liang, pursuing Zhang Han, asked Qi and Zhao for reinforcements; Qi refused, the Chu army was defeated at Dingtao and Xiang Liang was killed, and Tian Rong thus earned the enmity of Xiang Yu. The following year (207 BC) Xiang Yu crushed the Qin army at Julu. After the fall of the Qin, Xiang Yu divided the realm among the lords, splitting the lands of Qi into three kingdoms: Qi, Jibei and Jiaodong. Tian Fu was transferred to be King of Jiaodong with his capital at Jimo; Tian Du was made King of Qi with his capital at Linzi; and Tian An was made King of Jibei with his capital at Boyang. Tian Du, formerly one of Tian Rong's generals, had followed Xiang Yu since his campaign to relieve Zhao and entered the Guanzhong with him, and was rewarded with the kingship of Qi. Tian An, a grandson of King Jian of Qi, had taken several cities in Jibei when Xiang Yu crossed the river to relieve Zhao and brought his troops over to Xiang Yu, and was therefore made King of Jibei. Tian Rong, having refused to send troops to help Chu and Zhao against Qin, received no kingdom and resented Xiang Yu.

After the enfeoffment the lords departed for their kingdoms. Tian Rong rebelled, drove Tian Du to Chu, and ordered Tian Fu to remain in the Qi capital Linzi rather than go to Jiaodong. Fearing Xiang Yu, Tian Fu left for Jiaodong anyway; the enraged Tian Rong pursued him to Jimo and killed him, and also destroyed Tian An, King of Jibei. Tian Rong proclaimed himself King of Qi and united all of Qi. Xiang Yu then invaded Qi from the south. Defeated, Tian Rong fled to Pingyuan, where he was killed by the local people. Xiang Yu's massacres and burnings in Qi, however, turned the people against him, and Tian Rong's brother Tian Heng gathered tens of thousands of scattered troops at Chengyang and counterattacked. At the same time the Chu capital Pengcheng fell to Liu Bang, King of Han, forcing Xiang Yu to withdraw from Qi. Tian Heng recovered the cities of Qi, enthroned Tian Rong's son Tian Guang as King of Qi and served as chancellor himself, controlling the government. During the war between Chu and Han, Liu Bang sent Li Yiji to persuade Qi to side with Han. After Qi agreed and relaxed its guard against Han, the Han general Han Xin attacked Qi and advanced all the way to its capital, Linzi. Tian Guang had Li Yiji boiled alive and fled to Gaomi; Tian Heng fled to Boyang. Tian Guang was later captured and killed; Tian Heng proclaimed himself king but was defeated by Guan Ying and fled to the land of Liang to join Peng Yue. Han Xin soon pacified Qi.

In the fourth year of Han (203 BC), having finally pacified Qi, Han Xin asked Liu Bang to appoint him acting King of Qi on the grounds that the region was still unsettled. Liu Bang, then besieged by the Chu army at Xingyang, was furious but had no choice but to make Han Xin King of Qi. Xiang Yu later sent envoys urging Han Xin to turn against Han, which he refused; he also ignored Kuai Tong's advice to declare independence to avoid being discarded once his usefulness ended. Han Xin then led his army to help Liu Bang defeat Xiang Yu, after which Liu Bang made a surprise move against the Qi army and stripped Han Xin of his command. In the fifth year of Han, Han Xin was transferred to be King of Chu. Hearing that many worthy men of Qi were still with Tian Heng, who had fled to an island, and fearing they would cause future trouble, Liu Bang sent an envoy to pardon Tian Heng and summon him to court. Tian Heng killed himself shortly before reaching Luoyang, and Liu Bang buried him with the rites of a feudal king.

=== Han dynasty ===
In the late stage of the Chu–Han Contention, Han Xin attacked Qi from Zhao and was made King of Qi by Liu Bang, ruling the former territory of the Tian house. Xiang Yu sent Long Ju to attack Han Xin in alliance with the old Qi forces, but was defeated, and Qi gradually came under Han control. After defeating Xiang Yu, Liu Bang took Han Xin's army and, given the importance of the region, transferred him to be King of Chu. The former territory of Qi came under direct Han rule, comprising the four commanderies of Linzi, Jibei, Jiaodong and Langya. In 202 BC Liu Bang proclaimed himself emperor, and the following year (201 BC) he made his eldest son by a concubine, Liu Fei, King of Qi, ruling the seven commanderies of Linzi, Boyang, Jibei, Jiaodong, Jiaoxi, Langya and Chengyang, with 73 counties. Boyang had been split off from Jibei, and Jiaoxi and Chengyang from Langya.

Long praised as "a thousand li of fertile soil", Shandong had well-developed agriculture and crafts from early times, and from the Qin and Han onward it was one of China's economic centers. Grain from Shandong was constantly shipped westward up the Yellow River to supply the Guanzhong region. In the Western Han, the region had more than 17 million people in over 3.9 million households, nearly a third of the empire's population, and was among its most densely populated areas. Shandong was one of the sources of the Han-era Silk Road: Linzi, Dingtao and Kangfu (present-day Jining) were the empire's three great textile centers, and large quantities of fine textiles flowed from them to the Western Regions.

=== Sui, Tang and Five Dynasties ===
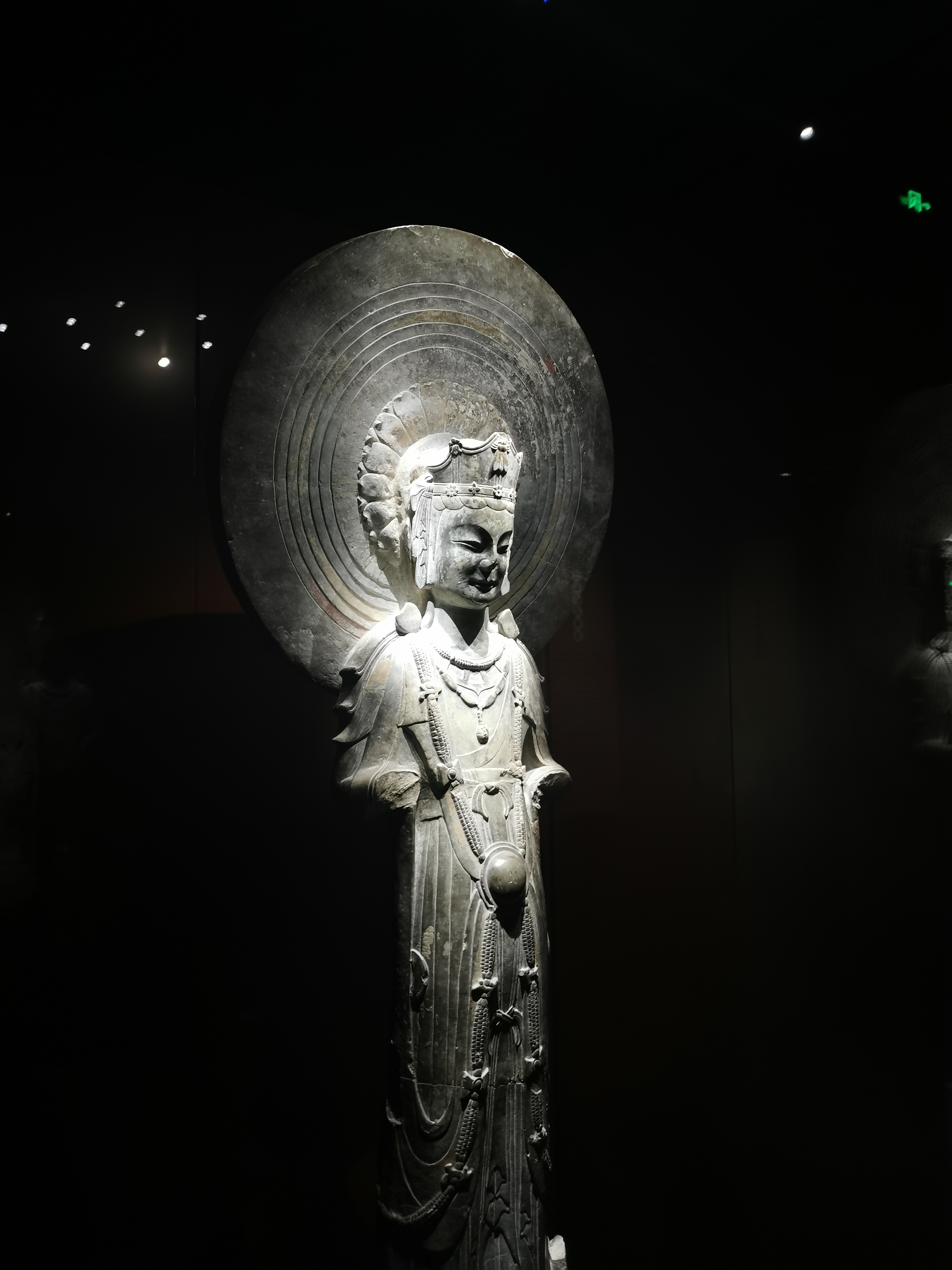
Buddhist statue of the Northern Wei period excavated at Qingzhou

At the beginning of the Sui dynasty, Shandong accounted for 21% of the empire's households. Under the Tang dynasty the region recovered and developed, belonging mainly to Henan Circuit. During the Kaiyuan and Tianbao eras, several million shi of millet were shipped to the Guanzhong every year, yet prices in Qing and Qi (present-day Qingzhou and Jinan) remained far lower than elsewhere in China. The "mirror-flower damask" of Yanzhou and the "immortal-pattern damask" of Qingzhou were renowned throughout the country. In the late Tang, war broke out again.

=== Song, Jin and Yuan ===
In 997, the Song divided the empire into fifteen circuits, and present-day Shandong belonged to Jingdong Circuit. In 1072, Jingdong Circuit was formally divided into Jingdong East and Jingdong West circuits; most of Shandong belonged to Jingdong East Circuit, and southwestern Shandong to Jingdong West Circuit.

During the Northern Song, Song Jiang and others rebelled at Liangshan, a story later told in the novel Water Margin.

During the Jianyan era the entire region fell to the Jin, and the Jingdong East and West circuits were abolished. The Jin established the Shandong East Circuit and Shandong West Circuit here, and the Yuan dynasty placed the region under the Central Secretariat as the Shandong East–West Circuit Pacification Commission.

Under the Jin and Yuan, heavy exploitation, repeated foreign incursions and brutal rule left society and the economy stagnant. By the Yuan period Shandong had only 1.26 million people in 380,000 households, a drop of about 87% in population and 75% in households compared with the Jin, and less than a tenth of the Western Han figures.

=== Ming and Qing ===
Shandong within Qing dynasty, 1820

Shandong Province was first established in the early Ming dynasty, at which time it included Liaoning. When the Ming recovered the region, much of Shandong was said to be uninhabited, and the government encouraged land reclamation. By the 26th year of Hongwu (1393), Shandong's cultivated land exceeded 72.4 million mu, 2.4 times that of the Northern Song and the third largest in the empire. The White Lotus leader Tang Sai'er led a rebellion in Shandong. After the Yongle Emperor moved the capital to Beijing in 1421, Jining and Linqing on the Grand Canal prospered with the growth of grain transport. However, during the Little Ice Age (c. 1550–1770), harvests fell and famines followed year after year; combined with harsh government, this led to wave after wave of peasant revolts under the Ming. In 1633 the Ming generals Kong Youde and Geng Zhongming led their troops from Dengzhou in Shandong to Liaodong to join the Manchus, and later entered China with the Qing army. After the 13th year of Chongzhen (1640), popular uprisings in Shandong intensified; the Ming sent Zhu Dadian to suppress them, and Shandong's population fell sharply.

By the Kangxi era of the Qing dynasty, agriculture in Shandong had gradually recovered, cultivated land reached over 90 million mu, and Shandong again became one of China's most populous provinces. On 25 July 1668, the Tancheng earthquake struck Shandong, with an epicentral intensity of XII, killing about 50,000 people, roughly 0.3% of the population at the time. In the nearly two centuries from the begning of Qing dynasty (1644) to the First Opium War (1840), around fifty recorded natural disasters, including floods, droughts, locust plagues, hailstorms and earthquakes, struck Shandong.

Administrative Map of Shandong Province during Ming and Qing dynasties

== Modern and contemporary period ==
=== Late Qing ===
==== Collapse of traditional economy ====
In 1855 the Yellow River shifted its course northward and once again flowed into the sea through Shandong. Thereafter the Shandong section of the Grand Canal gradually silted up, cities such as Jining, Linqing and Dongchang (Liaocheng) declined rapidly, and large numbers of canal workers lost their jobs.

Between 1849 and 1911, floods caused by breaches of the Yellow River and the Grand Canal occurred in 57 years; in many years floods and droughts occurred together, and in some years droughts, insect plagues and floods struck in the same year.

==== Opening of ports and foreign concessions ====
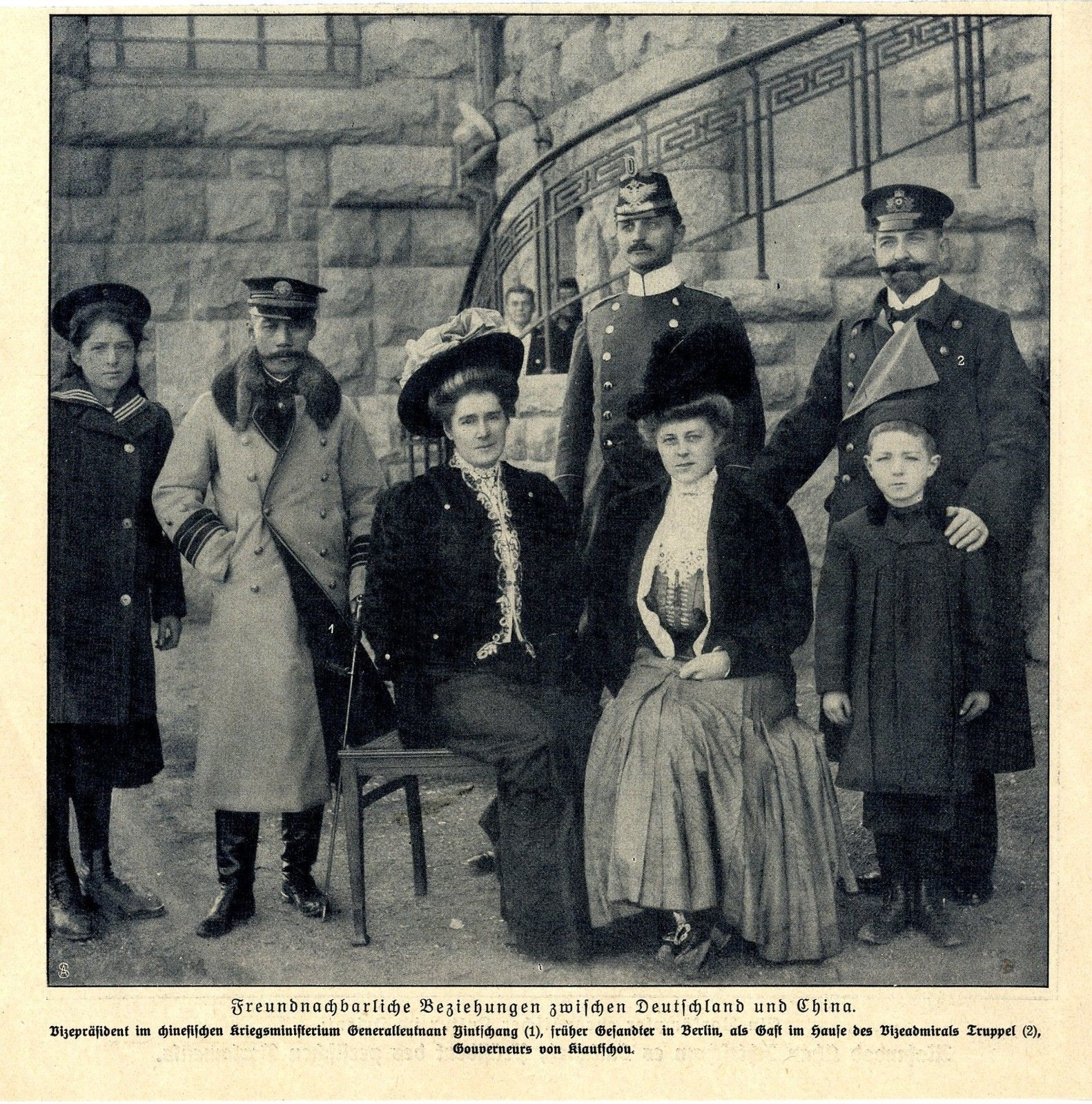
The Chinese Ambassador to Germany, Yinchang with Governor of Kiautschou Bay concession, Truppel in Qingdao

In the 1860s Yantai became Shandong's first treaty port. As sea transport had become the main link between northern and southern China, Yantai quickly prospered.

In 1898 Qingdao and Weihai were leased to Germany and Britain respectively. Weihai remained merely a naval base, while Qingdao, under German and later Japanese colonial rule, developed into an important industrial and commercial city of northern China.

Germany also built the Jiaoji Railway from Qingdao to Jinan (1905) and the northern section of the Tianjin–Pukou railway (1911), treating Shandong as its sphere of influence. Jinan, Weixian (Weifang) and Zhoucun along the Jiaoji Railway became self-opened commercial ports and grew considerably.

Shandong was also a key province for Western missionary work in China. In the 19th century the Catholic Church established three vicariates in Shandong, South, North and East, with cathedrals in Yanzhou, Jinan and Yantai respectively. South Shandong was entrusted to the German Society of the Divine Word, and North and East Shandong to Italian and French Franciscans. Many Protestant missions were active in Shandong, including the American Northern Presbyterians, Southern Baptists, American Board and Methodist Episcopal Church; the British Baptist Missionary Society, United Methodists, Anglicans, Plymouth Brethren and China Inland Mission; and German Lutherans. The Northern Presbyterians founded Tengchow College in Dengzhou (Penglai), one of China's earliest modern institutions of higher education and the predecessor of Cheeloo University in Jinan. In 1899 the Boxers arose in Shandong and attacked Western missionaries throughout the province.

Treaty ports and leased territories in Shandong (1860s-1920s)and some important places mentioned in the text
Treaty port; Self-opened port; Leased territory; Important places

==== War with Japan ====
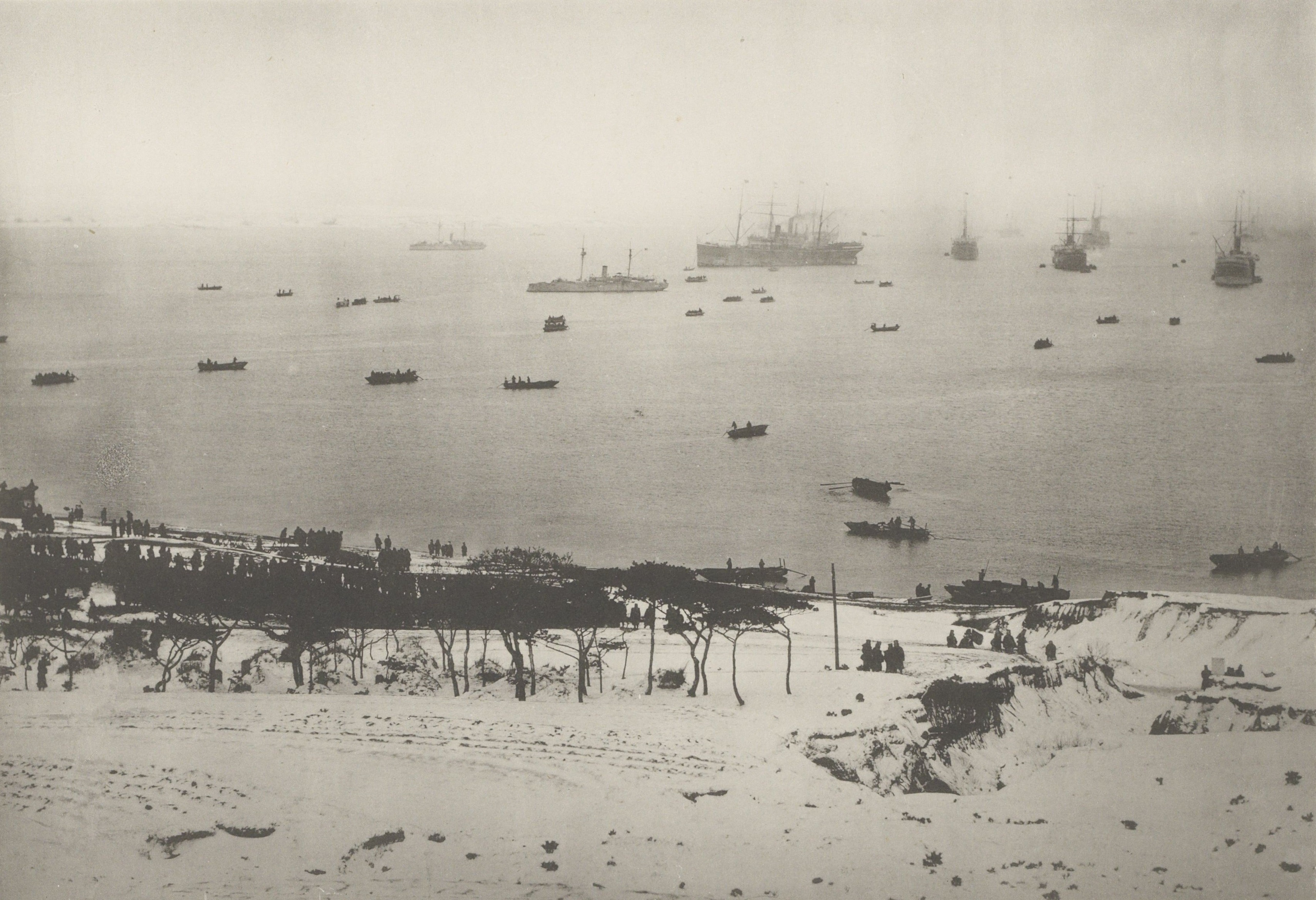
Japanese Army landed at Shuilong Bay, Rongcheng during the First Sino-Japanese War

In the late 19th century Shandong became central to China's naval modernization. As part of the Self-Strengthening Movement, Li Hongzhang built up the Beiyang Fleet, which was formally constituted in 1888 under Admiral Ding Ruchang. Its two main bases guarded the approaches to the Bohai Sea and Beijing: Lüshun (Port Arthur) on the Liaodong Peninsula, and Weihaiwei on the northern tip of the Shandong Peninsula. The fleet's headquarters were established on Liugong Island in Weihai Bay, and the harbor was ringed with coastal batteries built in the late 1880s with the help of German advisers. The fleet's core consisted of the German-built battleships Dingyuan and Zhenyuan, then among the most powerful warships in East Asia.

During the First Sino-Japanese War (1894–1895), the Beiyang Fleet was badly damaged at the Battle of the Yalu in September 1894 and withdrew first to Lüshun and then, after Lüshun fell in November, to Weihaiwei. In January 1895 Japanese troops landed at Rongcheng on the eastern tip of Shandong and advanced overland, capturing the forts on the shore of Weihai Bay. At the same time Japanese warships blockaded the harbor, and night torpedo-boat attacks disabled the Dingyuan and several other ships. With the fleet trapped and relief impossible, Ding Ruchang committed suicide, as did Dingyuan's captain Liu Buchan, and the remaining ships surrendered in February 1895. The Battle of Weihaiwei marked the destruction of the Beiyang Fleet. The defeat had lasting consequences for Shandong. Under the Treaty of Shimonoseki (April 1895), Japan occupied Weihaiwei as security for China's war indemnity. In 1898, after Japan withdrew, the port was leased to Britain as British Weihaiwei, which remained under British administration until 1930.

==== Immigration to Manchuria ====
In the late Qing, faced with the threat of Russia and Japan, Manchuria was finally opened to Han Chinese settlement. Together with the incentives offered by Zhang Zuolin in the early Republic, this led tens of millions of Shandong peasants to migrate northeast by land and sea over a century, in what is known as Chuang Guandong; their descendants form a major part of today's population of Northeast China.

=== Republic of China ===
==== 1911 Revolution ====
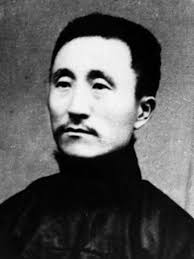
Xu Jingxin (1874–1914), a native from Huang County and the provincial head of Tongmenghui, played a vital role in the revolution in Shandong. After Yuan Shikai seized power, Xu was captured and murdered in Beijing

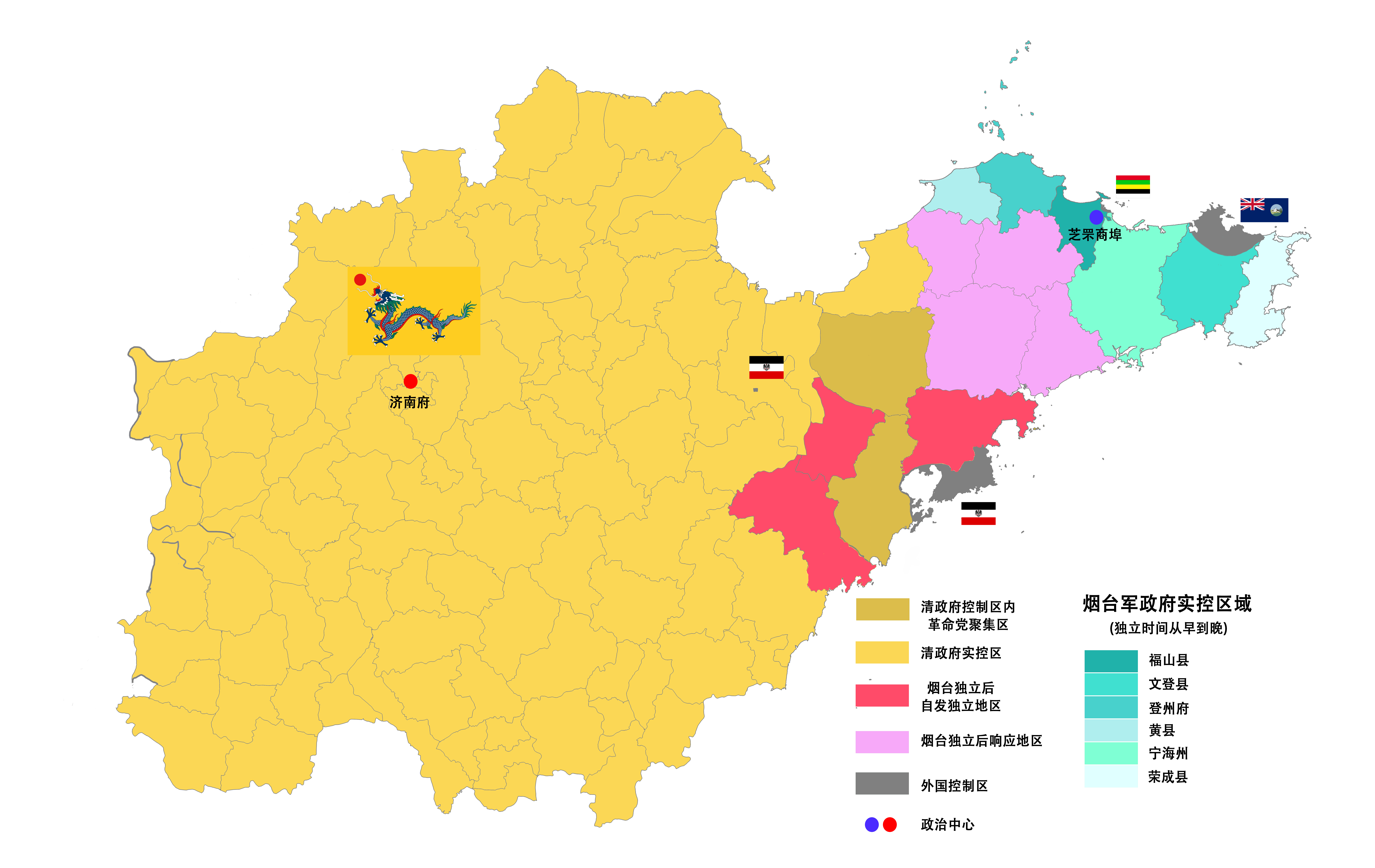
Situation in Shandong in the late 1911: Qing government–controlled areas Revolutionary party concentration areas within Qing government–control Self-declared independent areas after Yantai's independence Areas responding to Yantai's declaration of independence Foreign colonies (Weihaiwei and Kiautschou) Fushan County Wendeng County Dengzhou Prefecture Huang County Ninghai Subprefecture Rongcheng County

On November 12, 1911, members of the Tongmenghui in Yantai, Shandong, including Luan Zhongyao (欒鍾堯) and Gong Xide (宮錫德)—collectively known as the "Eighteen Heroes"—launched an uprising and seized the Yantai Coastal Defense Battalion. Upon learning of the revolt, the Yantai Circuit Intendant Xu Shiguang fled with his family to seek protection at the residence of the British official, head of the Donghai Customs (東海關稅務司). On November 13, the "Eighteen Heroes" sent a telegram to the Shanghai Military Governor Chen Qimei, declaring Yantai's independence and announcing the establishment of the Shandong Military Government. The following day, it was renamed the Shandong–Yantai Military and Political Sub-Administration, and Wang Chuanjiong, captain of the Qing Navy warship Wufeng, was elected commander-in-chief of the Yantai Military and Political Sub-Administration.

On November 13, under the persuasion of the Shandong revolutionary Ding Weifen (丁惟汾) and coercion from some officers, including acting commander Jia Binqing of the Fifth New Army Division, the Governor of Shandong Sun Baoqi agreed to declare Shandong's independence and was elected military governor. On November 24, however, Sun Baoqi again rescinded the declaration of independence under pressure from the Fifth New Army Division. Yuan Shikai ordered Zhang Guangjian to be promoted from sub-prefectural magistrate to provincial administration commissioner, and Wu Bingxiang to be promoted from reserve assistant magistrate to commissioner of police affairs. They launched a crackdown on revolutionaries, ordering police to erase all street posters bearing the slogan "Over four thousand years since the Yellow Emperor" and replace them with notices bearing the reign year of Xuantong.

On the morning of December 10, Wu Bingxiang dispatched military police to conduct a sudden raid on the "Yichun Studio", a photography studio and clock-repair shop on the south side of the western end of Jing’er Road, in the Jinan commercial district, as well as the "Wanshunheng" foreign-goods shop on Wanzi Alley. Fourteen revolutionaries, including Liu Pulin and Du Jin, were arrested. Lan Shengjiu was beaten to death on the spot with rifle butts, and property from both shops was looted. This incident is historically known as the Yichun Studio Massacre.

==== Shandong Problem and Japanese infiltration ====
In 1914, after the outbreak of the First World War, Japanese troops landed on the northern Jiaodong Peninsula, surrounded Qingdao, and after fierce fighting took it from Germany. The treatment of Qingdao at the Paris Peace Conference in 1919 provoked fierce protests by Chinese students, known as the May Fourth Movement. After the Washington Conference of 1922, Japan returned Qingdao to China. In May 1928, during the Northern Expedition, the National Revolutionary Army passed through Jinan, where Japanese troops perpetrated the Jinan incident, killing the Chinese negotiator Cai Gongshi. In 1930 the Nationalist government made Qingdao a special municipality, and in the same year, through diplomatic negotiation, recovered Weihai from Britain.

==== Second World War and Chinese Civil War ====
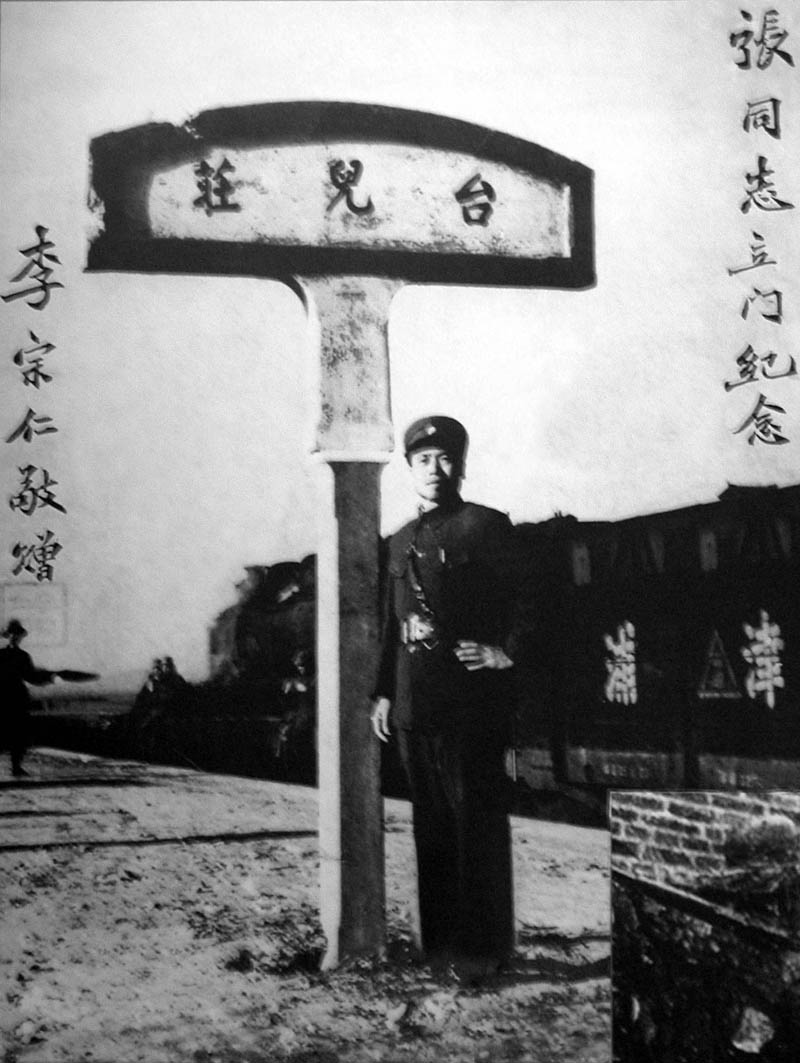
Li Zongren, commander at the Battle of Taierzhuang, with the roadsign in Taierzhuang

During the Second Sino-Japanese War (1937–1945), Japanese forces occupied Shandong's railways and cities, while the Communists established base areas in the countryside, such as Yimeng and Jiaodong. In 1938 Nationalist forces won the Battle of Taierzhuang in Shandong, their first major victory over Japan in the early stage of the war.

After Japan's surrender in 1945, the Communist Eighth Route Army controlled most of Shandong and established a provincial government in Linyi, while officials of the Chongqing government mainly took over the large cities. After the Chinese Civil War broke out, Nationalist forces captured some counties and cities. In May 1947 Chen Yi's East China People's Liberation Army annihilated the elite Nationalist 74th Division of Zhang Lingfu at Menglianggu. In November 1947 the Nationalist government held the first National Assembly election in the areas it controlled, followed in January 1948 by the election of the first Legislative Yuan. On 24 September 1948 Chen Yi's forces captured Jinan and took prisoner the provincial governor Wang Yaowu at Shouguang as he fled toward Qingdao. On 2 June 1949, after the United States military withdrew from Qingdao, the People's Liberation Army entered the city.

=== People's Republic of China ===
==== Turmoils of the Mao era ====
In the early years of the People's Republic of China, Pingyuan Province was created from western Shandong, northern Henan and southern Hebei, including present-day Heze and Liaocheng. The province was abolished in 1952 and its territory merged into Shandong and Henan. Xuzhou and Lianyungang in Jiangsu were also for a time under Shandong's jurisdiction. During the Great Chinese Famine of 1959–1961, Shandong was one of the worst-affected provinces, especially the Yellow River region of northwestern Shandong. According to official population statistics, Shandong's population fell by a net 2.34 million in 1959 and 1960.

On 25 August 1966, the "Qingdao Incident", a confrontation between cadres and workers on one side and students from Qingdao's three main colleges on the other, marked the start of the Cultural Revolution in Shandong.

==== Economic reform and developmemt ====
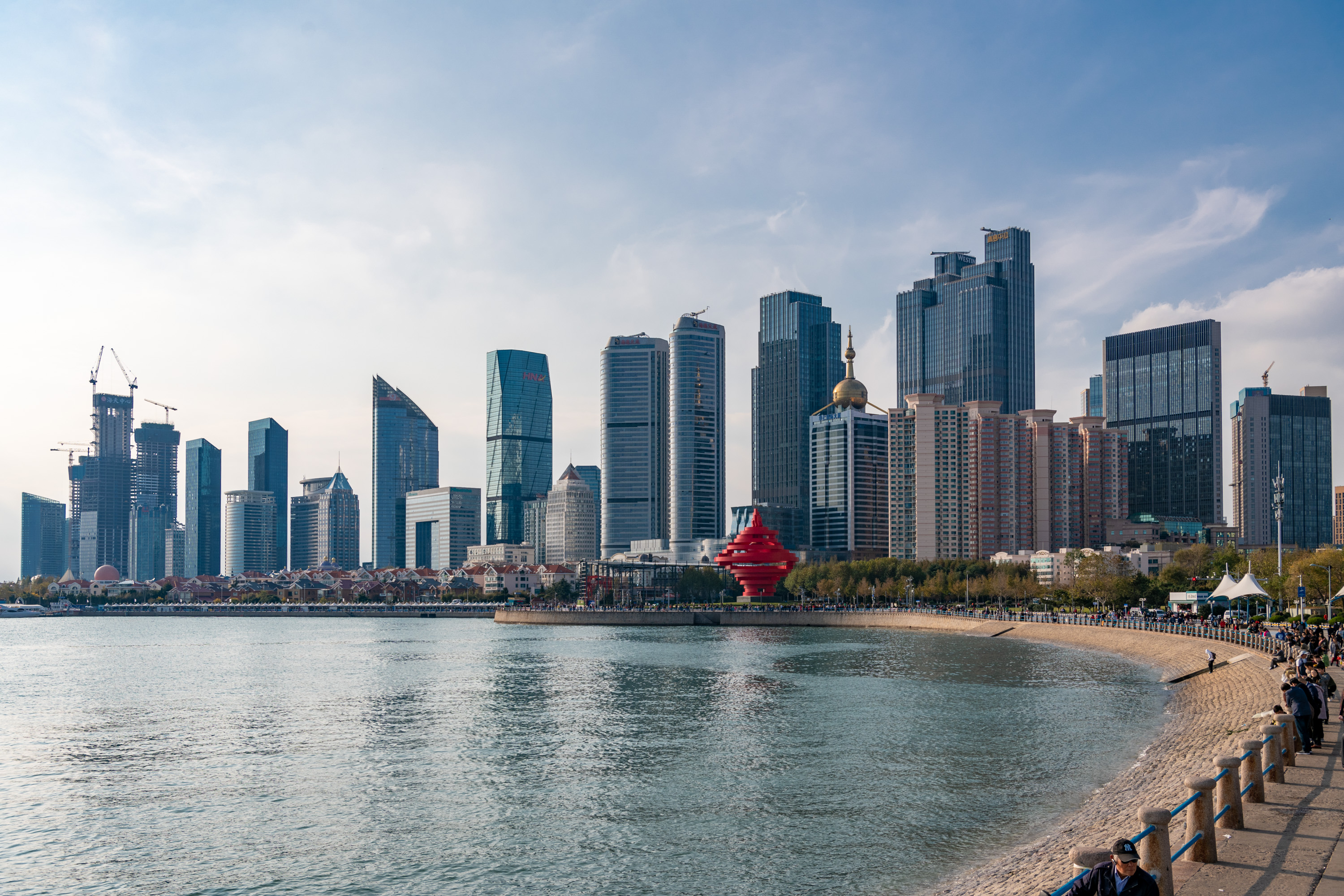
Skyline of Qingdao

After the reform and opening up of 1978, Shandong's economy, especially in the eastern coastal areas, developed considerably. In 1986 the total output of the province's township and village enterprises exceeded its agricultural output for the first time. In 2004 Shandong's industrial output and profits surpassed those of Guangdong for the first time, making it China's largest industrial province. In August and September 2008, Qingdao, as Beijing's partner city, hosted the sailing events of the 2008 Summer Olympics and 2008 Summer Paralympics. In 2009 Jinan hosted the 11th National Games of China. On 16 July 2010, during a visit to China by German Chancellor Angela Merkel, China's Ministry of Commerce and Germany's Federal Ministry of Economics and Technology signed a memorandum of understanding on jointly supporting a Sino-German eco-park, agreeing to build the Sino-German Ecopark in the Qingdao Economic and Technological Development Zone. In 2011 the development plan for the Shandong Peninsula Blue Economic Zone was approved. On 3 June 2014 the State Council formally approved the establishment of the national-level Qingdao West Coast New Area in Huangdao District.

== Bibliography ==
- An Zuozhang (安作璋) (December 2009). Wang Keqi; Wang Junlin (eds.). 山东通史 [General History of Shandong] (in Chinese). People's Publishing House. Volumes: Pre-Qin; Qin and Han; Wei, Jin and Northern and Southern Dynasties; Sui, Tang and Five Dynasties; Song, Jin and Yuan; Ming and Qing; Modern (2 vols.).
