= Laizhou church =

Christian church in Laizhou, China

Laizhou Church (formerly known as Yexian Church) is the Christian church in the county of Laizhou in Shandong Province, China.

== History ==
According to the records of United States missionaries in Shandong, Pastor Gary of the Presbyterian Church and Jesse Boardman Hartwell of the Southern Baptist Convention arrived in Laizhou in 1862. In a county fair they came across Zhong Ning, who was from the quarrying village of Ning located about four kilometres to the west of Laizhou, and preached to him: he was immediately converted to Christianity. Afterwards he went back to his village and founded a church. This is the earliest written record of the spread of Christianity in Laizhou. Later, due to the American Civil War, the Southern Baptist Convention hit economic difficulties, Pastor Hartwell left Shandong to work in Shanghai as a translator for a living, and the Presbyterian Church settled down in Ning from then on.

In 1865, Mateer and Hunter Corbett arrived in the state of Laizhou for missionary work and stayed there for a week.

In the late Qing Dynasty, 26th Guangxu (1900 Year), the American pastor John W Lowe bought a piece of land in Xiyingfang Village, where he built a four-story church. The top floor was used as a bell tower, commonly known as the awning floor (the address is now that of the Laizhou construction company). Inside, a church was set up, described as "Baptist". At the same time, to the south of the east road of the town's main crossroad, the Gospel Church was founded, where missionary work and preaching was held on Sundays. Later, the American pastor Lan Martin took it over. Lan Martin lived a long time (14 years) in Laizhou, developing believers, establishing schools, hospitals and orphanages. In 1926, Martin was succeeded by Johnson, and Johnson later by KeliPei (in Chinese Pinyin; the original English-language name is unidentifiable); both were Americans. The last priests were Lutheran (US) and Fanwu Wang (China). In 1942, the church was occupied by the Japanese invaders.

From 1906, at the current location of Laizhou Hospital, the construction of Meitie Hospital started, and was completed in 1908. It was reported that in the beginning, the construction was led by two Americans surnamed Meerfeld and Tieze, after whom the hospital was named. The hospital was divided into Meitie Male department and Ailin Female department, which was named after Katherine Melaury from the Southern Baptist Church. Both departments were equipped with beds. On the eve of the Japanese invasion and war, the Americans were transferred away, and thereafter the church was presided over by the doctor Lu Xianzhai (from Huang County) and his wife. It was destroyed at the end of the war.

Nowadays, the Laizhou County branch of the Three-Self Patriotic Movement of the Protestant Churches Committee in China rents the church located to the north of East Gate Street as a venue. This was originally built by the German Catholic priest Kaisiduo (possibly an early Chinese translation of Christoph) in 1902 or so (allegedly purchased as a private residence).
