= Huangxian =

Huang Xian or Huangxian may refer to:

- Huang County or Huang Xian, former name of Longkou, a city in Shandong, China
- Huangxian, Fenghua (黄贤村), a village in Qiucun (裘村镇), Fenghua, Zhejiang, China

== See also ==
- Huangxiang, a town in Jiangsu province
