= Port of Longkou =

Coordinates: 37°39′50″N 120°18′12″E

Port of Longkou 龙口港
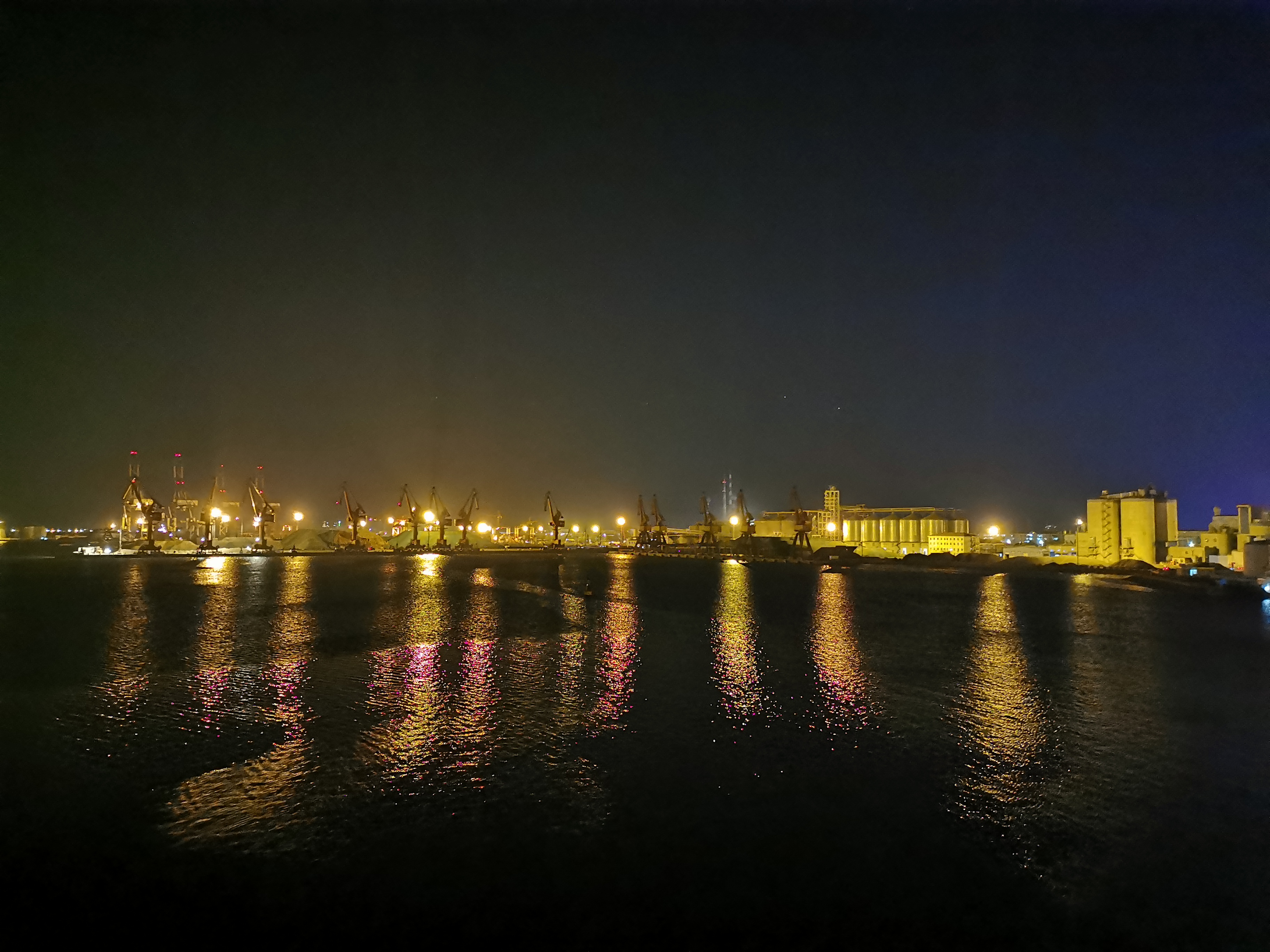
- Port of Longkou at night
- Interactive map of Port of Longkou 龙口港

Location
- Country: People's Republic of China
- Location: Longkou, Shandong Province

Details
- Opened: 1914
- Operated by: Longkou Port Group Corporation, Ltd. Co.
- Owned by: People's Republic of China
- Type of harbour: Artificial Deep-water Seaport
- No. of berths: 29
- Employees: 4,000

Statistics
- Annual cargo tonnage: 70.6 million tons (2013)
- Website; Port of Longkou website

The Port of Longkou is an artificial deep-water international seaport on the coast of Longkou, Yantai Prefecture, Shandong, People's Republic of China. It is located on the northern shore of Shandong Peninsula, opening to the Laizhou Bay of the Bohai Sea.

The port has been growing rapidly in the last decade, and it reached 70.6 million tons of total cargo throughput in 2013.

== History ==
The Port of Longkou was founded in 1914 by the Beiyang Government. The first concrete pier was built in 1918–19, a minor landmark in the history of Chinese harbor engineering.

== Layout ==
The jurisdictional area of the port is 170 km^{2}.

As of 2012, the Port of Longkou had 15,000 m of quayside and 29 production berths, of which 7 were capable of handling 100,000 DWT, 5 could handle 50,000 DWT, and 7 could handle 10,000 DWT. The main fairway has a depth of 15.5 m, width of 200 m, and it's capable of handling ships of up to 100,000 DWT.

== Administration ==
While located in Yantai Prefecture, the Port of Longkou is administered independently from the Port of Yantai.
