= Xu Jingxin =

Chinese politician

- 徐鏡心
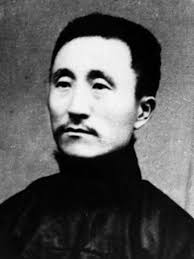
- Born: 10 December 1874; Huang County, Shandong, Qing dynasty
- Died: 14 April 1914 (aged 39); Beijing, Republic of China
- Cause of death: Execution by shooting
- Political party: Kuomintang (1912–1914)
- Other political affiliations: Tongmenghui (1905–1912)

Xu Jingxin
- Chinese: 徐鏡心
Transcriptions
Standard Mandarin
- Hanyu Pinyin: Xú Jìngxīn
- Wade–Giles: Hsü2 Ching4-hsin1

Zijian
- Traditional Chinese: 子鑑
- Simplified Chinese: 子鉴
Transcriptions
Standard Mandarin
- Hanyu Pinyin: Zǐjiàn
- Wade–Giles: Tzu3-chien4

Xu Jingxin (Chinese: 徐鏡心; pinyin: Xú Jìngxīn; 10 December 1874－14 April 1914) was a Chinese politician and an early political figure in the founding period of the Republic of China. He served as the principal leader of the Shandong branch of the Tongmenghui and as chairman of the Kuomintang Shandong branch.

== Biography ==
Xu Jingxin was born on December 10, 1874, in Houxujia Village, Huang County, Dengzhou Prefecture, Shandong into a wealthy landlord family. His father Xu Desheng ran a firm called “Dong Fu Xing Shun.” Xu entered a private school at age 5, and by age 20 he had become a county licentiate. In 1901, feeling that traditional learning was “not sufficient for practical use,” he entered Yantai Yucai School to study Western learning, and in 1902 transferred to Shandong University.

In 1903 he went to Japan and studied law at Waseda University. In 1905 he met Sun Yat-sen and joined the Tongmenghui, then appointed North China Branch Minister and the leader in Shandong. Returning to China in 1906, he founded Dongmu School in Yantai, which became a revolutionary hub for Jiaodong Peninsula and even Shandong as a whole. During this period he also traveled alone to Liaodong, Fengtian, and Jilin to support the revolution.

In 1910, Xu returned to Jiaodong to organize revolutionary activities. After the Wuchang Uprising broke out in October 1911, he quickly organized an uprising in Shandong. Together with figures such as Ding Weifen, he drafted seven points for a Shandong independence outline in Jinan, forcing the Shandong governor Sun Baoqi to announce Shandong's independence on November 13. However, because Sun Baoqi was secretly coordinating with the Qing court, he announced the cancellation of Shandong's independence shortly afterward. Xu fled to Shanghai to avoid danger, and soon went to Yantai.

On January 15, 1912, Xu, together with Qiu Pizhen and Lian Chengji, dispatched troops from Dalian. Overnight they crossed the Bohai Strait to seize Dengzhou, and the next day established the Shandong Military Government. After taking Dengzhou, Xu immediately sent troops west to attack Huang County and Laizhou.

In August 1912, the Tongmenghui reorganized into the Kuomintang. At the end of that year, Xu was elected a senator in the national parliament, and in 1913 went to Beijing to take office. After Song Jiaoren was assassinated on March 20, 1913, Xu impeached Yuan Shikai in the Senate. On March 15, 1914, Yuan instructed the military court to fabricate evidence and had Xu arrested and imprisoned. On the morning of April 14, Xu was executed. His body was later transported back by his eldest son Xu Huanzhang and others to be buried in his native place in Huang County. On June 10, 1936, the Kuomintang's Fifth National Congress passed a resolution; the Nanjing National Government posthumously awarded Xu the rank of Army General, held a state funeral, and buried him in the Xinhai Revolution Martyrs’ Cemetery at Thousand Buddha Mountain in Jinan.
