= Laizhou Bay =

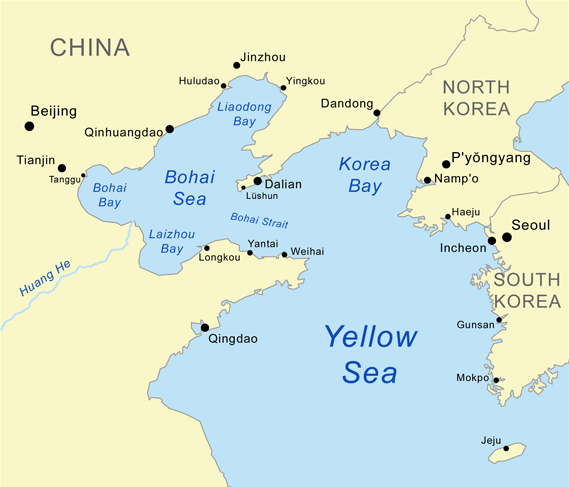

- Location within China
- Coordinates: 37.47°N 119.43°E
- Type: Bay
- River sources: Yellow River
- Ocean/sea sources: Pacific Ocean
- Basin countries: China
- Surface area: 7,000 km^{2} (2,700 sq mi)

Laizhou Bay (simplified Chinese: 莱州湾; traditional Chinese: 萊州灣; pinyin: Láizhōu Wān) is a bay on the southern shore of the Bohai Sea (also known as the Bohai Gulf, or just Bo Hai, which is a large and relatively shallow westward extension of the northern Yellow Sea), bounded by the northwestern coastline of the Shandong Peninsula west of the Port of Longkou and the eastern coastline of Dongying south of the Yellow River estuary. It is named after the county-level city of Laizhou to its east, and is the smallest of the three main bays of the Bohai Sea (the other two being the Liaodong Bay to the north, and the Bohai Bay to the west).

== See also ==
- Laizhou
