= Pugu =

Pugu may refer to:

- Pugu (state) or people of ancient China
- Pugu, tribe of the Tiele people
- Pugu (deity) of the Yukaghir
- Pugu Huai'en, a general of the Tang Dynasty
- Pugu Hills, a geographical region of Tanzania
  - Pugu, Tanzania, a small town in the Pugu Hills
  - Pugu Hills Forest Reserve, a nature reserve in the Pugu Hills
- Pugu tarkvara, an Estonian web-based software for businesses in the social welfare sector
