= Rongcheng =

Rongcheng may refer to:

- Rong Cheng Shi (容成氏), a bamboo manuscript recovered in 1994
- Rongcheng, Shandong (荣成市), county-level city in Weihai, Shandong, China
- Rongcheng County (容城县), county in Baoding, Hebei, China
- Rongcheng District (榕城区), district in Jieyang, Guangdong, China
- Rongcheng, Hubei (容城镇), a town in Jianli County, Jingzhou, Hubei, China
- An alternative name (蓉城) for Chengdu, Sichuan, China
- An alternative name (榕城) for Fuzhou, Fujian, China
- An alternative name (榕城) for the Taipei Municipal Datong High School, a high school in Zhongshan District, Taipei, Taiwan
- Chengdu Rongcheng F.C., a football club in Chengdu, China
