= Longkou =

Longkou 龙口市 Lungkow
- County-level city
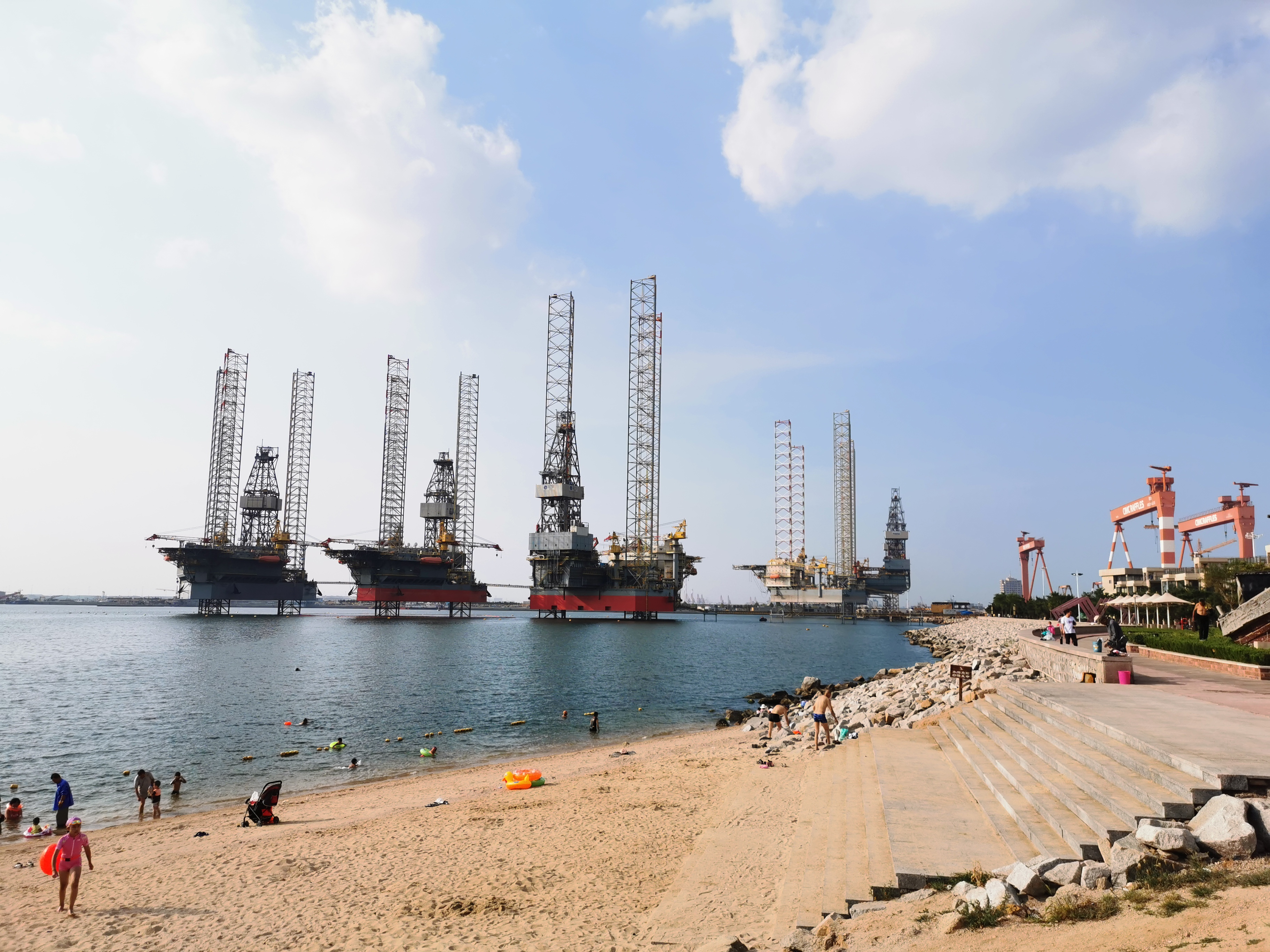
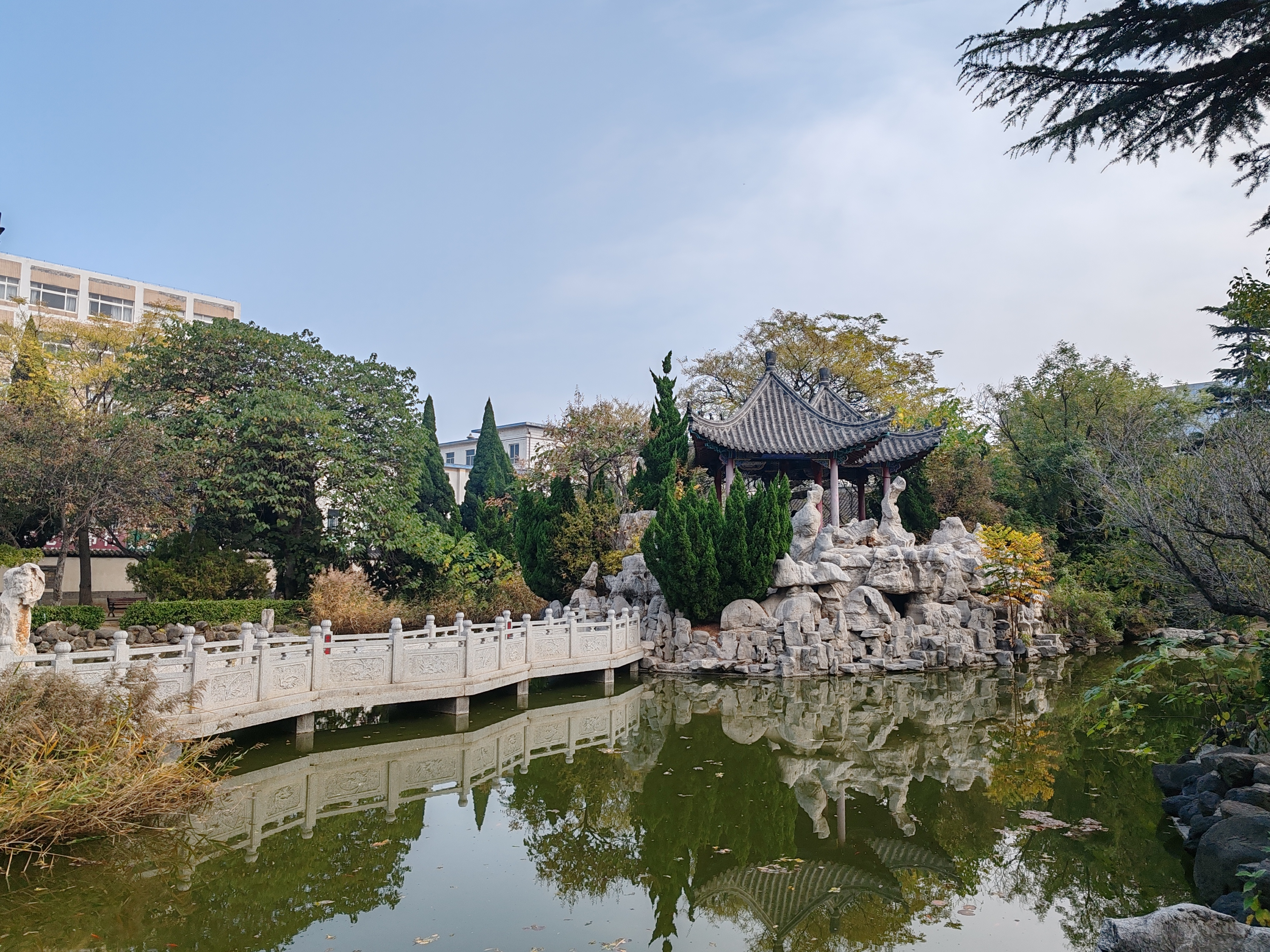
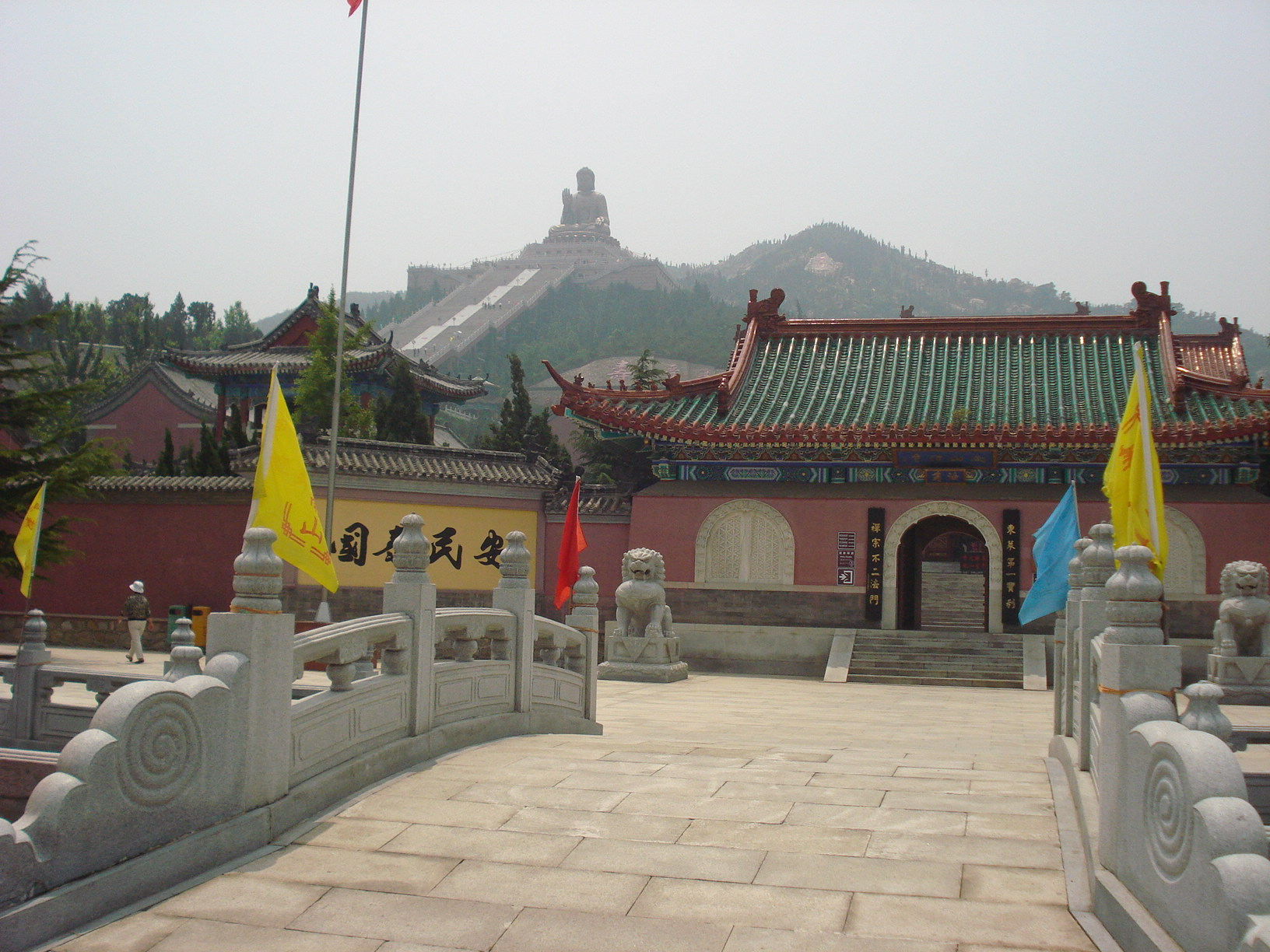
- Longkou Port Ding Family's Mansion City Hall Nanshan Temple

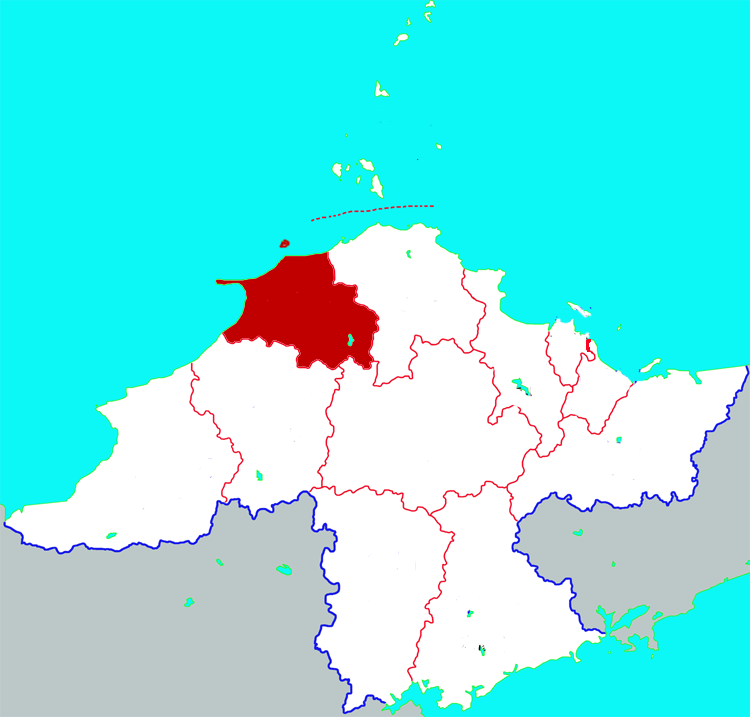
- Location in Yantai

- Location in Shandong
- Coordinates: 37.657°N 120.491°E
- Country: People's Republic of China
- Province: Shandong
- Prefecture-level city: Yantai
- Township-level divisions: 5 subdistricts 8 towns
- Municipal seat: Xinjia Subdistrict (新嘉街道)

Area
  - Total: 901 km^{2} (348 sq mi)

Population (2018)
  - Total: 635,839
  - Density: 706/km^{2} (1,830/sq mi)
- Time zone: UTC+8 (China Standard)
- Postal code: 265700

Longkou (simplified Chinese: 龙口; traditional Chinese: 龍口; pinyin: Lóngkǒu), formerly Huang County (simplified Chinese: 黄县; traditional Chinese: 黃縣; pinyin: Huáng Xiàn), is a port city in northeastern Shandong province, China, facing the Bohai Sea to the north and the Laizhou Bay to the west. Longkou, a county-level city, is administered by the prefecture-level city of Yantai. It is located in the northwest of Jiaodong Peninsula and the south bank of Bohai Bay, adjacent to Penglai District in the east, Qixia City and Zhaoyuan City in the south, Bohai Sea in the west and north, and facing Tianjin and Dalian across the sea. With a total area of 901 square kilometers, the city has jurisdiction over 5 subdistricts, 8 towns and 1 high-tech industrial park.

Longkou has been awarded many honors, such as National Civilized City, China Excellent Tourist City, National Health City, National Green Model City, National Garden City, National Sustainable Development Experimental Zone, National Ecological Protection and Construction Demonstration Zone, and provincial pilot county for transformation and upgrading of scientific development of county economy.

== History ==
Huang County was the center of the ancient Dongyi state of Lai during China's Zhou dynasty. Under the Qing, it was administered as part of Dengzhou (now Penglai).

Huang County was renamed Longkou in 1986.

== Administrative divisions ==
There are five subdistricts and eight towns under the city's administration:

Subdistricts:

- Donglai Subdistrict (东莱街道), Longgang Subdistrict (龙港街道), Xinjia Subdistrict (新嘉街道), Xufu Subdistrict (徐福街道), Dongjiang Subdistrict (东江街道)

Towns:

- Huangshanguan (黄山馆镇), Beima (北马镇), Lutou (芦头镇), Xiadingjia (下丁家镇), Qijia (七甲镇), Shiliang (石良镇), Langao (兰高镇), Zhuyouguan (诸由观镇)

== Geography ==
Longkou is a coastal harbour city adjacent to Penglai city and Yantai urban area to the east, linked to Qingdao to the south. Its administrative area (county-level city) covers 893 km^{2} (345 sq mi) and contains a coastline of 68.4 km (42.5 mi).

The city can be roughly divided into four major built-up areas: a central urban area, Longkou harbour city, Donghai and Nanshan.

At the west coast of Longkou, there is one of China's largest land reclamation projects under development. It will encompass six artificial islands with an extent of approx. 10 to 10 km.

Longkou is quite mountainous in the south and flat plains to the north. It has with low hills in the southeast and littoral plains in the northwest. There are mountains and rivers surrounding Longkou. The annual average temperature within the city is 11.7 °C. Although longkou has pleasant temperature in summer, it could be extremely cold during winter

== Climate ==
Climate data for Longkou, elevation 5 m (16 ft), (1991–2020 normals, extremes 1981–present)
Month	Jan	Feb	Mar	Apr	May	Jun	Jul	Aug	Sep	Oct	Nov	Dec	Year
Record high °C (°F)	15.3 (59.5)	21.0 (69.8)	27.8 (82.0)	33.1 (91.6)	36.5 (97.7)	39.2 (102.6)	38.1 (100.6)	37.5 (99.5)	33.3 (91.9)	30.1 (86.2)	25.0 (77.0)	19.5 (67.1)	39.2 (102.6)
Mean daily maximum °C (°F)	2.4 (36.3)	4.9 (40.8)	10.8 (51.4)	18.2 (64.8)	24.1 (75.4)	28.2 (82.8)	30.3 (86.5)	29.5 (85.1)	25.8 (78.4)	19.7 (67.5)	12.0 (53.6)	5.0 (41.0)	17.6 (63.6)
Daily mean °C (°F)	−1.2 (29.8)	0.6 (33.1)	5.9 (42.6)	12.9 (55.2)	19.1 (66.4)	23.5 (74.3)	26.4 (79.5)	25.8 (78.4)	21.7 (71.1)	15.5 (59.9)	8.1 (46.6)	1.6 (34.9)	13.3 (56.0)
Mean daily minimum °C (°F)	−4.2 (24.4)	−2.9 (26.8)	1.9 (35.4)	8.5 (47.3)	14.6 (58.3)	19.3 (66.7)	22.9 (73.2)	22.5 (72.5)	17.8 (64.0)	11.6 (52.9)	4.6 (40.3)	−1.4 (29.5)	9.6 (49.3)
Record low °C (°F)	−17.1 (1.2)	−15.1 (4.8)	−10.6 (12.9)	−5.0 (23.0)	1.9 (35.4)	8.5 (47.3)	12.6 (54.7)	14.1 (57.4)	6.7 (44.1)	−0.5 (31.1)	−5.6 (21.9)	−9.4 (15.1)	−17.1 (1.2)
Average precipitation mm (inches)	7.5 (0.30)	11.6 (0.46)	13.1 (0.52)	25.5 (1.00)	53.6 (2.11)	68.3 (2.69)	156.7 (6.17)	140.9 (5.55)	50.0 (1.97)	28.9 (1.14)	27.0 (1.06)	13.5 (0.53)	596.6 (23.5)
Average precipitation days (≥ 0.1 mm)	3.8	3.3	3.4	4.9	6.8	7.3	9.9	9.3	5.9	5.6	5.2	5.4	70.8
Average snowy days	6.0	3.9	1.5	0.1	0	0	0	0	0	0.1	1.7	6.8	20.1
Average relative humidity (%)	63	61	55	54	58	65	75	78	69	63	63	62	64
Mean monthly sunshine hours	178.0	186.8	243.9	255.3	282.3	260.7	230.2	233.1	232.3	221.7	169.6	161.0	2,654.9
Percentage possible sunshine	58	61	65	65	64	59	52	56	63	65	56	54	60
Source: China Meteorological Administrationall-time August record

== Economy ==
Longkou is well known for its production of cellophane noodles, it is home to the New Dragon Asia Corporation head office as well as the Nanshan Group, an industrial conglomerate. Longkou is a port city with an international deep-water cargo port. It handles over 70.000 tons annually.

There is also a number of smaller industrial companies, such as Longkou Beer Equipment Co.

In 2021, the regional GDP and general public budget revenue of Longkou City reached 123.66 billion yuan and 11.2 billion yuan respectively, with an annual growth rate of 6.7% and 5% respectively.

== Transport ==
Longkou is linked to the national expressway network of China via the G18 expressway (Weifang-Yantai) and the new S19 provincial expressway Longkou-Qingdao. There will be a highspeed rail connection via Weifang, currently this is still under construction. The closest airport is Yantai airport, about one hour east of Longkou.

Within the territory of the DaLailong Railway, Longyan railway and other railway trunk.

== Education ==
Longkou is home to Yantai Nanshan University (烟台南山学院), a private university offering bachelor's and master's degrees and to a bilingual (Chinese-English) high school.

== See also ==
- Yantai
- Cellophane noodles
