= Tai Jiang =

Wife of King Tai of Zhou

Tai Jiang 太姜
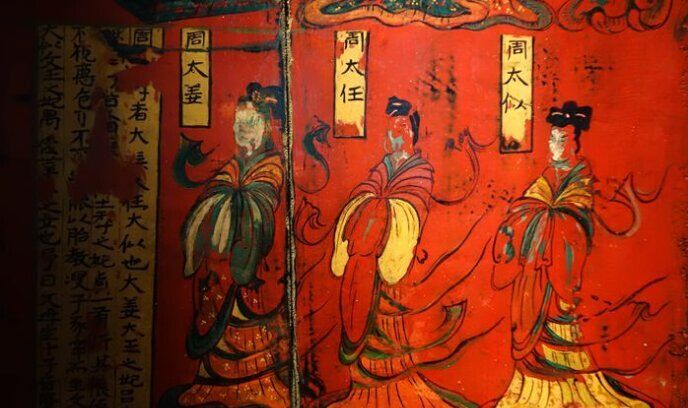
- Northern Wei depiction of Tai Jiang, Tai Ren, and Tai Si (c. 5th Century).

Queen of the Predynastic Zhou
- Predecessor: Jiang Yuan
- Successor: Tai Ren
- Born: c. 12-11th Century BCE; Youtai clan (有台氏)
- Spouse: King Tai of Zhou
- Issue: King Ji of Zhou; Taibo; Zhongyong of Wu

Chinese name
- Chinese: 太姜
Transcriptions
Standard Mandarin
- Hanyu Pinyin: tài jiāng
Middle Chinese
- Middle Chinese: thajH kjang
Old Chinese
- Baxter–Sagart (2014): /*l̥ˤa[t]-s C.qaŋ/
- Zhengzhang: /*tʰaːds klaŋ/

Tai Jiang was the consort of King Tai of Zhou. Along with Jiang Yuan and Tai Ren, she is credited as one of several queens instrumental to the success of the Predynastic and Western Zhou people.

== Name ==
Kong Yingda's commentary on the Classic of Poetry describes Tai (太) as a post-marital appellation given to a consort in Zhou culture. This would make the Jiang in Tai Jiang's name her birth name.

In the Classic of Poetry, Tai Jiang is referred to as Jiang Nü (姜女) in Mian, and Zhou Jiang in Si Qi (周姜).

== Life ==
Tai Jiang was married to King Tai of Zhou whilst he resided in Bin. She bore three children: Taibo, Zhongyong, and Ji Li.

In Lienü Zhuan, Liu Xiang records Tai Jiang as being a member of the Youtai clan (有台氏). Her integrity and obedience allowed her to lead the Zhou, and when King Tai was moving the capital to the City of Qi (岐邑), he always consulted with her about the matter. This event is recounted in Mian (緜) in the Classic of Poetry, where Tai Jiang is described as pointing out potential areas for the Zhou to settle. Junzi regarded her as an example of moral, charismatic authority and education. She is therefore grouped under the Three Mothers of Zhou, alongside Tai Si and Tai Ren.

== Legacy ==
All three of Tai Jiang's children are remembered for their successes in statecraft. Taibo was claimed by Japanese people as a state progenitor during the times of Cao Wei and the Jin dynasty; Zhongyong was considered a progenitor of the kings of the State of Wu; and King Ji of Zhou was instrumental in the burgeoning success of the Predynastic Zhou. King Ji, being the youngest of the three, would ascend the throne of the Predynastic Zhou out of tradition.

Mencius, in his eponymous book, pays attention to Mian (緜) in the Classic of Poetry in how it describes Tai Jiang. On two occasions, rulers came to Mencius about their lust for women: King Xuan of Qi and King Hui of Liang. To both, Mencius mentions that by allowing the people to enjoy the same feeling he does, there will be no unwedded men or women. Therefore, to Mencius, it is possible for a ruler to be a lover of beautiful women, taking their concubines around, and still being successful, so long as they do not chastise their people for doing the same.
