= Tai Ren =

Wife of King Ji of Zhou

Tai Ren 太任
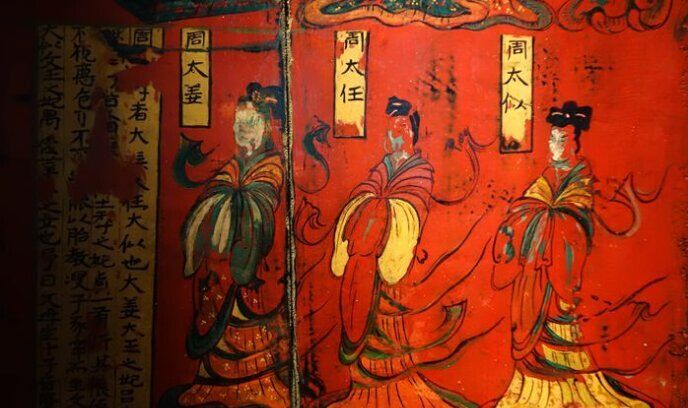
- Northern Wei depiction of Tai Jiang, Tai Ren, and Tai Si (c. 5th Century).

Queen of the Predynastic Zhou
- Predecessor: Tai Jiang
- Successor: Tai Si
- Born: c. 12-11th Century BCE; Zhi (摯), Late Shang
- Spouse: King Ji of Zhou
- Issue: King Wen of Zhou

Chinese name
- Chinese: 太任
Transcriptions
Standard Mandarin
- Hanyu Pinyin: tài rèn
Middle Chinese
- Middle Chinese: thajH nyimH
Old Chinese
- Baxter–Sagart (2014): /*l̥ˤa[t]-s n[ə]m-s/
- Zhengzhang: /*tʰaːds njɯms/

Tai Ren was the wife of King Ji of Zhou during the Shang dynasty. Along with Jiang Yuan and Tai Jiang, she is credited by Han dynasty historian Sima Qian as one of several women responsible for the success of the Predynastic Zhou.

== Name ==
Kong Yingda's commentary on the Classic of Poetry records Tai Ren's name as a combination of a post-marital appellation in Tai (太), and Ren (任) as her birth name. Her name is sometimes written as "Da" Ren (大任), such as in the Classic of Poetry, but this is a common variant of Tai (太) and retains the same pronunciation.

== Life ==
The bulk of Tai Ren's life lies in posthumous accounts in the Chinese classics. Kong Yingda, researching ambiguously-worded "clans" assigned to her in the Classic of Poetry (Zhizhong-shi 摯仲氏) and Lienü Zhuan (Zhiren-shi 摯任氏), concludes that the zhong in the Classic of Poetry is denoting her the middle child of a noble family in Zhi at the time of her marriage to King Ji of Zhou, and ren as her name, and so she must have been from a place called Zhi (摯) under Shang dynasty influence, given broader context in the poems.

Da Ming in the Classic of Poetry records Tai Ren as being from Zhi during the Late Shang period, stating she was from Zhi, and was wedded to King Ji of Zhou as his principal wife, at the time the "Overlord of the West" (西伯). In Si Zhai, Tai Ren is described as participating in the Zhou state religion, paying respects to her ancestors and thus preventing calamity from afflicting the Zhou people. Liu Xiang records Tai Ren as only cultivating her moral faculty, being upright, sincere, and dignified. When pregnant, she would avoid unpleasant sights, not listen to lewd words, and her words would not err; Liu presented this as an example of prenatal education, aiding the success of an unborn child. Whilst urinating in a pigsty, she gave birth to King Wen of Zhou, who would go on to begin a rebellion against Di Xin; his son, King Wu of Zhou, would complete this at the Battle of Muye and begin the Western Zhou period. Shuo Yuan and Kongzi Jiayu record Confucius as crediting Tai Ren, along with King Ji of Zhou and Tai Si, as the foundation that allowed King Wen to develop so well.

== Legacy ==
Along with Tai Si and Tai Jiang, Tai Ren is credited as among the "Three Tais" (三太), exemplary women of the Zhou dynasty who helped their husbands succeed. In Lienü Zhuan, a compilation of famous women, Liu Xiang names them the "Three Mothers" (三母).
