= Taibo =

Legendary founder of the state of Wu

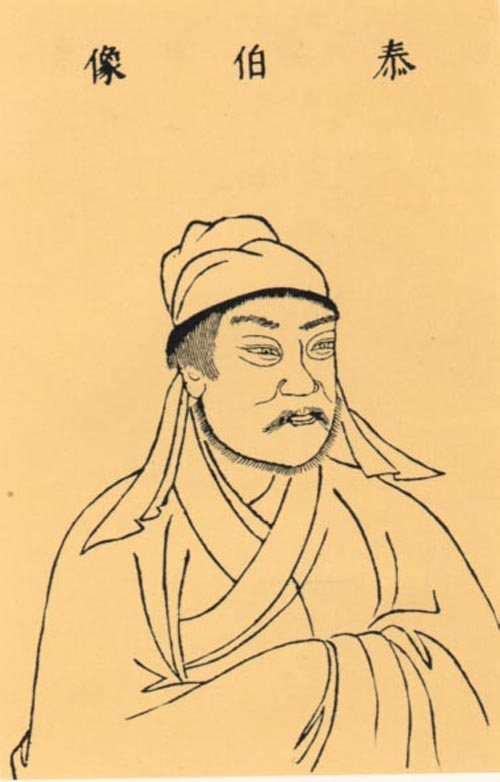
- Depiction in Sancai Tuhui, Ming dynasty.

Ruler of the State of Wu
- Predecessor: Position established
- Successor: Zhongyong of Wu
- Born: c. 1,200 BCE; Predynastic Zhou
- Died: State of Wu
Names
- Family name: Ji (姬)
Posthumous name
- (Wu) Taibo ((呉)泰伯)
- Father: King Tai of Zhou
- Mother: Tai Jiang

Taibo (Chinese: 泰伯 or 太伯; pinyin: Tàibó; Wade–Giles: T'ai-po) (circa 1150 BCE), or Wu Taibo, was the eldest son of King Tai of Zhou and the founder of the State of Wu. His exact birth and death dates are unknown.

== Name ==
Taibo (泰伯) is a posthumous name and not his original name; translated literally, it means "Great Senior (Amongst Brothers)," referring to him yielding the throne to King Ji of Zhou. Because he founded Wu, he is sometimes referred to as Wu Taibo (呉泰伯). His personal name is unknown, though because he was the son of King Tai of Zhou, his surname was almost certainly Ji (姬).

== Biography ==
=== Early life ===
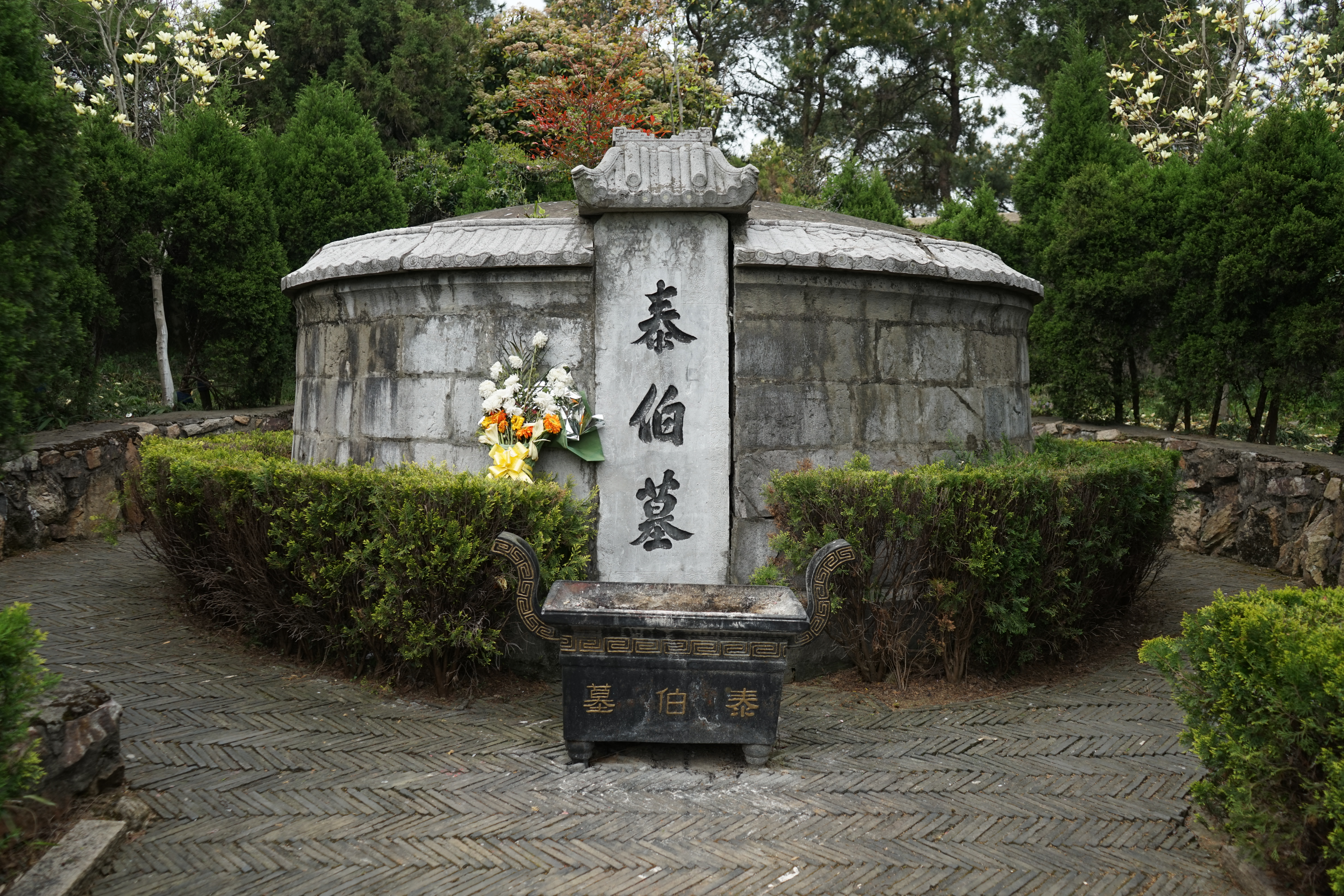
Taibo's tomb

According to Sima Qian, Taibo was the founder of the State of Wu. Born into the Jī clan (姬) of predynastic Zhou, Taibo was the eldest son of King Tai of Zhou. He had two younger brothers, Zhongyong and Jili. King Tai, following tradition, wished to make his youngest son Jili to inherit the reins of power, so Taibo and Zhongyong traveled southeast and settled in Meili in present-day Jiangsu Province. There, Taibo and his followers set up the State of Wu, and made Meili its capital.

Dong Zhongshu records in Chunqiu Fanlu that Taibo ruled with a supreme showing of moral and charismatic authority comparable to Shangdi. When moving to found the State of Wu, Lunheng by Wang Chong records Taibo as integrating into local society through cutting his hair and tattooing his body. The people of Wu would then wear hats and belts according to Taibo's appearance. During his reign over Wu, Taibo developed irrigation, encouraged agriculture, and dug Taibo River (泰伯瀆) which is called Bodu River (伯瀆河) today.

Upon the death of King Tai of Zhou, Taibo returned to Mount Qi, where the Zhou had moved during his reign. King Ji of Zhou attempted to abdicate the throne to Taibo, but Taibo declined. King Ji refused to accept this refusal, twice attempting to abdicate again. Upon the third refusal, Taibo declared that because he cut his hair and tattooed his body like those of Wu, he was a "mutilated" person and could not enter a ritual hall. King Ji weighed the situation and desisted.

When Taibo died, he had no heir and passed the throne to his younger brother Zhongyong.

== Legacy ==
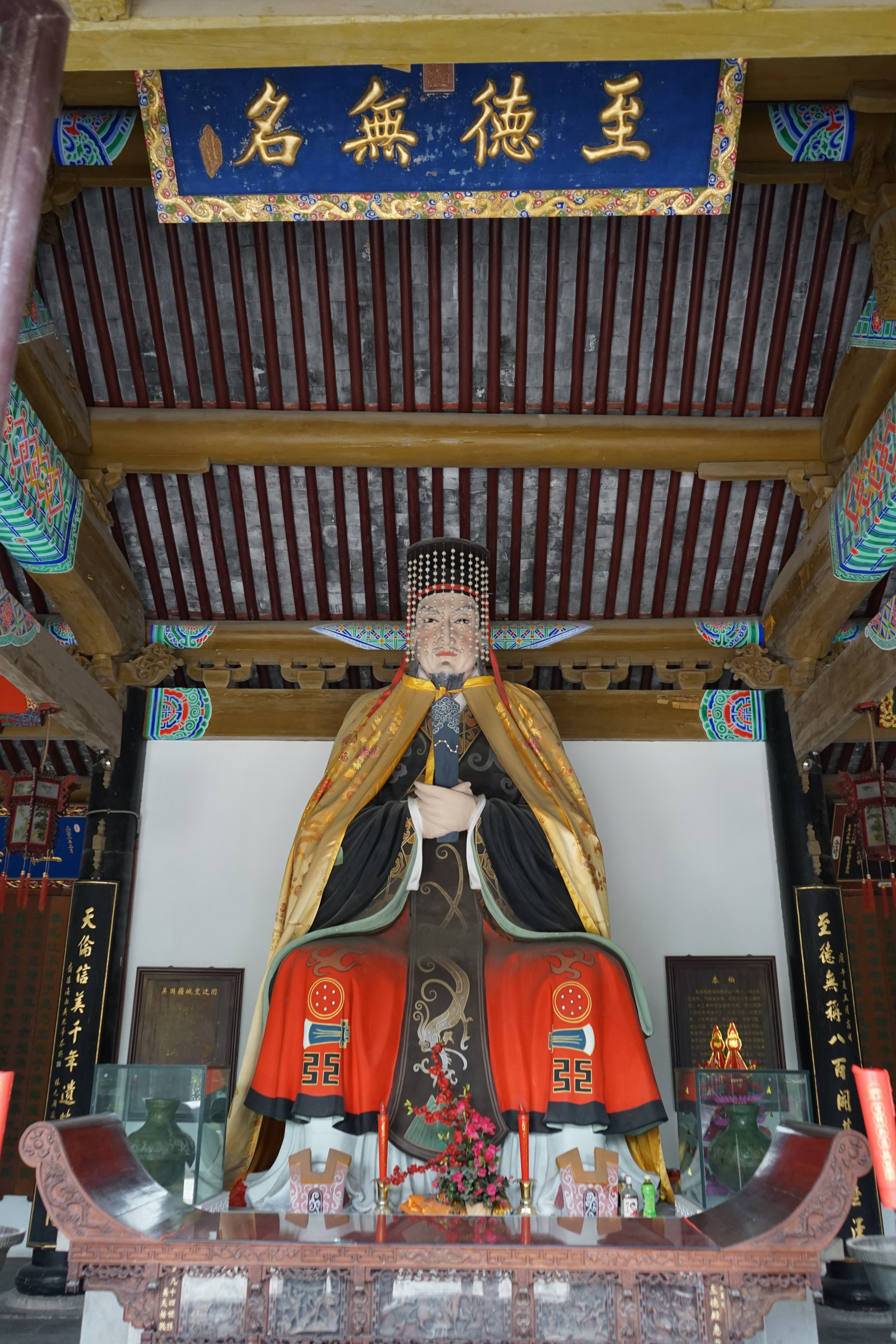
Taibo statue, Taibo Temple, Wuxi

Taibo's shrine was set up in today's Meicun. Although the original wood structure was destroyed during later wars, it has been renovated several times. Present architecture is mostly from the Qing dynasty. A stone carved with Confucius's comment can still be seen in today's Taibo Shrine. Taibo is also customarily known as the propagator of all people with the surname Wu 吳.

The Analects has a chapter named after Taibo, in which Confucius deems him a paragon of moral, charismatic authority, given his offerings of the throne of Wu to King Ji of Zhou.

Taibo's grand-nephew, King Wu of Zhou, overthrew the Shang dynasty at the Battle of Muye and started the Zhou dynasty. After the conquest of Shang dynasty, King Wu of Zhou found Zhouzhang, a great-grandson of Zhongyong, and made him the King of Wu.

=== Connection to ancient Japan ===
Ambassadorial visits to Japan by the later Chinese Cao Wei and Jin dynasties recorded that the Wajin people of Japan claimed to be descendants of Taibo of Wu. Several scholars suggest that the Yamato people and the imperial dynasty are descendants of the Wu ruling clan and possibly Taibo.
