= King Tai of Zhou =

Leader of the Predynastic Zhou

King Tai of Zhou 周太王
- Statue of King Tai at Zhouyuan Ruins (周原遗址)

Leader of the Predynastic Zhou
- Reign: c. 1158 BCE - c. 1126 BCE
- Successor: King Ji of Zhou
- Born: Ji Danfu (姬亶父); Bin, Predynastic Zhou
- Died: c. 1126 BCE; City of Qi (岐邑), Predynastic Zhou
- Spouse: Tai Jiang (太姜)
- Issue: Taibo; Zhongyong of Wu; King Ji of Zhou
Names
- Family name: Ji (姬); Given name: Danfu (亶父)
Temple name
- King Tai of Zhou (周太王)

Chinese name
- Chinese: 周太王
Transcriptions
Standard Mandarin
- Hanyu Pinyin: zhōu tài wáng
Middle Chinese
- Middle Chinese: tsyuw thajH hjwang
Old Chinese
- Baxter–Sagart (2014): /*tiw l̥ˤa[t]-s ɢʷaŋ/
- Zhengzhang: /*tjɯw tʰaːds ɢʷaŋ/

Alternative Chinese name
- Chinese: 古公亶父
Transcriptions
Standard Mandarin
- Hanyu Pinyin: gǔ gōng dǎn fù
Middle Chinese
- Middle Chinese: kuX kuwng tanX bjuX
Old Chinese
- Baxter–Sagart (2014): /*kˤaʔ C.qˤoŋ tˤanʔ [N-p](r)aʔ/
- Zhengzhang: /*kaːʔ kloːŋ taːnʔ baʔ/

King Tai of Zhou (Chinese: 周太王; pinyin: Zhōu Tài Wáng; lit. 'Great King of Zhou') or Gugong Danfu (Chinese: 古公亶父; pinyin: Gǔgōng Dǎnfù; lit. 'The Ancient Lord Father Dan') was a leader of the Predynastic Zhou during the Shang dynasty in ancient China. His great-grandson Ji Fa, King Wu of Zhou would later conquer the Shang and establish the Zhou dynasty.

== Name ==
"King Tai" is a posthumous name bestowed upon Danfu by his descendants. He was never styled as a king during his lifetime, instead being referred to as a gong (公), roughly translated as a Duke. He was earlier known as Gugong Danfu, for instance, in the Classic of Poetry. The Bamboo Annals refers to him as Danfu, Duke of Zhou (周公亶父).

Occasionally, he may be referred to as Ji Danfu, referencing his surname Ji (姬).

== History ==
=== Ancestry ===
In the family hymns recorded in the Classic of Poetry, the Ji family is traced from the miraculous birth of the Xia dynasty culture hero and court official Houji caused by his mother's stepping into a footprint left by the supreme god Shangdi. The Records of the Grand Historian instead makes Houji the son of the Emperor Ku, connecting his family to the Yellow Emperor who was sometimes also given the Zhou's surname.

King Tai was an eighth-generation direct male descendant of Qingjie.

=== Reign ===
Sima Qian records Houji's son Buzhu abandoning court life and his fief of Tai, apparently taking up the nomadic life of the Rong and Di tribes around Xia. His son Ju continued this before Duke Liu settled his people at a place called Bin (邠). Come King Tai, Sima Qian claims that he ruled with righteousness and accumulated a strong moral acumen during his rule, and was thus loved by his people. He would wed a wife in Tai Jiang, who would bear three sons: Taibo, Zhongyong, and Ji Li.

The prosperity of Bin under the rule of King Tai led to attacks from hostile peoples: the Rong, Di, and Xunyu (薰育 / 獯鬻). After four attempts to buy them off failed, King Tai refused to lead his people into battle and instead relocated his family to the foot of Mount Qishan in the Wei valley, believing that the invasions were due to his own failings as a ruler. After finding his choice confirmed by their oracle bones, the other people who had lived in Bin left the caves and huts they had fled to and followed them, erecting a new city complete with a formal palace, ancestral temple, and altar. The rapid success of the new location then caused neighbouring tribes of Yu and Rui – also affiliates of the Ji ancestral temple – to join Zhou, rather than attack.

The Bamboo Annals record King Tai as being enfeoffed in a City of Qi (岐邑) as Danfu, Duke of Zhou (周公亶父) during the 3rd year of Wu Yi of Shang. He would die in his 21st year. Zhou forces would attack Shang for 13 years thereafter, until the next ruler, King Ji of Zhou, paid homage to Shang during Wu Yi's 34th year.

== Legacy ==
King Tai was posthumously credited with much of the growth of the Zhou, receiving a hymn among the Great Odes of the Classic of Poetry and the "Mount Qi Song", a zither melody supposedly composed by the Duke of Zhou. In traditional Chinese records, he was considered to have himself created the state of Zhou, sometimes taken to be an indigenous place-name for his new settlement along the Wei River. Modern excavation of the Shang oracle bones have found references to a Zhou polity at least a century before this during the reign of Wu Ding (died c. 1192 BC). The earlier Zhou seems to be well away from the traditional locations for Bin, as well, leading scholars to posit a much longer migration west from Shanxi.

Multiple works in the Classic of Poetry recount events of King Tai's reign, such as the migration of the Zhou people and his attempts to appease the neighbouring nations in the poem Huang Yi (皇矣).

Upon his death, King Tai was succeeded by Ji Li, King Ji of Zhou, as part of a broader tradition in which the youngest of the ruler's sons succeed the throne. Taibo is sometimes claimed as a progenitor of Japan in Cao Wei and Jin literature, and Zhongyong is claimed as a progenitor of the kings of Wu.

== See also ==
- Zhou dynasty
- Ancestry of the Zhou dynasty

King Tai of Zhou Predynastic Zhou
Regnal titles
| Preceded by Gongshu Zulei | King of Zhou | Succeeded by King Ji of Zhou |
