= Taiwang =

Taiwang (Chinese: 太王; lit. 'Grand(est) King') may refer to:

- Taiwang, Jilin, a town in Ji'an, Jilin, China
- King Tai of Zhou or Taiwang of Zhou (fl. 12th century BC?), a leader of predynastic Zhou

== See also ==
- Taiwan
- Taewang, Korean equivalent of "Taiwang"
