= Religion of the Predynastic and Western Zhou =

- Western Zhou depiction of Tiān, the central focus in Zhou religion.
- Theology: Ancestral deification Shamanism; Worship of Shāng deities
- Language: Old Chinese
- Territory: Predynastic Zhou; Western Zhou
- Origin: c. 13th century BCE – 771 BCE

The religion of the Predynastic and Western Zhou was a complex set of religious beliefs and activities adhered to by the early Zhou dynasty in China (c. 13th century BCE – 771 BCE). Strongly influenced by the Shang dynasty's religion, it developed gradually throughout the Predynastic Zhou period and flourished during the Western Zhou period. The religion was characterized by inscriptions on bronze and oracle bones, detailed texts on rituals and divination, and the complex religious sites and institutions referred to in such writings.

The Zhou believed in a supreme deity similar to that of the Shang dynasty's Shàngdì, and named their god Tiān. Tiān was the center of the Mandate of Heaven, which was the source of kingly authority granted by divine will on Zhou rulers. Additionally, the Zhou held strong beliefs in the power of ancestors, who, as Western Zhou bronze inscriptions reveal, were seen as deities dwelling in Heaven. Some elements of the previous Shang beliefs was adopted, especially Shàngdì, who was somewhat conflated with Tiān. Divination by oracle bones was prevalent during the final years of Predynastic Zhou, corresponding with the late Shang period, and divination continued to exist during the Western Zhou with the compilation of the Classic of Changes. Rituals such as sacrifices remained important throughout the Western Zhou period, influencing the later Eastern Zhou's religious activities.

Studies of religion during this period often make use of bronze inscriptions, which were contemporary to the events they describe. Many bronze inscriptions document activities such as sacrifices, done by the Zhou kings. Aside from documentary sources, modern knowledge also comes from excavations of early Zhou sites, including the predynastic settlements in modern-day Shaanxi and early dynastic capitals. Together, they help augment findings about this ancient period in Chinese religious history.

== Beliefs ==
=== Tiān and the Mandate of Heaven ===
王若曰：「盂！丕顯文王受天有大令，在武王嗣文乍邦，闢氒慝，匍有亖方，畯正氒民。

The King [...] spoke: "Yu, the Greatly Manifest King Wen received Heaven's Aid and the Great Mandate. When King Wu succeeded King Wen and created the state, he cleared the land of those noxious presences and spread [the mandate] throughout the four regions, correcting their peoples. [...]"

— Excerpt from the Da Yu ding (dated c. 998 BCE), concerning the Mandate of Heaven.

Tiān 天 (Heaven) was the utmost power worshipped by the Zhou, associated with the concept of the Mandate of Heaven, the development of which is credited to them. It was interpreted as an entity ruling over lesser gods and humans, and as a source of both peace and catastrophes. The character for this power was first inscribed on Shang oracle bones; however, no evidence for a religious meaning of Tiān during the Shang was present. The first mentions of Tiān during the Zhou were from bronze inscriptions during the reign of King Cheng (11th century BCE). However, modern understanding of the belief in Tian, due to a lack of extensive divinatory records, is not as sufficient as that of Shang beliefs. Bronze inscriptions from the Western Zhou reveal the tradition of celebrating the divine origin of the Zhou state, whose conquest of the Shang was seen as fulfilling the will of Heaven. The Mandate of Heaven was, in Zhou perceptions, originally in possession by the Shang royal house, which loses its legitimacy to claim it due to the evilness of the last king Di Xin. Therefore, Heaven bestowed its Mandate upon men of worthiness, and in the Western Zhou case, King Wen of Zhou. King Wen was the sole recipient of the Mandate of Heaven acknowledged by bronze inscriptions, and no subsequent kings could establish themselves as recipients of the Mandate. Instead, they were sanctioned by divine will of Heaven to rule based on their genealogical relationship with King Wen and their own virtuous conduct. In other words, the Mandate and the favor of Heaven the supreme god was not only a source of legitimacy for rulers but also a fear of misconduct which might happen in the future.

The relationship between Zhou's Heaven and Shang's Dì was complex. Although it is obvious that the Zhou held in their mind the concept of a High God like Shàngdì, that Shang high god, as a component of the greater Dì, was not fully identical to Tiān. The difference between the two powers was that Shàngdì was a squared component which housed Shang royal ancestors, who were not able to support the Zhou rulers in their conquest of the Shang. According to Didier, the Zhou transition to Heaven was to convince the old Shang population that there existed a collective power at the celestial pole, which was Heaven to the Zhou and Dì to the Shang, the latter abandoning the Shang cause and the former supporting the new Zhou rulers. Therefore, Tiān and Dì was the same in that they both contain a subset, represented by square that comprises a part of two characters depicting the two powers: Shàngdì 上帝. There is also the case that Tiān and Dì coexisted with each other. Dì in this situation was seen as a power who hosted Zhou deceased ancestors who rose to his court, and acted as the patron of the living Zhou king. As such, while Tiān was sometimes described as a source of disasters and of destruction, Dì was mentioned as a guardian and never a cause of calamities on the Zhou.

=== Zhou and Shang royal ancestors ===
The Zhou ancestors were central to their beliefs, because they, as the collective Shàngdì which constituted Tiān, were directly related to the king's source of ruling authority. In fact, the divinity of Zhou ancestors could explain the honorary title bestowed upon kings. By interpreting the Western Zhou graph for Heaven as consisting of the character 大 ('great'), Herrlee Creel posited that this component of the graph means 'great men', Zhou ancestral spirits whose descendant was thus called Son of Heaven (天子; tiānzǐ), the son of the ancestral spirits who made up a part of Heaven itself (however, this title was rarely used during the Western Zhou period). The most often mentioned names in Western Zhou bronze inscriptions are King Wen and his son King Wu, who were regarded as founding fathers of the Zhou dynasty. Of the bronze artifacts containing texts, nine concern King Wu and seven other talk about King Wen. These mentions usually come with discourses on the Mandate of Heaven, suggesting a strong tie between that concept and the two early rulers. Some inscriptions refer to the two kings in a single phrase "King Wen and King Wu"; however, this diction appears only centuries after the death of the two kings, when the Western Zhou was gradually plunged into demise. As early as the early Western Zhou period, deceased kings had been seen as supervisors in the court of Dì who patrolled the conduct of living kings, as demonstrated by the text inscribed during the reign of King Wen's successor King Wu:

天亡又（佑）王，衣祀于王，不（丕）显考文王，事喜上帝，文王德才(在)上，不（丕）
显王乍省，不（丕）□(？)王乍庸。不（丕）克气衣王祀

Tian Wang aided the King, who then performed a grand sacrifice to the King’s great and brilliant father, King Wen, who pleases with service Dì, Lord on High. King Wen looks down from above. With the great and brilliant King surveying above, the great and upright King carried on below and brought to a grand close the sacrifice to his father.

— Tian Wang gui, inscribed during King Wu of Zhou's reign.

The Zhou also believed that their deceased founding kings possessed the 德; dé, which was the grace of Heaven bestowed on them to rule from the top. Also, in some occasions the ancestors were identified with Heaven itself and received according sacrifices.

The Predynastic Zhou, the Shang subordinate state which later founded the Zhou dynasty, embraced Shang religious beliefs, including the belief in power of Shang ancestors. Shang kings such as Di Yi, Tang, Wu Ding and Tai Jia were addressed in Predynastic Zhou oracle bone inscriptions, being regularly prayed to and offered sacrifices by the Zhou. The fact that the Predynastic Zhou adopted Shang spirits into their own recipients of religious honor suggests that the Predynastic Zhou was, before the fall of Shang, a state that accepted Shang suzerainty over them.

=== Natural spirits ===
Classical Chinese texts point out that the Western Zhou kings worshipped a range of natural spirits as a means of maintaining order. However, it actually seems that natural deities played only a minor role in the early Zhou's religion, and these spirits were not believed to influence political situations or the dynasty's destiny, even if they received special sacrifices.

== Written texts ==
=== Bronze inscriptions ===
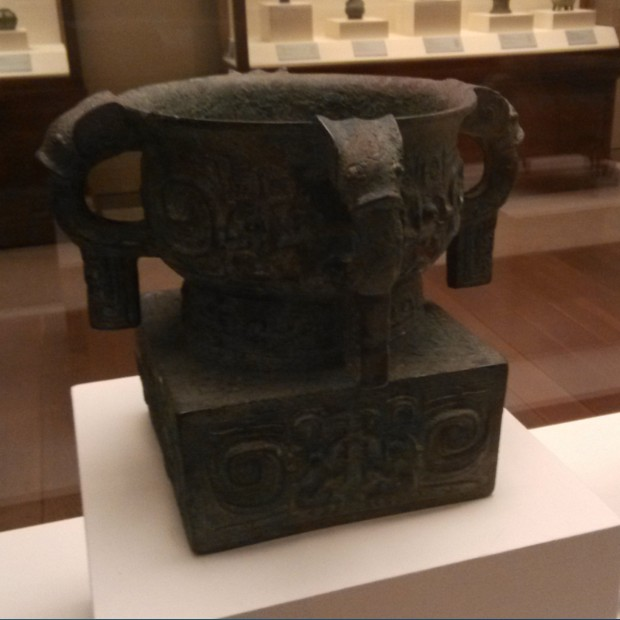
The Tian Wang gui, a Western Zhou bronze vessel.

Western Zhou bronze inscriptions offer a primary source of study for the religious practices and beliefs during the early dynastic course of Zhou. While they do record historical facts, their nature was rather religious, and they were created to serve in specific religious contexts. The inscriptions were cast into meticulously produced ritual vessels, which are described as “quite probably, the most accomplished, expensive, labor-intensive, and beautiful human-made things their owners and handlers had ever seen.” The bronze inscriptions were aesthetically shaped and contained rich rhetorical literature, and were highly selective in terms of the information they provided, serving the religious purposes of their owners. Western Zhou bronze inscriptions often record the Zhou king conducting ritual, waging a war, or handling internal affairs. The inscriptions are described as propagandistic in nature, recording only appropriate actions such as military victories. This phenomenon was a consequence of attempts for royal sub-lineages to form a common identity which includes their own legitimacy to rule. In other words, these inscriptions did not contain thorough historical facts but only what was relevant to Zhou royal authority and served the religious-political aims of the owners.

Bronze inscriptions of the Western Zhou account for the majority of all bronze inscriptions ever made in China. The Jinwen yinde lists 5758 different inscriptions on 9916 bronze artifacts, the most of which were produced during the Western Zhou. In most cases, the artifacts were used as sacrificial materials for multiple generations. It was estimated that the majority (70 – 80 %) of all inscriptions end with the phrase “may sons of sons, grandsons of grandsons, forever treasure and use [this sacrificial vessel]” (子子孫孫永用). The significance of writing in religious purposes is demonstrated in the fact that the Western Zhou restricted the use of non-perishable bronzes for religious texts, while writings on secular matters did not happen to be preserved in a similar way.

=== Oracle bone inscriptions ===
A large percentage of Zhou oracle bone inscriptions were created during the Predynastic Zhou, contemporary with the Late Shang state (c. 1250 – c. 1046 BCE). Most of the inscriptions produced date from the reign of the last Shang king, although the dates are still under debate. A small portion of the bones date to the early Western Zhou. These inscriptions, despite having a distinct style and calligraphy from those produced by the Shang workshops at Anyang, generally refer to divinatory records about sacrifices to Shang kings similar to the authentic Shang inscriptions. The bones unearthed at Zhouyuan include such SHang-related topics, in addition to other topics such as sacrifices to Zhou predynastic rulers. Another corpus of 600 bones were unearthed at Zhougong Miao 周公廟 near Qishan, Shaanxi, containing a list of figures in early Zhou history, including Jili, King Wen, brothers of King Wu, and the Duke of Zhou who was probably the one behind divinatory rituals described in Zhou oracle bones.

=== Book of Changes ===
The I Ching (易經), or Book of Changes was the most ancient text among the Chinese classics. The book is a collection of divination clusters, some of which probably formed during the Predynastic Zhou based on sources similar to the Zhouyuan oracular inscriptions. Each cluster starts with a hexagram mark similar to the Late Shang-early Western Zhou bronzes, explained by a statement. The statement itself is followed by six line statements tying to the hexagram formation. The I Ching's core text is the Zhouyi (周易), which probably was formed during the middle-to-late Western Zhou period, and more specifically to the late 9th century BCE, the early reign of King Xuan. The text was likely used as a divination manual during the Western Zhou, and continued to be rearranged until it reached the current form probably during the fourth century BCE.

=== Eulogies and hymns ===
The Classic of Poetry (詩經; Shījīng) contains poetic works from the Western Zhou, mainly hymns and eulogies. The sections dating to the Western Zhou are the Major Court Hymns (大雅; Dàyǎ; 9th – 8th centuries BCE), the Lesser Court Hymns (小雅; Xiǎoyǎ; 9th – 8th centuries BCE) and the Eulogies of Zhou (周頌; Zhōusòng; 11th – 10th centuries BCE), older than other sections which were composed later than the Western Zhou during the 8th and 7th centuries BCE. Most of the works in the Lesser Court Hymns and the Major Court Hymns were composed during the Western Zhou period, although some might have been written during the Spring and Autumn period. The Eulogies of Zhou are the oldest eulogies among those dedicated to the three first dynasties of China, and consists of songs created and sung during early Western Zhou ancestral rituals, with the very oldest ones probably dated to the Zhou conquest of Shang (c. 1046 BCE), and the youngest ones being much more recent. Some Western Zhou hymns and eulogies traditionally attributed to the early kings are actually late Western Zhou works for the purpose of commemorating the figures who they praised. These poems are possibly reconstructed images of the early ruler's speeches and deeds, connecting the past and present, with the purpose of honoring the characters in focus. These works of poetry contain a rich source of early Chinese literature, with various examples of highly romanticized poems and rhythmic dictions.

== Bibliography ==
- Li, Feng (2013). Early China: A Social and Cultural History. Cambridge University Press. ISBN 9780521895521.
- Didier, John C. (2009). "In and Outside the Square: The Sky and the Power of Belief in Ancient China and the World, c. 4500 BC – AD 200". Sino-Platonic Papers (192). Victor H. Mair. Volume I: The Ancient Eurasian World and the Celestial Pivot, Volume II: Representations and Identities of High Powers in Neolithic and Bronze China, Volume III: Terrestrial and Celestial Transformations in Zhou and Early-Imperial China
- Creel, Herrlee G. (1970). The Origins of Statecraft in China. The University of Chicago Press. ISBN 0-226-12043-0.
- Kern, Martin (2009). "Bronze Inscriptions, the Shijing and the Shangshu: The Evolution of the Ancestral Sacrifice during the Western Zhou". In John Lagerwey; Marc Kalinowski (eds.). Early Chinese Religion, Part One: Shang through Han (1250 BC–220 AD). Leiden/Boston: Brill.
- Harari, Yuval Noah (2015). Sapiens: A Brief History of Humankind. Translated by Harari, Yuval Noah; Purcell, John; Watzman, Haim. London: Penguin Random House UK. ISBN 978-0-09-959008-8. OCLC 910498369.
- Storm, Rachel (2011). Sudell, Helen (ed.). Myths & Legends of India, Egypt, China & Japan (2nd ed.). Wigston, Leicestershire: Lorenz Books.
- Cook, Constance A.; Goldin, Paul R. (2016), A Source Book of Ancient Chinese Bronze Inscriptions, Berkeley: Society for the Study of Early China
- Gao, Ming (1996), Zhongguo guwenzixue tonglun, Beijing: Wenxue chubanshe, ISBN 9787301022863
- Eno, Robert (2012), Inscriptional Records of the Western Zhou, Indiana University
- Kryukov, Vassili (1995). "Symbols of Power and Communication in Pre-Confucian China (On the Anthropology of De), Preliminary Assumptions". Bulletin of the School of Oriental and African Studies. 58 (2): 314–333. doi:10.1017/S0041977X0001079X.
- Shaanxi Zhouyuan Kaogudui 陝西周原考古隊 (1979), 陝西岐山鳳雛村發現周初甲骨文, 文物 (in Chinese) (10)
- Eno, Robert (2009). "Shang State Religion and the Pantheon of the Oracle Texts". In Lagerwey, John; Kalinowski, Marc (eds.). Early Chinese Religion: Part One: Shang Through Han (1250 BC-220 AD). Brill. ISBN 978-9004168350.
- Hsu, Cho-yun; Linduff, Katheryn M. (1988). Western Chou Civilization. New York and London: Yale University Press. ISBN 978-0300037722.
- Wang Jihuai 王吉懷 (1994), Zhongguo yuangu ji sandai zongjiao shi 中國遠古暨三代宗教史 (in Chinese), Beijing: Renmin chubanshe, ISBN 9787010017570
- Eno, Robert (1990), The Confucian Creation of Heaven: Philosophy and the Defense of Ritual Mastery, State University of New York Press, ISBN 978-0791401910
- von Falkenhausen, Lothar (1999). "Late Western Zhou state". Études Chinoises (Mélanges de Sinologie of erts à Monsieur Jean-Pierre Diény [1]). 18 (1–2).
- Xu, Zhongshu (1936). "Jinwen guci shili". Bulletin of the Institute of History and Philology. 6 (1).
- Shaughnessy, Edward (1983). The composition of the Zhouyi (Thesis). Stanford University.
- Rutt, Richard (1996). The Book of Changes (Zhouyi): A Bronze Age Document. Richmond: Curzon. ISBN 0-7007-0467-1.
- Smith, Richard J (2012). The I Ching: A Biography. Princeton: Princeton University Press. ISBN 978-0-691-14509-9.
- Knechtges, David R. (2014), ""Yi jing" 易經 [Classic of changes]", in Knechtges, David R.; Chang, Taiping (eds.), Ancient and Early Medieval Chinese Literature: A Reference Guide, vol. 3, Leiden: Brill Academic Pub, ISBN 978-90-04-27216-3
- Dobson, W. A. C. H. (1964). "Linguistic Evidence and the Dating of the Book of Songs". T'oung Pao. 51 (4–5): 322–334. doi:10.1163/156853264x00028. JSTOR 4527607.
- Baxter, William H. (1992). A Handbook of Old Chinese Phonology. Berlin: Mouton de Gruyter. ISBN 978-3-11-012324-1.
