= King Ji of Zhou =

Leader of Predynastic Zhou

King Ji of Zhou 周王季
- Ji (季) in bronze script.

Ruler of the Predynastic Zhou
- Reign: c. 1126 BCE - c. 1101 BCE
- Predecessor: King Tai of Zhou
- Successor: King Wen of Zhou
- Born: Predynastic Zhou
- Died: c. 1101 BCE; Late Shang
- Burial: Mount Guo (渦山)
- Spouse: Tai Ren
- Issue: King Wen of Zhou
- Father: King Tai of Zhou

Chinese name
- Chinese: 周王季
Transcriptions
Standard Mandarin
- Hanyu Pinyin: Zhōu Wáng Jì

Alternative Chinese name
- Traditional Chinese: 季歷
- Simplified Chinese: 季历
- Literal meaning: Youngest son Li
Transcriptions
Standard Mandarin
- Hanyu Pinyin: Jìlì

Personal name
- Traditional Chinese: 姬歷
- Simplified Chinese: 姬历
Transcriptions
Standard Mandarin
- Hanyu Pinyin: Jī Lì

Ji Li, King of Zhou was a leader of the Predynastic Zhou during the Shang dynasty of ancient China. His son King Wen and grandson King Wu would defeat the Shang to establish the Zhou dynasty. He was posthumously granted the title of king, and often referred to as Ji, King of Zhou.

== Name ==
King Ji's ancestral name was Ji. He was the youngest son of King Tai. Sima Qian recorded that Jili and his son were both renowned for their wisdom and this reputation caused his elder brothers Taibo and Zhongyong to renounce voluntarily their claims to the throne and to leave in exile to Wu.

== Reign ==
According to Sima Qian's Records of the Grand Historian, King Ji would be referred to as Ji Gong (公季) whilst on the throne.

The Bamboo Annals mention King Ji fairly extensively during the Late Shang period. In this portrayal, King Ji travels to the Shang capital to submit to Wu Yi and is rewarded with land, jade, and horses in 1118 BC. In 1117, he captured 20 "kings" of the Guirong tribes. During the reign of the Shang king Wen Ding, he was defeated by the Yanjing Rong but managed to subdue the Yuwu (余无), Hu (呼), and Xitu (翳徒) Rong. After the defeat of the Xitu tribe, Wen Ding became nervous and betrayed him, rewarding him richly before locking him up in a storehouse, starving him to death. King Ji's death caused his son Ji Chang to harbor hatred towards the Shang. However, the Zhou were still weak and must serve the Shang, Ji Chang only plotted revenge, which would be acted on by Ji Fa.

King Ji had a wife in Tai Ren. Tai Ren, along with Jiang Yuan (Note: mother of Jili's paternal ancestor Hou Ji), were credited by Sima Qian as two women responsible for the success of the Zhou. She came from a place called Zhi (摯) and represented some connection to the Shang royalty.

King Ji and Tai Ren had at least three sons. The eldest son was Ji Chang, King Wen, whose son Ji Fa, King Wu established the Zhou dynasty of China upon defeating the Shang at the Battle of Muye. The second eldest son was enfeoffed in Eastern Guo, also known as Guo Zhong (Note: i.e. "Second Son of Guo"), and the third eldest son in Western Guo, also known as Guo Shu (虢叔) (Note: i.e. "Third Son of Guo"), by their nephew King Wu.

Lüshi Chunqiu notes that King Ji had died in distress, and was buried at the foot of Mount Guo (渦山).

== Legacy ==
Jili is among several ancestors to receive sacrifices during the Western Zhou period. In oracle bones from the Ancestral Temple of Duke Dan of Zhou (周公廟), inscriptions such as the following are found:

其者（燎），其自王季。三月。
Should (we) perform a liao sacrifice? Maybe for King Ji? Third month.

The Classic of Poetry records three poems mentioning Wang Ji in the Greater Odes, specifically a section of ten dedicated to King Wen of Zhou. They record him as having a formidable moral faculty, being full of comradery for friends and brothers, and possessing judgement skills bestowed upon him by Shangdi itself.

Xu Shen records in Shuowen Jiezi an ancient state of Xia (陝) that would become the state of Western Guo, founded through the enfeoffment of one of King Ji's sons.

== Notes ==
King Ji of Zhou Predynastic Zhou
Regnal titles
Preceded by King Tai of Zhou	King of Zhou	Succeeded by King Wen of Zhou
