= Wu (state) =

State during the Spring and Autumn period

Wu 吳 *ŋʷˁa
- 12th century BC–473 BC
- Status: Kingdom
- Capital: Wu (modern-day Wuxi and Suzhou, Jiangsu province)
- Government: Monarchy
- Historical era: Zhou dynasty Spring and Autumn period
  - Foundation by Taibo: 12th century BC
  - Defeated by Yue: 473 BC
Succeeded by
Yue (state)

Wu
- "Wu" in seal script (top), Traditional (middle), and Simplified (bottom) Chinese characters
- Traditional Chinese: 吳
- Simplified Chinese: 吴
Transcriptions
Standard Mandarin
- Hanyu Pinyin: Wú
- Wade–Giles: Wu^{2}
- IPA: [ǔ]
Wu
- Suzhounese: Ng^{2} (col.); Ghou^{2} (lit.)
Yue: Cantonese
- Yale Romanization: Ngh
- Jyutping: Ng^{4}
- IPA: [ŋ]
Southern Min
- Tâi-lô: Ngôo
Middle Chinese
- Middle Chinese: Ngu
Old Chinese
- Baxter–Sagart (2014): *ŋʷˤa

Wu (Chinese: 吳; pinyin: Wú, Old Chinese: *ŋʷˤa) was a state during the Western Zhou dynasty and the Spring and Autumn period, outside the Zhou cultural sphere. It was also known as Gouwu (句吳) or Gongwu (工/攻吳) from the pronunciation of the local language. Wu was located at the mouth of the Yangtze River east of the State of Chu and south of the State of Qi. Its first capital was at Meili (梅里, in modern Wuxi), then Helü's City (闔閭, in present-day Xueyan town near Wuxi), and later moved to Gusu (姑蘇, probably in modern Suzhou). Wu's territory extended north to Xuzhou and Lianyungang, west to the Dabie Mountains, and south to the Lake Tai.

== History ==
A founding myth of Wu, first recorded by Sima Qian in the Han dynasty, traced its royal lineage to Taibo, a relative of King Wen of Zhou. According to the Records of the Grand Historian, Taibo was the oldest son of Gugong Danfu and the elder uncle of King Wen who started the Zhou dynasty. Gugong Danfu had three sons named Taibo, Zhongyong, and Jili. Taibo was the oldest of three brothers, Jili being the youngest. Realizing that his youngest brother, Jili, was favored by his father to inherit the throne of Predynastic Zhou, the older brothers Taibo and Zhongyong left Zhou to avoid conflict and settled southeast to Wu with a group of followers loyal to him and his brother Zhongyong. They established their first capital at Meili (梅里), believed to be today's Meicun in Wuxi. Taibo's youngest brother Jili who was eventually the heir of the throne became the father of King Wen, who is considered the founder of the Zhou dynasty.

Little is known about the history of Wu before the Spring and Autumn period. Wu rose to power in the 6th century BC, after it was aided by the State of Jin as a useful ally against the State of Chu.

In 584 BC, Wu rebelled against Chu upon the advice of Wuchen, a Jin minister, who defected from Chu. From then on, Wu would become a constant threat to the Chu Kingdom. Wu planted seeds of rebellion amongst Chu's vassals along the Yangtze valley. Wu Zixu, a highly influential Chu politician's father and brother were murdered by King Ping of Chu and fled to Wu plotting revenge. Wu Zixu later became a trusted advisor of Prince Guang and helped him assassinate his cousin King Liao of Wu in order to usurp the throne. After the successful assassination of King Liao, Prince Guang ascended the throne and became known as King Helü of Wu.

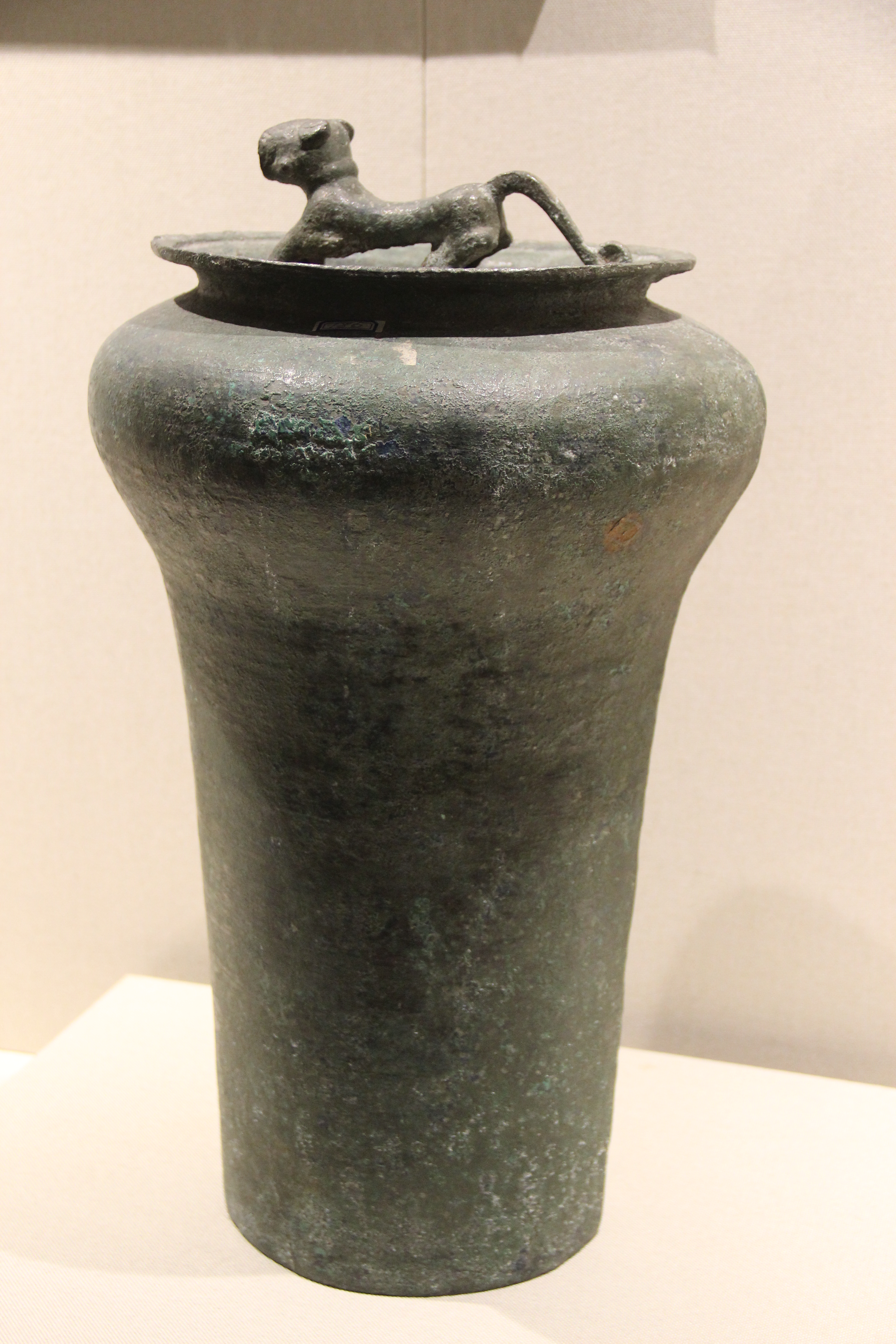
Wu Yue state, bronze Chunyi

In 506 BC, during the reign of King Zhao of Chu, King Helü decided to invade Chu. The king personally led the army, along with his younger brother Fugai, Wu Zixu, as well as Sun Tzu, author of The Art of War. Although Chu had a strong army led by Nang Wa and Shen Yinshu, it suffered a heavy defeat at the Battle of Boju. King Zhao of Chu fled to Sui and the Wu army captured Ying, Chu's capital. After entering Ying, Wu Zixu exhumed King Ping's corpse, and gave it 300 lashes to exact vengeance for his father and brother who were murdered by the Chu King. The military victory led to Wu Zixu's elevation to Duke of Shen and his alias Shenxu. After these victories, Wu briefly became the most powerful state and turned to other campaigns, defeating the State of Qi in 484 BC.

King Helü of Wu is considered to be one of the Five Hegemons of China during the Spring and Autumn period due to his military successes at this time with the help of his famous commander/strategist Sun Tzu. Wu is also generally regarded as developing the first Chinese navy. This navy was quite complex and had different classes of ships. Its "classes" of ships were the great wing (da yi - 大翼), the little wing (xiao yi - 小翼), the stomach striker (tu wei - 突冒), the castle ship (lou chuan - 樓船), and the bridge ship (qiao chuan - 橋船). These were listed in the Yuejueshu (越絕書 - Lost Records of the State of Yue) as a written dialogue between King Helü of Wu (r. 514 BC–496 BC) and Wu Zixu (526 BC–484 BC) in which the latter stated:

Nowadays in training naval forces we use the tactics of land forces for the best effect. Thus great wing ships correspond to the army's heavy chariots, little wing ships to light chariots, stomach strikers to battering rams, castle ships to mobile assault towers, and bridge ships to light cavalry.

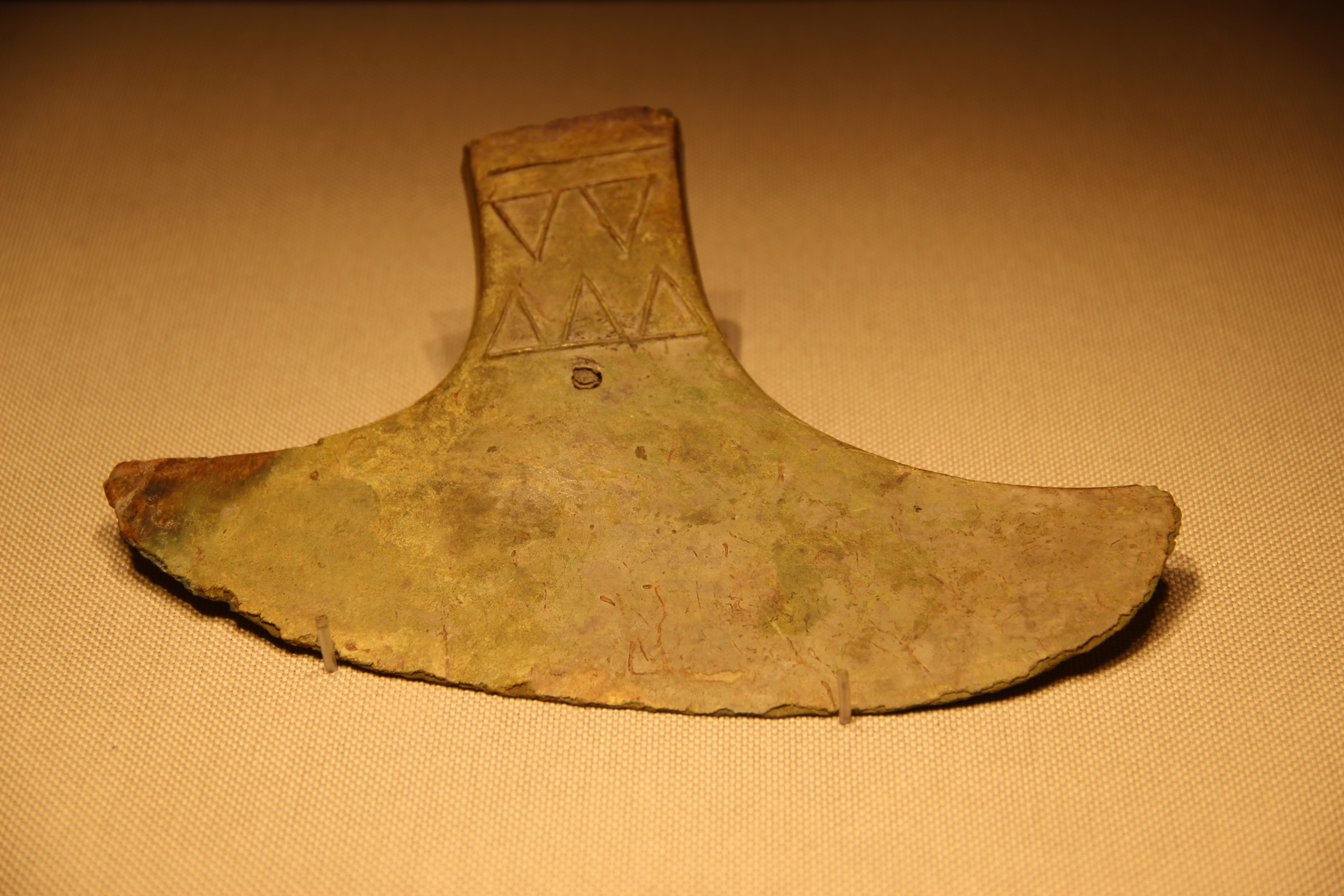
Wu Yue state, bronze axe

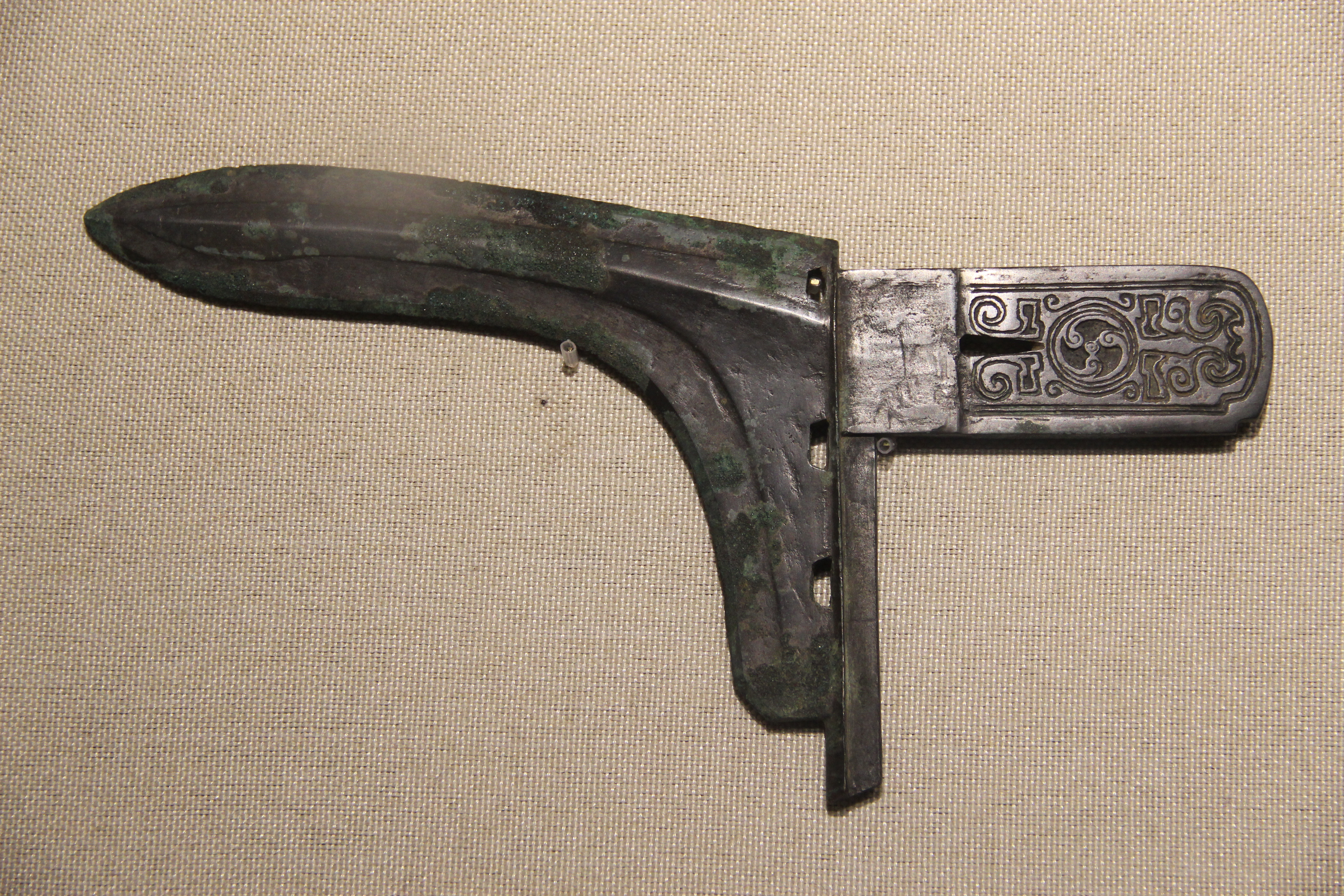
Wu Yue State, bronze Ge (Dagger-axe)

Ironically, Wu was later threatened by an upstart state to its own south, Yue; Chu then aided Yue's rise as a counter to Wu. Although Wu won a majority of battles against the Yue and captured their king, Goujian, Wu failed to completely subjugate Yue, in part because of King Fuchai of Wu's willingness to let King Goujian live in Wu as his servant. King Goujian suffered for years as Fuchai's servant/slave and planned his revenge. Fuchai under the promise of peace, let Goujian return to Yue, his homeland which later proved to be a fatal mistake for Wu. While Wu was engaged in a military campaign in the north, Goujian enacted his revenge and launched a surprise attack on Wu in 482 BC and conquered the capital. Over the next decade, Wu was unable to recover and Yue absorbed the state in 473 BC.

Wu, Yue, and Chu all proclaimed themselves kings in the 6th century BC, showing the drastic weakening of the Zhou court's authority during the Spring and Autumn period.

Wu and Yue were masters of metallurgy, fabricating excellent swords with incised messages, geometric patterns, and inlaid gold or silver. Wu and Yue swords tend to use much more tin than copper compared to those of other states. Wu often sent swords as gifts to northern states, such as Qi and Cai. Examples include the spearhead of King Fuchai and the sword of Prince Guang.

== Kings of Wu family tree ==
Chinese historical texts linked the kings of Wu to Taibo, the uncle of King Wen of Zhou. Their ancestral name was Ji and their clan name was Gufa. The last king of Wu, King Fuchai had at least four sons, three of whom were named You, Hong and Hui. You was his heir but was killed in one of the battles leading to the defeat of Wu, and Hong became the new heir. After the collapse of the state, the other three sons of Fuchai were exiled. Themselves, their blood relatives and descendants took Wu as their clan name in honor of their fallen kingdom.

State of Wu

Tai; King of Zhou 周太王
^{(1)}Taibo 太伯	^{(2)} Zhongyong 仲雍	Jili; King of Zhou 季歷
^{(3)}Jijian 季簡	Chang 昌 Wen of Zhou 周文王; 1099–1152BC –1056-1050
^{(4)}Shuda 叔達	Wu of Zhou ?–1046–1043BC
^{(5)}Zhouzhang 周章	Yuzhong 虞仲; State of Yu 虞國	Zhou dynasty
^{(6)}Xiongsui 熊遂
^{(7)}Kexiang 柯相
^{(8)}Qiangjiuyi 彊鳩夷
^{(9)}Yuqiaoyiwu 餘橋疑吾
^{(10)}Kelu 柯盧
^{(11)} Zhouyao 周繇
^{(12)} Quyu 屈羽
^{(13)} Yiwu 夷吾
^{(14)} Qinchu 禽處
^{(15)} Zhuan 轉
^{(16)}Pogao 頗高
^{(17)} Goubei 句卑
^{(18)} Quqi 去齊
^{(19)} Shoumeng 壽夢 ?–586–561 BC
^{(23)}Liao 僚 ?–527–515 BC	Jueyou 蹶由	^{(20)} Zhufan 諸樊 ?–561–548 BC	^{(21)} Yuji 余祭 ?–548–531 BC	^{(22)} Yumei 餘昧 ?–531–527 BC	Yanyu 掩余	Zhuyong 燭庸	Jizha 季札
Crown Prince; Zhufan 太子諸樊	Qingji 慶忌	Tong 通	^{(23)} Helü 闔閭 ?–515–496 BC	Fugai 夫概 ?–505 BC-?	Cheng 逞
Zhonglei 終累	^{(24)} Fuchai 夫差 ?–496–473 BC	Zishan 子山
Crown Prince You 太子友	Prince Gucao 王子姑曹	Prince Di 王子地

== Culture ==
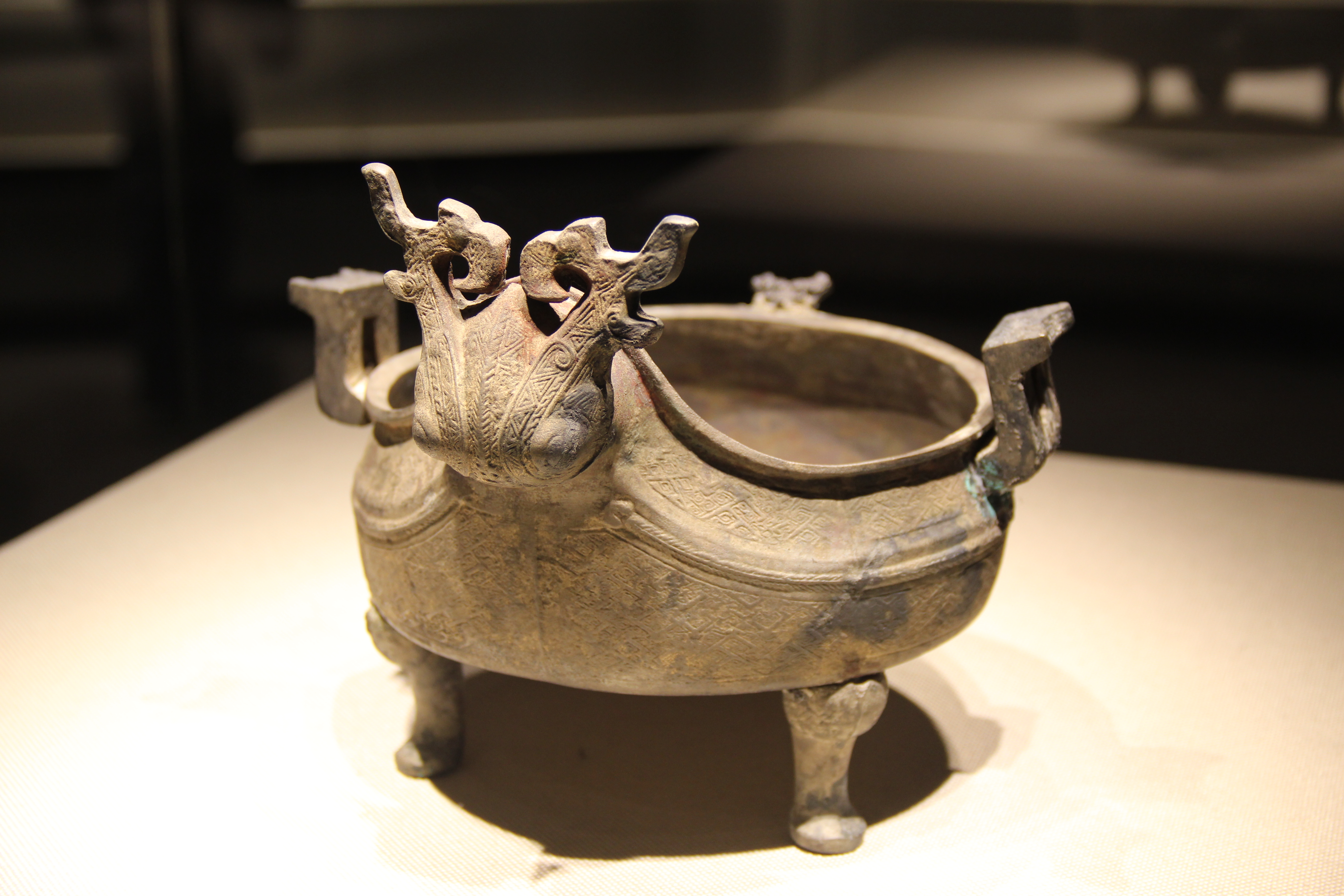
Wu Yue State, Yi vessel

The Records of the Grand Historian states that the people in Wu wore their hair short and sported tattoos. For Sima Qian this would have illustrated their supposed barbarism, as in his time Chinese men and women were not allowed to cut their hair or otherwise modify their body - doing so was considered an offence against the ancestors from which one had inherited one's physical features.

Wu rulers did not receive posthumous names after death.

=== Literature ===
The famed military strategist Sun Tzu, renowned for his military treatise The Art of War, served as a general under King Helü of Wu.

=== Languages ===
The rulers of Wu are said to be descendants of the early Zhou; however, the indigenous language of the Wu region is distinct from the Old Chinese spoken by the central Chinese states. Historians have attempted to link the language with Austronesian languages, Kra–Dai or a non-Chinese Sino-Tibetan language. A substrate of Kra–Dai languages has been detected in Wu dialects.

== Legacy ==
"Wu" continues to be used as a name for the region around Suzhou and Shanghai and their regional speech, Wu Chinese. It was employed by other states and princes holding power in the region, most notably Eastern Wu of the Three Kingdoms, and Wu and Wuyue of the Ten Kingdoms.

=== Connections with Japan ===
Ambassadorial visits to Japan by the later Chinese dynasties Wei and Jin recorded that the Wajin of Japan claimed to be descendants of Taibo of Wu, traditionally believed to be the mythical founder of Wu. Several scholars suggest that the Yamato people and the Imperial House of Japan are descendants of the Wu and possibly Taibo. Many Japanese historians also link the early Japanese Yayoi people to the Baiyue tribes.

=== Wu in astronomy ===
Wu, together with Yue, is represented with the star Zeta Aquilae in asterism Left Wall, Heavenly Market enclosure (see Chinese constellations).

== See also ==
- King of Wu
- Wu Zixu
- Yue
