= Synderesis =

Use of reason to intuitively discern truth

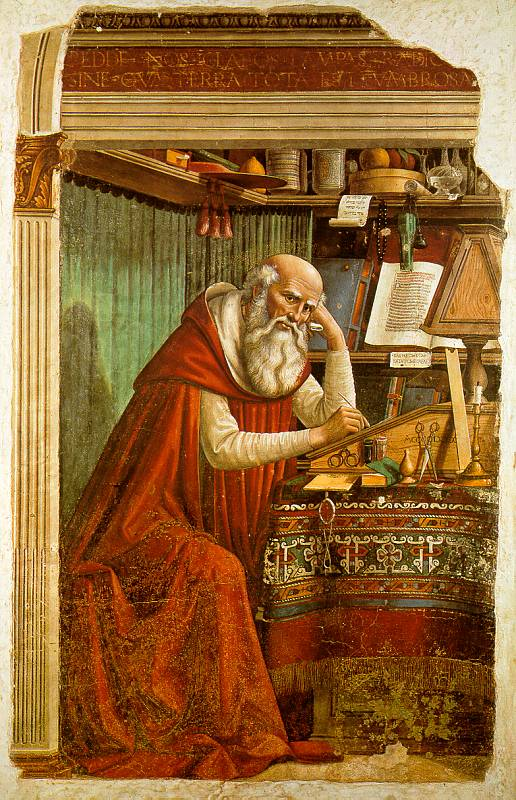
St. Jerome in His Study (1480), by Domenico Ghirlandaio. Jerome (A.D. 347–419) used the term syntéresin (συντήρησιν) in his Commentary on Ezekiel to describe the spark of conscience, an early formulation of synderesis.

In scholastic moral philosophy, synderesis (/ˌsɪndəˈriːsɪs/) or synteresis is habitual knowledge of the universal practical principles of moral action. The reasoning process in the field of speculative science presupposes certain fundamental axioms on which all science rests. Such are the principle of contradiction, "a thing cannot be and not be at the same time," and self-evident truths like "the whole is greater than its part". These are the first principles of the speculative intellect. In the field of moral conduct there are similar first principles of action, such as: "evil must be avoided, good done"; "Do not do to others what you would not wish to be done to yourself"; "Parents should be honoured"; "We should live temperately and act justly". Such as these are self-evident truths in the field of moral conduct which any sane person will admit if he understands them. According to the Scholastics, the readiness with which such moral truths are apprehended by the practical intellect is due to the natural habit impressed on the cognitive faculty which they call synderesis. While conscience is a dictate of the practical reason deciding that any particular action is right or wrong, synderesis is a dictate of the same practical reason which has for its object the first general principles of moral action.

== History ==
The notion of synderesis has a long tradition, including the Commentary on Ezekiel by Jerome (A.D. 347–419), where syntéresin (συντήρησιν) is mentioned among the powers of the soul and is described as the spark of conscience (scintilla conscientiae), and the interpretation of Jerome's text given, in the 13th century, by Albert the Great and Thomas Aquinas in the light of Aristotelian psychology and ethics. An alternative interpretation of synderesis was proposed by Bonaventure, who considered it as the natural inclination of the will towards moral good.

The word synderesis is by most scholars reckoned to be a corruption of the Greek word for shared knowledge or conscience, syneidêsis (συνείδησις), the corruption appearing in the medieval manuscripts of Jerome's Commentary.

The term is also used in psychiatric studies, with particular reference to psychopathy.
