= Tai Si =

Wife of King Wen of Zhou

Tai Si 太姒
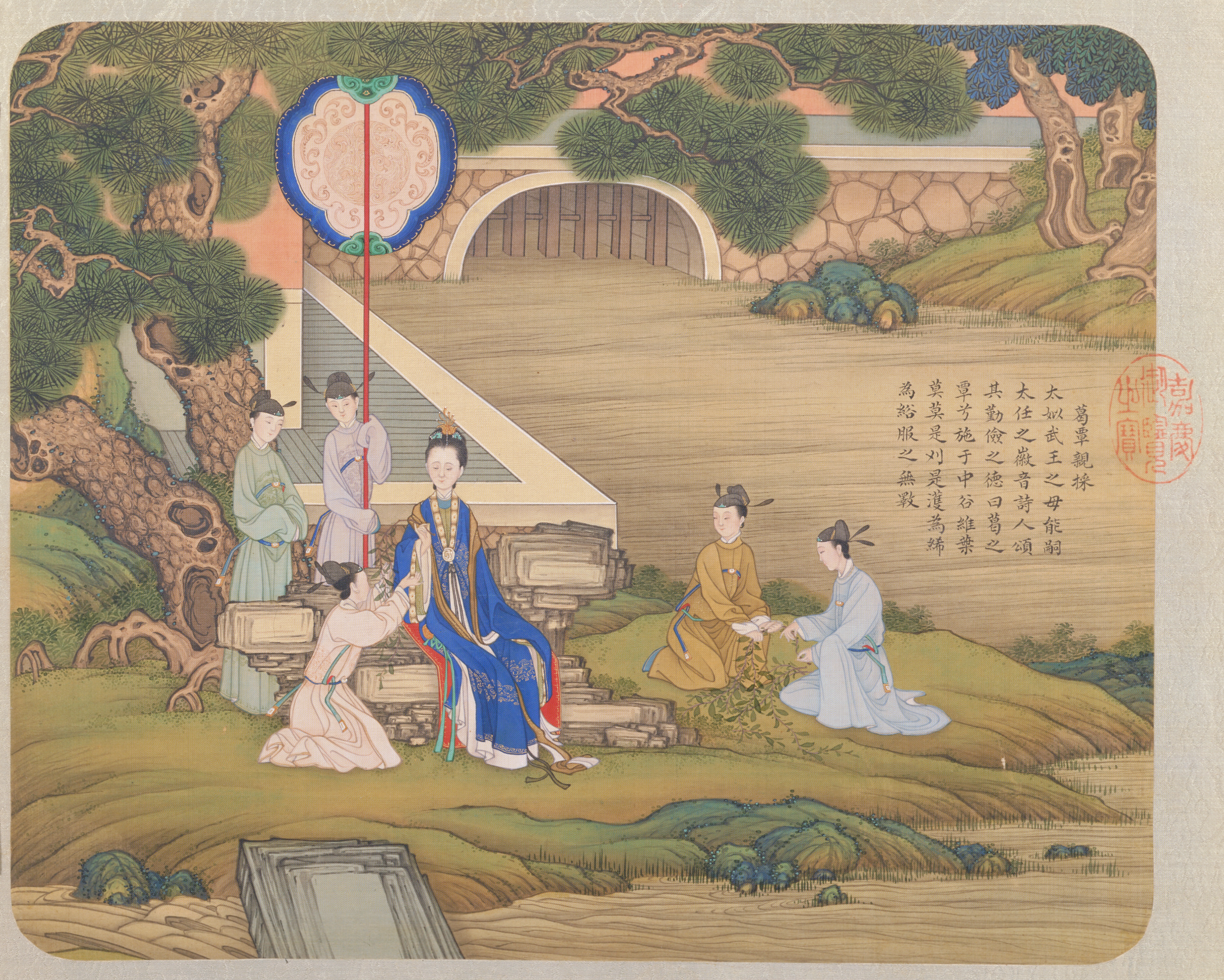
- Tai Si depicted by Qing dynasty painter Jiao Bingzhen

Queen of the Predynastic Zhou
- Predecessor: Tai Ren
- Successor: Yi Jiang
- Spouse: King Wen of Zhou
- Issue: Boyi Kao; Fa, King Wu of Zhou; Shu Xian of Guan; Dan, Duke of Zhou; Shu Du of Cai; Cao Shu Zhen Duo; Cheng Shu Wu; Shu Chu of Huo; Kang Shu Feng; Ran Ji Zai, Ruler of Dan

Tai Si
- Chinese: 太姒
Transcriptions
Standard Mandarin
- Hanyu Pinyin: Tài Sì
- Wade–Giles: T'ai^{4} Ssu^{4}
- IPA: [tʰâɪ sî]
Old Chinese
- Baxter–Sagart (2014): thāts lhǝ́

Tai Si (Chinese: 太姒, c. 12th – 11th century BC) was the wife of King Wen of Zhou and is revered as a highly respected woman of ancient China. She was a descendant of Yu the Great – founder of the Xia dynasty – and was the mother of ten sons, including King Wu of Zhou – founder of the Zhou dynasty – and his younger brother the Duke of Zhou.

Particularly respected by Wu Zetian, China's only Empress regnant, Tai Si and King Wen were posthumously given the temple names "Shizu" (Chinese: 始祖; lit. 'founding ancestor') in 690 AD.

== Life ==
Tai Si is said to be born in the Youxin clan (Chinese: 有莘氏) of the ancestral name Si, from what is now Heyang County, Shaanxi Province. Han dynasty historian Sima Qian wrote that she was originally from the older State of Qi or State of Zeng, both in and around modern-day Henan Province.

The traditional story regarding Tai Si's rise to queen says that the future King Wen of Zhou, born Chang, was walking along the banks of the Wei River one day when he first met Tai Si. Her beauty so captivated Chang that he initially thought she was a goddess or angel. Tai Si proved a woman of benevolence, wisdom, and simple tastes, and Chang decided to take her as his wife. Because the Wei River was not bridged, Chang set out to build one by constructing a number of boats that were arranged end-to-end to form a floating path across the river. Tai Si was impressed, and they were married.

After her marriage, Tai Si quickly gained the favor of other women in the royal family, receiving praise for her work ethic and demeanor. She also was recognized for exceptional parenting and teaching of her sons, with all ten being described as virtuous and wise.

== In literature ==
Guan ju, the famous opening song of the Book of Songs, with its opening description of a beautiful maiden plucking plants along a river bank who is loved by a young prince, is said by some to be originally about Tai Si and the prince's first meeting along the Wei River.
