= Predynastic Zhou =

11th century BC precursor to the Zhou dynasty

Predynastic Zhou 先周
- c. 1150 BC–1046 BC
- Status: Autonomous state within Shang dynasty
- Capital: Bin; Zhouyuan (周原)
- Common languages: Old Chinese
- Religion: Chinese patriarchal religion, Mandate of Heaven
- Government: Chiefdom
- Leader
  - c. 1158 – 1126 BC: Ji Danfu
  - c. 1126 – 1101 BC: Ji Li
  - c. 1101 – 1050 BC: Ji Chang
  - c. 1050 – 1046 BC: Ji Fa
- Historical era: Bronze Age
  - Capital moved to Zhouyuan: c. 1150 BC
  - Murder of Ji Li: 1101 BC
  - Ji Chang received Mandate of Heaven: 1059 BC
  - Battle of Muye: 1046 BC
  - Established dynasty: 1046 BC
Succeeded by
Zhou dynasty
- Today part of: China

The Predynastic Zhou or Proto-Zhou (/dʒoʊ/; Chinese: 先周; pinyin: xiān zhōu) refers to the ancient Chinese state ruled by the Ji clan that existed in the Guanzhong region (modern central Shaanxi province) during the Shang dynasty, before its rebellion and subsequent conquest of the Shang in 1046-1045 BC led to the establishment of the Zhou dynasty. According to histories, predynastic Zhou rose as a western frontier vassal state of the Shang, acting as its ally against the Xirong barbarians until their influence surpassed that of the Shang dynasty.

Records about predynastic Zhou came from two sources. The Shang dynasty kept records about Zhou in oracle bones. The texts about Zhou inscribed by the Shang court are mainly those from the reign of Wu Ding and the last Shang monarchs. After the fall of Shang, the Ji clan established the Zhou dynasty and started their own narrative about previous generations. The Book of Documents and the Bamboo Annals are two major historical sources. Later, Sima Qian wrote about the country using those texts as reference.

== Attempts in determining time frames ==
The extant known sources about Zhou and the Ji clan only allow for precise dating beginning in 841 BC, the beginning of the Gonghe Regency. Predynastic Zhou, having existed about three centuries earlier, is difficult to precisely date. This Shang vassal state's existence seems to have spanned across four generations, from Gugong Danfu to Ji Fa (King Wu of Zhou, the first king of the Zhou dynasty). However, the records detailing the former's rule are very sparse, so modern historiography has generally been more concerned about precisely dating the ending of the predynastic era. Zhou official texts record various astronomical events, whose timing can be calculated using modern astronomical techniques; this allows historians and archaeologists to attempt to precisely date events through reference to the timing of these astronomical events.

The Xia-Shang-Zhou Chronology Project, an ambitious collaboration of Chinese historians commissioned by the People's Republic of China in 2000, produced a draft report that identifies Gugong Danfu's first year of rule as 1158 BC, around the reign of Shang king Geng Ding. His son Jili's rule was calculated to be 1126 BC - 1101 BC, which indicates that he died at the same time as the Shang king Wen Wu Ding.

Ji Fa's ascension to power is of historical interest, since his life revolved around heavenly signs that have been proved to be true. The common accepted year in which Ji Fa succeeded as leader of Predynastic Zhou is 1050 BC, the year proposed by the XSZ Chronology Project. However, the American sinologist David Nivison studied the information given by the Bamboo Annals, and suggested the Shang dynasty's beginning year to be 1558 BC. Because the Bamboo Annals says that King Wu's assumption of power began 496 years after its predecessor, he is thought to have done so in 1062 BC. He moved the 1059 BC planetary conjunction back to 1071 BC, arriving at his result for the dating of events. The Battle of Muye was said to be in Wu's 12th year in the Annals, a year different from other historical texts. Nivison's research dated this battle to 1051 BC and stated that Predynastic Zhou also reached its end that year.

== History ==
=== Records by the Shang court ===
Information about Zhou that was written by the Shang dynasty is scarce, as the polity was quite far from Shang's core lands. The earliest references date to the reign of Wu Ding, from approximately 1250 BC to 1192 BC. His court carved a large portion of the extant oracle bone inscriptions mentioning Zhou; however, they only provide the king's perspective towards the country. Wu Ding referred to the Ji clan and its subordinates as "Zhoufang" (周方), a common naming traditions that the Shang used to address neighboring polities. Zhou at that time was vassalized, but was not fully brought under Wu Ding's suzerainty. Its distance from the Shang was significant, and it was also separated from Yin, the Shang capital, by numerous aggressive tribes and clans. Therefore, oracle texts from Wu Ding's regnal era do not contain sufficient information to fully understand the Zhou of his era.

Wu Ding wrote about his concerns for his remote vassal. His writings on the topic are divinatory texts asking for guidance concerning the Zhou soldiers' welfare and inquiries on Zhou hunts. On the other hand, Wu Ding never visited Zhou territory to tour or hunt. He also did not order Zhou manpower to aid Shang's public construction works and wars. Furthermore, despite his concerns about the Zhou people's prosperity, he made no questions or divinations about whether their harvests were successful or not. His focus was primarily on tribes and chiefdoms closer to his territory, especially the Guifang and Tufang, some of whom lived between the Shang core regions and the Ji clan's territory.

When Wu Ding died (c. 1200 BC), Shang's contact with Zhou declined; the Ji clan, still a vassal, only re-established significant contact during the reign of Wu's great grandson, Wu Yi (武乙, reigned 1147 - 1112 BC). During this period, Predynastic Zhou was under the control of Ji Li (季歷). Oracle bones at this time mention very little about Ji Li and his descendants' relations with Shang. Zhou was active as an ally of Shang during this time. Ji Chang, the penultimate lord of predynastic Zhou in the traditional records, was called "bo" (elder) of Zhou by Shang scribes. He was addressed as a nondistinct "Zhōufāng Bó" (周方白) on oracle bones from the Shang's final years. Ji Chang passed his power to one of his male children, Ji Fa. Around 1046 BC, the Shang king Di Xin was making war on the eastern polities. Ji Fa seized this opportunity and attacked. The remaining Shang forces suffered a fatal defeat at Muye; Di Xin died around the same time. With this victory, Zhou established its supremacy over the Shang states and entered the Dynastic period.

=== Records by Zhou dynasty and later historians ===
Unlike their predecessor Shang, the kings of Zhou kept detailed records about their pre-royal era. Historical records are in the Shangshu and the Bamboo Annals. The texts contain various chapters concerning the reigns Shang kings from Wu Ding, corresponding with the time of Yayu, Gongshu Zulei, Ji Danfu, Ji Li, Ji Chang and Ji Fa. Han period historian Sima Qian (145 - 86 BC) used the books to construct his work, the Records of the Grand Historian.

The Zhou ancestors were allegedly descendants of the Yellow Emperor through Emperor Ku. Legends say that Ku's wife Jiang Yuan stepped in a magic footprint and conceived. She gave birth to Hou Ji, who is considered the first Zhou ancestor. The narrative implies familial relation between Zhou and Shang, as Shang's legendary ancestor Xie was the brother of Hou Ji.

According to Sima Qian, predynastic Zhou was established by Ji Danfu when he relocated his clan from their home of Bin to a new settlement near the Mount of Qi called Zhouyuan (周原) along the Wei River. His two elder sons Taibo and Zhongyong were said to have abandoned the territory and fled south to establish Wu on the lower Yangtze. His youngest son Ji Li then inherited Zhou and expanded it with numerous campaigns against the Yitu (翳徒) Rong "barbarians" around Shang. His power threatened King Wen Ding. In 1101 BC, when Ji Li came for a victory tribute, King Wen Ding locked him up in a camp's storage and left him to starve to death. The leader's son, Ji Chang, was chosen to be the next Zhou elder.

==== Ji Chang's plans to overthrow Shang ====
In the first half of the 11th century BC, Ji Chang was enfranchised by Di Xin and given the title "Overlord of the West". Di Xin was otherwise aware of Zhou's rising power, and acted against them. Chang was imprisoned by Di Xin at Youli before being ransomed by other nobles. In some accounts, Ji Chang was forced to consume his eldest son as meat cakes or a soup at the king's order. After several years, some of Di Xin's officials became impressed by Ji Chang's righteousness and bribed the king for his mercy. Ji Chang was eventually released and allowed to retake control of Zhou. He immediately strengthened the state, aiming to end the impious regime of Di Xin. He then met with Jiang Ziya, an old person who regularly fished in the Pan River. Learning about Jiang's intellectual capability, the Overlord of the West hired him and made him his most trusted assistant. To strengthen their connections, Chang arranged several marriages of his relatives to the Jiang clan. His second son, Ji Fa, was paired with Jiang Ziya's daughter Yi Jiang and fathered a son, Ji Song.

To solidify Zhou's power before countering Di Xin's army, Ji Chang launched numerous expansion campaigns. His target included the Shang dynasty's long-term enemies that had already been weakened by Wu Ding almost 200 years earlier. After expelling the Quanrong barbarians, he turned to the closest vassals and regional provinces of Shang. He attacked Chong, home of Hu, Marquis of Chong, his arch-enemy, and defeated it, gaining access to the Ford of Meng through which his army could cross to attack Shang. As a result of his ability to maintain formidable power, he eventually gained control of the majority of Shang lands. Nevertheless, Ji Chang also died at that time (around 1050 BC), and his plans to directly attack Di Xin were postponed. Ji Fa succeeded his father, and was ennobled as the 2nd Overlord of the West.

Ji Fa then avenged his grandfather and brother at the Battle of Muye with the strong army that his father had assembled. Almost all of the regional lords that had been subdued by Ji Chang allied with Ji Fa and crushed the armies of Shang. Di Xin was thought to have been killed by Ji Fa in order to end his "wickedness". Di Xin's relatives, such as Weizi and Wu Geng, were spared and became subordinates of the Zhou dynasty.

== Justifying Zhou's overthrow of Shang ==
Predynastic Zhou's actions under the rule of Ji Chang and Ji Fa were justified by later Zhou kings through the concept of the Mandate of Heaven. This concept was a philosophical theory concerning what determines a monarch's right to rule. According to the Mandate, a ruler was appointed by Heaven, and Heaven's will would be transmitted to his family. Complying with Predynastic Zhou's patrilineal succession traditions, the one chosen by Heaven had to be the eldest male child of the current ruler. The right to rule of a person depended on his virtue; if the one chosen was cruel and incapable, Heaven had the authority to depose him and replace him with a new one. The replacement would be pre-announced through natural disasters and astronomical events. According to Zhou's narrative, the final Shang king Di Xin was decadent, and therefore no longer authorized to receive the Mandate of Heaven. Ji Chang, posthumously known as King Wen of Zhou, was appointed the new ruler by Heaven. In the traditional narrative, King Wen's interpretation of astronomical events anticipated the Mandate of Heaven, which would become increasingly complex.

In 1059 BC, two unusual celestial phenomena took place. In May, the densest clustering in five hundred years' time of the five planets visible to the naked eye could be seen in the constellation of Cancer, followed a few seasons later by an apparition of Comet Halley. Ji Chang witnessed the heavenly signs and thought of them as Heaven choosing him to be the new ruler. Early records, such as the inscription on the Da Yu ding, describe Heaven's Mandate in terms of an actual astronomic event: "the great command in the sky" (天有大令). (Note: 令; líng here is to be read as 命; mìng, which had not yet developed at this early stage of the written language.)

King Wen is not mentioned as receiving the Mandate in official traditional records; however, ancient texts all agree that he was given divine approval to be the next king. The subsequent generations of the Zhou dynasty developed the concept into a system that would dictate the course of the Chinese monarchy for approximately 3000 years. From the Zhou dynasty onward, almost every Chinese ruler used the Mandate of Heaven as a means of legitimizing their heavenly right to be the master of tianxia - all under Heaven.

== Rulers ==
- Important ancestor: Gong Liu, who led the migration of the clan to Bin
- 1st ruler: Gugong Danfu, also known as King Tai of Zhou
- 2nd ruler: Jili, also known as King Ji of Zhou
- 3rd ruler: Ji Chang, also known as King Wen of Zhou
- Final ruler: Ji Fa, also known as King Wu of Zhou, who conquered Shang and established the Zhou dynasty

The genealogy of Predynastic Zhou leaders as given in traditional accounts:

Gongshu Zulei (1192 - 1158 BC)
Gugong Danfu (1158–1126 BC)
Jili, Elder of Zhou
Tai Jiang of Pang
King Wen of Zhou (1125 BC - 1050 BC)
Queen Tai Ren (Shang dynasty princess)
King Wu of Zhou (died 1043 BC)
Queen Tai Si

== See also ==
- Kings of Zhou
- Ancestry of the Zhou dynasty
- Predynastic Shang
- List of Shang dynasty states
- List of Chinese monarchs
