= Zhongyong of Wu =

Second leader of the ancient Chinese State of Wu

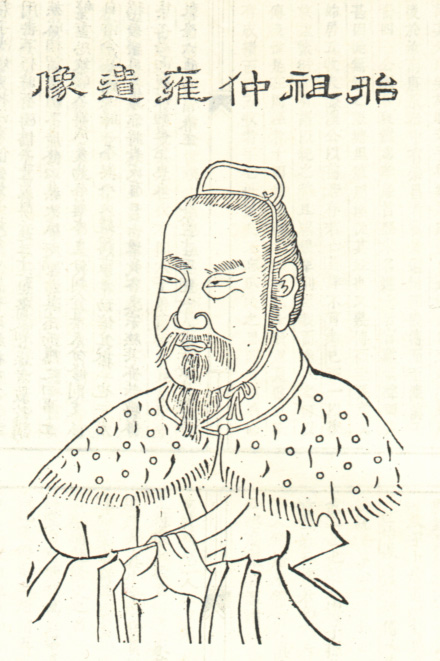
Qing dynasty portrayal of Zhongyong

Zhongyong (Chinese: 仲雍) was the second ruler of the ancient Chinese State of Wu according to traditional Chinese history.

His ancestral name was Ji (姬), given name was Yong, and Zhong refers to his rank as the second son of King Tai of Zhou. According to traditional Chinese history, the youngest son of King Tai Jili was so renowned for his wisdom that Zhongyong and his elder brother Taibo voluntarily renounced their claims to the throne of Zhou and left instead to found the state of Wu near the mouth of the Yangtze.

They settled at Meili and improved the agriculture and irrigation systems of the local tribes. Taibo became the first king of Wu, but he left no children and was succeeded by his brother Zhongyong. The future kings of Wu were his descendants.
