= Qishan County =

Coordinates: 34°24′41″N 107°41′59″E

Qishan County 岐山县
- County
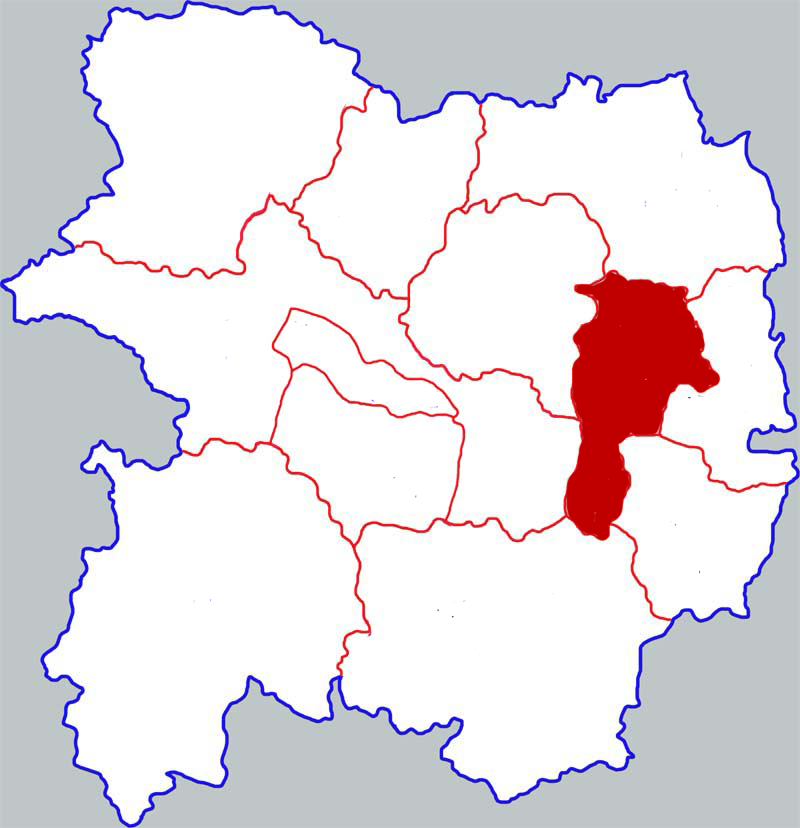
- Qishan in Baoji

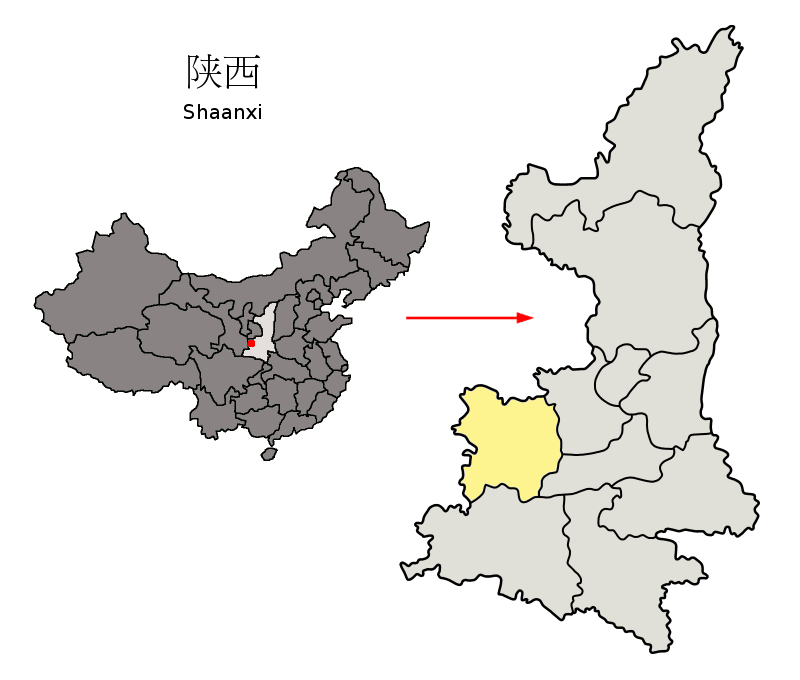
- Baoji in Shaanxi
- Country: People's Republic of China
- Province: Shaanxi
- Prefecture-level city: Baoji

Area
  - Total: 856.45 km^{2} (330.68 sq mi)

Population (2019)
  - Total: 464,800
  - Density: 542.7/km^{2} (1,406/sq mi)
- Time zone: UTC+8 (China standard time)
- Postal code: 722400

Qishan County
- Chinese: 岐山
- Postal: Kishan
- Literal meaning: Mount Qi
Transcriptions
Standard Mandarin
- Hanyu Pinyin: Qíshān
- Wade–Giles: Ch'i-shan

Zhouyuan
- Chinese: 周原
- Literal meaning: Plain(s) of the Zhou
Transcriptions
Standard Mandarin
- Hanyu Pinyin: Zhōuyuán
- Wade–Giles: Chou-yüen

Qiyi
- Chinese: 岐邑
- Literal meaning: Qi City
Transcriptions
Standard Mandarin
- Hanyu Pinyin: Qíyì
- Wade–Giles: Ch'i-i

Qishan County is a county in western Guanzhong, Shaanxi Province, China, under the administration of the prefecture-level city of Baoji.

== History ==
Fengchu Township on the Wei River near Mount Qi in Qishan County was the site of the capital of the ancient state of Zhou under the Shang dynasty, which served as the capital of the predynastic Zhou until Ji Chang moved his court east to Fengjing c. 1051 BC. This capital was variously known as Qishan ("Mount Qi"), Qiyi ("Qi City"), and Zhouyuan ("Zhou Plains"). Many Zhou-era artifacts have been found here. These are now housed in a museum on the site.

== Administrative divisions ==
As of 2020, Qishan County is divided to 9 towns.

Towns

- Fengming (凤鸣镇)
- Caijiapo (蔡家坡镇)
- Yidian (益店镇)
- Pucun (蒲村镇)
- Qinghua (青化镇)
- Zaolin (枣林镇)
- Yongchuan (雍川镇)
- Gujun (故郡镇)
- Jingdang (京当镇)

== Climate ==
Climate data for Qishan, elevation 670 m (2,200 ft), (1991–2020 normals, extremes 1981–present)
Month	Jan	Feb	Mar	Apr	May	Jun	Jul	Aug	Sep	Oct	Nov	Dec	Year
Record high °C (°F)	22.2 (72.0)	23.8 (74.8)	27.5 (81.5)	35.1 (95.2)	36.8 (98.2)	41.3 (106.3)	41.5 (106.7)	38.4 (101.1)	37.9 (100.2)	31.8 (89.2)	25.1 (77.2)	22.1 (71.8)	41.5 (106.7)
Mean daily maximum °C (°F)	4.9 (40.8)	8.6 (47.5)	14.3 (57.7)	20.6 (69.1)	25.2 (77.4)	30.3 (86.5)	31.3 (88.3)	28.8 (83.8)	23.8 (74.8)	18.3 (64.9)	12.1 (53.8)	6.4 (43.5)	18.7 (65.7)
Daily mean °C (°F)	−1.1 (30.0)	2.4 (36.3)	7.8 (46.0)	13.7 (56.7)	18.4 (65.1)	23.6 (74.5)	25.6 (78.1)	23.6 (74.5)	18.6 (65.5)	12.7 (54.9)	6.0 (42.8)	0.3 (32.5)	12.6 (54.7)
Mean daily minimum °C (°F)	−5.5 (22.1)	−2.2 (28.0)	2.6 (36.7)	7.7 (45.9)	12.3 (54.1)	17.3 (63.1)	20.6 (69.1)	19.5 (67.1)	14.7 (58.5)	8.6 (47.5)	1.5 (34.7)	−4.1 (24.6)	7.8 (46.0)
Record low °C (°F)	−14.9 (5.2)	−14.6 (5.7)	−8.5 (16.7)	−2.1 (28.2)	1.1 (34.0)	7.7 (45.9)	10.7 (51.3)	10.8 (51.4)	4.0 (39.2)	−4.2 (24.4)	−11.3 (11.7)	−20.3 (−4.5)	−20.3 (−4.5)
Average precipitation mm (inches)	6.5 (0.26)	8.9 (0.35)	22.1 (0.87)	37.1 (1.46)	57.8 (2.28)	70.0 (2.76)	90.6 (3.57)	115.4 (4.54)	107.5 (4.23)	54.0 (2.13)	19.1 (0.75)	4.0 (0.16)	593 (23.36)
Average precipitation days (≥ 0.1 mm)	4.2	4.6	6.9	7.1	10.0	9.4	10.0	11.2	12.5	10.6	6.0	3.2	95.7
Average snowy days	5.8	4.7	2.0	0.1	0	0	0	0	0	0.1	1.8	3.7	18.2
Average relative humidity (%)	62	63	65	68	69	64	71	79	82	79	73	65	70
Mean monthly sunshine hours	153.0	140.3	172.9	199.4	217.0	210.3	211.4	187.1	142.4	142.9	153.7	159.8	2,090.2
Percentage possible sunshine	49	45	46	51	50	49	48	46	39	41	50	52	47
Source: China Meteorological Administration all-time extreme temperature
