= De (Chinese philosophy) =

Concept in Chinese philosophy

Chinese name
- Chinese: 德
Transcriptions
Standard Mandarin
- Hanyu Pinyin: dé
Yue: Cantonese
- Jyutping: dak1

Vietnamese name
- Vietnamese: đức
- Chữ Hán: 德

Korean name
- Hangul: 덕
- Hanja: 德
Transcriptions
- Revised Romanization: deok

Japanese name
- Kanji: 德
- Kana: とく
Transcriptions
- Romanization: toku

De (/də/; Chinese: 德; pinyin: dé), also written as Te, is a key concept in Chinese philosophy, usually translated "inherent character; inner power; integrity" in Taoism, "moral character; virtue; morality" in Confucianism and other contexts, and "quality; virtue" (guṇa) or "merit; virtuous deeds" (puṇya) in Chinese Buddhism.

== The word ==
Chinese de 德 is an ancient word with complexities across several subfields of linguistics: namely in its semantics, orthography, and etymology.

=== Meanings ===
The Hanyu Da Zidian, provides twenty meanings for de 德, translatable as

1. Rise, go up, climb, ascend. [升; 登.]
2. Morals, morality, virtue, personal conduct, moral integrity, honor. [道德, 品行, 节操.]
3. Denoting a wise/enlightened person with moral character. [指有道德的贤明之人.]
4. Kindness, favor, grace, graciousness. [恩惠, 恩德.]
5. Grateful, gratefulness, thankful, indebted. [感恩, 感激.]
6. Benevolent rule, good government, good instruction. [德政, 善教.]
7. Objective regulations/rules. [客观规律.]
8. Quality, nature, basic character, characteristics, attribute. [性质; 属性.]
9. Intention, purpose, heart, mind. For example: "Be of one heart and mind". [心意. 如:一心一德.]
10. In Five Phases theory, a reference to seasonally productive energy/air. [五行说指四季的旺气.]
11. First growth, initial stage, beginning of something. [始生; 事物的开始.]
12. A phoenix-head pattern/decoration. [凤凰头上的花纹.]
13. Blessings, good fortune, happiness, resulting from benevolent actions. [福, 善庆的事.]
14. Used for zhí "straight, just". [通 "直(zhí)".]
15. Used for zhí "to plant, grow, establish". Plant a tree. [通 "植(zhí)". 立木.]
16. Used for "get, obtain, result in". [通 "得".]
17. A national name. An abbreviation for the Federal Republic of Germany. [国名. 德意志联邦共和国的简称.]
18. A star name. [星名.]
19. A river name. Another name for the Yellow River. [水名. 黄河之别名.]
20. A surname. [姓.]

This dictionary provides early usage examples, and all of these de meanings occur in Han or pre-Han Chinese classic texts, except for number 17 (de abbreviating Deutschland).

Translating de into English is problematic and controversial. Arthur Waley believed that de was better translated "power" than "virtue", and explained with a "bank of fortune" metaphor.

It is usually translated 'virtue', and this often seems to work quite well; though where the word occurs in early, pre-moralistic texts such a translation is in reality quite false. But if we study the usage of the word carefully we find that de can be bad as well as good. What is a 'bad virtue'? Clearly 'virtue' is not a satisfactory equivalent. Indeed on examining the history of the word we find that it means something much more like the Indian karma, save that the fruits of te are generally manifested here and now; whereas karma is bound up with a theory of transmigration, and its effects are usually not seen in this life, but in a subsequent incarnation. Te is anything that happens to one or that one does of a kind indicating that, as a consequence, one is going to meet with good or bad luck. It means, so to speak, the stock of credit (or the deficit) that at any given moment a man has at the bank of fortune. Such a stock is of course built up partly by the correct carrying out of ritual; but primarily by securing favourable omens; for unless the omens are favourable, no rite can be carried out at all.

Based on the cognate relation between de and zhi "to plant", Waley further noted the early Chinese regarded planting seeds as a de, hence it "means a latent power, a 'virtue' inherent in something."

The linguist Peter A. Boodberg investigated the semantics and etymology of de 德, which he called "perhaps the most significant word, next to tao 道, in ancient Chinese macro- and microcosmology."

The standard translation for it is "virtue," both in the sense of inherent quality and in that of moral excellence, but with the validity of the traditional rendering somewhat shaken by Arthur Waley's insistence on interpreting it as "power." Indeed, it is believed by many scholars that the term originated in the mytho-magical period of Chinese speculation when tê was conceived as a kind of mana-like potency inherent in substances, things, and human beings, a potency which, on the one hand, made them true to their essence, and on the other, made possible their influencing of other entities. It appears often as if it had been imagined as a kind of electric charge permeating the thing in question, waxing or waning in accordance with some mysterious law, and capable of being transmitted, in the case of living beings, from one generation to another. Contrary-minded students of ancient Chinese philosophy dispute this interpretation as rather narrow and possibly anachronistic, and point to the fact that tê had early acquired, at least in Confucian literature, ethical connotations close to our "virtue," that is, as moral, and only rarely amoral or immoral, efficacy. They find, therefore, no quarrel with rendering tê, almost invariably, as "virtue." Philologists are, however, troubled by the absence in the Chinese term of any connotations reminiscent of the Latin etymon vir, such as manliness and virility. They remind us that tê is free from any contamination with sexual associations and differs in that from its great counterpart, tao, the Way, which, in one or two expressions, such as jên tao 人道, "the way of men and women," is suggestive of sexual activity. Other recommended translation, such as "energy" and "essential quality," seem also inadequate from the etymological point of view.

Victor Mair explains that the difficulty of accurately translating de,

...is evident from the astonishing sweep of thoughtful renderings of its meaning: power, action, life, inner potency, indarrectitude (inner uprightness), charisma, mana (impersonal supernatural force inherent in gods and sacred objects), sinderesis (conscience as the directive force of one's actions), and virtue, to name only a few of the brave attempts to convey the meaning of te in English. Of these, the last is by far the most frequently encountered. Unfortunately, it is also probably the least appropriate of all to serve as an accurate translation of te in the Tao Te Ching.

Mair (1990, p. 135) concludes that Daoist de is best translated "integrity", which "means no more than the wholeness or completeness of a given entity," and like de, "it represents the selfhood of every being in the universe."

Chinese Oracle script for de 德 "virtue"

Chinese Bronze script for de 德 "virtue"

Chinese Seal script for de 德 "virtue"

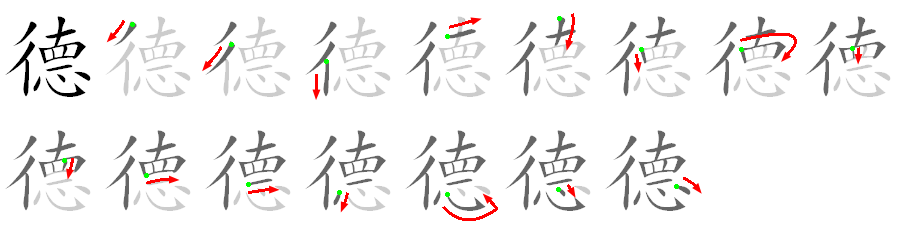
Stroke order of the character 德

=== Characters ===
De "power; virtue" is written with the Chinese character 德 in both Traditional Chinese and Simplified Chinese. This character 德 combines the chi 彳 "footstep; go" radical (recurring graphic elements that suggest meaning) with zhi 直 "straight; vertical" and xin 心 "heart; mind". De 德 has rare variant characters of 徳 (without the horizontal 一 line) and 悳 or 惪 (without the 彳 "footstep" radical).

The earliest written forms of de 德 are oracle script from the Shang dynasty (c. 1600–1046 BCE) and bronzeware script and seal script from the Zhou dynasty (1045–256 BCE). Oracle characters wrote de 德 with 彳 "footstep; go" and 直 "straight", later bronze characters added the 心 "heart; mind" element. The oracle script for zhi 直 "straight; vertical" ideographically depicted shu 丨 "vertical line (in a character)" above mu 目 "eye", the bronze script elaborated the line into shi 十 "ten", and the seal script separated the eye and heart with a horizontal line. Poetically this could read as a choice of "from the womb or to the tomb". As the eye is associated with worldly desires and wants as opposed to the heart, being the home of de and needs.

=== Etymologies ===
Boodberg undertook a "graphophonetic analysis" of de. Based on the phonetic element zhi 直 "upright; erect" and the radical 行 suggesting movement, he translates de as English arrect "set upright; direct upward" (from Latin ad- "to") or insititious "ingrafted; inserted" potency (from Latin insitio "to implant; to graft"). Interpreting the 心 "heart; mind" to connote "innerness", he takes the prefix from Latin indoles "innate quality; natural disposition" to further neologize indarrect. Boodberg concludes that the noun de is best translated enrective in the passive sense of power, or arrective in the active sense of influencing others. He says the Chinese understood de as potent but not coercive, and as arrective rather than corrective. Since early texts describe de 德 as an acquired quality, he proposes it is a paronym of de 得 "to acquire; to obtain", which is a common definition of de "power; virtue". Lastly, he notes a possible etymology of "see straight; looking straight at things; intuition" because early zhi 直 graphs depicted a straight line over an 目 "eye" (horizontally written 罒 in 德). Victor H. Mair proposes a correlation between Proto-Indo-European dugh and de.

Te was pronounced approximately dugh during the early Chou period (about 1100 to 600 B.C.). The meanings it conveys in texts from that era are "character," "[good or bad] intentions," "quality," "disposition," "personality," "personhood," "personal strength," and "worth." There is a very close correlation between these meanings and words deriving from Proto-Indo-European dugh (to be fit, of use, proper; acceptable; achieve). And there is a whole series of words derived from the related Teutonic verbal root dugan. There are Old High German tugan, Middle High German tugen, and modern German taugen [also see German "Tugend" (virtue)], all of which mean "to be good, fit, of use." There is another cognate group of words relating to modern English "doughty" (meaning worthy, valiant, stouthearted) that also contribute to our understanding of te. They are Middle English douhti, dohti, of dühti ("valiant").

In modern Dutch, the noun de can be translated as deugd; the verb deugen means "to have virtue".

According to Axel Schuessler, de < *tək 德 "moral force, virtue, character; quality, nature" is probably in the same word family as de < *tək 得 "to get" and perhaps zhi < *drək 直 "straight; right". It quotes the proposal of Edwin G. Pulleyblank that de 德 and de 得 are cognate with Tibetan language thub "a mighty one, one having power and authority".

== Taoist usages ==
=== Wuxing heqidao ===
Wuxing heqidao (五行合气道), Gogyo Aikido in Japanese, has its roots in Confucian, Taoist, and Buddhist theory. This Art centers on the development of de (德) as the basis of traditional intersectional and integrative health and wellness, encouraging the experience and expression of the practitioners' True Nature (prenatal jing, Pre-Heaven essence).

The unification of mind, body and environment is emphasised using the anatomy and physiological theory of wuxing, (five elements) traditional Chinese medicine. The core foundational movements, exercises, and teachings cultivate, direct, and harmonise the internal and external qi (energy) to build moral character (道德) to strengthen the connection with de (德). This in turn gives integrity to the trinity of Heaven, Earth, and Human, (shen, qi, jing) through the chong mai meridian (energy lines) and the zheng qi (upright energy).

The application of the four pillars are emphasized throughout including, wuxing meditation education, daoyin ("guiding and pulling" exercises), shiliao, (traditional food therapy), and the study of hands-on tui na (acupressure).

=== The Daodejing ===
De (德) is a keyword in the Daodejing where it occurs 44 times, compared to 76 occurrences of dao. The title refers to a textual division between the Daojing—chapters 1–37, since the first begins with dao: "The Way that can be told"—and the Dejing —chapters 38–81, since chapter 38 begins with de. The relatively modern compound word daode (道德) means "morality, ethical principles, ethics, moral philosophy". Two common de themes are its connection with the dao and its usefulness in managing people.

The first Daojing theme is the interrelationship between de and dao. "Such the scope of the All-pervading Power. That it alone can act through the Way." Chapter 38, the so-called "De Chapter", has the greatest number of occurrences. Note that de is translated as "power" in the following translations.

The man of highest "power" does not reveal himself as a possessor of "power";

Therefore he keeps his "power".
The man of inferior "power" cannot rid it of the appearance of "power";
Therefore he is in truth without "power".
The man of highest "power" neither acts nor is there any who so regards him; The man of inferior "power" both acts and is so regarded.
The man of highest humanity, though he acts, is not regarded;
Whereas a man of even the highest morality both acts and is so regarded;
While even he who is best versed in ritual not merely acts, but if people fail to respond
Then he will pull up his sleeves and advance upon them. That is why it is said:
"After Tao was lost, then came the 'power';
After the 'power' was lost, then came human kindness."
After human kindness was lost, then came morality,

After morality was lost, then came ritual.

Here is another example:

Truly, if one uses the Way as one's instrument, the results will be like the Way; if one uses the "power" as instrument, the results will be like the "power". If one uses what is the reverse of the "power", the results will be the reverse of the "power". For to those who have conformed themselves to the Way, the Way readily lends its power. To those who have conformed themselves to the power, the power readily, lends more power. While to those who conform themselves to inefficacy, inefficacy readily lends its ineffectiveness.

Compare this third example:

Tao gave them birth;

The "power" of Tao reared them, Shaped them according to their kinds, Perfected them, giving to each its strength. Therefore of the ten thousand things there is not one that does not worship Tao and do homage to its "power". No mandate ever went forth that accorded to Tao the right to be worshiped, nor to its "power" the right to be worshiped, nor to its "power" the right to receive homage. It was always and of itself so. Therefore as Tao bore them and the "power" of Tao reared them, made them grow, fostered them, harboured them, brewed for them, so you must, Rear them, but not lay claim to them, Control them, but never lean upon them, Be chief among them, but not manage them.

This is called the "mysterious power."

Chapters 10 and 65 also use this xuande (玄德 "dark/mysterious de") phrase.

The second Daodejing theme is the efficacy of de for statesmanship (see meanings six and seven above). A sage ruler can acquire sufficient de to influence his subjects through, in effect, wu wei government.

You cannot rule men nor serve heaven unless you have laid up a store;

This "laying up a store" means quickly absorbing, And "quickly absorbing" means doubling one's garnered "power". Double your garnered power and it acquires a strength that nothing can overcome. If there is nothing it cannot overcome, it know no bounds,

And only what knows no bounds is huge enough to keep a whole kingdom in its grasp.

Compare this description of using one's accumulated de to affect others:

The best charioteers do not rush ahead;

The best fighters do not make displays of wrath. The greatest conqueror wins without joining issue; The best user of men acts as though he were their inferior. This is called the power that comes of not contending, Is called the capacity to use men,

The secret of being mated to heaven, to what was of old.

Mair interprets these de occurrences:

As it is used in the Tao Te Ching, te signifies the personal qualities or strengths of the individual, one's personhood. Te is determined by the sum total of one's actions, good and bad. Therefore it is possible to speak of "cultivating one's te." Like karma, te is the moral weight of a person, which may be either positive or negative. In short, te is what you are. Te represents self-nature or self-realization, only in relation to the cosmos. It is in fact the actualization of the cosmic principle in the self. Te is the embodiment of the Way and is the character of all entities in the universe. Each creature, each object has a te which is its own manifestation of the Tao.

=== The Zhuangzi ===
The Zhuangzi uses de 191 times. Many contexts praise Daoist "integrity; inner power", some mock Confucianist and Mohist "virtue", and others make de wordplays. One of the chapter titles is "De chong fu" (5, 德充符, "The Sign of Complete Virtue").

Several of the Zhuangzi translators (listed here) explain the difficulties of rendering de into English. Frederic H. Balfour succinctly glosses de with Greek and Chinese:

德. In ethics, Virtue — ἀρετή [areté "excellence"]; in physics, Energy — δύναμις [dunamis "potential power; force"]. 道 ["The Tao"] is the 體 ["body; embodiment"] of which 德 is the 用 ["use; function"].

James Legge gives this footnote to the "De Chapter":

論德, 'About the Attributes;' of Tâo, that is. It is not easy to render teh here by any other English term than 'virtue,' and yet there would be a danger of its thus misleading us in the interpretations of the chapter.
The 'virtue,' is the activity or operation of the Tâo, which is supposed to have come out of its absoluteness. Even Han Fei so defines it here, — 'Teh is the meritorious work of the Tâo.'

Fung Yu-lan cites two examples:

Next, we come to the conception of Tê, or virtue. Lao Tzŭ said:

"Tao produces a thing; Tê maintains it." – "Tao Tê Ching," 51.
Chuang Tzŭ said:
"That which things get in order to live is called Tê." – Chapter XII.

So Tê is what an individual thing receives from Tao. The total spontaneity of all things is Tao. The spontaneity that an individual thing receives from Tao is Tê. As some commentator said, the relation between Tê and Tao is just like that between the water in a river or lake, and water in general.

Burton Watson, whose translation is cited below, describes the subtle connotations:

In nearly all cases I have rendered te as "virtue" except where it has the meaning of a favor or good deed done for someone. This word presents certain difficulties in Chuang Tzu. Sometimes he employs it to mean conventional virtue — that is, virtue in the Confucian or Mo-ist sense — in which case it has bad connotations; at other times he employs it in a good sense to mean the true virtue or vital power that belongs to the man of Tao. (Compare Waley's rendering of the title Tao-te-ching as The Way and Its Power.) I prefer not to try to distinguish these two usages in the translation because I do not wish to impose upon the English a distinction that is not explicit in the original. The reader should keep in mind, incidentally, that the words "virtue" (te) and "gain" or "to get" (te) are homophones, and this fact is the basis of frequent puns and word plays — that is, the man of true Taoist virtue is one who, as we would say in English, has "got it."

Victor H. Mair differentiates Zhuangzi's contextual usages of de:

In Confucian or conventional contexts, te is translated as "virtue." In Taoist or unconventional contexts, it is translated as "integrity." The most etymologically precise equivalent in English is the archaic word "dough[tiness]."

De was central in Daoist cosmology, and the Zhuangzi frequently explains it with dao "the Way" and tian "heaven; god". Chapter twelve, "Heaven and Earth", has two good illustrations.

In the Great Beginning, there was nonbeing; there was no being, no name. Out of it arose One; there was One, but it had no form. Things got hold of it and came to life, and it was called Virtue. Before things had forms, they had their allotments; these were of many kinds, but not cut off from one another, and they were called fates. Out of the flow and flux, things were born, and as they grew they developed distinctive shapes; these were called forms. The forms and bodies held within them spirits, each with its own characteristics and limitations, and this was called the inborn nature. If the nature is trained, you may return to Virtue, and Virtue at its highest peak is identical with the Beginning. Being identical, you will be empty; being empty, you will be great. You may join in the cheeping and chirping and, when you have joined in the cheeping and chirping, you may join with Heaven and earth. Your joining is wild and confused, as though you were stupid, as though you were demented. This is called Dark Virtue. Rude and unwitting, you take part in the Great Submission.

Pervading Heaven and earth: that is the Way. Moving among the ten thousand things: that is Virtue. Superiors governing the men below them: that is called administration. Ability finding trained expression: that is called skill. Skill is subsumed in administration; administration in duty; duty in Virtue; Virtue in the Way; and the Way in Heaven. Therefore it is said, those who shepherded the world in ancient times were without desire and the world was satisfied, without action and the ten thousand things were transformed. They were deep and silent and the hundred clans were at rest. The Record says: "Stick to the One and the ten thousand tasks will be accomplished; achieve mindlessness and the gods and spirits will bow down."

Zhide (至德 "perfect/ultimate de") occurs seven times (see the punning proverb quoted below). For instance,

When a man has perfect virtue, fire cannot burn him, water cannot drown him, cold and heat cannot afflict him, birds and beasts cannot injure him. I do not say that he makes light of these things. I mean that he distinguishes between safety and danger, contents himself with fortune or misfortune, and is cautious in his comings and goings. Therefore nothing can harm him. "Hence it is said: the Heavenly is on the inside, the human is on the outside. Virtue resides in the Heavenly. Understand the actions of Heaven and man, base yourself upon Heaven, take your stand in virtue, and then, although you hasten or hold back, bend or stretch, you may return to the essential and speak of the ultimate."

The people have their constant inborn nature. To weave for their clothing, to till for their food — this is the Virtue they share. They are one in it and not partisan, and it is called the Emancipation of Heaven. Therefore in a time of Perfect Virtue the gait of men is slow and ambling; their gaze is steady and mild. In such an age mountains have no paths or trails, lakes no boats or bridges. The ten thousand things live species by species, one group settled close to another. Birds and beasts form their flocks and herds, grass and trees grow to fullest height. So it happens that you can tie a cord to the birds and beasts and lead them about, or bend down the limb and peer into the nest of the crow and the magpie. In this age of Perfect Virtue men live the same as birds and beasts, group themselves side by side with the ten thousand things. Who then knows anything about "gentleman" or "petty man"? Dull and unwitting, men have no wisdom; thus their Virtue does not depart from them. Dull and unwitting, they have no desire; this is called uncarved simplicity. In uncarved simplicity the people attain their true nature. Then along comes the sage, huffing and puffing after benevolence, reaching on tiptoe for righteousness, and the world for the first time has doubts; mooning and mouthing over his music, snipping and stitching away at his rites, and the world for the first time is divided. Thus, if the plain unwrought substance had not been blighted, how would there be any sacrificial goblets? If the white jade had not been shattered, how would there be any scepters and batons? If the Way and its Virtue had not been cast aside, how would there be any call for benevolence and righteousness? If the true form of the inborn nature had not been abandoned, how would there be any use for rites and music? If the five colors had not confused men, who would fashion patterns and hues? If the five notes had not confused them, who would try to tune things by the six tones? That the unwrought substance was blighted in order to fashion implements — this was the crime of the artisan. That the Way and its Virtue were destroyed in order to create benevolence and righteousness — this was the fault of the sage.

This parable blaming sages for losing the primordial dao and de has several Zhuangzi parallels. Here are two:

So it is said, With the sage, his life is the working of Heaven, his death the transformation of things. In stillness, he and the yin share a single Virtue; in motion, he and the yang share a single flow. He is not the bearer of good fortune, nor the initiator of bad fortune. Roused by something outside himself, only then does he respond; pressed, only then does he move; finding he has no choice, only then does he rise up. He discards knowledge and purpose and follows along with the reasonableness of Heaven. Therefore he incurs no disaster from Heaven, no entanglement from things, no opposition from man, no blame from the spirits. His life is a floating, his death a rest. He does not ponder or scheme, does not plot for the future. A man of light, he does not shine; of good faith, he keeps no promises. He sleeps without dreaming, wakes without worry. His spirit is pure and clean, his soul never wearied. In emptiness, nonbeing, and limpidity, he joins with the Virtue of Heaven. So it is said, Grief and happiness are perversions of Virtue; joy and anger are transgressions of the Way; love and hate are offenses against Virtue. When the mind is without care or joy, this is the height of Virtue. When it is unified and unchanging, this is the height of stillness. When it grates against nothing, this is the height of emptiness. When it has no commerce with things, this is the height of limpidity. When it rebels against nothing, this is the height of purity.

The Yellow Emperor said, "Do-Nothing-Say‑Nothing — he's the one who is truly right. Wild-and-Witless appears to be so. But you and I in the end are nowhere near it. Those who know do not speak; those who speak do not know. Therefore the sage practices the teaching that has no words. The Way cannot be brought to light; its virtue cannot be forced to come. But benevolence — you can put that into practice; you can discourse on righteousness, you can dupe one another with rites. So it is said, When the Way was lost, then there was virtue; when virtue was lost, then there was benevolence; when benevolence was lost, then there was righteousness; when righteousness was lost, then there were rites. Rites are the frills of the Way and the forerunners of disorder. So it is said, He who practices the Way does less every day, does less and goes on doing less, until he reaches the point where he does nothing, does nothing and yet there is nothing that is not done." Now that we've already become 'things,' if we want to return again to the Root, I'm afraid we'll have a hard time of it! The Great Man — he's the only one who might find it easy.

This theme of sagely rulers using the powers of de recurs in the "Heaven and Earth" chapter:

Heaven and Earth are huge, but they are alike in their transformations. The ten thousand things are numerous, but they are one in their good order. Human beings are many, but they are all subjects of the sovereign. The sovereign finds his source in Virtue, his completion in Heaven. Therefore it is said that the sovereign of dark antiquity ruled the world through inaction, through Heavenly Virtue and nothing more.

The man of kingly Virtue moves in simplicity and is ashamed to be a master of facts. He takes his stand in the original source and his understanding extends to the spirits. Therefore his Virtue is far‑reaching. His mind moves forth only when some external thing has roused it. Without the Way the body can have no life, and without Virtue, life can have no clarity. To preserve the body and live out life, to establish Virtue and make clear the Way — is this not kingly Virtue? Broad and boundless, suddenly he emerges, abruptly he moves, and the ten thousand things follow him — this is what is called the man of kingly Virtue.

One of the Inner Chapters has a dialogue between Confucius and Duke Ai of Lu (r. 494–468 BCE). The Duke describes meeting a hunchback named Ai Taito, who was famously ugly and charismatic, and asks about his incredible popularity, which the Master attributes to formless and water-like de.

Confucius said, "I once went on a mission to Ch'u, and as I was going along, I saw some little pigs nursing at the body of their dead mother. After a while, they gave a start and all ran away and left her, because they could no longer see their likeness in her; she was not the same as she had been before. In loving their mother, they loved not her body but the thing that moved her body. When a man has been killed in battle and people come to bury him, he has no use for his medals. When a man has had his feet amputated, he doesn't care much about shoes. For both, the thing that is basic no longer exists. When women are selected to be consorts of the Son of Heaven, their nails are not pared and their ears are not pierced. When a man has just taken a wife, he is kept in posts outside [the palace] and is no longer sent on [dangerous] missions. If so much care is taken to keep the body whole, how much more in the case of a man whose virtue is whole? Now Ai T'ai‑t'o says nothing and is trusted, accomplishes nothing and is loved, so that people want to turn over their states to him and are only afraid he won't accept. It must be that his powers are whole, though his virtue takes no form."

"What do you mean when you say his powers are whole?" asked Duke Ai.

Confucius said, "Life, death, preservation, loss, failure, success, poverty, riches, worthiness, unworthiness, slander, fame, hunger, thirst, cold, heat — these are the alternations of the world, the workings of fate. Day and night they change place before us and wisdom cannot spy out their source. Therefore, they should not be enough to destroy your harmony; they should not be allowed to enter the Spirit Storehouse. If you can harmonize and delight in them, master them and never be at a loss for joy, if you can do this day and night without break and make it be spring with everything, mingling with all and creating the moment within your own mind — this is what I call being whole in power."

"What do you mean when you say his virtue takes no form?"

"Among level things, water at rest is the most perfect, and therefore it can serve as a standard. It guards what is inside and shows no movement outside. Virtue is the establishment of perfect harmony. Though virtue takes no form, things cannot break away from it."

The Zhuangzi is famous for wordplay and witticism. Several passages make puns between de "obtain" and de "integrity; virtue". The "Autumn Floods" chapter quotes a "perfect de does not de" (至德不得) proverb; "I have heard it said, 'The Man of the Way wins no fame, the highest virtue wins no gain, the Great Man has no self.' To the most perfect degree, he goes along with what has been allotted to him.". De derogatorily means "virtue; morality" in some contexts mocking the Confucians, Mohists, and School of Names. For instance, this derision of their sophistry: "There is left, there is right, there are theories, there are debates, there are divisions, there are discriminations, there are emulations, and there are contentions. These are called the Eight Virtues.". Translating the witty words of Zhuangzi can be highly complex. A final instance mentions five types of xiongde (凶德 "bad/fiendish/terrible de"), but only lists the first one zhongde (中德 "center/middle de"). Compare these de translations by Watson ("virtue") and Mair ("integrity"):

There is no greater evil than for the mind to be aware of virtue, and to act as though it were a pair of eyes. For when it starts acting like a pair of eyes, it will peer out from within, and when it peers out from within, it is ruined. There are five types of dangerous virtue, of which inner virtue is the worst. What do I mean by inner virtue? He who possesses inner virtue will think himself always in the right, and denigrate those who do not do as he does.

There is no greater affliction than for integrity to be possessed by the mind and for the mind to be possessed by its eye. Once ruled by the mind's eye, a person looks inward, and when she looks inward she is defeated. There are five types of malevolent integrity and the chief among them is egocentric integrity. What is meant by "egocentric integrity"? She who has egocentric integrity is possessed by self-love and ridicules whatever she does not do herself.

The word bade 八德 "eight virtues/powers" first appears in the "Discussion on Making All Things Equal" chapter. Although many Zhuangzi commentators and translators try to give de "some special meaning other than its ordinary one of "virtue" in this context", notes Watson, "I believe Chuang Tzu is deliberately parodying the ethical categories of the Confucians and Mo-ists."

The Way has never known boundaries; speech has no constancy. But because of [the recognition of a] "this," there came to be boundaries. Let me tell you what the boundaries are. There is left, there is right, there are theories, there are debates, there are divisions, there are discriminations, there are emulations, and there are contentions. These are called the Eight Virtues.

Later Confucianists misread this Daoist context and moralistically interpreted bade as xiao 孝 "filial piety", di 悌 "sibling piety", zhong 忠 "loyalty; fidelity", xin 信 "trust; believe", li 禮 "ritual; rites; courtesy", yi 義 "righteousness; right conduct", lian 廉 "upright; honorable; integrity", and zhi 恥 "humility; shame".

== Confucianist usages ==
The Four Books of Confucianism give some insightful explanations of de "virtue". Note that the following quotations cite Charles Muller's scholarly translations of the Analects, Doctrine of the Mean, Great Learning, and Mencius. The more familiar translations of James Legge render ren "humaneness; human-heartedness" as "perfect virtue", which occasionally creates confusion with de as "virtue". Compare their translations of these two Analects passages.

Yen Yüan asked about [仁] perfect virtue. The Master said, "To subdue one's self and return to propriety, is perfect virtue. If a man can for one day subdue himself and return to propriety, all under heaven will ascribe perfect virtue to him. Is the practice of perfect virtue from a man himself, or is it from others?"

Yen Yüan asked about the meaning of [仁] humaneness. The Master said, "To completely overcome selfishness and keep to propriety is humaneness. If for a full day you can overcome selfishness and keep to propriety, everyone in the world will return to humaneness. Does humaneness come from oneself, or from others?"

The Master said, "Let the will be set on the path of duty. Let [德] every attainment in what is good be firmly grasped. Let [仁] perfect virtue be accorded with. Let relaxation and enjoyment be found in the polite arts."

Confucius said: "Set your aspirations on the Tao, hold to [德] virtue, rely on your [仁] humaneness, and relax in the study of the arts."

=== The Analects ===
De occurs 40 times in the Confucian Lunyu or Analects. While Confucius extolled de "virtue; morality" — "If you are virtuous, you will not be lonely. You will always have friends." (4:25) — he frequently criticized his contemporaries for having lost it. He described de as something that one can augment, and praised sage kings who governed through its compelling powers.

Confucius claimed that the rulers of ancient China had zhide "perfect/ultimate de" (see above). The two examples below mention the legendary Emperor Yao and Emperor Shun, King Wu, the founder of the Zhou dynasty, and Tai Bo, who ceded the throne to his nephew King Wen.

Confucius said: "T'ai Po can be said to have had a [至德] perfected level of virtue. He declined the rule of the kingdom three times, without the people knowing about it." (8:1)

Shun, with five ministers, was able to successfully govern the empire. King Wu said, "Altogether I have ten ministers." Confucius said, "Their ability is the issue. Don't you think so? When the T'ang [Shang] and Wu [Zhou] dynasties combined, they had as many ministers as you, with a woman and nine men. King Wen (of the Chou) controlled two-thirds of the empire, and with this, served the Yin. Indeed, the [德] virtue of Chou can be called the [至德] epitome of virtue!" (8:20)

Good government is a central Analects topic, and the following citations illustrate the importance of de for rulers and officials.

Confucius said: "He who exercises government by means of his virtue may be compared to the north polar star, which keeps its place and all the stars turn towards it." (2:1)

Confucius said: "If you govern the people legalistically and control them by punishment, they will avoid crime, but have no personal sense of shame. If you govern them by means of virtue and control them with propriety, they will gain their own sense of shame, and thus correct themselves." (2:3)

Confucius said: "The Superior Man cares about virtue; the inferior man cares about material things. The Superior Man seeks discipline; the inferior man seeks favors." (4:11)

Someone said: "What do you think of the saying: 'Repay harm with virtue'?" Confucius replied, "Then how will you repay virtue? Repay harm with Justice and repay virtue with virtue." (14:36)

Chi K'ang Tzu asked Confucius about government saying: "Suppose I were to kill the unjust, in order to advance the just. Would that be all right?" Confucius replied: "In doing government, what is the need of killing? If you desire good, the people will be good. The nature of the Superior Man is like the wind, the nature of the inferior man is like the grass. When the wind blows over the grass, it always bends." (12:19)

In this wind and grass simile, de clearly does not mean moral "virtue", but something like "nature; character". Compare these two semantically similar usages.

Confucius said: "Heaven gave birth to the virtue within me. What can Huan T'ui [who wanted to kill Confucius] do to me?" (7:22)

Confucius said: "The Southerners have a saying: 'If a man is not constant in his self-cultivation, he cannot be a shaman or a healer.' It is a good proverb. If you are not consistently developing your virtue, what can you give to others? You will not even be able to give a diagnosis." (13:22)

Confucius recurrently disparaged his Spring and Autumn period contemporaries for having diminished their natural de virtue. One notably ironic Analects passage accuses the Master himself of having lost it.

Chieh Yu, the madman of Ch'u, passed by Confucius, singing: "Phoenix! Phoenix! How your virtue has declined! Your past cannot be corrected, But your future is yet to come. Give up! Give up! Those who involve themselves in Government now Will be in danger." Confucius jumped down, wanting to talk to him, but he ran away, so Confucius couldn't talk to him. (18:5)

Here are some Confucian quotations about the rarity of people who possessed true de "virtue".

Confucius said: "Yu, those who understand virtue are few and far between." (15:3)

Confucius said: "Even over a long period of time, there have been few people who have actualized the Mean into Manifest Virtue." (6:27)

Confucius said: "I have never seen one who loves virtue as much as he loves sex." (9:17, repeated in 14:12)

Confucius said: "The virtuous will certainly have something to say, but those who have something to say are not necessarily virtuous. The humane man is always brave, but the brave man is not necessarily possessed of humaneness." (14.5)

Confucius said: "Clever words disrupt virtue. Lack of patience in small matters leads to the disruption of great plans." (15:26)

Confucius said: "The 'conventional townsman' is a thief of virtue." (17:13, cf. Mencius 7B:37)

Confucius said: "To apprehend the Tao and lecture on it before actualization is to throw away your accumulation of virtue." (17:14)

This last quote implies that de can be accumulated, and Confucius was not completely pessimistic about virtue going astray. For example, he praised his disciple Nangong Kuo as "a Superior Man, a man of enhanced virtue" (14:6). These four contexts describe de as a measurable force that one can "return," "cultivate," "extend," and "heighten".

Tseng Tzu said: "When they are careful (about their parents) to the end and continue in reverence after (their parents) are long gone, the virtue of the people will return to its natural depth." (1:9)

Confucius said: "Having virtue and not cultivating it; studying and not sifting; hearing what is just and not following; not being able to change wrongdoing: these are the things that make me uncomfortable." (7:3)

Tzu Chang said: "Keeping one's virtue without extending it; trusting the Tao without enriching it. What can you gain? And what can you get rid of?" (19:2)

Fan Chih, while strolling with the Master among the Rain Dance altars, said, "May I ask how to heighten virtue, overcome wickedness and resolve delusion?" The Master said, "An excellent question! If you take care of your responsibilities before you seek your own gain, won't this heighten your virtue? If you attack your own evil rather than the evil of others, won't you overcome wickedness? If, because of a moment's anger, you endanger your own life, as well as that of your parents, is this not delusion?" (12:21)

=== The Great Learning ===
The Da Xue or "Great Learning" is an early Confucianist text that was transmitted as a Liji chapter. The brief main passage, which is attributed to Confucius, repeats the phrase ming mingde (明明德 "brighten the bright de"), which Legge translates "illustrate illustrious virtue".

The way of great learning consists in manifesting one's bright virtue, consists in loving the people, consists in stopping in perfect goodness.... The ancients who wanted to manifest their bright virtue to all in the world first governed well their own states.

The received Great Learning includes nine commentaries. The first one was supposedly written by Zeng Zi, a disciple of Confucius. It explains mingde by quoting three Shujing sections, an otherwise unknown bathtub inscription of King Tang of Shang, and a Shijing ode.

In the "Announcement to K'ang" it is said, "He was able to [明德] manifest his virtue." The "T'ai-chia" says, "He contemplated Heaven's unveiled mandate." The "Canon of Yao" says, "he was able to [明峻德] manifest his lofty virtue."

The inscription of the bath of King T'ang said, "If you renew yourself for one day, you can renew yourself daily, and continue to do so." In the "Announcement of K'ang" it says, "carry out the renewal of the people." The Book of Odes says, "Even though Chou was an ancient state, its mandate was sustained anew." Therefore there is nothing in which the Superior Man does not fully exert himself.

=== The Doctrine of the Mean ===
The Zhongyong or Doctrine of the Mean, which like the "Great Learning" above was included in the Liji, uses de 22 times.

While Confucianist texts generally describe the de of humans, one passage portrays that of guishen (鬼神 "ghosts and spirits; gods"):

Confucius said: "The overabundance of the [德] power of spiritual beings is truly amazing! Looking for them, they cannot be seen. Listening for them, they cannot be heard. There is nothing that they do not embody. They cause the people of the world to fast for purification, and wear beautiful clothes in order to participate at the sacrifices. They are overflowing, seeming to be above, seeming to be on the left and on the right. The Book of Odes says: 'Trying to investigate the spirits, we cannot reach them. How could we possibly grasp them with our thoughts?' The manifestation of the subtle and the inconcealability of sincerity is like this."

Note how the Doctrine of the Mean attributes almost mystical powers to cheng (誠 "sincerity; truth; honesty"):

Sincerity is just 'perfecting' and the Way is just 'following.' Sincerity is the beginning and end of all things. Without sincerity there is nothing. Thus the Superior Man values the process of "becoming-sincere." But sincerity is not "just-perfecting"; it also means "perfecting all things." To perfect yourself, you need jen. To perfect others, you need wisdom. The [德] virtue of our nature is that it is none other than the Way by which inner and outer are merged. Thus we can always use it to set things right.

Only that person who has fully actualized sincerity is able to adjust the strings of the Great Net of the World; is able to establish himself in the Great Root of the World; is able to understand the transformations and the nurturing of Heaven and Earth. So sincere is his jen; so unfathomable is his depth; so vast is his spaciousness. Who is able to understand this, but one who has the firm, acute, luminous sagely intelligence – who is permeated with [天德] Heavenly Virtue?

Two passages use the compound dade (大德 "big/great de):

What a good son was Shun (the sage emperor)! His [德] virtue was that of a sage, he was venerated as an emperor. His wealth included everything within the Four Seas. He is sacrificed to in the ancestral temple, and his sons and grandsons have preserved his name. Therefore we can say that the [大德] greatly virtuous always attain their appropriate position, always receive their proper reward, always get their recognition and are always long-lived.

Confucius transmitted the legacy of (sage-emperors) Yao and Shun and modeled his character on that of (sage-kings) Wen and Wu. He was ruled by the Heavenly seasons from above, and combined the Earth and Waters below. He was like Heaven and Earth, which have nothing they do not support, and nothing they do not cover. His function was like the revolution of the four seasons, the alternation of sun and moon. He nourishes the myriad things and they grow up together without harming each other, and they follow their courses simultaneously without interfering with each other. His [小德] smaller power is like the rivers and streams. His [大德] great power is seen in deep transformations. This is why Heaven and Earth are called "great."

The Doctrine of the Mean also mentions the concept of zhide "perfect de":

How great is the Way of the sage! Superabundant, it develops all things, extending up to Heaven. How excellent it is! It embraces the three hundred rules of ceremony, and the three thousand rules of conduct; it waits for the right person and then functions. Hence it is said: "If you do not [至德] perfect your virtue, the [至道] perfect Way cannot be actualized." Therefore the Superior Man esteems his [德] virtuous nature and follows the path of inquiry, extending himself in breadth and greatness, penetrating all subtleties, penetrating its height and brilliance, following the course of the actualization of the Mean. He reviews the old and learns the new, thickening his character through the valorization of propriety.

=== The Mencius ===
De 德 "virtue; character" occurs 41 times in the Mengzi or Mencius. Many occurrences are in quotations, for instance 6A6 and 6A17 quote Shijing odes 260 and 247. Mencius frequently quotes Confucius about de; 3A4 quotes the Lunyu 12:19 wind and grass metaphor, and 7B37 quotes 17:13 about "Conventional townsmen are thieves of virtue." Three common de thematic usages are that wise rulers can utilize its powers, should employ people with de, and should understand how it affects friendship.

The first and most frequent Mencian teaching is that a ruler should develop his de as a means of controlling people:

The king said: "What kind of [德] qualities are necessary for real kingship?" Mencius said: "Take care of the people, and no one can oppose you."

There was king Wen, moreover, with all the virtue which belonged to him; and who did not die till he had reached a hundred years — and still his influence had not penetrated throughout the kingdom.

Mencius said, "He who uses force as a pretense of Humaneness is the de-facto strongman among the princes. But such a strongman must have a large state in order to be effective. The man who uses his virtue to practice Humaneness is the true king. To be a real king you don't need an especially large territory. T'ang did it with only seventy li and King Wen did it with only one hundred li. When you use your power to force people into submission, they will never submit with their hearts; it is only because they don't have enough strength to resist. When people submit to virtue, they are happy from the bottom of their hearts, and they submit sincerely, the way the seventy disciples submitted to Confucius."

Mencius said, 'When right government prevails in the kingdom, princes of little virtue are submissive to those of great, and those of little worth to those of great. When bad government prevails in the kingdom, princes of small power are submissive to those of great, and the weak to the strong. Both these cases are the rule of Heaven. They who accord with Heaven are preserved, and they who rebel against Heaven perish.

Wan Chang asked Mencius, saying, 'People say, "When the disposal of the kingdom came to Yü, his virtue was inferior to that of Yâo and Shun, and he transmitted it not to the worthiest but to his son." Was it so?' Mencius replied, 'No; it was not so. When Heaven gave the kingdom to the worthiest, it was given to the worthiest. When Heaven gave it to the son of the preceding sovereign, it was given to him. ... 'In the case of a private individual obtaining the throne, there must be in him virtue equal to that of Shun or Yü; and moreover there must be the presenting of him to Heaven by the preceding sovereign. It was on this account that Confucius did not obtain the throne.'

Mencius said, 'The administration of government is not difficult — it lies in not offending the great families. He whom the great families affect, will be affected by the whole State; and he whom any one State affects, will be affected by the whole kingdom. When this is the case, such an [sic] one's virtue and teachings will spread over all within the four seas like the rush of water.'

'Confucius said, "The flowing progress of virtue is more rapid than the transmission of royal orders by stages and couriers."'

Note how these last two examples describe rapidly flowing powers of de.

The second related theme is that rulers should seek out and employ those individuals who have de.

If a prince hates disgrace, the best course for him to pursue, is to esteem virtue and honour virtuous scholars, giving the worthiest among them places of dignity, and the able offices of trust.

Mencius said: "Humaneness brings glory and non-Humaneness brings disgrace. So if you hate disgrace but still involve yourself in what is not Humaneness, it is like hating moisture and living in a basement. If you really hate it, you should honor virtue and respect the good. Install good men into positions of rank and give jobs to people of ability."

Therefore a prince who is to accomplish great deeds will certainly have ministers whom he does not call to go to him. When he wishes to consult with them, he goes to them. The prince who does not honour the virtuous, and delight in their ways of doing, to this extent, is not worth having to do with.

Chien asked, "How do you go about 'just being content'?" Mencius said, "If you value virtue and enjoy Rightness, you can be content. Hence the gentleman in dire straits does not lose his sense of Rightness, and when successful, does not lose the Path. Since he does not lose his sense of Rightness when in dire straits, the gentleman is able to keep a grasp on himself. Since he does not lose the Path when he becomes successful, the people are not disappointed in him."

Hsien-ch'iû Mang asked Mencius, saying, 'There is the saying, "A scholar of complete virtue may not be employed as a minister by his sovereign, nor treated as a son by his father." ... Mencius replied, 'No. These are not the words of a superior man. They are the sayings of an uncultivated person of the east of Qi.'

A third theme in Mencius is the connection between de and friendship.

Wan Chang asked Mencius, saying, 'I venture to ask the principles of friendship.' Mencius replied, 'Friendship should be maintained without any presumption on the ground of one's superior age, or station, or the circumstances of his relatives. Friendship with a man is friendship with his virtue, and does not admit of assumptions of superiority.'

During the frequent interviews of the duke Mû with Tsze-sze, he one day said to him, "Anciently, princes of a thousand chariots have yet been on terms of friendship with scholars — what do you think of such an intercourse?" Tsze-sze was displeased, and said, "The ancients have said, 'The scholar should be served:' how should they have merely said that he should be made a friend of?" When Tsze-sze was thus displeased, did he not say within himself, — "With regard to our stations, you are sovereign, and I am subject. How can I presume to be on terms of friendship with my sovereign! With regard to our virtue, you ought to make me your master. How can you be on terms of friendship with me?" Thus, when a ruler of a thousand chariots sought to be on terms of friendship with a scholar, he could not obtain his wish — how much less could he call him to his presence!'

One final example of Confucian de usages is this context where the word has a markedly negative meaning, semantically opposed to moral "virtue".

Mencius said, 'Qiu acted as chief officer to the head of the Ji family, whose [德] evil ways he was unable to change, while he exacted from the people double the grain formerly paid.'

== In divination ==
Several Mawangdui (before 168 BCE) texts named Xingde 刑德 ("Punishment and Virtue") describe de as a mantic function related to the sexagenary cycle and the astronomical notion of the Nine Palaces (zh:九宮).
