= Tai Jia =

Tai Jia 太甲
- King of Shang dynasty
- Reign: 1623–1611 BCE
- Predecessor: Da Ding
- Spouse: Bi Xin (妣辛)
- Issue: Wo Ding, Tai Geng
Full name
- Family name: Zǐ (子); Given name: Zhì (至)
Posthumous name
- Tai Jia (太甲)
Temple name
- Taizong (太宗)
- Father: Da Ding

Tai Jia (Chinese: 太甲) or Da Jia, personal name Zǐ Zhì, was the son of Prince Da Ding and a king of the ancient Chinese Shang dynasty.

== Family ==
Tai Jia was the son of Da Ding and grandson of Tang of Shang, who himself was a descendant of Xie, Emperor Ku, and the Yellow Emperor. He had at least one consort, Bi Xin,and two sons, Wo Ding and Tai Geng, though only the latter is attested in oracle bones.

== Reign ==
Oracle bones are largely silent regarding Tai Jia's reign, leaving post-Zhou dynasty accounts of it to fill in the blanks. This is largely due to Tai Jia being an Early Shang ruler, and extant oracle bones largely come from divinations performed during the reign of Wu Ding onwards.

According to Records of the Grand Historian by Sima Qian, Tai Jia was the fourth Shang king, succeeding his uncles Wai Bing and Zhong Ren. He was enthroned in 1535 BCE with Yi Yin as his prime minister and Bo (亳) as his capital. However, Oracle script inscriptions on bones unearthed at Yinxu alternatively record that Tai Jia was the third Shang king, succeeding his father Da Ding (大丁), given the posthumous name Da Jia (大甲), and succeeded by his brother Bu Bing (卜丙).

Sima describes Tai Jia as an autocratic ruler who treated his people badly and broke his own laws. A few years into his reign, internal disorder was prevalent in his the court. His Prime Minister, Yi Yin, advised him to change his ways, but the headstrong king ignored the advice of the elder statesman. Eventually, Yi Yin had no other choice but to exile the king to Tonggong (桐宫) (Note: Literally translated to Tung tree palace, archaic name for the tomb of Tang of Shang) in present-day southwest Yanshi county, Henan to repent. Following the exile, Yi Yin ruled the country as regent for three years, until he felt that the king had sufficiently changed and invited him back to the capital to reclaim his throne. From that point on, the king took care of his people and managed the government well. So that in the 10th year of his reign Yi Yin resigned from his post and retired, honoring the king, after his death, as Zhong Zong (中宗).

The Bamboo Annals however tell a very different story; claiming that after the exile Yi Yin seized the throne and ruled as king for seven years later until Tai Jia secretly returned to the palace and killed his former Prime Minister. Afterwards the king assigned Yi Yin's land and castle to his sons, Yi She (伊陟) and Yi Fen (伊奋).

As archaeological evidence shows that Yi Yin was still worshipped by the Shang people several hundred years after his death, the account given by Sima Qian is widely considered more reliable. According to both sources the king ruled for 12 years before death. He was given the posthumous name Tai Jia (太甲) and was succeeded by his son Wo Ding (沃丁).

== Notes ==
Tai Jia Shang dynasty
Regnal titles
Preceded by Da Ding	King of China	Succeeded by Bu Bing
