= Zhong Ren =

Zhòng Rén
- King of Shang dynasty
- Reign: 1627–1623 BCE
- Predecessor: Bu Bing
- Successor: Tai Jia
Full name
- Family name: Zǐ (子); Given name: Yōng (庸)
Posthumous name
- Zhòng Rén (仲壬)

Zhong Ren (Chinese: 仲壬, personal name Zǐ Yōng, 子庸) is traditionally held to be a Shang dynasty King of China.

In the Records of the Grand Historian he was listed by Sima Qian as the third Shang king, succeeding his father Tang (唐) and elder brother Wai Bing.

He was enthroned in the year of Dingchou (丁丑) with Yi Yin (伊尹) as his prime minister and Bo (亳) as his capital. He ruled for 4 years before his death.

He was given the posthumous name Zhong Ren (仲壬) and was succeeded by his nephew Tai Jia (太甲).

Oracle script inscriptions on bones unearthed at Yinxu do not list him as one of the Shang kings.

Zhong Ren Shang dynasty
Regnal titles
Preceded by Wai Bing	King of China	Succeeded by Tai Jia
