= Yi Yin =

Chinese chancellor

- 伊尹
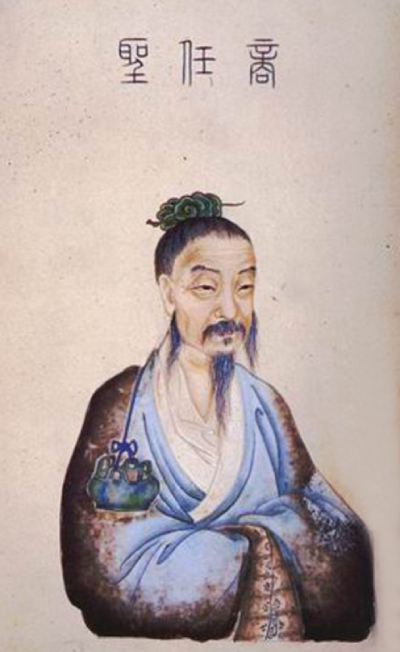
- Painting of Yi Yin, made during the reign of the Qianlong Emperor, Qing dynasty.
- Born: Yi Zhi (伊挚) c. 1649 BC
- Died: c. 1550 BC
- Other names: Family name: Yi (伊); Given name: Zhi (挚); Alternate names: A Heng (阿衡), Yi Yin (伊尹)
- Occupations: Chef, politician
- Known for: Serving Tang of Shang; overthrowing Xia dynasty; serving Tai Jia
- Children: Yi She (伊陟); Yi Fen (伊奋)
- Military career
- Allegiance: Predynastic Shang
- Conflicts: Battle of Mingtiao

Minister of the Right for the Shang dynasty
- Monarchs: Tang; Bu Bing; Zhong Ren; Tai Jia; Wo Ding

Chinese name
- Chinese: 伊尹
Transcriptions
Standard Mandarin
- Hanyu Pinyin: Yī Yǐn
Old Chinese
- Baxter–Sagart (2014): *ʔij m-qurʔ

Yi Yin (c. 1649 B.C. to c. 1550 B.C., Chinese: 伊尹, born Yī Zhì (伊挚), also known as A Heng (阿衡)), was a Chinese politician who served as a Minister of the Right for Predynastic Shang and the early Shang dynasty. He encouraged and helped Tang of Shang, the founder of the Shang dynasty, defeat Jie of Xia at the Battle of Mingtiao. Oracle inscriptions of Yi have been found, implying his social status was high; for example, on one occasion, a sacrifice made to him coincided with the day in which Bao Ding was to be venerated.

== Biography ==
=== Origin ===
According to legend, Yi was a slave of a man named Youshen (有莘). When Youshen's daughter married Tang of Shang as part of a dowry, he became Tang's slave. He was gifted in cooking, so Tang made him his chef and taught him how to balance the five flavours (sweet, sour, bitter, pungent, and salty) and the duration of heating foods. While he served Tang his meals, he used this opportunity to analyse the current issues of the time, such as the bad points of Jie of Xia. He also proposed his plan to overthrow Jie of Xia. He earned Tang's trust, became Tang's right-hand man and was made 'Yin (尹)', meaning "minister". His contemporary, Zhong Hui, served as the Minister of the Left.

However, other versions of his life exist. In another story, Yi had never been enslaved. Tang had heard of him and tried five times to recruit him before Yi accepted his request for help. Additionally, Mencius fiercely denies the story of Yi Yin being a cook at all when asked by Wan Zhang, saying he was a farmer.

=== Serving Tang of Shang ===
Tang moved to a place where the Xia capital was easily accessible. They stopped paying Jie taxes. Jie was furious and summoned the armies of his nine tribes to fight Tang. Then Yi assured Tang to wait for Jie of Xia's armies to drop in power. He explained to Tang that the noblemen who served Jie still had strong armies. So, they waited for a year until they launched an attack into the noblemen's states and won every battle.

However, when they were only five li from the capital, Yi called for a stop. He explained that the army needed a boost in morale, so Tang gave a speech to the soldiers, which became known as 'Tang's pledge' (湯誥, now in Shangshu). Afterwards, they defeated Jie of Xia in the decisive Battle of Mingtiao.

During the early Shang dynasty, Yi helped Tang set up different institutions, resulting in political stability and economic benefits.

=== Subsequent rulers and death ===
After Tang died, two of his sons succeeded in gaining the throne, but they both died early. Therefore, Yi Yin was ruled as a regent by Tang's grandson, Taijia of Shang. What follows is still being determined. According to a popular theory, Yi wrote three essays to Taijia regarding his rule (伊訓 chapter of the Shangshu). After reading the essays, Taijia adhered to them for the first two years but failed to do so from the third. He started to rule as he pleased and no longer followed any of the laws that the ancients had followed. He oppressed his subjects. He did not listen to Yi's advice. Seeing that Taijia would not give in, Yi banished the king to Tonggong(桐宮, archaic name for the tomb of Tang) and became the temporary ruler of China. Alternately (太甲 chapters in the Shangshu), Yi approached Taijia with several oral warnings which were not heeded, causing Taijia's exile. The measure was successful, and the king transformed.

After three years, Taijia was released, and Yi and some officials returned Taijia to the capital and returned Taijia's power. He started to use less oppressive laws and ruled the kingdom correctly. After Taijia's death, the next king, Woding of Shang, took over. In Woding's eighth year as king, Yi died. According to some legends, he was one hundred years old. Woding arranged a funeral for Yi Yin, which was made for the king. He sacrificed cattle, sheep and swine and mourned for three years.

Although this story is recorded in the Records of the Grand Historian, Mencius, and Zuo Zhuan, the Bamboo Annals records otherwise, according to this version, Yi and Taijia were, in fact, fighting for power. Yi had banished Taijia to his grandfather's tomb and then seized absolute power for seven years. Taijia escaped, murdered Yi and returned the throne. However, archaeological evidence based on contemporary records in oracle bone script showed that Yi was still worshipped by the Shang people, including the royal family, several hundred years after his death, calling the reliability of the latter account into question.

== Veneration in Oracle bones ==
Yi Yin is venerated in around 40 oracle bone inscriptions, which are not only the earliest accounts of his existence, but also contradict narratives given in the Bamboo Annals that once gave a narrative of him being a usurper. In these inscriptions, Yi Yin is consulted for counsel on matters such as rain, and occasionally given sacrifices, such as the following:

乙亥貞其侑伊尹二牛
On the yihai day, scapulimancy was performed. Test: May we perform a you-sacrifice to Yi Yin? Two oxen.

辛卯卜侑于伊尹一羌一牢
On the xinmao day, scapulimancy was performed. Should we perform a you-sacrifice to Yi Yin? One person of Qiang and one domestic ox.

In one oracle bone inscription, he is given a you sacrifice alongside five of the Six Spirits, placing him in extremely high regard in the Shang state religion:

甲申卜侑伊尹五示
On the jiashen day, scapulimancy was performed. Should we perform a you-sacrifice to Yi Yin and Five Spirits?

== Posthumous accounts ==
Yi Yin is featured in several works as an active participant, though they are all from a post-Shang environment and thus their certainty is disputed. This is especially notable given the Zhou dynasty often edited Shang dynasty accounts. However, excavations at Mawangdui that rediscovered Yi Yin's "Nine Rulers" dialogue (九主) and the release of the Tsinghua Bamboo Slips's Announcement of Yin (尹誥) under the name of Yin's Oath (尹诰) have led to increased confidence that Yi Yin's character is, at least partially, true.

=== In the received Book of Documents ===
Yi Yin is recorded in several works in the Book of Documents, including one where he is the direct speaker. However, as the text itself is a received one and—once-lost at the hands of Qin Shi Huang before being reconstructed by Fu Sheng—their legitimacy is considered questionable.

During the twelfth month of the first year of Tai Jia's reign (c. 1623, after the death of Tang of Shang, Yi Yin dictated The Instructions of Yi 《尹訓》. This was a crowning ceremony for Tai Jia, where a sacrifice was made to Tang, and Tai Jia was presented before the altar. Yi Yin speaks to the virtue of Tang, and then the virtue of Yu the Great, before warning Tai Jia of the perils of alcohol that Tang had allegedly warned of. However, in Tai Jia I (太甲上), it is recorded that these warnings were not heard, leading to his eventual expulsion in Tai Jia III (太甲下).

The accounts above are traditionally considered to be forgeries, mainly due to contradictions displayed by the Bamboo Annals during the Jin dynasty. Within the Bamboo Annals, it is stated that Yi Yin had actually seized the throne and ruled Shang for seven years, before Tai Jia returned and killed him, assigning Yi Yin's land to his sons, Yi She (伊陟) and Yi Fen (伊奋). However, oracle bone evidence showing ancestor veneration of Yi Yin heavily implies he received praise rather than scorn, which has cast doubt on the idea. Comparative evidence made using excavated texts have noted that The Announcement of Yi in particular seems to have been written by a different scribe.

=== In the Bamboo Annals ===
The Bamboo Annals are a chronicle of ancient Chinese history concluding around 299 BC. They were unearthed during the Western Jin dynasty, but due to poor preservation, quotations are spotty. Regardless, it is a valuable source of information. However, key details, such as one claiming he usurped the throne of Tai Jia, are contradicted by the fact Yi Yin is venerated by the Shang in oracle bones.

In total, Yi Yin is mentioned six times in the Bamboo Annals.

1. In the 17th year of King Jie of Xia's reign, Shang requested Yi Yin come to [the Xia] court. (Note: 十七年，商使伊尹來朝。)
2. In the 20th year of King Jie's reign, Yi Yin returned to Shang with Ru Jiu and Ru Fang, meeting at the northern gate. (Note: 二十年，伊尹歸于商及汝鳩、汝方，會于北門。)
3. In the first year of Wai Bing, Wai Bing ascended the throne, was throned in Bo, and ordered Yi Yin as minister. (Note: 元年乙亥，即位，居亳，命卿士伊尹。)
4. In the first year of Zhong Ren, on a dingchou day, the king ascended, was throned in Bo, and ordered Yi Yin as minister. (Note: 元年丁丑，王即位，居亳，命卿士伊尹。)
5. In the first year of Tai Jia's reign, on a xinsi day, the king ascended and was throned in Bo, ordering Yi Yin as minister. Yi Yin exiled Tai Jia to Tong, and then enthroned himself. (Note: 元年辛巳，王即位，居亳，命卿士伊尹。伊尹放太甲于桐，乃自立。)
6. In the seventh year, the king secretly left Tong and killed Yi Yin. The sky left a thick fog for three days, and so he established the sons Yi She and Yi Fen, ordering they are given the farmland and houses owned by Yi Yin are restored to them. (Note: 七年，王潛出自桐，殺伊尹。天大霧三日，乃立其子伊陟、伊奮，命復其父之田宅而中分之。)

=== In the Arrival of Yin ===
The Arrival of Yin (尹至) was illegally excavated in the 1970s before eventually being transcribed and released in volume 1 of the Tsinghua Bamboo Slips cache. It details his return from an excursion to Xia.

惟尹自夏徂亳，逯至在湯。湯曰：「格！汝其有吉志！」尹曰：「后！我來越今旬日。余美其有夏眾不吉好，其有后厥志其喪，寵二玉，弗虞其有眾。民率曰：『余及汝偕亡。』惟災虐極，暴動，亡典。夏有祥，在西在東，見章於天。其有民率曰：『惟我速禍。』咸曰：『曷今東祥不章？』今其如台？」湯曰：「汝告我夏隱，率若時？」尹曰：「若時。」湯盟誓及尹，茲乃柔大縈。湯往征弗附。摯度，摯德不僭。自西翦西邑，戡其有夏。夏料民，入於水，曰戰。帝曰：「一勿遺。」

When Yi Yin went from Xia to Bo, he quickly arrived at the court of Tang. Tang said: "Come! You must have good news to report!" Yi Yin said: "Milord! I have been travelling for ten days now. I may hazard that the people of Xia have inauspicious interests. The will of their ruler is lost; he will take two jade objects and give nary a thought to his people's coming demise. The people all say: "I will perish along with you." The calamities and cruelties are extreme; there is violence and unrest; it is essentially lawless. In Xia, there are auspicious signs, in the west and in the east, which manifest brightly in the sky. Their people all say: "We are hastening disaster." All will say: "Why are the eastern signs not manifesting now?" What is to be made of this?"

Tang said: "You have told me the concealed [truths] of Xia. Is it indeed like this?" Yi Yin said: "Verily so."

Tang swore an oath with Yi Yin. Thereupon they performed a great sacrifice. Tang then went on a campaign against those who did not submit. Yi Yin (Yi Zhi 摯) made plans; Yi Yin's virtue was without error. From the west, he attacked from the west and subdued the Xia. Xia mustered its people and entered the water, declaring battle. Di said: "Do not leave a single one [alive]."

=== In the Announcement of Yin ===
The Announcement of Yin (尹誥) was illegally excavated before being handed into the Tsinghua Bamboo Slips collection. It was then deciphered and released in Volume 1 in 2012. It follows the same writing style as the Arrival of Yin. It is similar in content, but distinctly different in prose, from Both Possessed Pure Virtue (咸有一德) seen in the received Book of Documents.

惟尹既及湯，咸有一德。尹念天之敗西邑夏，曰：「夏自絕其有民，亦唯厥眾，非民無與守邑。我翦滅夏，今后曷不監？」執告湯曰：「我克協我友。今唯民遠邦、歸志。」湯曰：「於乎！吾何作於民，俾我眾勿違朕言？」摯曰：「后其賚之，其有夏之金玉田邑，舍之吉言。」乃致眾于亳中邑。

When Yi Yin had joined with Tang, they both possessed pure virtue. Yi Yin, reflecting on Heaven's destruction of the Western City of Xia, said: "Xia cut itself off from its people, and also from its masses. Without the people, there is no one to guard the city. Their sovereign created resentment amongst the people, and the people returned with divided hearts. We have cut down and destroyed the Xia. Now, milord, why not learn from this?" Seizing the moment to instruct Tang, he said: "We have been able to unite our allies. But now the people are distant from their state and their hearts are set on returning home."

Tang said: "Alas! What should I do for these people, so that my own will not oppose my words?"

Yi Yin (Zhi) replied: "Milord...you should reward them. Grant them the bronze, jade, fields, and return their towns and homes, and bestow upon them nice platitudes."

Thereupon, he assembled the people in the central city of Bo.

Paleographic evidence implies that The Announcement of Yin had been transmitted in the Book of Rites's Zi Yi 緇衣 chapter as The Auspiciousness of Yin 尹吉, having been inadvertently corrupted by Han scribes:

《尹吉》曰：『惟尹躬及湯，咸有壹德。』

The Announcement of Yin says (Shu, IV, vi, 3), "There were I, Yin, and Tang; both possessed the same pure virtue."

《尹吉》曰：『惟尹躬天，見於西邑；夏自周有終，相亦惟終。』

It is said in the Announcement of Yin (Shu, III, v, sect. 1, 3), "I have seen it myself in Xia with its western capital, that when its sovereigns went through a prosperous course to the end, their ministers also did the same."
-- James Legge translation, 1885

=== In Nine Rulers ===
The Nine Rulers shows a conversation between Yi Yin and Tang of Shang. It was excavated from Mawangdui, and the documented text was found written on the reverse of one of two versions of Laozi.

== Attributed works ==
The following is a list of works purported to have been made by Yi Yin or otherwise spoken by him and written down by a scribe. Texts that attribute them to him are in brackets.

- The Announcement of Yin《尹誥》
- Nine Rulers《九主》(Records of the Grand Historian)
- The Instructions of Yi 《尹訓》 (The Book of Documents)
- Decrees of Si 《肆命》(The Book of Documents)
- Ancestor's Last Days 《徂後》 (The Book of Documents)
- Tai Jia I-III 《太甲》 (The Book of Documents, quoted)

== Legacy and Evaluation ==
=== In Confucianism ===
Mencius is often pressed about Yi Yin in his eponymous book, particularly by Gongsun Chou, and grapples with his banishment of Tai Jia when his reign allegedly went awry. In the end, he declared that Yi Yin was not a usurper because of his purpose. This has led to evaluations of whether Mencius was a consequentialist.

公孫丑曰：「伊尹曰：『予不狎于不順。』放太甲于桐，民大悅。太甲賢。又反之，民大悅。賢者之為人臣也，其君不賢，則固可放與？」
Gong Sun Chou said, 'Yi Yin said, "I cannot be near and see him so disobedient to reason," and therewith he banished Tai Jia to Tong. The people were much pleased. When Tai Jia became virtuous, he brought him back, and the people were again much pleased. When worthies are ministers, may they indeed banish their sovereigns in this way when they are not virtuous?'

孟子曰：「有伊尹之志，則可；無伊尹之志，則篡也。」
Mencius replied, 'If they have the same purpose as Yi Yin, they may. If they have not the same purpose, it would be usurpation.'

== Gallery ==
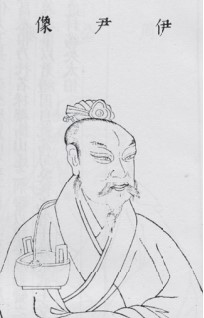
Portrait of Yi Yin, 1607

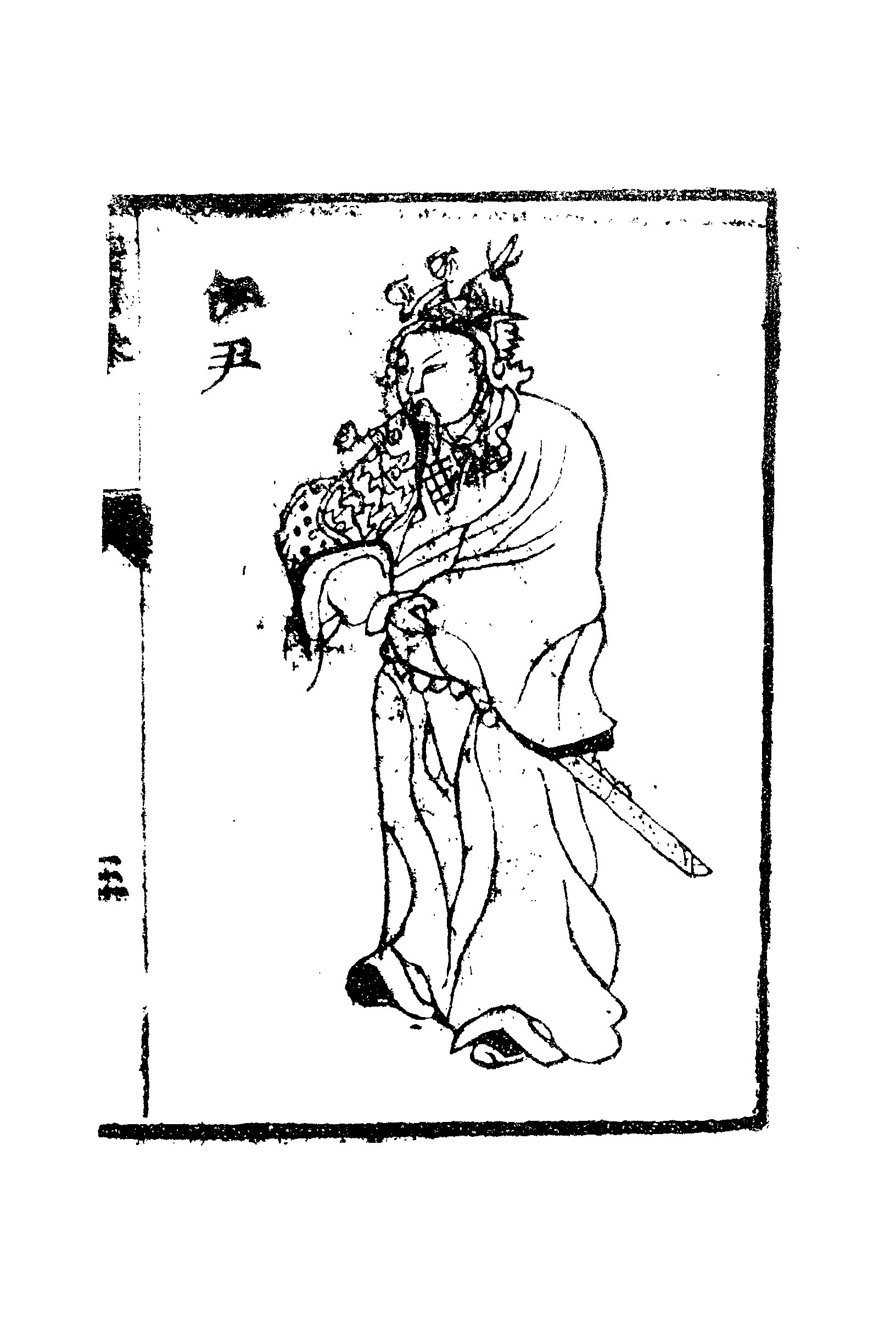
Depiction of Yi Yin on the Xiashanghezhuan (夏商合傳), thought to be a work in the Era of the Ming-Qing dynasty

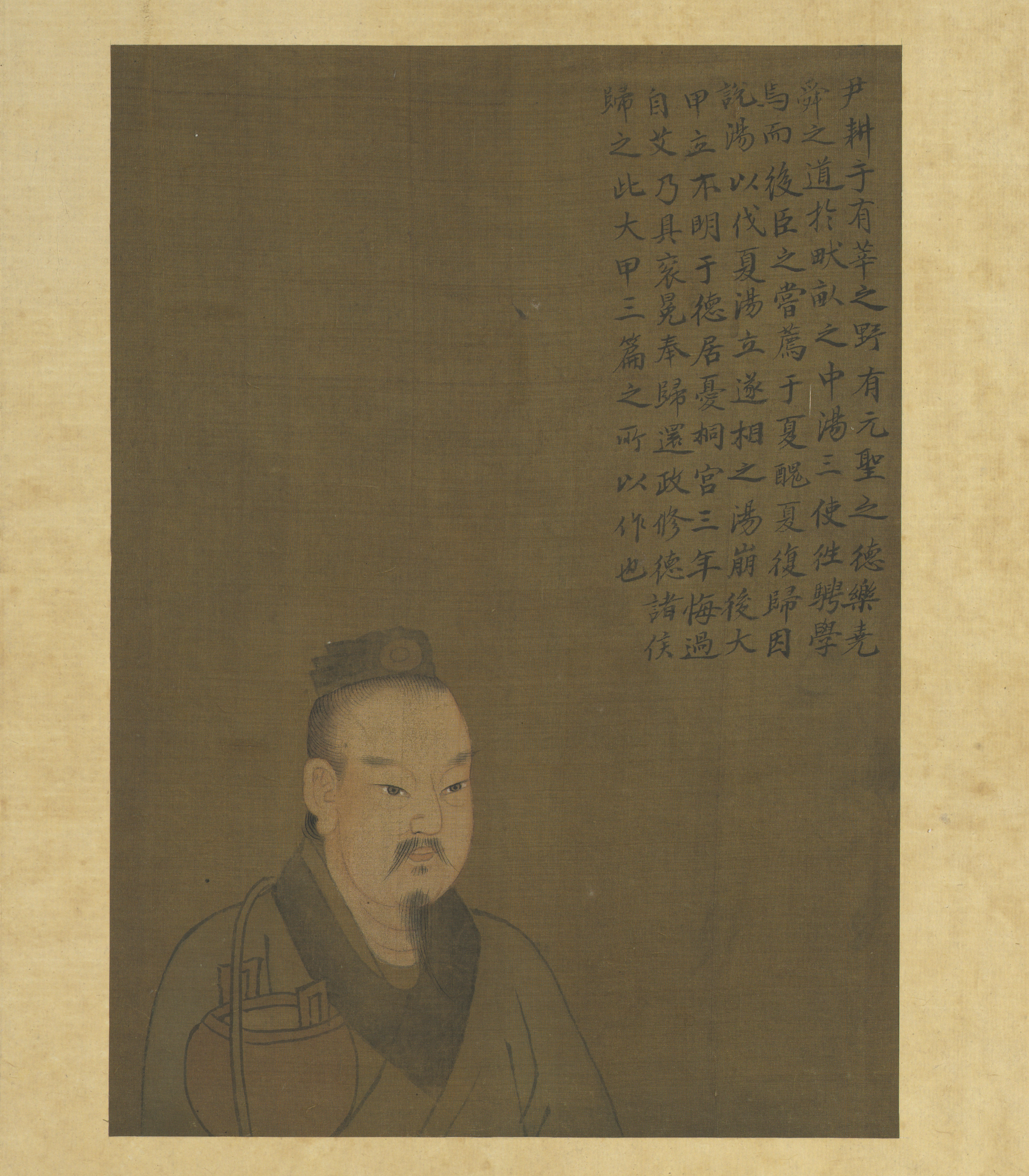
Portrait of Yi Yin (National Palace Museum)
