= Tai Geng =

Tai Geng 太庚
- King of Shang dynasty
- Reign: 1592–1567 BC
- Predecessor: Bu Bing or Wo Ding
- Successor: Xiao Jia
- Spouse: Bi Ren (妣壬)
- Issue: Xiao Jia, Tai Wu, Yong Ji
Full name
- Family name: Zi (子); Given name: Bian (辨)
- Father: Tai Jia

Tai Geng (Chinese: 太庚; pinyin: Tài Gēng; Wade–Giles: T'ai-Keng) or Da Geng, personal name Zi Bian (子辨), was a king of the Shang dynasty of ancient China.

In the Records of the Grand Historian he was listed by Sima Qian as the sixth Shang king, succeeding his brother Wo Ding (沃丁). He was enthroned with Bo (亳) as his capital. He ruled for 25 years (although the Bamboo Annals claim 5 years), was given the posthumous name Tai Geng and was succeeded by his son Xiao Jia (小甲).

Oracle script inscriptions on bones unearthed at Yinxu alternatively record that he was the fifth Shang king succeeding his uncle Bu Bing (卜丙), given the posthumous name Da Geng (大庚) and succeeded by his brother Xiao Jia.

Tai Geng Shang dynasty
Regnal titles
Preceded by Bu Bing	King of China	Succeeded by Xiao Jia
