= Xiao Jia =

Xiao Jia 小甲
- King of Shang dynasty
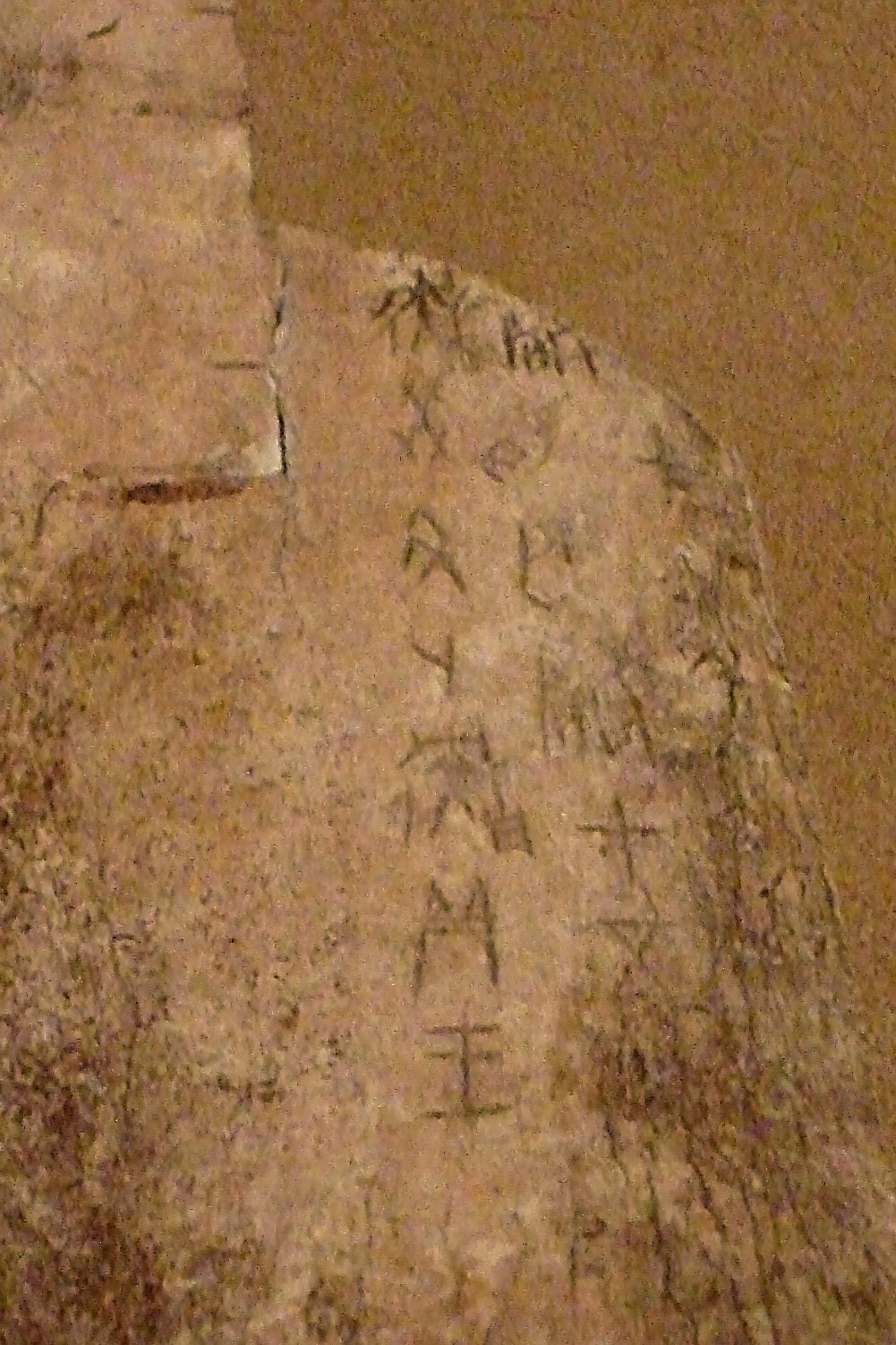
- Oracle bone describing a ruler consulting Xiao Jia about whether there will be misfortune over the next ten days.
- Predecessor: Tai Geng
- Successor: Da Wu
Full name
- Family name: Zi (子); Given name: Gao (高)
Temple name
- Xiao Jia (小甲)
- Father: Tai Geng

Xiao Jia (Chinese: 小甲; pinyin: Xiǎo Jiǎ; Wade–Giles: Hsiao-Chia), personal name Zi Gao (子高), was a Shang dynasty King of China.

In the Records of the Grand Historian he was listed by Sima Qian as the seventh Shang king, succeeding his father Tai Geng (太庚). He was enthroned in the year of Dingsi (丁巳) with Bo (亳) as his capital. He ruled for 4 years, was given the posthumous name Xiao Jia and was succeeded by brother Yong Ji (雍己).

Inscriptions on bones unearthed at Yinxu alternatively record that he was the sixth Shang king succeeding his brother Da Geng (大庚), given the posthumous name Xiao Jia (小甲) and succeeded by his nephew Da Wu (大戊).

Xiao Jia Shang dynasty
Regnal titles
Preceded by Da Geng	King of China	Succeeded by Da Wu
