= Da Ding =

King of Shang dynasty

Da Ding 大丁
- Reign: c. 1587 BC - ?
- Spouse: Bi Wu (妣戊)
- Issue: Tai Jia
Full name
- Family name: Zi (子); Given name: unknown
Temple name
- Tài Dīng (太丁)
- Father: Tang

Da Ding (Chinese: 大丁; pinyin: Dà Dīng) or Tai Ding (Chinese: 太丁; pinyin: Tài Dīng) was the eldest son of King Tang, but sources are conflicted as to whether he actually succeeded his father as the second king of the Shang dynasty or not.

== Records ==
In the Records of the Grand Historian he was said by Sima Qian to have died at an early age without succeeding his father King Tang. He was given the posthumous name Tai Ding (Chinese: 太丁) and the throne passed to his younger brother Wai Bing and later to his own son Tai Jia.

== Nicknames ==
Although not well known he is not unknown in this day and age, often in China today he is referred to as Yi Zi (Chinese: 遺子).

== Succession ==
Inscriptions on oracle bones unearthed at Yinxu record that he was the second Shang king, given the posthumous name Da Ding (Chinese: 大丁), and succeeded by his sons Da Jia (Tai Jia) and Bu Bing (Wai Bing).

== Death ==
Historian Simon Montefiore in his book The World: A Family History of Humanity, refers to an inscription that refers to Da Ding's death: "Da Jia and Zu Yi, 100 cups of wine, 100 qiang prisoners, 300 head of cattle."

== Notes ==
Da Ding Shang dynasty
Regnal titles
Preceded by Tang	King of China	Succeeded by Da Jia
