= Wo Ding =

Wo Ding 沃丁
- King of Shang dynasty
- Successor: Tai Geng
Full name
- Family name: Zi (子); Given name: Xuan (绚)
Posthumous name
- Wo Ding (沃丁)
- Father: Tai Jia

Wo Ding (Chinese: 沃丁, personal name Xuan, (绚) is traditionally held to be a Shang dynasty King of China but recent archaeological evidence has thrown this into doubt.

In the Records of the Grand Historian he was listed by Sima Qian as the fifth Shang king, succeeding his father Tai Jia. He was enthroned in the year of Guisi (癸巳) with Qingshi (卿士) as his prime minister and Bo (亳) as his capital. In the 8th year of his reign, he conducted ceremonies to honour Yi Yin, the previous prime minister. He ruled for 19 years (other sources say 29 years) before his death. He was given the posthumous name Wo Ding and was succeeded by his brother Tai Geng. Oracle script inscriptions on bones unearthed at Yinxu do not list him as one of the Shang kings.

Wo Ding Shang dynasty
Regnal titles
Preceded by Tai Jia	King of China	Succeeded by Tai Geng
