= Shang dynasty =

Chinese dynasty (c. 1600 – c. 1046 BC)

Shang 商
- c. 1600 – c. 1046 BC
- Approximate extent of Shang territory within present-day China
- Capital: Bo (亳) (either modern Yanshi or Zhengzhou); Ao (隞) (near modern Zhengzhou); Yan (奄) (near modern Qufu); Xiang (near modern Anyang); Yin (near modern Anyang); Zhaoge (near modern Qi County, Hebi)
- Common languages: Old Chinese
- Religion: Shang state religion
- Government: Monarchy
- King
  - c. 1600 BC: Tai Yi
  - c. 1250 – 1191 BC: Wu Ding
  - c. 1075 – 1046 BC: Di Xin
- Historical era: Bronze Age
  - Established: c. 1600 BC
  - Battle of Muye: c. 1046 BC

Area
- c. 1122 BC: 1,250,000 km^{2} (480,000 sq mi)
- Currency: Shell money; Shell mussels; Tong Bei
Preceded by	Succeeded by
Xia dynasty; Predynastic Shang	Zhou dynasty

Shang
- "Shang" in oracle bone script (top left), bronze script (top right), seal script (bottom left), and regular script (bottom right) forms
- Chinese: 商
- Hanyu Pinyin: Shāng
Transcriptions
Standard Mandarin
- Hanyu Pinyin: Shāng
- Bopomofo: ㄕㄤ
- Wade–Giles: Shang^{1}
- Tongyong Pinyin: Shang
- IPA: [ʂáŋ]
Wu
- Romanization: Saon
Yue: Cantonese
- Yale Romanization: Sēung
- Jyutping: Soeng1
- IPA: [sœŋ˥]
Southern Min
- Hokkien POJ: Siong
- Tâi-lô: Siong
Old Chinese
- Baxter (1992): *hljang
- Baxter–Sagart (2014): *s-taŋ

Alternative Chinese name
- Chinese: 殷
- Hanyu Pinyin: Yīn
Transcriptions
Standard Mandarin
- Hanyu Pinyin: Yīn
- Bopomofo: ㄧㄣ
- Wade–Giles: Yin^{1}
- Tongyong Pinyin: Yin
- IPA: [ín]
Wu
- Romanization: In
Yue: Cantonese
- Yale Romanization: Yān
- Jyutping: Jan1
- IPA: [jɐn˥]
Southern Min
- Hokkien POJ: Ûn
- Tâi-lô: Ûn
Old Chinese
- Baxter–Sagart (2014): *ʔər

The Shang dynasty (Chinese: 商朝; pinyin: Shāngcháo), also known as the Yin dynasty (殷代; Yīn dài), was a Chinese royal dynasty that ruled in the Yellow River valley during the 2nd millennium BC, traditionally succeeding the Xia dynasty and followed by the Western Zhou dynasty. The classic account of the Shang comes from texts such as the Book of Documents, Bamboo Annals and Shiji. Modern scholarship dates the dynasty between the 16th and 11th centuries BC, with more agreement surrounding the end date than beginning date.

The Shang dynasty is the earliest dynasty within traditional Chinese history that is firmly supported by archaeological evidence. The archaeological site of Yinxu, near modern-day Anyang, corresponds to the final Shang capital of Yin. Excavations at Yinxu have revealed eleven major royal tombs, the foundations of former palace buildings, and the remains of both animals and humans that were sacrificed in official state rituals.

Tens of thousands of bronze, jade, stone, bone, and ceramic artefacts have been uncovered at Yinxu. Most prominently, the site has yielded the earliest known examples of Chinese writing—a corpus primarily consisting of divination texts inscribed on oracle bones, which were usually either turtle shells or ox scapulae. More than 20,000 oracle bones were discovered during the initial scientific excavations during the 1920s and 1930s, with over four times as many having been found since. The inscriptions provide critical insight into many topics from the politics, economy, and religious practices to the art and medicine of the early stages of Chinese history.

== Traditional accounts ==
Several of the Chinese classics discuss the history of the Shang, including the Book of Documents, the Mencius and the Zuo Zhuan. From the sources available to him, the Han dynasty historian Sima Qian assembled a chronological account of the Shang as part of the Shiji (c. 91 BC) official history. Sima describes some Shang-era events in detail, while others are only mentioned as taking place during the reign of a particular king. A slightly different account of the Shang is given in the Bamboo Annals, a text whose history is complex: while originally interred in 296 BC, the authenticity of the manuscripts that have survived is controversial.

Throughout history, the Shang have also been referred to as "Yin" (殷). The Shiji and the Bamboo Annals each use this name for both the dynasty, as well as its final capital. Since Huangfu Mi's Records of Emperors and Kings in the 3rd century AD, "Yin" has been frequently used to refer specifically to the latter half of the Shang. It is also the name predominantly used for the dynasty in Japan, Korea, and Vietnam, being rendered as In, Eun and Ân in Japanese, Korean, and Vietnamese respectively. The name seems to have originated during the subsequent Zhou dynasty; it does not appear in oracle bone inscriptions—which refer to the state as "Shang" (商), and to its capital as "Great Settlement of Shang" (大邑商; Dàyì Shāng)—nor does it appear in any bronze inscriptions securely dated to the Western Zhou (c. 1046 – 771 BC).

=== Founding myth ===
The founding myth of the Shang is described by Sima Qian in the Annals of the Yin. In the text, a woman named Jiandi, who was the second wife of Emperor Ku, swallowed an egg dropped by a black bird and subsequently gave birth miraculously to Xie. Xie is said to have helped Yu the Great to control the great flood and for his service to have been granted a place called Shang as a fief. The period before the Shang dynasty was established is known as the "Predynastic Shang" (or "Proto-Shang").

=== Dynastic course ===
In the Annals of the Yin, Sima Qian writes that the dynasty was founded 13 generations after Xie, when Xie's descendant, Tang, overthrew Jie, the impious and cruel final Xia ruler in the Battle of Mingtiao. The Records of the Grand Historian recount events from the reigns of Tang, Tai Jia, Tai Wu, Pan Geng, Wu Ding, Wu Yi and the depraved final king Di Xin, but the rest of the Shang rulers are merely mentioned by name. In the last century, Wang Guowei demonstrated that the succession to the Shang throne matched the list of kings in Sima Qian's Records of the Grand Historian. According to the Records of the Grand Historian, the Shang moved their capital five times, with the final move to Yin in the reign of Pan Geng inaugurating the golden age of the dynasty.

Di Xin, the last Shang king, is said to have committed suicide after his army was defeated by Wu of Zhou. Legends say that his army and his equipped slaves betrayed him by joining the Zhou rebels in the decisive Battle of Muye. According to the Yi Zhou Shu and Mencius the battle was very bloody. The classic Ming dynasty novel Investiture of the Gods retells the story of the war between Shang and Zhou as a conflict with rival factions of gods supporting different sides in the war.

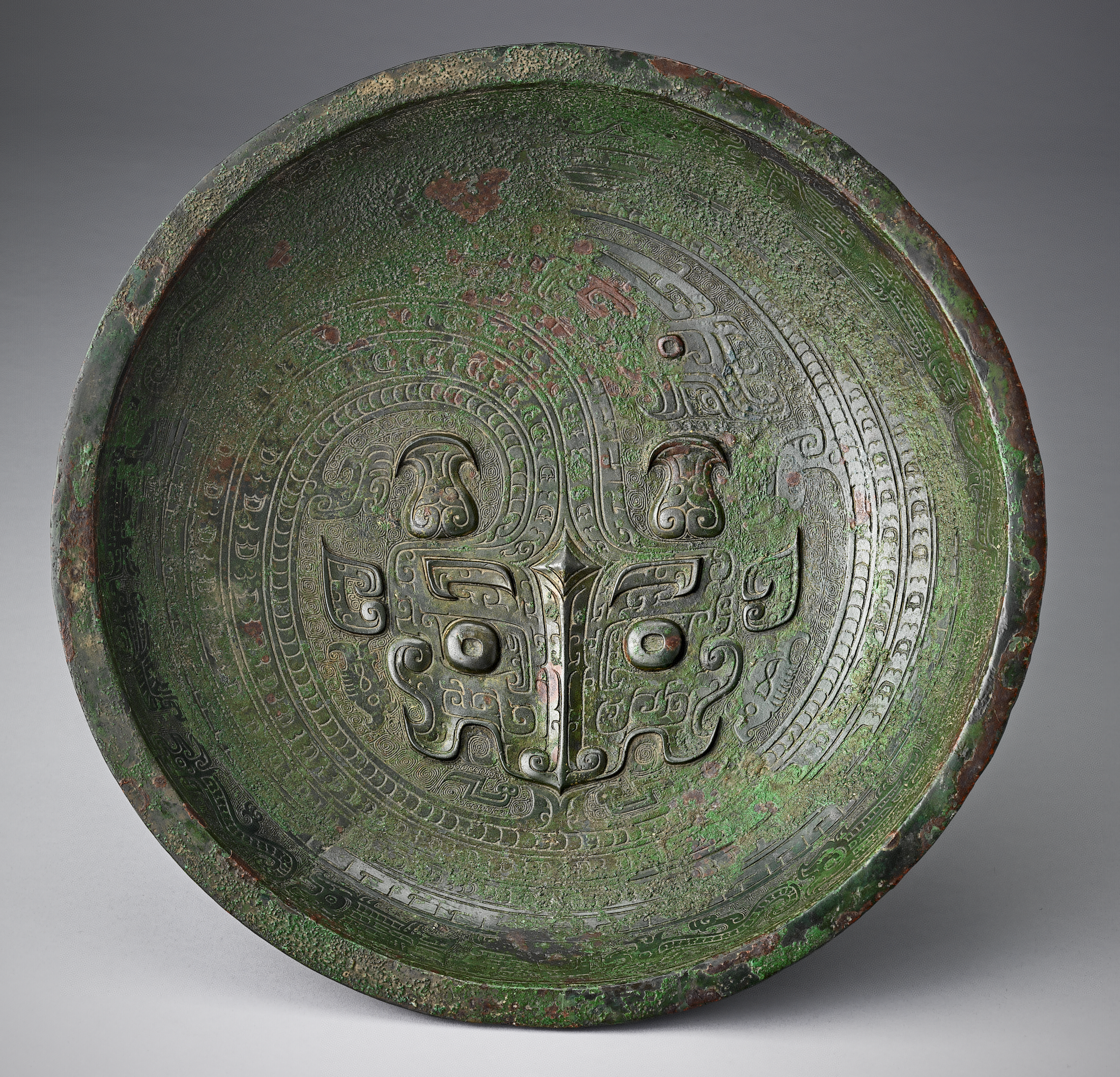
Bronze water vessel with coiling dragon and taotie pattern, late Shang (c. 1300–1050 BC)

After the Shang were defeated, King Wu allowed Di Xin's son Wu Geng to rule the Shang as a vassal kingdom. However, Zhou Wu sent three of his brothers and an army to ensure that Wu Geng would not rebel. After Zhou Wu's death, the Shang joined the Rebellion of the Three Guards against the Duke of Zhou, but the rebellion collapsed after three years, leaving Zhou in control of Shang territory.

=== Descendants of the Shang royal family ===
After the collapse of the Shang dynasty, Zhou's rulers forcibly relocated "Yin diehards" and scattered them throughout Zhou territory. Some surviving members of the Shang royal family collectively changed their surname from the ancestral name Zi to the name of their fallen dynasty, Yin. The family retained an aristocratic standing and often provided needed administrative services to the succeeding Zhou dynasty. King Wu of Zhou ennobled Lin Jian (林堅), the son of Prince Bigan, as the Duke of Bo'ling. The Shiji states that King Cheng of Zhou, with the support of his regent and uncle, the Duke of Zhou, enfeoffed Weiziqi (微子啟), a brother of Di Xin, as the Duke of Song, with its capital at Shangqiu. This practice was known as "enfeoffment of three generations for two kings". The dukes of Song would maintain rites honouring the Shang kings until Qi conquered Song in 286 BC. Confucius was possibly a descendant of the Shang Kings through the Dukes of Song.

The Eastern Han dynasty bestowed the title of Duke of Song and 'Duke Who Continues and Honours the Yin' upon Kong An, because he was part of the legacy of the Shang. This branch of the Confucius family is a separate branch from the line that held the title of Marquis of Fengsheng village and later Duke Yansheng.

Another remnant of the Shang established the vassal state of Guzhu (present-day Tangshan), which Duke Huan of Qi destroyed. Many Shang clans that migrated northeast after the dynasty's collapse were integrated into Yan culture during the Western Zhou period. These clans maintained an elite status and continued practising the sacrificial and burial traditions of the Shang.

Both Korean and Chinese legends, including reports in the Book of Documents and Bamboo Annals, state that a disgruntled Shang prince named Jizi, who had refused to cede power to the Zhou, left China with a small army. According to these legends, he founded a state known as Gija Joseon in northwest Korea during the Gojoseon period of ancient Korean history. However, scholars debate the historical accuracy of these legends.

== Early Bronze Age archaeology ==
Major archaeological sites of the second millennium BC in north and central China

Before the 20th century, the Zhou dynasty (1046–256 BC) was the earliest that could be verified from its own records. However, during the Song dynasty (960–1279), antiquarians collected bronze ritual vessels attributed to the Shang era, some of which bore inscriptions.

=== Yellow River valley ===
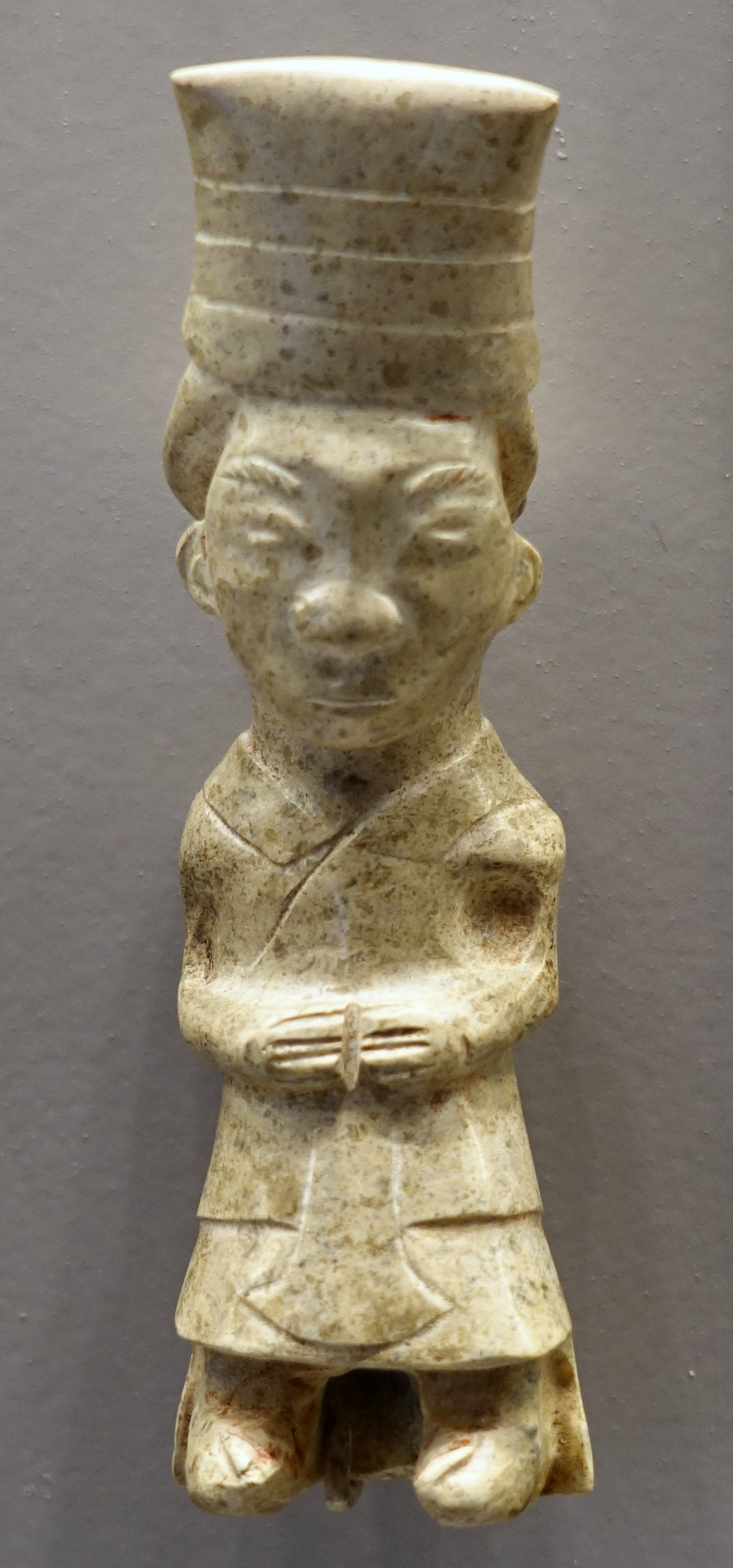
Shang nephrite statuette depicting a standing dignitary, dating between the 12th and 11th centuries BC, housed at the Arthur M. Sackler Museum at Harvard University

In 1899, several scholars noticed that Chinese pharmacists were selling "dragon bones" marked with curious and archaic characters. These were finally traced back in 1928 to what is now called Yinxu, north of the Yellow River near Anyang, where the Academia Sinica undertook archaeological excavation until the Second Sino-Japanese War in 1937. Archaeologists focused on the Yellow River valley in Henan as the most likely site of the states described in the traditional histories.

After 1950, the remnants of the earlier walled settlement of Zhengzhou Shang City were discovered within the modern city of Zhengzhou. It has been determined that the earth walls at Zhengzhou, erected in the 15th century BC, would have been 20 m (66 ft) wide at the base, rising to a height of 8 m (26 ft), and formed a roughly rectangular wall 7 km (4 mi) around the ancient city. The rammed earth construction of these walls was an inherited tradition, since much older fortifications of this type have been found at Chinese Neolithic sites of the Longshan culture (c. 3000 – c. 2000 BC). In 2022, excavation of an elite tomb inside the city walls yielded over 200 artefacts, including a gold face covering measuring 18.3 by 14.5 cm (7.2 by 5.7 in).

In 1959, the site of the Erlitou culture was found in Yanshi, south of the Yellow River near Luoyang. Radiocarbon dating suggests that the Erlitou culture flourished c. 2100 BC to 1800 BC. They built large palaces, suggesting the existence of an organised state. In 1983, Yanshi Shang City was discovered 6 km (3.7 mi) north-east of the Erlitou site in Yanshi's Shixianggou Township. This was a large walled city dating from 1600 BC. It had an area of nearly 200 ha (490 acres) and featured pottery characteristic of the Erligang culture.

The remains of a walled city of about 470 ha (1,200 acres) were discovered in 1999 across the Huan River from the well explored Yinxu site. The city, now known as Huanbei, was apparently occupied for less than a century and destroyed shortly before the construction of the Yinxu complex. Between 1989 and 2000, an important Shang settlement was excavated near Xiaoshuangqiao, about 20 km (12 mi) northwest of Zhengzhou. Covering an intermediary period between the Zhengzhou site and the late capitals on the Huan River, it features most prominently sacrificial pits with articulated skeletons of cattle, a quintessential part of the late Shang ritual complex.

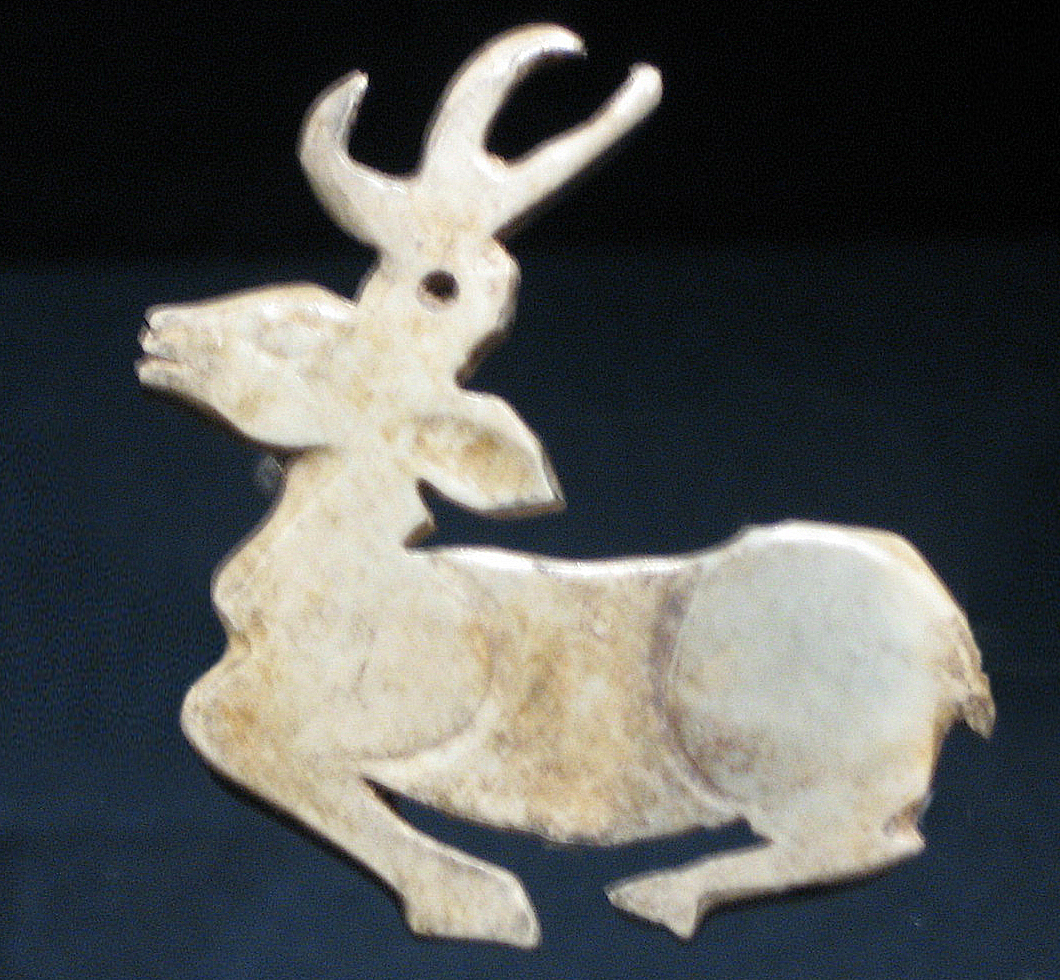
Jade deer dating to the Shang dynasty, in the collection of the Shanghai Museum

Chinese historians were accustomed to the notion of one dynasty succeeding another, and readily identified the Erligang and Erlitou sites with the early Shang and Xia dynasty of traditional histories. The actual political situation in early China may have been more complicated, with the Xia and Shang being political entities that existed concurrently, just as the early Zhou, who established the successor state of the Shang, are known to have existed at the same time as the Shang. It has also been suggested the Xia legend originated as a Shang myth of an earlier people who were their opposites.

=== Other sites ===
The Erligang culture centred on the Zhengzhou site is found across a wide area of China, even as far northeast as the area of modern Beijing. At least one burial in this region during this period contained both Erligang-style bronze utensils and local-style gold jewellery. The discovery of a Chenggu-style dagger-axe at Xiaohenan demonstrates that even at this early stage of Chinese history, there were some ties between the distant areas of north China. The Panlongcheng site in the middle Yangtze valley was an important regional centre of the Erligang culture.

Accidental finds elsewhere in China have revealed advanced civilisations contemporaneous with but culturally unlike the settlement at Anyang, such as the walled city of Sanxingdui in Sichuan. Western scholars are hesitant to designate such settlements as belonging to the Shang. Also unlike the Shang, there is no known evidence that the Sanxingdui culture had a system of writing. The late Shang state at Anyang is thus generally considered the first verifiable civilisation in Chinese history.

In contrast, the earliest layers of the Wucheng culture predating Anyang have yielded pottery fragments containing short sequences of symbols, suggesting that they may be a form of writing quite different in form from oracle bone characters, but the sample is too small for decipherment.

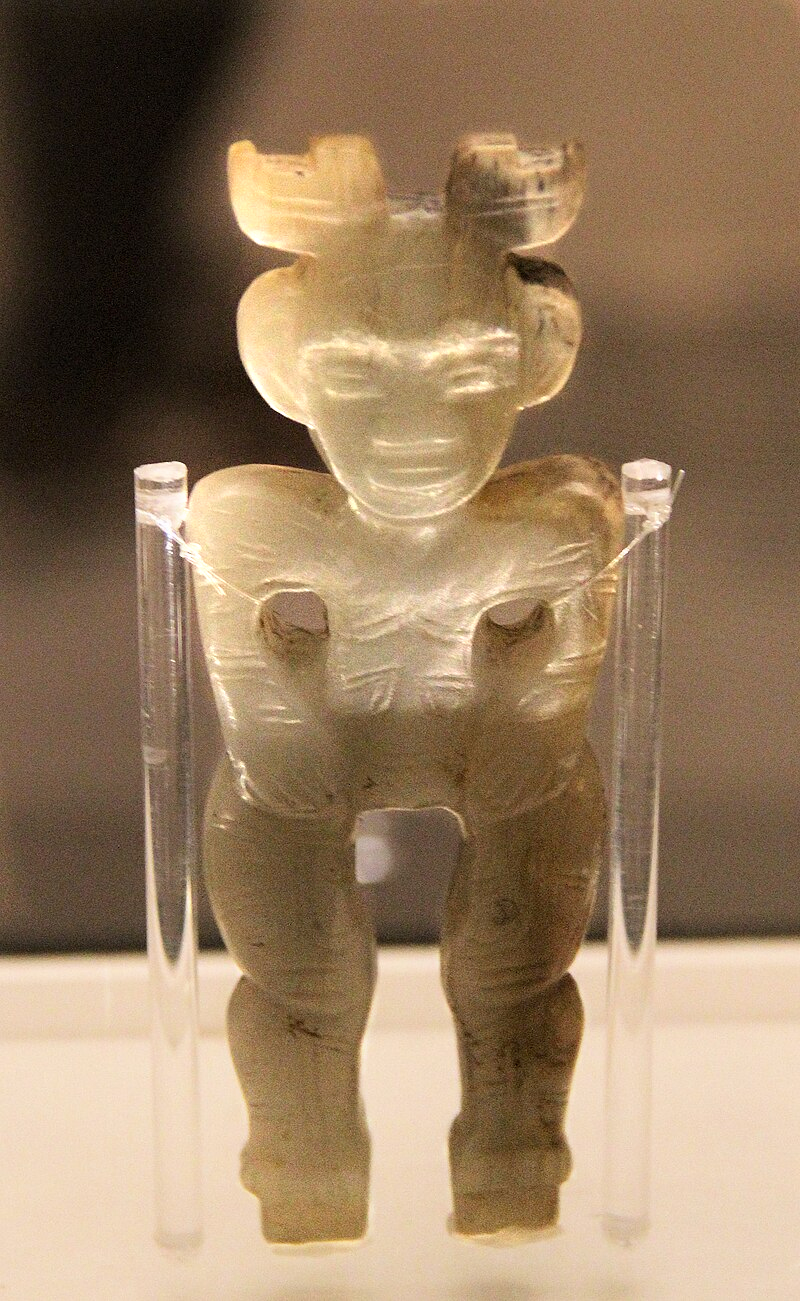
Shang jade human figure, tomb of Fu Hao (died c. 1200 BC). Probably derived from a design of the Seima-Turbino culture.

== Absolute chronology ==
The earliest securely dated event in Chinese history is the start of the Gonghe Regency in 841 BC, early in the Zhou dynasty, a date first established by Sima Qian. Attempts to establish earlier dates have been plagued by doubts about the origin and transmission of traditional texts and the difficulties in their interpretation. More recent attempts have compared the traditional histories with archaeological and astronomical data. At least 44 dates for the end of the dynasty have been proposed, ranging from 1130 to 1018 BC.

- The traditional dates of the dynasty, from 1766 to 1122 BC, were calculated by Liu Xin during the Han dynasty.
- A calculation based on the "old text" of the Bamboo Annals yields dates of 1523 to 1027 BC.
- David Pankenier, by attempting to identify astronomical events mentioned in Zhou texts, dated the beginning of the dynasty at 1554 BC and its overthrow at 1046 BC.
- The Xia–Shang–Zhou Chronology Project identified the establishment of the dynasty with the foundation of an Erligang culture walled city at Yanshi, dated c. 1600 BC. The project also arrived at an end date of 1046 BC, based on a combination of the astronomical evidence considered by David Pankenier and radiocarbon dating of archaeological layers.
- David Nivison and Edward Shaughnessy argue for an end date of 1045 BC, based on their analysis of the Bamboo Annals.
- Radiocarbon dating of oracle bones has yielded an end date of 1041 BC, with an uncertainty of about 10 years.

== Late Shang at Anyang ==
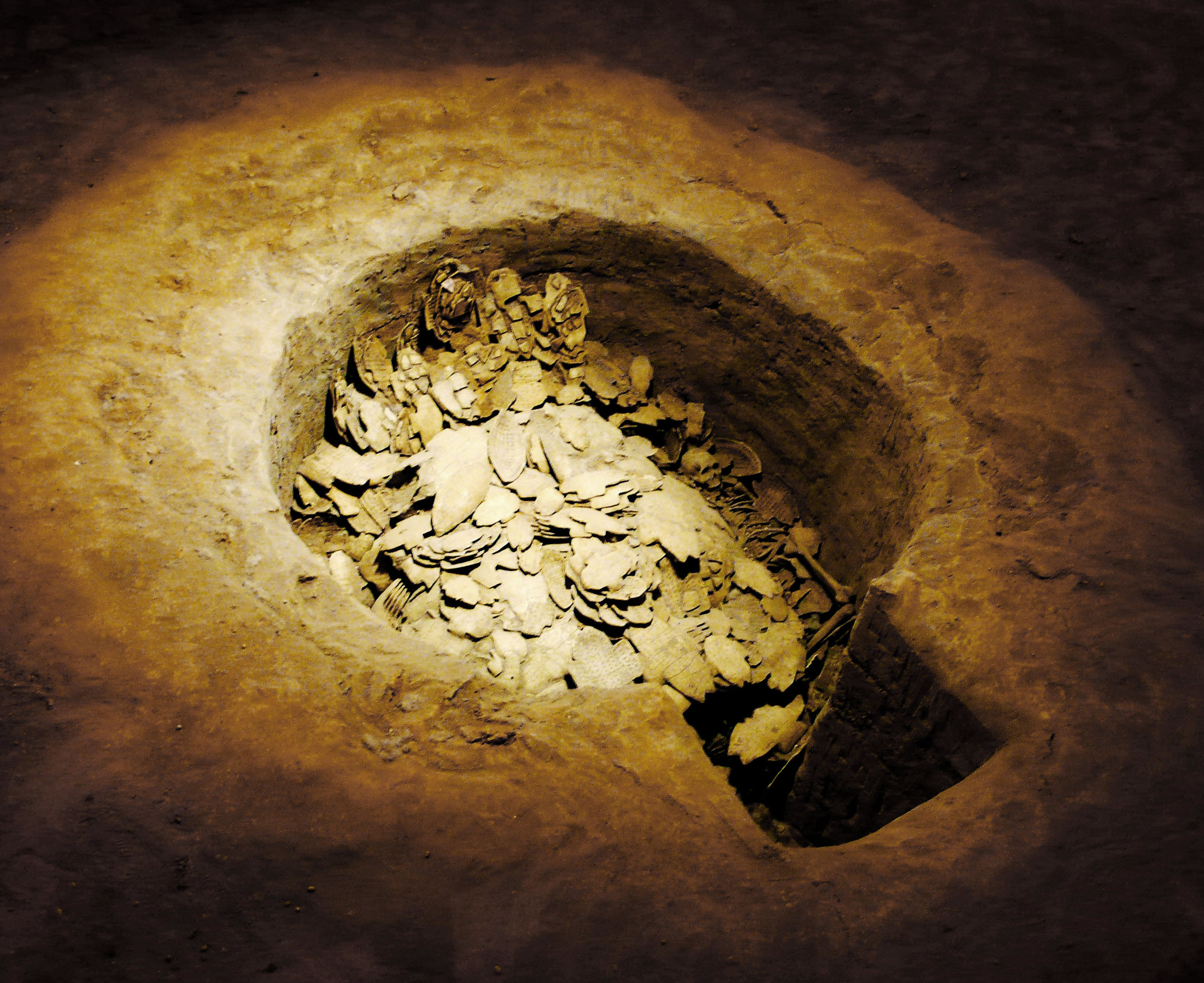
A pit at Yinxu containing oracle bones ceremonially buried after divination

The oldest extant direct records date from c. 1250 BC at the Yinxu site near Anyang, covering the reigns of the last nine Shang kings. The Shang had a fully developed system of writing, preserved on bronze inscriptions and a small number of other writings on pottery, jade and other stones, horn, etc., but most prolifically on oracle bones. The complexity and sophistication of this writing system indicates an earlier period of development, but direct evidence of such is still lacking. Other advances included the invention of many musical instruments and celestial observations of Mars and various comets by Shang astronomers.

Their civilisation was based on agriculture and augmented by hunting and animal husbandry. In addition to war, the Shang practised human sacrifice. The majority of human sacrifice victims mentioned in Shang writings were war captives taken from the Qiang people, who lived to the northwest of the Shang. Using skeletal isotope analysis, a group of Shang sacrifice victims at the Zhengzhou site was also found to most likely have been war captives. Skulls of sacrificial victims have been found to be similar to modern Chinese ones (based on comparisons with remains from Hainan and Taiwan). Cowry shells were also excavated at Anyang, suggesting trade with coast-dwellers, but there was very limited sea trade since China was isolated from other large civilisations during the Shang period. Trade relations and diplomatic ties with other formidable powers via the Silk Road and Chinese voyages to the Indian Ocean did not exist until the reign of Emperor Wu during the Han dynasty (202 BC – 221 AD).

=== Court life ===
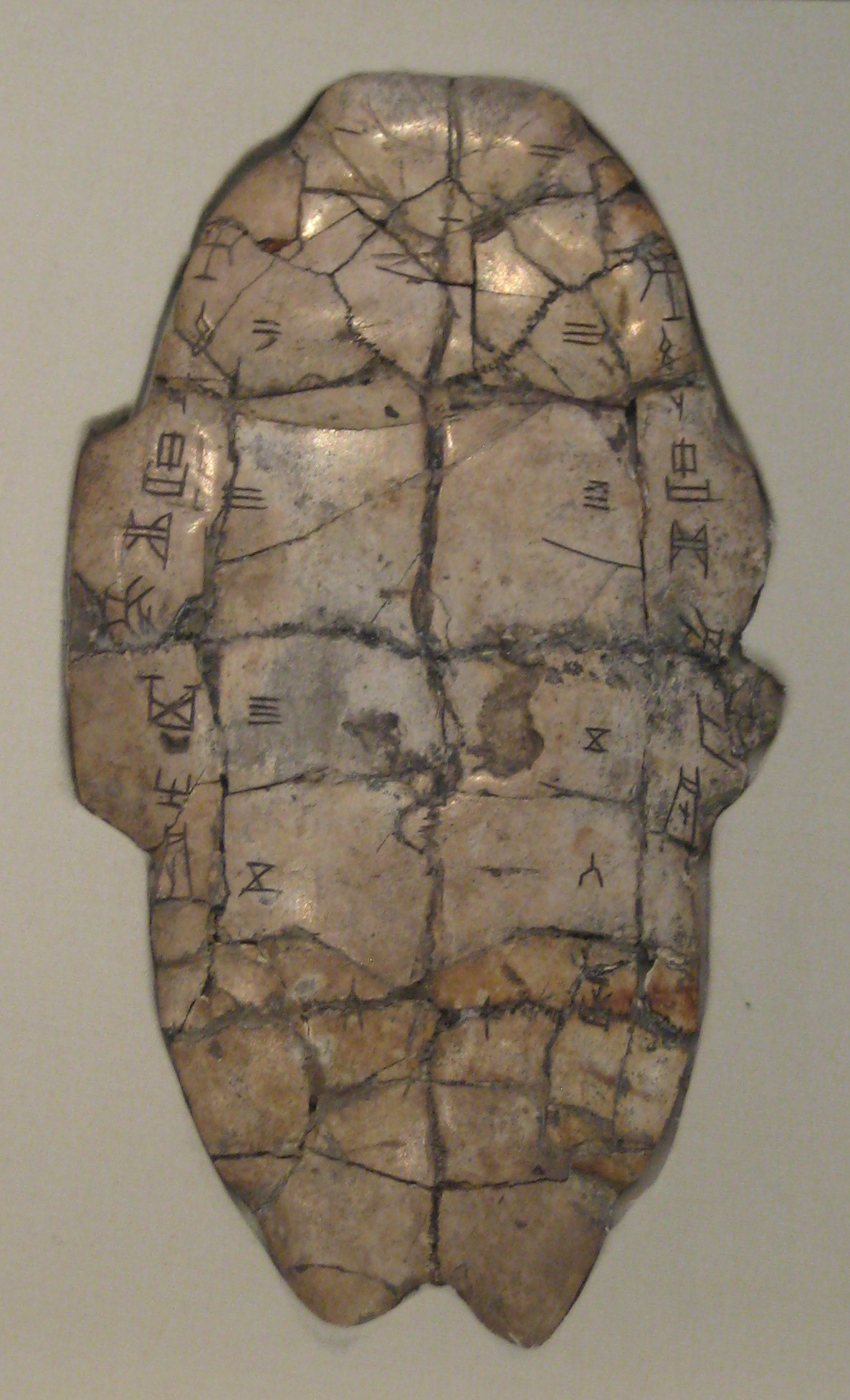
Tortoise shell with divinatory inscriptions

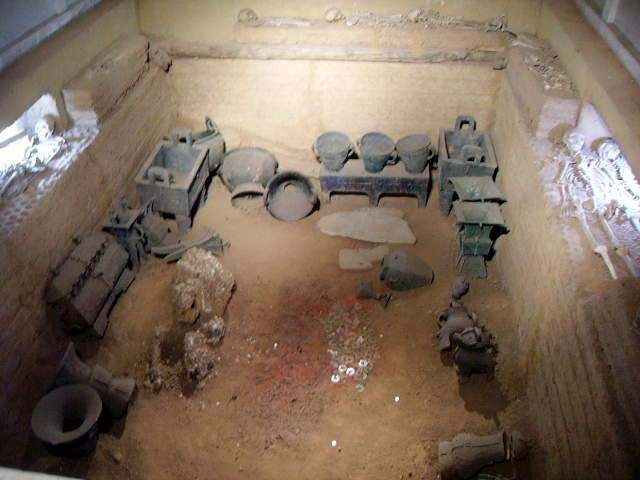
Bronzeware from the excavated tomb of Fu Hao

At the excavated royal palace in Yinxu, large stone pillar bases were found along with rammed earth foundations and platforms, which according to Fairbank, were "as hard as cement". These foundations in turn originally supported 53 buildings of wooden post-and-beam construction. In close proximity to the main palatial complex, there were underground pits used for storage, servants' quarters, and housing quarters.

Many Shang royal tombs had been tunnelled into and ravaged by grave robbers in ancient times, but in the spring of 1976, the discovery of Tomb 5 at Yinxu revealed a tomb that was not only undisturbed, but one of the most richly furnished Shang tombs that archaeologists had yet come across. With over 200 bronze ritual vessels and 109 inscriptions of Fu Hao's name, Zheng Zhenxiang and other archaeologists realised they had stumbled across the tomb of Fu Hao, Wu Ding's most famous consort also renowned as a military general, and mentioned in 170 to 180 oracle bone inscriptions. Along with bronze vessels, stoneware and pottery vessels, bronze weapons, jade figures and hair combs, and bone hairpins were found. The archaeological team argue that the large assortment of weapons and ritual vessels in her tomb correlate with the oracle bone accounts of her military and ritual activities.

The capital was the centre of court life. Over time, court rituals to appease spirits developed, and in addition to his secular duties, the king would serve as the head of the ancestor worship cult. Often, the king would even perform oracle bone divinations himself, especially near the end of the dynasty. Evidence from excavations of the royal tombs indicates that royalty were buried with articles of value, presumably for use in the afterlife. Perhaps for the same reason, hundreds of commoners, who may have been slaves, were buried alive with the royal corpse.

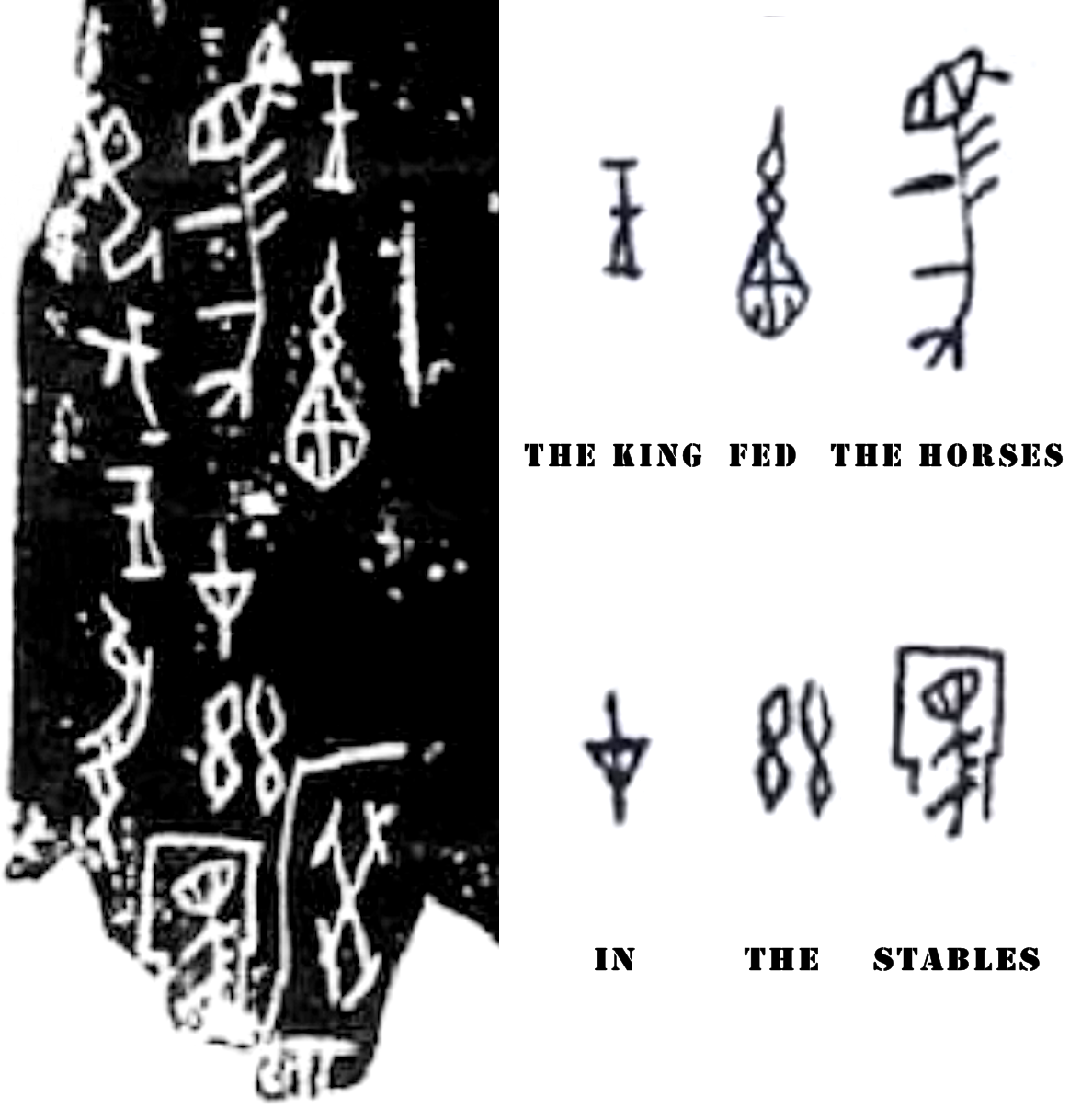
Late Shang oracle bone inscriptions about breeding horses.

A line of hereditary Shang kings ruled over much of northern China, and Shang troops fought frequent wars with neighbouring settlements and nomadic herdsmen from the inner Asian steppes. The Shang king, in his oracular divinations, repeatedly showed concern about the barbarians living outside of the civilised regions, which made up the centre of Shang territory. In particular, the group living in the Yan Mountains were regularly mentioned as hostile to the Shang.

Apart from their role as the head military commanders, Shang kings also asserted their social supremacy by acting as the high priests of society and leading the divination ceremonies. As the oracle bone texts reveal, the Shang kings were viewed as the best qualified members of society to offer sacrifices to their royal ancestors and to the high god Di, who in their beliefs was responsible for the rain, wind, and thunder.

The King appointed officials to manage certain activities, usually in a specified region. These included agricultural official, pastors, dog officers, and guards. These officers led their own retinues in the conduct of their duties, and some grew more independent and emerged as rulers of their own. There was a basic system of bureaucracy in place, with references to positions such as the "Many Dog officers", "Many horse officers", the "Many Artisans", the "Many Archers" or court titles like "Junior Servitor for Cultivation" or "Junior Servitor for labourers". Members of the royal family would be assigned personal estates; the king provided them with pre-determined public works such as walling cities in their regions, distributed materials and issued commands to them. In turn, their estates belonged ultimately to the king's land, and they paid tribute to the king as well as reporting to him about conquered lands. More distant rulers were known by titles translated as marquess or count, who sometimes provided tribute and support to the Shang King in exchange for military aid and augury services. However these alliances were unstable, as indicated by the frequent royal divinations about the sustainability of such relations.

The existence of records regarding enemy kills, prisoners and booty taken point to the existence of a proto-bureaucracy of written documents.

=== Religion ===
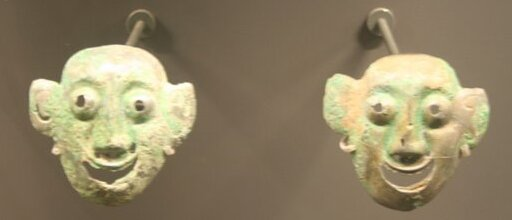
Shang-era face masks made of bronze, c. 16th–14th centuries BC

Shang religious rituals featured divination and sacrifice. The degree to which shamanism was a central aspect of Shang religion is a subject of debate.

There were six main recipients of sacrifice:

1. Di, the "High God",
2. Natural forces, such as that of the sun and mountains,
3. Former lords, deceased humans who had been added to the dynastic pantheon,
4. Pre-dynastic ancestors,
5. Dynastic ancestors, and
6. Royal wives who were ancestors of the present king.

The Shang believed that their ancestors held power over them and performed divination rituals to secure their approval for planned actions. Divination involved cracking a turtle carapace or ox scapula to answer a question, and to then record the response to that question on the bone itself. It is unknown what criteria the diviners used to determine the response, but it is believed to be the sound or pattern of the cracks on the bone.

The Shang also seem to have believed in an afterlife, as evidenced by the elaborate burial tombs built for deceased rulers. Often "carriages, utensils, sacrificial vessels, [and] weapons" would be included in the tomb. A king's burial involved the burial of up to a few hundred humans and horses as well to accompany the king into the afterlife, in some cases even numbering four hundred. Finally, tombs included ornaments such as jade, which the Shang may have believed to protect against decay or confer immortality.

The Shang religion was highly bureaucratic and meticulously ordered. Oracle bones contained descriptions of the date, ritual, person, ancestor, and questions associated with the divination. Tombs displayed highly ordered arrangements of bones, with groups of skeletons laid out facing the same direction.

=== Bronze working ===
Chinese bronze casting and pottery advanced during the Shang, with bronze typically being used for ritually significant, rather than primarily utilitarian, items. As early as c. 1500 BC, the early Shang dynasty engaged in large-scale production of bronzeware vessels and weapons. This production required a large labour force that could handle the mining, refining, and transportation of the necessary copper, tin, and lead ores. This in turn created a need for official managers that could oversee both labourers and skilled artisans and craftsmen. The Shang royal court and aristocrats required a vast number of different bronze vessels for various ceremonial purposes and events of religious divination. Ceremonial rules even decreed how many bronze containers of each type a noble of a certain rank could own. With the increased amount of bronze available, the army could also better equip itself with an assortment of bronze weaponry. Bronze was also used for the fittings of spoke-wheeled chariots, which appeared in China around 1200 BC.

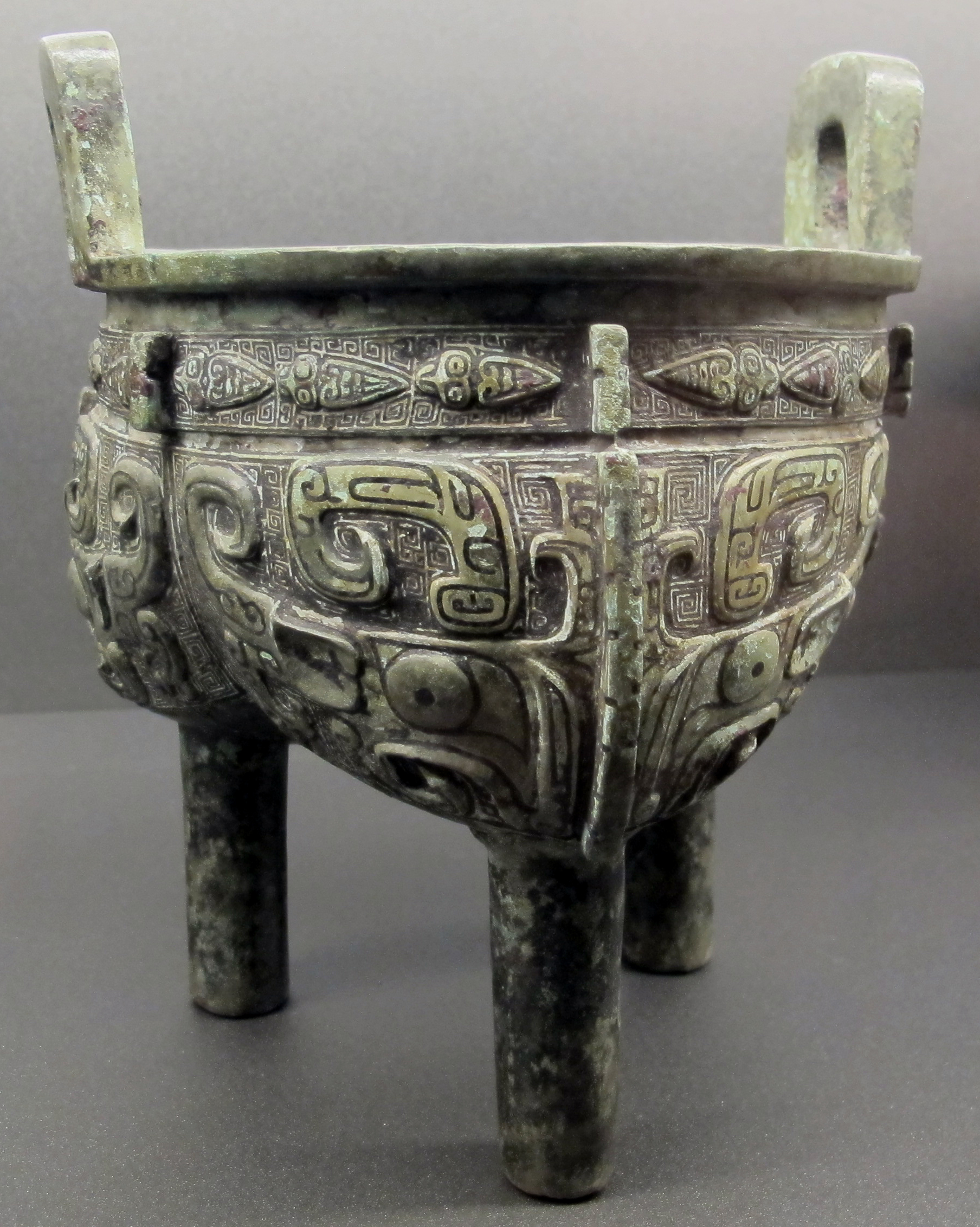
A ding dating from the Shang

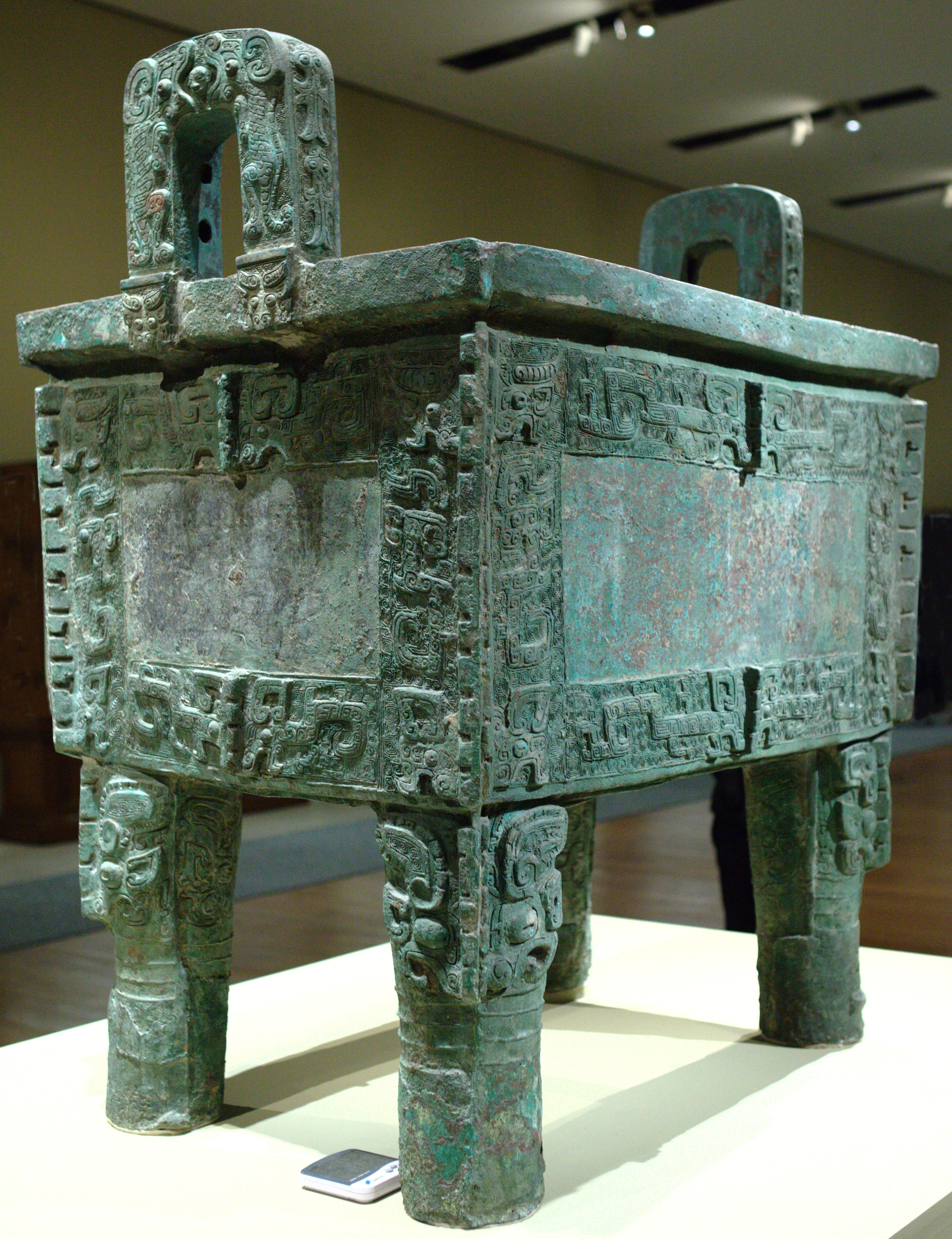
The Shang-era Houmuwu ding, the heaviest piece of bronze work found in China so far

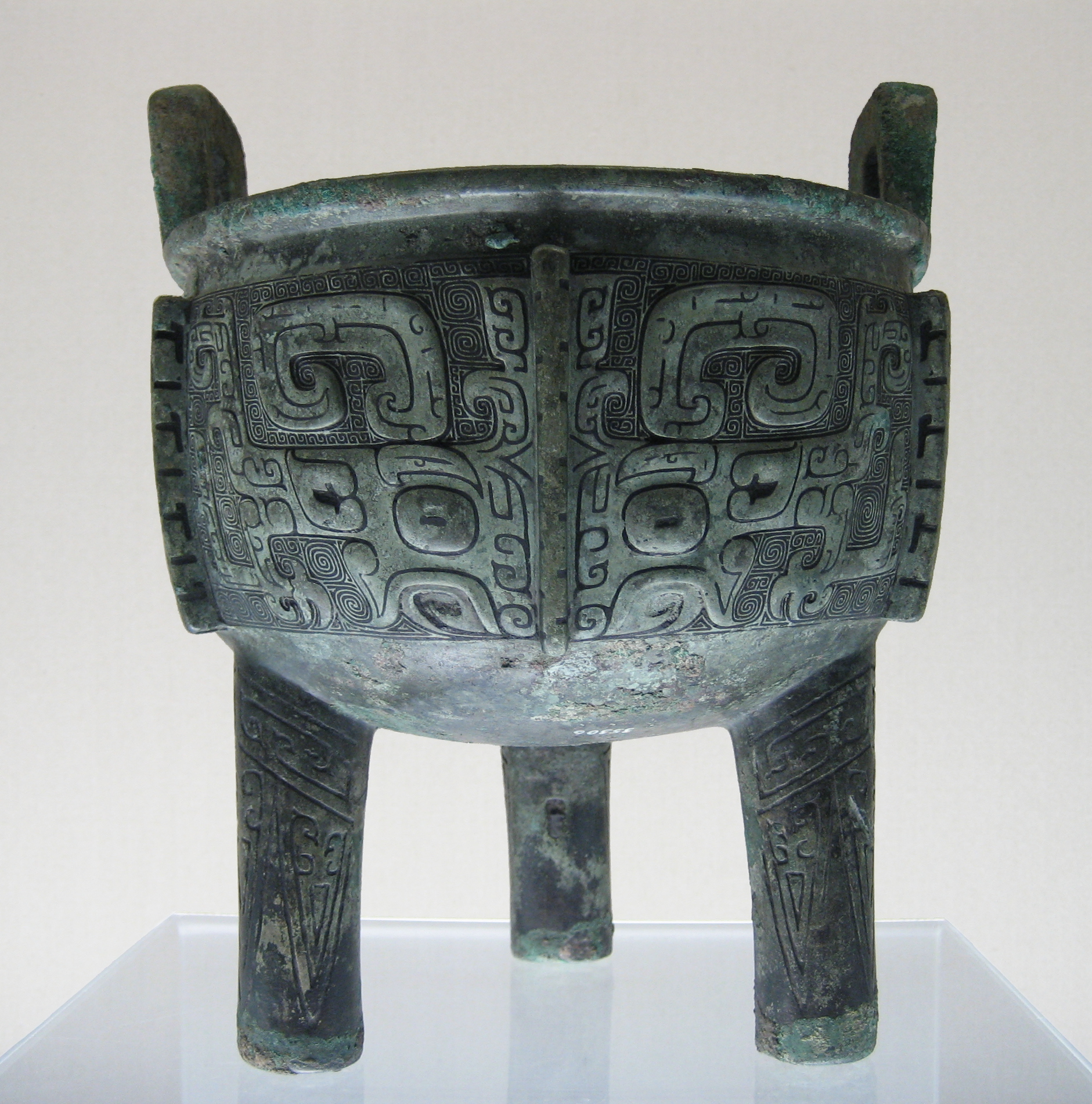
A late Shang-era ding with taotie motif

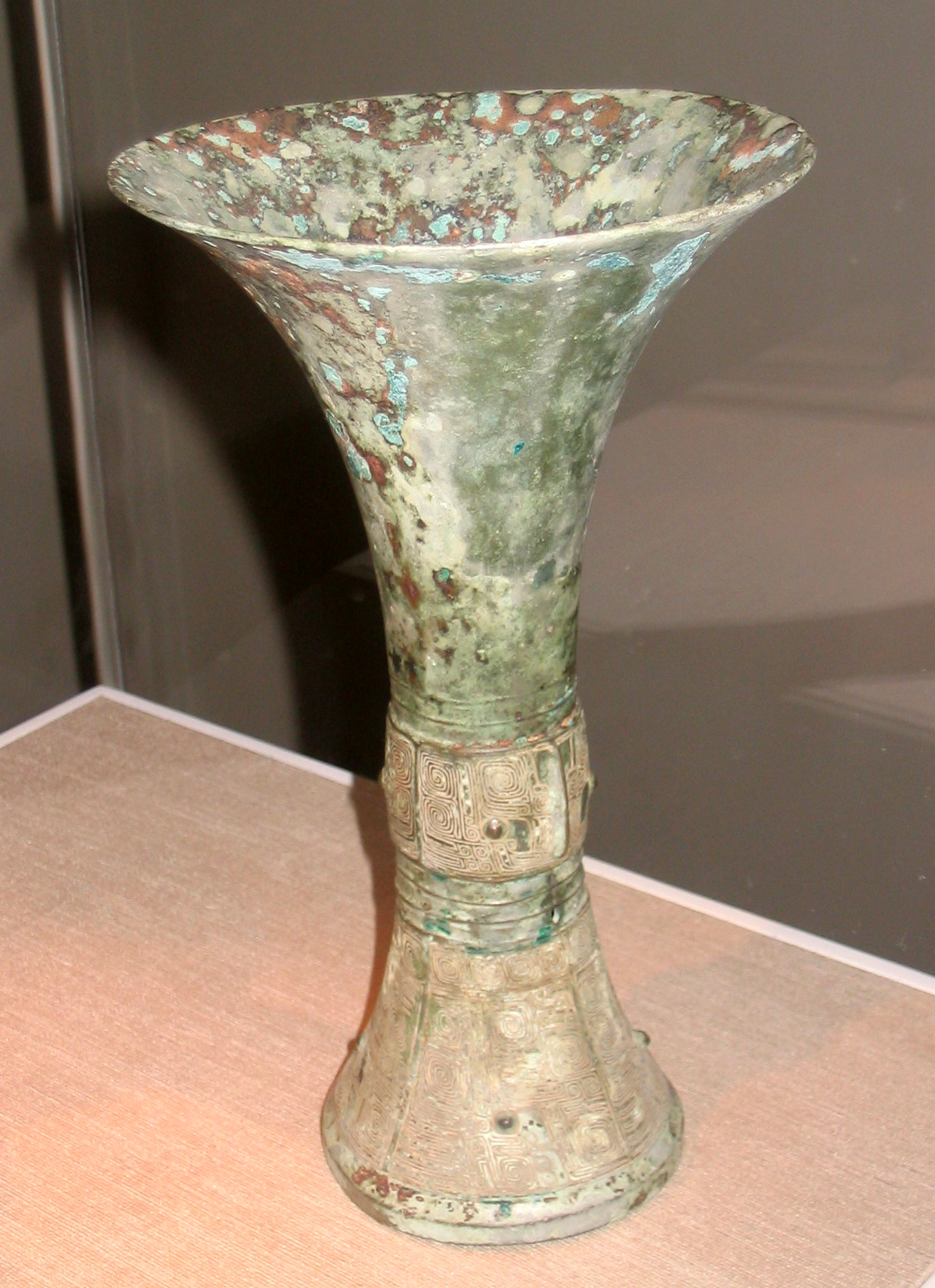
A gu ritual bronze vessel used to hold wine

=== Military ===
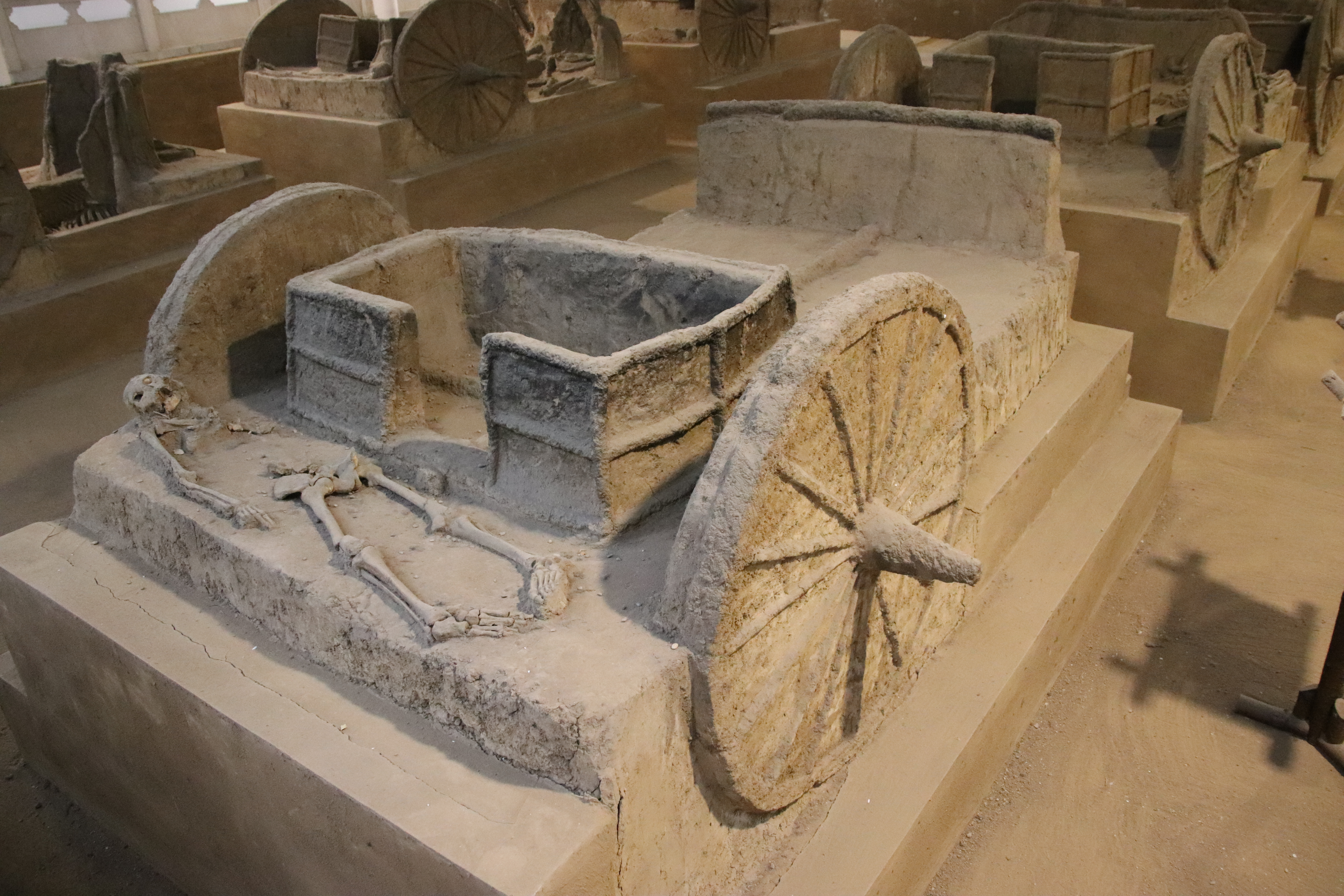
War chariots at Yinxu. Shang chariots were introduced c. 1200 BC through the northern steppes, probably from the area of the Karasuk culture, or deer stones culture.

The Shang dynasty entered into prolonged conflicts with northern frontier tribes called the Guifang.

Bronze weapons were an integral part of Shang society. Shang infantry were armed with a variety of stone and bronze weaponry, including spears, pole-axes, pole-based dagger-axes, composite bows, and bronze or leather helmets.

Although the Shang depended upon the military skills of their nobility, Shang rulers could mobilise the masses of town-dwelling and rural commoners as conscript labourers and soldiers for both campaigns of defence and conquest. Aristocrats and other state rulers were obligated to furnish their local garrisons with all necessary equipment, armour, and armaments. The Shang king maintained a force of about a thousand troops at his capital and would personally lead this force into battle. A rudimentary military bureaucracy was also needed in order to muster forces ranging from three to five thousand troops for border campaigns to thirteen thousand troops for suppressing rebellions.

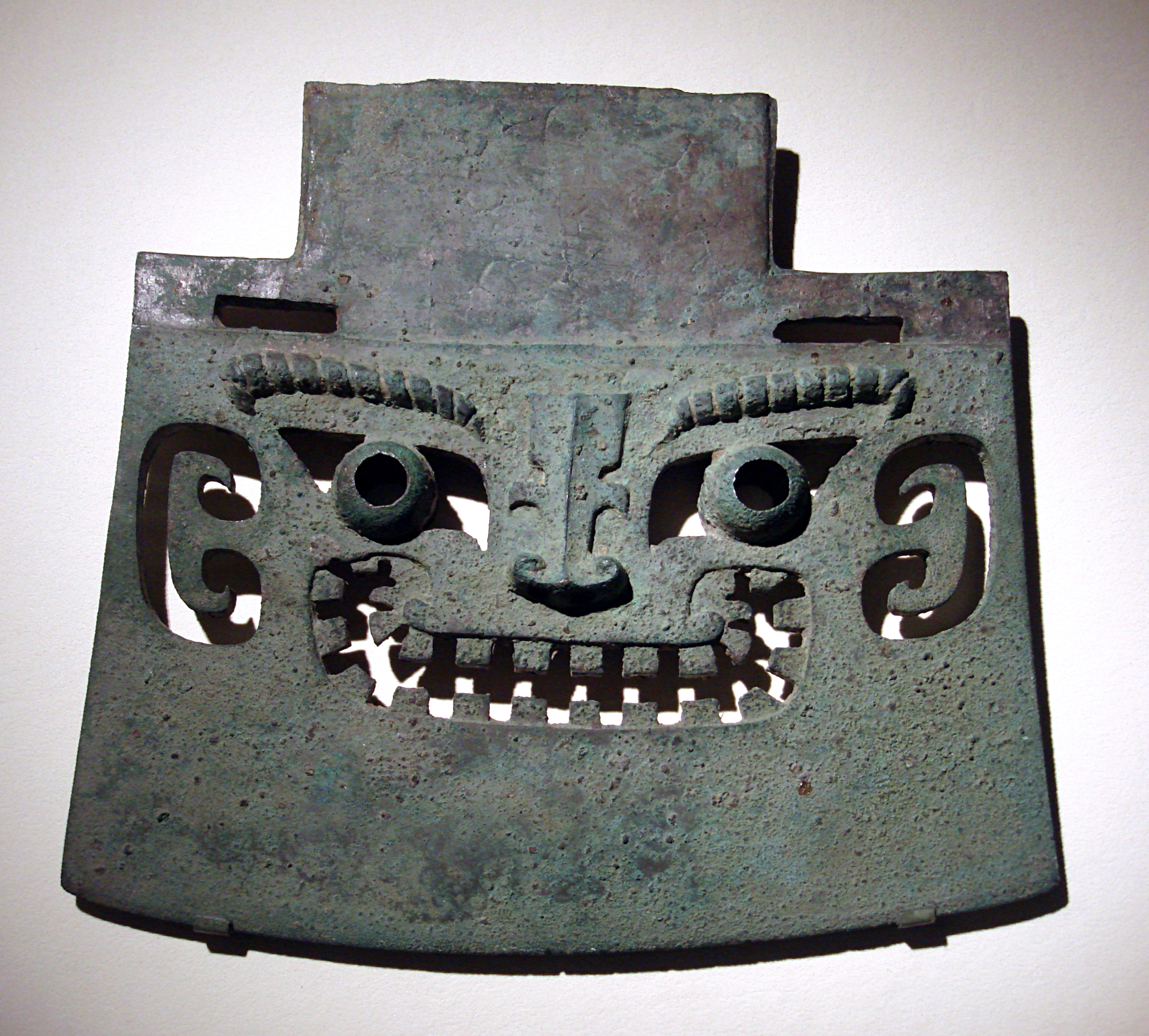
A yue bronze axe with head motif, dated to the Shang

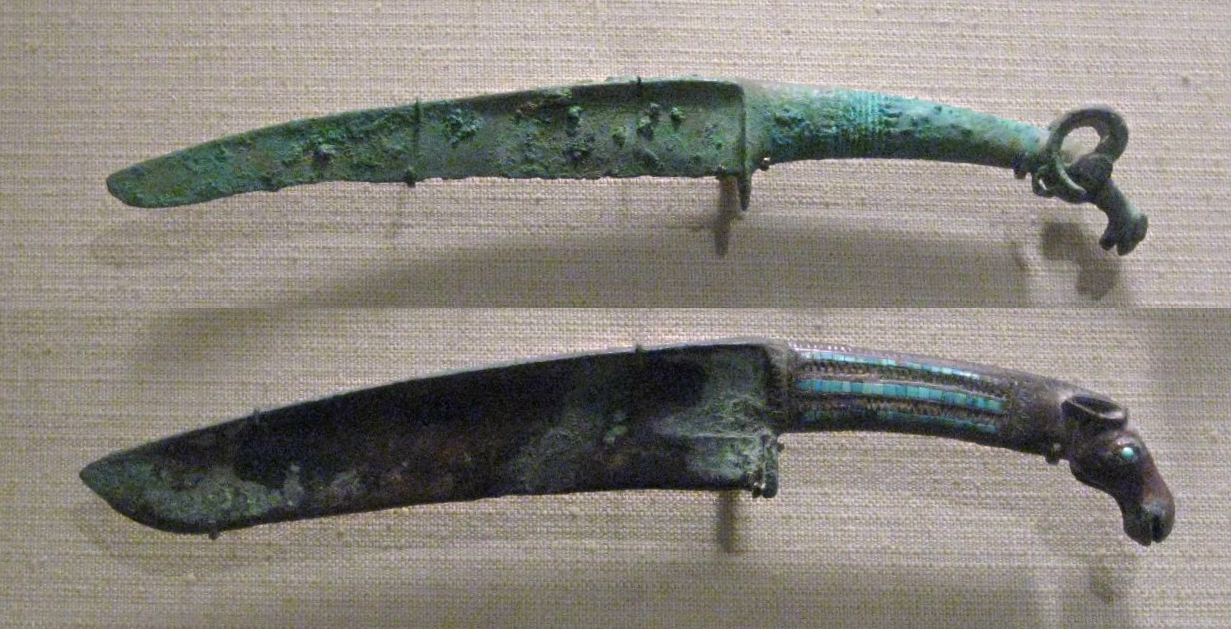
Shang dynasty curved bronze knives with turquoise inlays and animal pommel. 12th–11th centuries BC. Such knives may be the result of contacts with northern people.

== Kings ==
The earliest records are the oracle bones inscribed during the reigns of the Shang kings from Wu Ding. Oracle bone inscriptions do not contain king lists, but they do record the sacrifices to previous kings and the ancestors of the current king, which follow a standard schedule that scholars have reconstructed. From this evidence, scholars have assembled the implied king list and genealogy, finding that it is in substantial agreement with the later accounts, especially for later kings. According to this implied king list, Wu Ding was the twenty-first Shang king.

The Shang kings were referred to in the oracle bones by posthumous names. The last character of each name is one of the 10 celestial stems, which also denoted the day of the 10-day Shang week on which sacrifices would be offered to that ancestor within the ritual schedule. There were more kings than stems, so the names have distinguishing prefixes such as da ('greater', 大), zhong ('middle', 中), xiao ('lesser', 小), bu ('outer', 卜), and zu ('ancestor', 祖), as well as other, more obscure ones.

The kings, in the order of succession derived from the oracle bones, are here grouped by generation. Later reigns were assigned to oracle bone diviner groups by Dong Zuobin.

Generation	Older brothers			Main line of descent	Younger brothers	Divination phase
1				Da Yi (大乙) (Note: The first king is known as Tang in the Shiji. The oracle bones also identify six pre-dynastic ancestors: 上甲 Shang Jia, 報乙 Bao Yi, 報丙 Bao Bing, 報丁 Bao Ding, 示壬 Shi Ren and 示癸 Shi Gui.)		(Note: There is no firm evidence of oracle bone inscriptions before the reign of Wu Ding.)
2				Da Ding (大丁) (Note: According to the Shiji and the Mencius, Da Ding (there called Tai Ding) died before he could ascend to the throne. However in the oracle bones he receives rituals like any other king.)		(Note: There is no firm evidence of oracle bone inscriptions before the reign of Wu Ding.)
3				Da Jia (大甲)	Bu Bing (卜丙) (Note: According to the Shiji, Bu Bing (there called Wai Bing) and 仲壬 Zhong Ren (not mentioned in the oracle bones) were younger brothers of Dai Ting and preceded Da Jia (also known as Dai Jia). However the Mencius, the Zuo Zhuan and the Book of Documents state that he reigned after Da Jia, as also implied by the oracle bones.)	(Note: There is no firm evidence of oracle bone inscriptions before the reign of Wu Ding.)
4			(Note: The Shiji includes a king Wo Ding not mentioned in the oracle bones.)	Da Geng (大庚)	Xiao Jia (小甲) (Note: The Shiji has Xiao Jia as the son of Da Geng (known as Tai Geng) in the "Annals of Yin", but as a younger brother (as implied by the oracle bones) in the "Genealogical Table of the Three Ages".)	(Note: There is no firm evidence of oracle bone inscriptions before the reign of Wu Ding.)
5				Da Wu (大戊)	Lü Ji (呂己) (Note: According to the Historical Records, Lü Ji (there called Yong Ji) reigned before Da Wu (there called Tai Wu).)	(Note: There is no firm evidence of oracle bone inscriptions before the reign of Wu Ding.)
6				Zhong Ding (中丁) (Note: The kings from Zhong Ding to Nan Geng are placed in the same order by the Shiji and the oracle bones, but there are some differences in genealogy, as described in the articles on individual kings.)	Bu Ren (卜壬)	(Note: There is no firm evidence of oracle bone inscriptions before the reign of Wu Ding.)
7			Jian Jia (戔甲)	Zu Yi (祖乙)		(Note: There is no firm evidence of oracle bone inscriptions before the reign of Wu Ding.)
8				Zu Xin (祖辛)	Qiang Jia (羌甲) (Note: The status of Qiang Jia varies over the history of the oracle bones. During the reigns of Wu Ding, Di Yi and Di Xin, he was not included in the main line of descent, a position also held by the Shiji, but in the intervening reigns he was included as a direct ancestor.)	(Note: There is no firm evidence of oracle bone inscriptions before the reign of Wu Ding.)
9				Zu Ding (祖丁)	Nan Geng (南庚) (Note: According to the Historical Records, Nan Geng was the son of Qiang Jia (there called Wo Jia).)	(Note: There is no firm evidence of oracle bone inscriptions before the reign of Wu Ding.)
10	Xiang Jia (象甲)	Pan Geng (盤庚)	Xiao Xin (小辛)	Xiao Yi (小乙)		(Note: There is no firm evidence of oracle bone inscriptions before the reign of Wu Ding.)
11				Wu Ding (武丁)		1254–1197 BC (I)
12		(Note: The oracle bones and the Shiji include an older brother Zu Ji (祖己) who did not reign.)	Zu Geng (祖庚)	Zu Jia (祖甲)		1206–1177 BC (II)
13			Lin Xin (廩辛) (Note: Lin Xin is named as a king in the Shiji and oracle bones of succeeding reigns, but not those of the last two kings.)	Geng Ding (康丁)		1187–1135 BC (III)
14				Wu Yi (武乙)		1157–1110 BC (IV)
15				Wen Wu Ding (文武丁)		1157–1110 BC (IV)
16				Di Yi (帝乙) (Note: There are no ancestral sacrifices to the last two kings on the oracles bones, due to the fall of Shang, though scant few bronze inscriptions showing sacrifice to Di Yi do exist. Their names, including the character 帝; dì; 'emperor', appear more in the much later Bamboo Annals and Shiji.)		1121–1041 BC (V)
17				Di Xin (帝辛) (Note: also referred to as Zhòu (紂), Zhòu Xīn (紂辛) or Zhou Wang (紂王) or by adding "Shang" (商) in front of any of these names.)		1121–1041 BC (V)

== See also ==
- Chinese sovereign
- List of Shang dynasty states
- Historical capitals of China
- Predynastic Zhou
- Women in ancient and imperial China

== Notes ==
Preceded by Xia dynasty	Dynasties in Chinese history c. 1600 – c. 1046 BC	Succeeded by Zhou dynasty
