= Tang of Shang =

Founder and first king of the Shang dynasty

Tang 湯
- Depiction of King Tang by Ma Lin

King of the Shang dynasty
- Reign: c. 1600 BC - c. 1587 BC
- Predecessor: Position established Shi Gui of Predynastic Shang; Jie of Xia
- Successor: Bu Bing; Da Ding

Leader of the Predynastic Shang
- Reign: ? - c. 1600 BC
- Predecessor: Shi Gui
- Successor: Position abolished
- Born: c. 1670 B.C. Predynastic Shang
- Died: c. 1587 B.C. Bo (亳, modern-day Shangqiu, Henan)
- Spouse: Bi Jia (妣甲); Bi Bing (妣丙)
- Issue: Da Ding, Bu Bing
Names
- Family name: Zi (子); Given name: Lü (履); Posthumous name: Cheng Tang (成湯)
Temple name
- Taizu (太祖), Tai Yi (太乙), or Da Yi (大乙)
- Military career
- Allegiance: Predynastic Shang
- Conflicts: Battle of Mingtiao

Cheng Tang
- Traditional Chinese: 成湯
- Simplified Chinese: 成汤
Transcriptions
Standard Mandarin
- Hanyu Pinyin: Chéng Tāng
- Wade–Giles: Chʻêng^{2} T'ang^{1}
- IPA: [ʈʂʰə̌ŋtʰáŋ]
Wu
- Romanization: Zen^{2} Thaon^{1}
Yue: Cantonese
- Jyutping: Sing^{4} Tong^{1}
- IPA: [sɪŋ˩tʰɔŋ˥]
Southern Min
- Tâi-lô: Tshiânn Thng/Thong
Middle Chinese
- Middle Chinese: Dzyeng Thang
Old Chinese
- Baxter–Sagart (2014): [d]eŋ r̥ˤaŋ
- Zhengzhang: /*djeŋ l̥ʰaːŋ/

Temple name
- Chinese: 太乙 大乙
Transcriptions
Standard Mandarin
- Hanyu Pinyin: Tài Yǐ; Dà Yǐ
- IPA: [tʰâɪ ì] [tâ ì]
Wu
- Romanization: tha^{5} iq^{7} du^{6} iq^{7}
Yue: Cantonese
- Jyutping: taai^{3} jyut^{3} daai^{6} jyut^{3}
- IPA: [tʰaj˧ jyt̚˧] [taj˨ jyt̚˧]
Middle Chinese
- Middle Chinese: thajH 'it dajH 'it
Old Chinese
- Baxter–Sagart (2014): l̥ˤa[t]-s qrət lˤat-s qrət
- Zhengzhang: /*tʰaːds qriɡ/ /*daːds qriɡ/

Birth name
- Traditional Chinese: 子履
- Simplified Chinese: 子履
Transcriptions
Standard Mandarin
- Hanyu Pinyin: zǐ lǚ
- Wade–Giles: tzu^{3} lü^{3}
Wu
- Romanization: tsy^{6} li^{6}
Yue: Cantonese
- Jyutping: zi^{2} lei^{5}
Middle Chinese
- Middle Chinese: tsiX lijX
Old Chinese
- Baxter–Sagart (2014): /*[ts]əʔ [r]ijʔ/
- Zhengzhang: /*ʔslɯʔ riʔ/

Tang of Shang, (Note: Chinese: 湯) (c. 1670 BC to c. 1587 BC, born Zi Lü) (Note: Chinese: 子履), recorded on oracle bones as Tai Yi or Da Yi, was the first king of the Shang dynasty. Tang is traditionally considered a virtuous ruler, as signified by his posthumous epithet Cheng Tang. (Note: Chinese: 成湯, variously translated as "Tang the Completer," "Tang the Perfect," among others.) According to legend, as the last leader of the Predynastic Shang he overthrew Jie, the last king of the Xia dynasty. As his reign precedes the Late Shang era, records of his life and reign are limited to oracle bone inscriptions and posthumous works.

== Names ==
Cheng Tang (成湯) is a posthumous title given to Tang after his death. Tang (唐 or 湯) is what is typically used by Zhou dynasty writers onwards.

In oracle bone inscriptions, Tang is referred to by either Da Yi (大乙) or Tai Yi (太乙), either of which can be seen in transcriptions by scholars depending on the interpretation of the oracle bone script character. The character yi in these names implies the day in which sacrifices were to be made to him by Shang dynasty religious practitioners, in this case the second of ten.

== Reign ==
=== During Predynastic Shang ===
Tang succeeded Shi Gui as ruler of Predynastic Shang, one of the many kingdoms under the suzerainty of the Xia dynasty, for 17 years. During Jie's reign, Shang grew in power, initially at the expense of Xia's other vassals. In the 15th year of Jie's reign, Tang began moving Lü to the capital Bo. About two years later, Tang sent his Minister of the Right, Yi Yin, as an envoy to Xia. Yi remained in the Xia capital for about three years, before returning to Shang, wherein he shared his distaste for Xia's political situation. At some point, he appointed a Minister of the Left, Zhong Hui, and enfeoffed him in Xue (薛).

Over various periods, Yi Yin continued to encourage Tang to go to war with Xia. However, simply conquering the Xia was not enough: Allies were needed first, and the vassal states of Xia must be weakened first. In the 21st year of Jie's reign, Tang began with capturing the Youluo (有洛) and forcing the Jing (荊) to surrender. In the next year, Jie imprisoned Tang in Xiatai (夏臺), but later released him, to which many neighbouring clans began to revere Shang.

The Shang's power continued to grow. In the 26th year of Jie's reign, Shang annihilated Wen (溫). Two years later, Shang was attacked by Kunwu, and several years of war between Shang and Kunwu followed. Despite this setback, Shang continued to expand on a number of fronts, gathering vassal troops in Jingpo. The Shang army and allied forces conquered Mixu (密須, today's Xinmi in Henan), Wei, and attacked Gu, which too was conquered the following year. About this time Zhong Gu, chief historian of Jie, would flee from the Xia to the Shang.

Overall, Tang was able to win many supporters from as many as 40 smaller kingdoms. Tang recognized that Jie mistreated his people and used this to convince others. According to legend, in one speech, Tang said that creating chaos was not something he wanted, but given the terror of Jie, he had to follow the Mandate of Heaven and use this opportunity to overthrow Xia. As an advantage he pointed out that even Jie's own military generals would not obey his orders.

==== Battle of Mingtiao ====
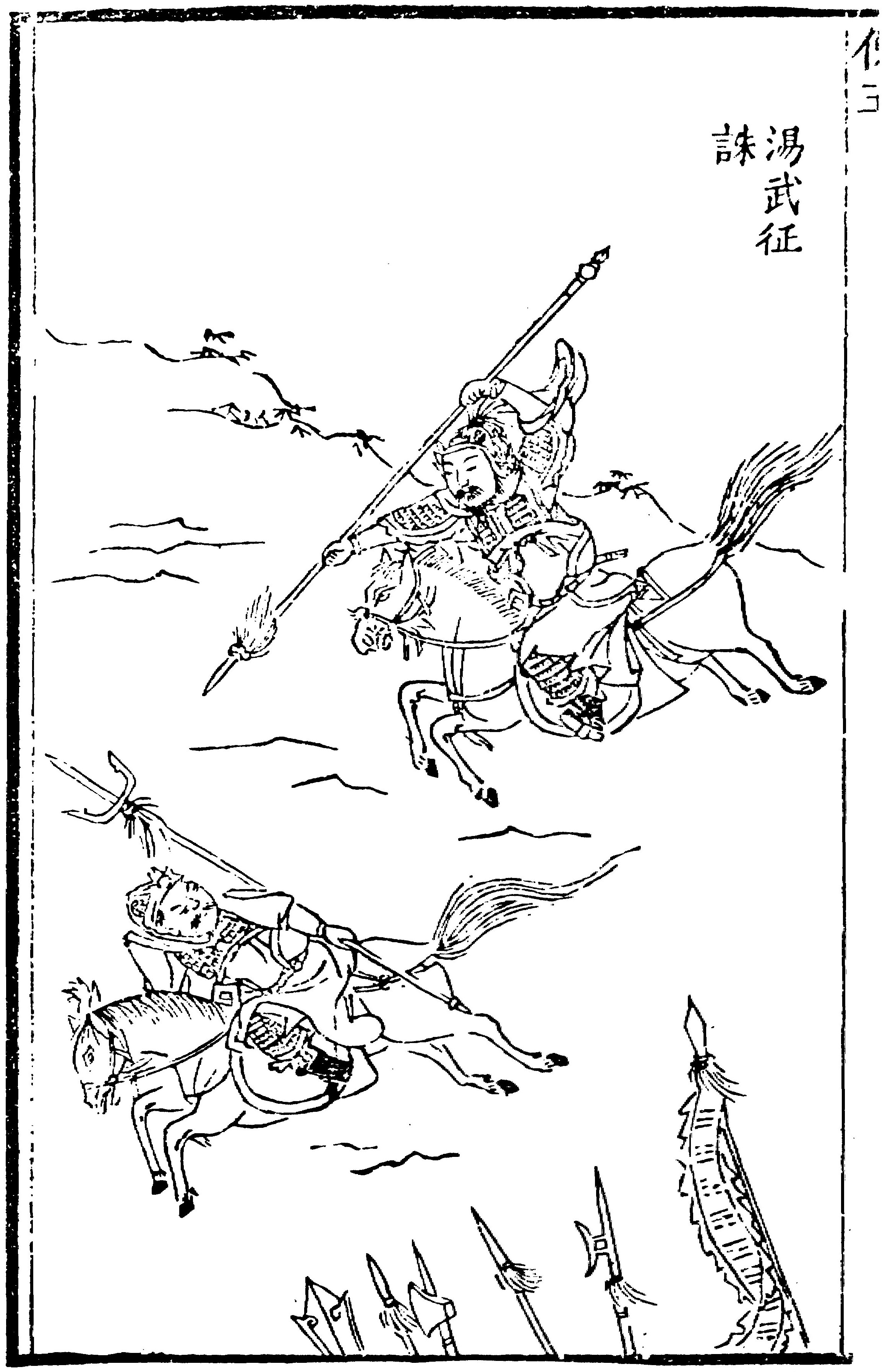
1736 illustration of Tang during a punitive expedition

The Shang army fought against Jie's Xia forces at Mingtiao (鳴條) in a heavy thunderstorm and defeated them.

Jie himself escaped and fled to Sanzong. The Shang forces under their general Wuzi pursued Jie to Cheng, captured him at Jiaomen, and deposed him, bringing the Xia dynasty to an end. Eventually, Jie was exiled in Nanchao, and Tang succeeded him as paramount King, inaugurating the Shang dynasty. Jie would eventually die of illness during a drought in Tingshan (亭山) 12 years later.

==== In the Book of Documents ====
The Book of Documents (尚書) contains a speech said to have been spoken by Tang after the Battle of Mingtiao, though its authenticity is disputed.

The king said, 'Come, ye multitudes of the people, listen all to my words. It is not I, the little child, who dare to undertake a rebellious enterprise; but for the many crimes of the sovereign of Xia, Heaven has given the charge to destroy him. Now, ye multitudes, you are saying, "Our prince does not compassionate us, but (is calling us) away from our husbandry to attack and punish Xia." I have indeed heard (these) words of you all; (but) the sovereign of Xia is guilty, and as I fear God, I dare not but punish him. Now you are saying, "What are the crimes of Xia to us?" The king of Xia in every way exhausts the strength of his people, and exercises oppression in the cities of Xia. His multitudes are become entirely indifferent (to his service), and feel no bond of union'(to him). They are saying, "When wilt thou, O sun, expire? We will all perish with thee." Such is the course of (the sovereign) of Xia, and now I must go (and punish him).
Assist, I pray you, me, the One man, to carry out the punishment appointed by Heaven. I will greatly reward you. On no account disbelieve me - I will not eat my words. If you do not obey the words which I have thus spoken to you, I will put your children to death with you - you shall find no forgiveness.
- James Legge translation, 1865

=== Progenitor of the Shang dynasty ===
Tang's reign was regarded as a good time by the Chinese. He lowered taxes and the conscription rate of soldiers. His influence spread to the Yellow River, and many outlying tribes, such as Di and Qiang, became vassal states. He also established Anyang as the new capital of China.

According to the Bamboo Annals, Tang built a palace called Xia She (夏社) to memorialize the Xia dynasty. In the first five years of his reign, there was a constant drought. Tang ordered golden coins to be made and distributed to poor families who had been forced to sell their children because of the drought. It was intended for them to use this money to buy their children back. The Xinshu (新書) by Jia Yi notes that Tang had stockpiled around 10 years of resources during his reign over Predynastic Shang, which allowed his people to overcome the drought.

In the 9th year of his reign, Tang moved the Nine Tripod Cauldrons, made by Yu the Great, to the Shang Palace.

In Records of the Grand Historian, Tang is recorded as going on punitive expeditions to ensure that sacrificial rituals as part of the Shang state religion are upheld. The penalty for not upholding proper sacrifice, as shown in his dialogue with the chief of the State of Ge, was death; forgiveness was not on the table.

== Personal life ==
Tang was a descendent of Xie, making him a descendent of Emperor Ku and the legendary Yellow Emperor. Tang had two consorts who were recorded in oracle bones, their temple names being Bi Jia (妣甲) and Bi Bing (妣丙).

The Great Learning chapter of the Book of Rites notes that Tang's bathtub had an engraving stating: "If you can one day renovate yourself, do so from day to day. Yea, let there be daily renovation." (茍日新，日日新，又日新).

Tang maintained a close relationship with his minister Yi Yin (伊尹), the title yin "尹" itself meaning "minister" or "official." Their connection was made through Yi Yin's cooking skills; whilst cooking meals for Tang, Yi Yin would advise him on balancing the five flavours (sweet, sour, bitter, pungent, and salty) and regulation of temperature. This led to Yi Yin eventually giving his informed political opinions, allowing him to achieve this ministerial position.

Tang is said to have composed several works, though they are considered lost;

- Dahuole 大濩樂, composed during a period of mourning.
- Xiashe 夏社、Yizhi 疑至、and Chenhu 臣扈, poems composed after not being able to move the Xia shrine.

== In oracle bone inscriptions ==
Tang is recorded as Da Yi (大乙) in oracle bone inscriptions, the records of him totalling around 350. Sacrifices made towards Tang were particularly grandiose, such as the use of a xiang sacrifice involving a large-scale banquet in his honour, and the use of drums to announce a sacrifice to him:

貞大乙祖丁暨饗
Test: Should we perform a banquet in the honour of Da Yi and Zu Ding together?

庚子貞其告鼓于大乙六牛惟龜祝
On the gengzi [庚子] day, may we announce with drums to Da Yi with six oxen? And is it with a turtle with which we shall pray?

Additionally, Tang, alongside his consorts, would occasionally receive sacrifices, such as in this example with Bi Bing:

其侑妣丙暨大乙𫹉王受祐
May we perform a "you" [侑] sacrifice for Bi Bing and Da Yi? With a you [𫹉] sacrifice, would the ruler receive protection?

Animal sacrifices would be of similarly high quantity, typically performed with you 侑 ("to urge [someone] to eat") sacrifices consisting of dining with a given ancestor.

辛未卜來乙亥侑大乙五牢
On the xinwei [辛未] day, scapulimancy was performed. Come the yihai [乙亥] day, should we make a you [侑] sacrifice to Da Yi of five oxen?

== Legacy ==
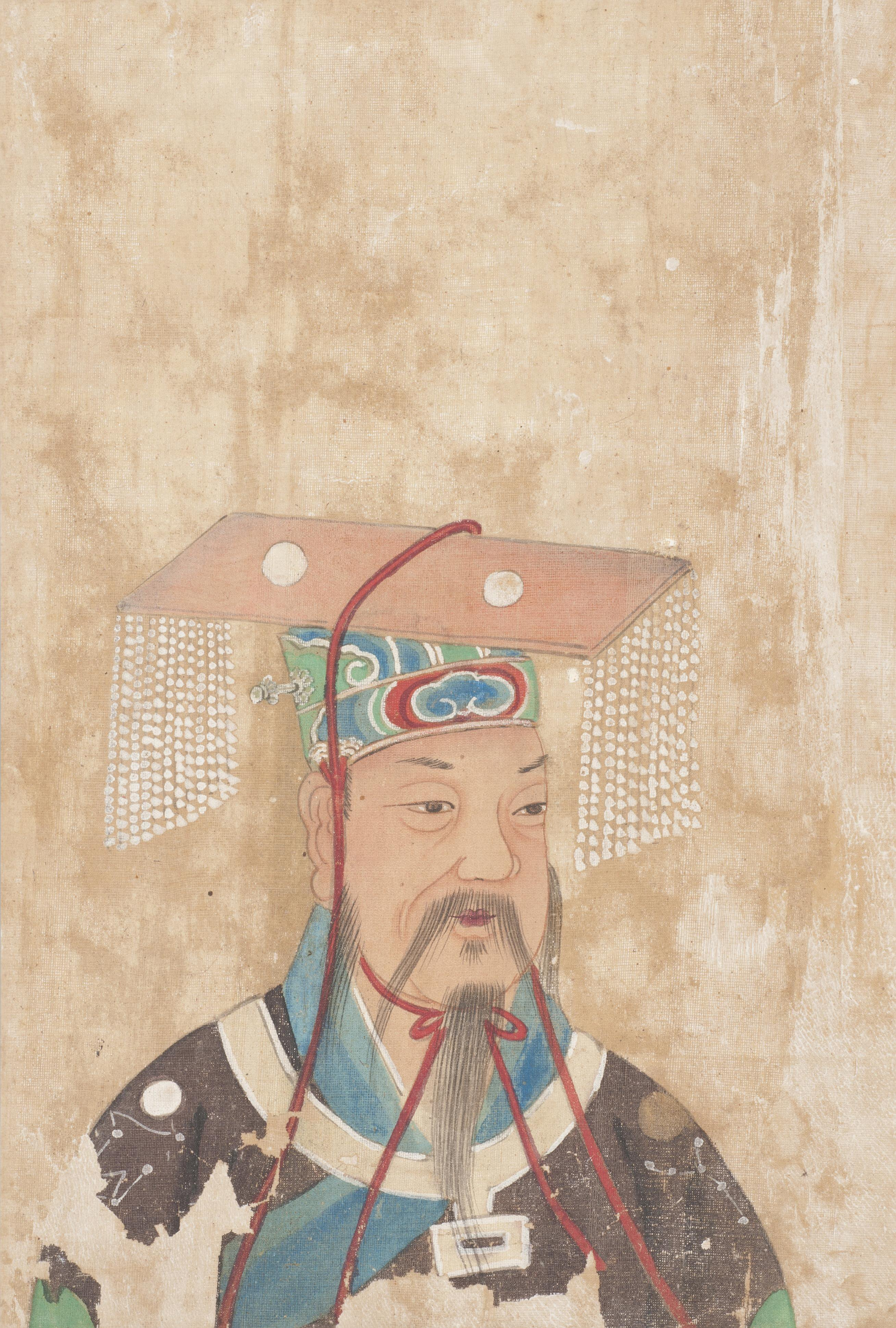
As depicted in the c. 1900 album Portraits of Famous Men, housed in the Philadelphia Museum of Art

Tang of Shang is mentioned in myriad texts across the Classical Chinese canon, usually alongside Emperor Yao, Emperor Shun, and King Wu of Zhou as examples of good rulers. This is often in contrast to Di Xin and Jie of Xia. In the Three Character Classic of the Song dynasty, Tang is paired with Yu the Great and King Wu of Zhou as the "Three Kings" (三王).

=== In the Classic of Poetry ===
Tang is mentioned in each of the Classic of Poetry's Sacrificial Odes of Shang (商頌), usually in the context of asserting descent and expressing reverence. For example, in Xuanniao (玄鳥), Tang is documented as being ordered by an ancient thearch to govern the four directions:

古帝命武湯，正域彼四方。
Then an ancient thearch ordered General Tang; it was to govern the four directions.

Furthermore, in Na (那) and Liezu (烈祖), both mention Tang directly in closing, both with the following quote:

顧予烝嘗、湯孫之將。
Thus offered by I; a descendent of Tang!

Mao Heng, the one to number each Ode, notes that Na in particular was for sacrificial rites towards Tang.

=== Evaluation in Confucianism ===
Tang is one of several rulers cited in Confucian texts as a model ruler. Particularly, Tang is noted as having internalised the ruling styles of Emperor Yao and Emperor Shun, but not necessarily being beholden to them, formulating a distinct style of government.

Mencius pays particular attention to Tang's form of government in his discourse with King Hui of Wei, believing that his humane conquest of the Xia dynasty occurred because he utilised all 70 li of his kingdom. The humanness of Tang was exemplified by his commencement in Ge, punishing the rulers but consoling the people. He also notes that Tang had employed his minister Yi Yin based on merit, something Zi Xia took notice of in the Analects.

=== Evaluation in Legalism ===
In his eponymous book, Han Fei uses Tang's reign resulting from Yi Yin's reform as an example of political reform by not following antiquity. By not being beholden to the traditions of those who came before him, acting in ways that would be laughed at by people in his day, Tang was able to overthrow a corrupt institution. However, the use of force is viewed as a dangerous precedent; as Tang (and King Wu of Zhou) was, by definition, a usurper who executed people and ministers, using him as a general model, in Han Fei's view, could lead to more attempts to take power. It is for this reason that Han Fei condemns the dethroning of Jie of Xia in the strongest terms, believing Tang's uprising to be the reason for usurpation not being uncommon in his time, citing cases such as the State of Qi.

In The Book of Lord Shang, Tang of Shang and King Wu of Zhou are mentioned as having prohibited state reliance on five specific types of people: Scholars who discuss poetry and books; recluses; warriors; artisans; and merchants. This is used to form an argument that when these individuals are relied upon, neglect of agriculture and the weakening of the military and state authority are sure to follow.

== Myths ==
Tang has been portrayed in different ways in Chinese mythology and these portrayals have influenced popular depiction and paintings of him.

He is often drawn as being "a nine-foot-tall, white-faced, whiskered man with a pointed head, six-jointed arms, and a body markedly larger on one side than on the other."

A tradition about the I Ching was that most of it was written by Tang of Shang.

== Notes ==
Tang of Shang Predynastic Shang / Shang dynasty
Regnal titles
Preceded by Shi Gui	King of Shang	Succeeded by Himself as King of the Shang dynasty
Preceded by Jie (Xia dynasty)	King of China	Succeeded by Da Ding
