= Shinzo Shinjo =

Japanese academic administrator (1873–1938)

Shinzō Shinjō
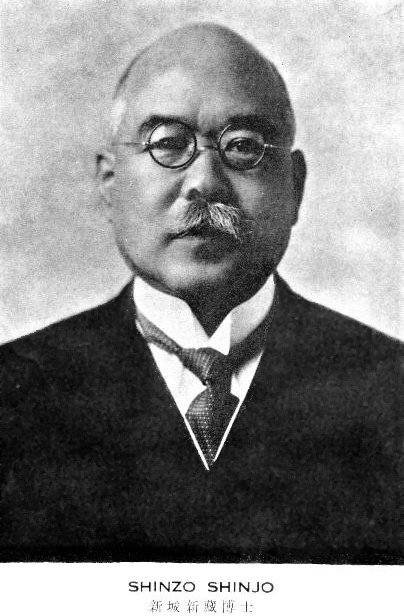
- Born: 29 August 1873; Aizuwakamatsu, Japan
- Died: 1 August 1938 (aged 64); Kyōto, Japan
- Scientific career
- Fields: Astrophysics, geodesy

Shinzō Shinjō (新城 新蔵, Shinjō Shinzō; 26 August 1873 – 1 August 1938) was a Japanese academic, physicist, astronomer and president of Kyoto University.

== Biography ==
Shinzō Shinjō was born on 26 August 1873 in Aizuwakamatsu, Fukushima Prefecture. He graduated from Department of Physics at Imperial College of Science in 1895 and in 1897 started teaching at a military engineering school. In 1900 he assumed a position of associate professor at Kyoto University in the field of mechanics. Between 1905 and 1907 Shinjo studied astronomy at University of Goettingen in Germany with Karl Schwarzschild. He defended his PhD in 1909 and later began teaching at a newly established Department of Astronomy in Kyoto. Shinjo was president of Kyoto University from 1929 through 1933. He died of heatstroke in Nanjing in 1938.

== Work ==
Research work of Shinjo was mostly concentrated in geodesy, astrophysics and ancient Chinese astronomical history. He spent much effort on accurate measurements of the Earth gravity and magnetic field, which were important in that time. His field measurements were mostly performed in Japan, Germany (Potsdam), China (Singapore), Manchuria and Korea, and he also explored the gravity of the Japan Trench using a navy submarine in 1934. His astronomy achievements included establishment and development of the Space Physics Laboratory at Kyoto University in 1918, where he studied meteors, variable and binary stars.

== Selected works ==
In a statistical overview derived from writings by and about Shinzō Shinjō, OCLC/WorldCat encompasses roughly 40+ works in 50+ publications in 4 languages and 200+ library holdings.

- On the rotation of celestial bodies (1918), in English
- Superstition (迷信) (1925)
- 東洋天文學史研究 (1928)
- 東洋天文學史研究 (1933)
- 科學 (天文) (1935)
- Ancient Chinese Astronomy (中國上古天文) (1936)
