= Bu Bing =

Bu Bing 卜丙

King of the Shang dynasty
- Reign: c. 1587 B. C. - ?
- Predecessor: King Tang
- Successor: Da Geng
Full name
- Family name: Zǐ (子); Given name: Shèng (胜)
Posthumous name
- Bu Bing (卜丙)
- Father: King Tang

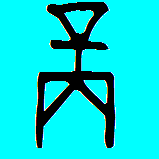
Oracle symbols of the Shang Dynasty

Bu Bing (Chinese: 卜丙; pinyin: Bǔ Bǐng; Wade–Giles: Pu-Ping) or Wai Bing (Chinese: 外丙; pinyin: Wài Bǐng; Wade–Giles: Wai-Ping) (born Zǐ Shèng Chinese: 子勝; pinyin: Zǐ Shèng; Wade–Giles: Tzu-Sheng), was the second king of the Shang dynasty, according to the Records of the Grand Historian.

In the Records of the Grand Historian, he was listed by Sima Qian as the second Shang king, succeeding his father Tang, following the earlier death of his elder brother Tai Ding. He was enthroned in the year of Yihai (乙亥), with Yi Yin as his prime minister and Bo (亳) as his capital. He ruled for about 2 years before his death. He was given the posthumous name Wai Bing and was succeeded by his younger brother.

Oracle script inscriptions, on bones unearthed at Yinxu, alternatively record that he was the fourth Shang king, the second son of Da Ding, given the posthumous name "Bu Bing" (卜丙), and succeeded by Da Geng. The substitution of Wai (外) for Bu (卜) is a scribal transmission error dating to antiquity.

Bu Bing Shang dynasty
Regnal titles
Preceded by Da Jia	King of China	Succeeded by Da Geng
