= Bamboo Annals =

Chronicle of ancient China (to 299 BC)

- Original title: 竹書紀年
- Language: Classical Chinese
- Subject: ancient Chinese history
- Publication date: before 296 BC
- Publication place: State of Wei, ancient China

Chinese name
- Traditional Chinese: 竹書紀年
- Simplified Chinese: 竹书纪年
- Literal meaning: Bamboo Books Annals
Transcriptions
Standard Mandarin
- Hanyu Pinyin: Zhúshū Jìnián
- Wade–Giles: Chu^{2}-shu^{1} chi^{4}-nien^{2}
- IPA: [ʈʂǔ.ʂú tɕî.njɛ̌n]
Yue: Cantonese
- Yale Romanization: Jūk-syū gei-nìhn
- Jyutping: Zuk^{1}-syu^{1} gei^{3}-nin^{4}
Southern Min
- Tâi-lô: Tiok-su kí-liân
Middle Chinese
- Middle Chinese: trjuwk syo kiX nen
Old Chinese
- Baxter–Sagart (2014): *truk s-ta C.k(r)ə(ʔ)-s C.nˤing

The Bamboo Annals (Chinese: 竹書紀年; pinyin: Zhúshū Jìnián), also known as the Ji Tomb Annals (Chinese: 汲冢紀年; pinyin: Jí Zhǒng Jìnián), is a chronicle of ancient China. It begins in the earliest legendary time (the age of the Yellow Emperor) and extends to 299 BC, with the later centuries focusing on the history of the State of Wei in the Warring States period. It thus covers a similar period to Sima Qian's Records of the Grand Historian (91 BC). The original may have been lost during the Song dynasty, and the text is known today in two versions, a "current text" (or "modern text") of disputed authenticity and an incomplete "ancient text".

== Textual history ==
The original text was buried with King Xiang of Wei (died 296 BC) and re-discovered nearly six centuries later in 281 AD (Western Jin dynasty) in the Jizhong discovery. For this reason, the chronicle survived the burning of the books by Emperor Qin Shi Huang. Other texts recovered from the same tomb included Guoyu, I Ching, and the Tale of King Mu. They were written on bamboo slips, the usual writing material of the Warring States period, and it is from this that the name of the text derives. The strips were arranged in order and transcribed by court scholars. According to Du Yu, who saw the original strips, the text began with the Xia dynasty. He also stated that it used the Zhou royal calendar until 784 BC, when it switched to the calendar of the state of Jin and then that of its successor, the state of Wei. Du noted that this implied that the book was the state chronicle of Wei. Pei Yin (裴駰, 5th century) states that the book began with the Yellow Emperor. This version, consisting of 13 scrolls, was lost during the Song dynasty. A 3-scroll version of the Annals is mentioned in the History of Song (1345), but its relationship to the other versions is not known.

The "current text" (今本 jīnběn) is a 2-scroll version of the text printed in the late 16th century. The first scroll contains a sparse narrative of the pre-dynastic emperors (beginning with the Yellow Emperor), the Xia dynasty and the Shang dynasty. The narrative is interspersed with longer passages on portents, which are identical to passages in the late 5th century Book of Song. The second scroll contains a more detailed account of the history of the Western Zhou, the state of Jin and its successor state Wei, and has no portent passages. This version gave years according to the sexagenary cycle, a practice that began in the Han dynasty. Discrepancies between the text and quotations of the earlier text in older books led scholars such as Qian Daxin and Shinzō Shinjō to dismiss the "current" version as a forgery, a view still widely held. Other scholars, notably David Nivison and Edward Shaughnessy, argue that substantial parts of it are faithful copies of the original text.

The "ancient text" (古本 gǔběn) is a partial version assembled through painstaking examination of quotations of the lost original in pre-Song works by Zhu Youzeng (late 19th century), Wang Guowei (1917) and Fan Xiangyong (1956). Fang Shiming and Wang Xiuling (1981) have systematically collated all the available quotations, instead of following earlier scholars in trying to merge variant forms of a passage into a single text. The two works that provide the most quotations, the Shui Jing Zhu (527) and Sima Zhen's Shiji Suoyin (early 8th century), seem to be based on slightly different versions of the text. This version includes two sexagenary year designations (for the first year of Emperor Yao and for the Zhou attack on Shang), indicating some tampering with the text before it was quoted.

== Translations ==
- (in French) Biot, Édouard (1841–42). "Tchou-chou-ki-nien, Annales de bambou Tablettes chronologiques du Livre écrit sur bambou", Journal asiatique, Third series, 12, pp. 537–78, and 13, pp. 203–207, 381–431.
- Legge, James (1865). "The Annals of the Bamboo Books", in "Prolegomena", The Chinese Classics, volume 3, part 1, pp. 105–188. Rpt. (1960) Hong Kong: Hong Kong University Press.
- Nivison, David (2009). The Riddle of the Bamboo Annals (Zhushu Jinian Jiemi 竹書紀年解謎). Taipei: Airiti Press.

== See also ==
- Tsinghua Bamboo Slips
