= Chunwei =

Chinese name associated with the Xiongnu peoples

Chunwei (Chinese: 淳維; Old Chinese: ZS: *djun-ɢʷi; B-S: *[d]u[r]-ɢʷij) is a name associated with the Xiongnu, a tribal confederation of nomadic peoples who, according to ancient Chinese sources, inhabited the eastern Eurasian Steppe from the 3rd century BC to the late 1st century AD.

== Overview ==
In Sima Qian's Shiji, the Xiongnu were mentioned as Shanrong, Xianyun, and Hunyu "since before the time of Tang [i.e. Emperor Yao] and Yu [i.e. Emperor Shun]".

3rd century scholar Wei Zhao also identified the name Chunwei with the name of the Xiongnu: "During the Han (206 BC – 220 AD) they were called Xiongnu, and the Hunyu is just another name for the same people, and similarly, the Xunyu is just another transcription of Chunwei, their ancestor’s name". In Shiji jijie (Collected Explanations on Historical Records) Liu Song historian Pei Yin quoted Jin Zhuo's statement that "In Yao's time they were called Hunyu; in Zhou's time they were called Xianyun; in Qin's time they were called Xiongnu." In Shiji Suoyin "Seeking the Obscure in the Records", Tang historian Sima Zhen quoted from Fengsu Tongyi "Comprehensive Meaning of Customs and Mores", by Ying Shao, that "In the time of Yin, they were called Xunyu, which was changed to Xiongnu"; however, this quote no longer exists in Fengsu Tongyi's received text.

Sima Qian wrote that the Xiongnu's ruling clan were descendants of Chunwei, a descendant of Yu the Great. Chunwei is alleged to be a son of Jie of Xia (the Xia dynasty's last ruler). Sima Zhen stated that Yue Chan wrote in the now-lost Guadipu (Register of the Encompassing Lands) that: "Jie, (ruler of) the House of Xia lived an immoral life. Tang exiled him to Mingtiao, he died there three years later. His son Xunyu married his concubines and they wandered far away to the northern wilderness in search of pasture lands, and then in the Middle Kingdom they were mentioned as Xiongnu." Sima Zhen also quoted Zhang Yan's statement that "Chunwei, during the Yin era, fled to the northern borders."

However, Goldin (2011) points out chronological difficulties resulting from attempts to identify Chunwei with Hunyu and Xunyu. (Note: Goldin transliterates both 葷粥 (in Yue Chan's Guadipu) & 獯粥 (in Sima Zhen's Suoyin) in pinyin as Xunyu and proposes that they were both pronounced *xur-luk in Old Chinese. Other versions of the same name are 獯鬻 in Mencius and 薰育 in "Annals of Zhou" of Shiji.) If one would literally interpret "since before the time of Tang and Yu" (when the Hunyu had supposedly existed) (Note: Sima Qian states that the Yellow Emperor himself drove out the Hunyu 葷粥 in the North.) in Sima Qian's Shiji and would identify Chunwei with Hunyu and Xunyu, this would result in Chunwei, allegedly a son of Jie of the Xia dynasty, living before instead of many generations after Yao and Shun, both of whom had lived and ruled before the Xia dynasty. Moreover, Goldin (2011) reconstructs the Old Chinese pronunciations of Hunyu and Xunyu as *xur-luk, as hram′-lun′, and as *xoŋ-NA; and comments all three names are "manifestly unrelated"; he further states that sound changes made the names more superficially similar than they really had been, and prompted later historians and commentators to conclude that those names must have referred to one same people in different epochs, even though people during the Warring States period would never have been thus misled.

Another theory suggests that Qi (a small state, supposedly descendants of Xia) later occupied a smaller state called "Chunyu" and made it their last capital before being conquered by Chu. Chunyu/Chunwei may simply be the name of a city.

== See also ==
- List of past Chinese ethnic groups
