= Xunyu =

Chinese ancient nomadic tribe

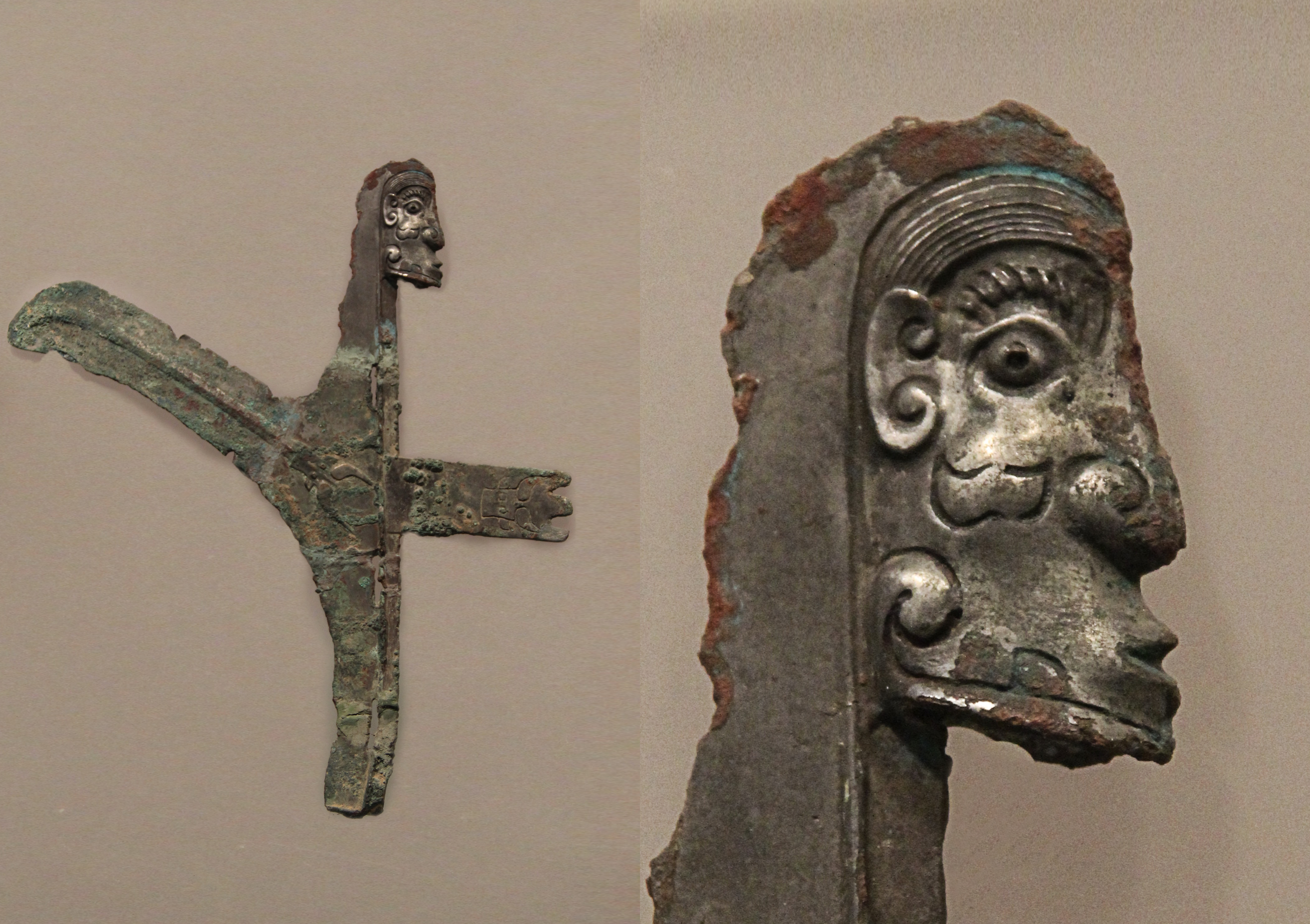
Anthropomorphic axe, bronze, excavated in the tomb of Heibo (潶伯), a military noble in charge of protecting the northern frontier, at Baicaopo, Lingtai County, Western Zhou period (1045–771 BCE). Gansu Museum. This is considered as a possible depiction of a Xianyun or Guifang.

The Xunyu (Chinese: 獯鬻; Wade–Giles: Hsünyü; Old Chinese: (ZS) *qʰun-lug, (Schuessler): *hun-juk) is the name of an ancient nomadic tribe which invaded China during legendary times. They are traditionally identified with the Guifang, the Xianyun and the Xiongnu.

Sima Zhen quoted Zhang Yan (張晏) as saying that “Chunwei, during the Yin era, fled to the northern borders.”; immediately after, Sima Zhen stated that Yue Chan (樂產) wrote in the now-lost Guadipu (括地譜) "Register of the Encompassing Lands" that: “Jie, (ruler of) the House of Xia lived an immoral life. Tang exiled him to Mingtiao, he died there three years later. His son Xunyu 獯粥 married his concubines and they wandered far away to the northern wilderness in search of pasture lands, and then in the Middle Kingdom they were mentioned as Xiongnu 匈奴.” Wei Zhao identified the names Chunwei and Hunyu with the name of the Xiongnu: “During the Han (206 BC-220 AD) they were called Xiongnu 匈奴, and the Hunyu 葷粥 is just another name for the same people, and similarly, the Xunyu 獯粥 is just another transcription of Chunwei 淳維, their ancestor’s name”. Jin Zhuo stated that: "In Yao's time they were called Hunyu; in Zhou's time they were called Xianyun; in Qin's time they were called Xiongnu." Sima Zhen quoted from Fengsu Tongyi (風俗通義) "Comprehensive Meaning of Customs and Mores", by Ying Shao 應劭, that “In the time of Yin, they were called Xunyu [獯粥], which was changed to Xiongnu [匈奴]”; however, this quote no longer exists in Fengsu Tongyi's received text.

Based on phonetical studies and comparisons of inscriptions on bronze and the structure of the characters, Wang Guowei (1877–1927) came to the conclusion that the tribal names Guifang (鬼方), Xunyu, Xianyu (鮮虞), Xianyun (獫狁), Rong, Di, and Hu in the old annals designated one and the same people, who later entered Chinese history under the name Xiongnu,

The exact time period when the nomads' ethnonym had the Old Chinese phonetizations ancestral to standard Chinese Xunyu remains determined only vaguely. They were mentioned in legends involving legendary Zhou ruler Old Duke Father Dan (古公亶父; Gǔgōng Dǎnfù): in the book Mencius (published c. 300 BCE) as 獯鬻 Xunyu, and in Records of the Grand Historian (published c. 91 BC) as Hunyu 葷粥 or Xunyu 薰育.

Using Sima Qian's Records of the Grand Historian and other sources, Vsevolod Taskin proposes that in the earlier pre-historic period (i.e. the time of the legendary Yellow Emperor) the Xiongnu were called Hunyu; and in the late pre-historic period (i.e. the time of the legendary Emperor Yao and Emperor Shun) they were called Rong; in the literate period starting with the Shang dynasty (1600–1046 BC) they were called Guifang, in the Zhou period (1045–256 BC) they were called Xianyun, and starting from the Qin period (221–206 BC) the Chinese annalists called them Xiongnu.

Even so, Paul R. Goldin (2011) reconstructs the Old Chinese pronunciations of 葷粥 ~ 獯鬻 ~ 獯鬻 ~ 薰育 as *xur-luk, 獫狁 as hram′-lun′, and 匈奴 as *xoŋ-NA; and comments all three names are "manifestly unrelated". He further states that sound changes made the names more superficially similar than they really had been, and prompted later commentators to conclude that those names must have referred to one same people in different epochs, even though people during the Warring States period would never have been thus misled.

== See also ==
- Ethnic groups in Chinese history
- Guifang
- Xianyun
- Chunwei
- Xiongnu
