= Wuzhong =

Wuzhong may refer to:

- Suzhou, Jiangsu, formerly known as Wuzhong (吴中)
  - Wuzhong District (吴中区), Suzhou, Jiangsu
- Wuzhong, Ningxia (吴忠市), prefecture-level city in Ningxia
- Wuzhong (無終) people to the north of China circa 700BC, said to be part of the Shanrong, who lived near Beijing, or Taiyuan, or north towards the State of Yan
