= Shanrong =

Nomadic people in Ancient China

Shanrong (Chinese: 山戎), or Rong (Chinese: 戎) were an Old Chinese nomadic people of ancient China.

== Origin ==
Shanrong translates to the "mountain Rong". The Rong were a collection of nomadic tribes that lived in Northern China during the Spring and Autumn period, and are believed to have been of the same ethnic group as the Northern Rong. Although they were a vassal state of the Zhou dynasty, the Shanrong would not pay tribute to the King of Zhou and eventually became a threat to the Central Plain.

The Duke Huan of Qi (679BC) summoned their vassal states to the summit in Juancheng, becoming the first hegemon of the Spring and Autumn period. Duke Huan intended to solve their conflicts with the Shanrong nomads and southern state Chu to gain other states' respect.

Shanrong army attacked the State of Yan (664BC), which led to Yan asking Qi for help, Duke Huan of Qi led the coalition army northern bound which led to the Shanrong to retreat in the following year.

Coalition forces continued north, defeating Shanrong at Wuzhong Mount (无终山), present-day Pan Mountain. Eventually, the Shanrong leader fled to Guzhu. The coalition forces did not stop there and defeated both Guzhu and Shanrong as well as another nomadic state called Lingzhi (令支) before returning.

== Other nomadic tribes ==
- Quanrong
- Guifang
- Xianyun
- Chunwei
- Xirong
- Murong
- Tuoba

== See also ==
- Xianbei
- Xiongnu
- Xueyantuo
- Khitan
- Jurchen people
