= Xianyun =

Ancient tribal confederation north of China

Xianyun
猃狁

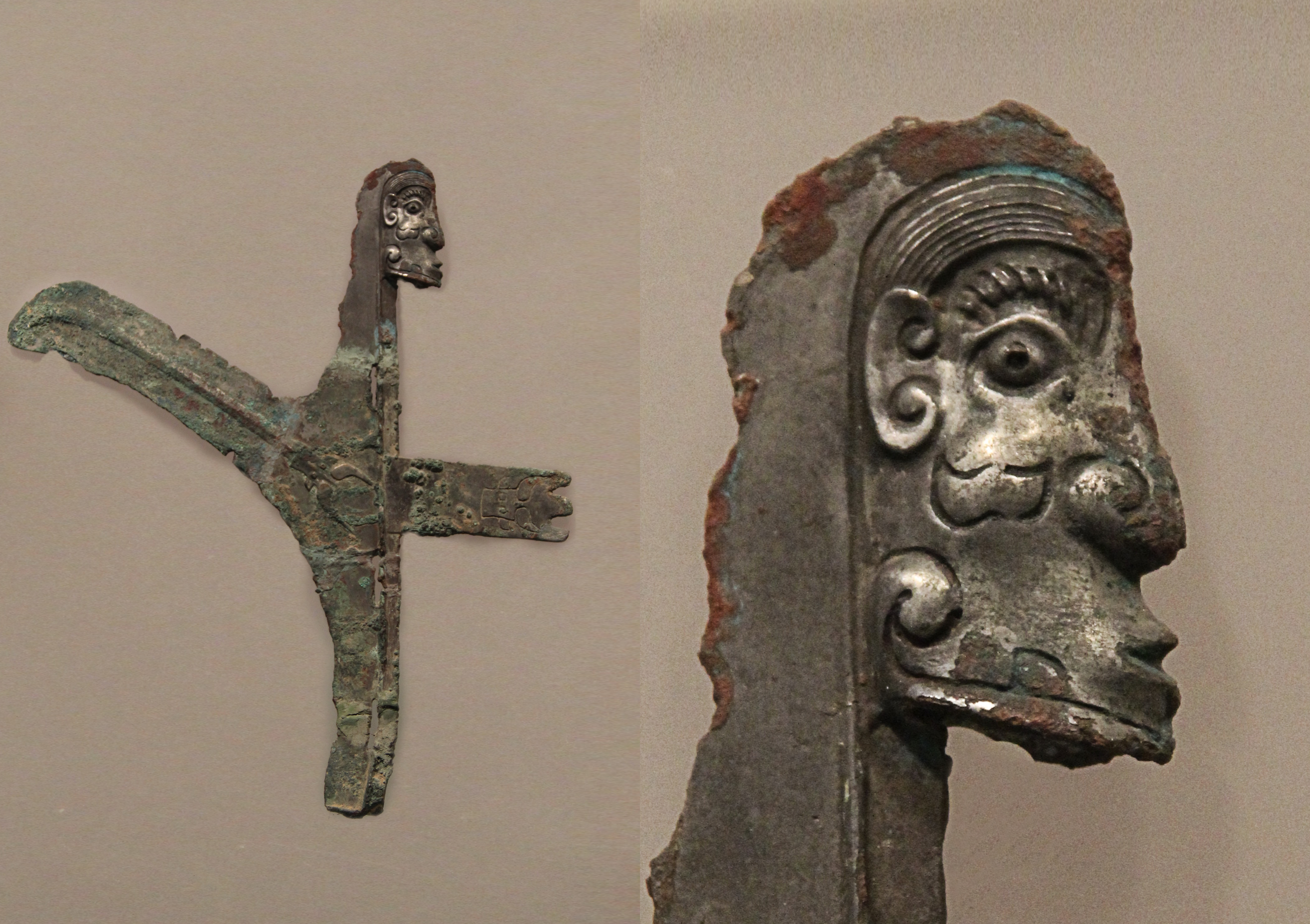
Anthropomorphic axe, bronze, excavated in the tomb of Heibo (潶伯), a military noble in charge of protecting the northern frontier, at Baicaopo, Lingtai County, Western Zhou period (1045–771 BC). Gansu Museum. This is considered as a possible Chinese depiction of a Xianyun or Guifang.
"Europoid faces" are also known from Western Zhou scabbard ornaments of the 10th century BC, suggesting that people of "probably West Asian—origins may have arrived at China's northwestern borders" around that time.

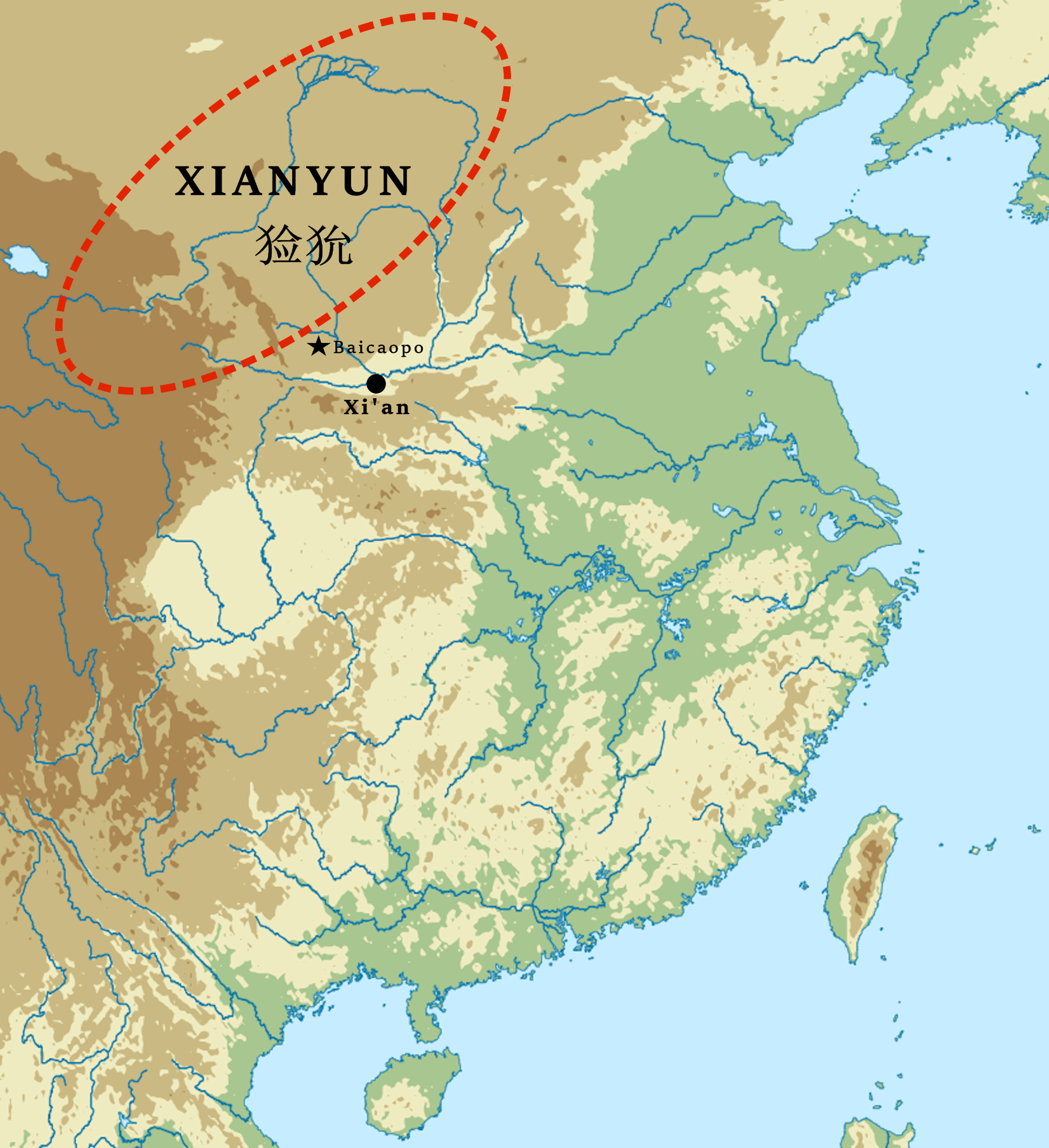
General location of the Xianyun, who "lived in an area that stretched from the Hetao (bend of the Yellow River) to the upper Yellow River Valley", with the Chinese capital Xi'an and Western Zhou frontier outpost of Baicaopo next to this area.

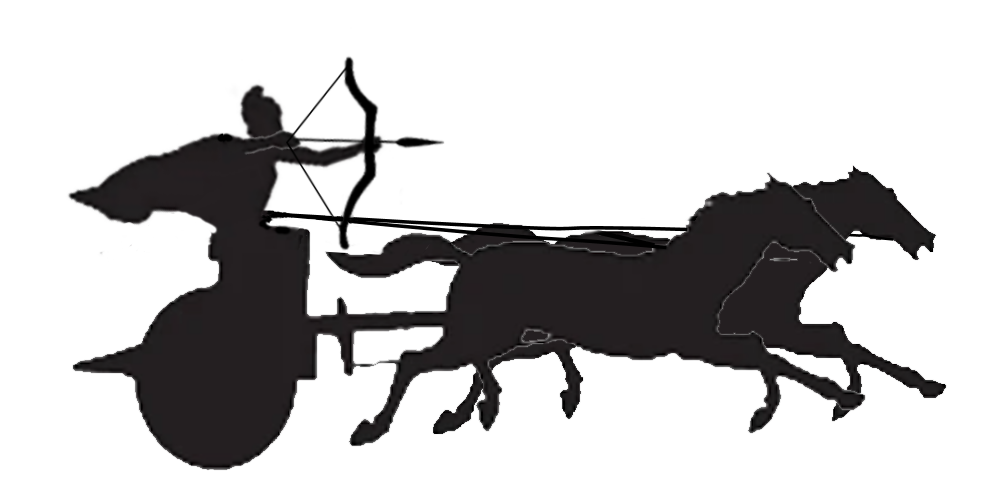
Hypothetical reconstruction of an early Eastern Eurasian chariot, of a type known since the Afanasievo culture in Southern Siberia and Mongolia, 3000–1500 BCE, and recorded among the Deer stones culture (1400–700 BCE) in northern and central Mongolia.

The Xianyun (simplified Chinese: 猃狁; traditional Chinese: 獫狁, 玁狁; pinyin: Xiǎnyǔn; Wade–Giles: Hsien-yün; Old Chinese: (ZS) *g.ramʔ-lunʔ; (Schuessler) *hɨamᴮ-juinᴮ < *hŋamʔ-junʔ) was an ancient nomadic tribe that invaded the Zhou dynasty. This Chinese exonym is written with xian 獫 or 玁 'long-snouted dog', and this 'dog' radical 犭 is commonly used in graphic pejorative characters. Xianyun was the preferred designation for northern tribes during the Zhou dynasty, earlier designations being the Xunyu, Guifang (Xia and Shang dynasties), and later ones being the Xiongnu, during the Han dynasty.

== Overview ==
The Xianyun appear to have been a fairly structured society occupying a broad expanse from the Hetao area of the Yellow River to the Upper Yellow River valley. Xianyun society was fairly uniform culturally, with a high level of concentration at the top, and was capable of coordinated action against the Zhou dynasty. "Xianyun" was probably their self-designated endonym, while the Zhou tended to call them using the general term Rong, (戎, "Warlike people"). These terms were rather interchangeable: a poem probably composed during the reign of Yih (899–892 BC) describes incursions alternatively by the Rong (戎) and the Di (狄), and concludes that the Xianyu destroyed everything.

The Xianyun used bronze objects, such as bronze helmets, spears, ding (鼎) and pu (铺) vessels, which were captured and recorded by the Zhou and cast into their own ding ceremonial vessels, all during the reigns of Yih and Xiao (899–886 BC). Like the Zhou, they also used war chariots, up to 400 in one offensive. They attacked the vicinity of the capital Haojing (modern Xi'an), all during the reign of King Xuan of Zhou (827/25–782 BC).

The earliest archaeological records mentioning the Xianyun appear in great number during the reign of King Xuan of Zhou (827/25–782 BC). The Book of Songs contains four songs about military actions between the Zhou and the Xianyun. The song "Gathering sow thistle" (Cai qi) mentions 3,000 Zhou chariots in battle against the Xianyun. The song "Sixth month" (Liu yue) says that the battlefield was between the lower courses of the Jing (泾河) and Luo rivers and the Wei valley, very close to the center of the Zhou state.

Written records place the first incursions against Zhou under the name Xirong "Western Rong" in 843 BC.

In 840 BC, the fourteenth year of reign of King Li of Zhou (877–841 BC), the Xianyun reached the Zhou capital Haojing, as reported in the inscription of the Duo You ding: "It was in the tenth month, because the Xianyun greatly arose and broadly attacked Jingshi, [it] was reported to the king. The king commanded Duke Wu: “Dispatch your most capable men and pursue at Jingshi!” Duke Wu commanded Duoyou: “Lead the ducal chariots and pursue at Jingshi!” (...) Duoyou had cut off heads and captured prisoners to be interrogated: in all, using the ducal chariots to cut off 205 heads, to capture 23 prisoners, and to take 117 Rong chariots". Apparently, the "Western Rong" and Xianyun were the same people here, named in the first case by a generic term meaning "warlike tribes of the west" and in the second case by their actual ethnonym.

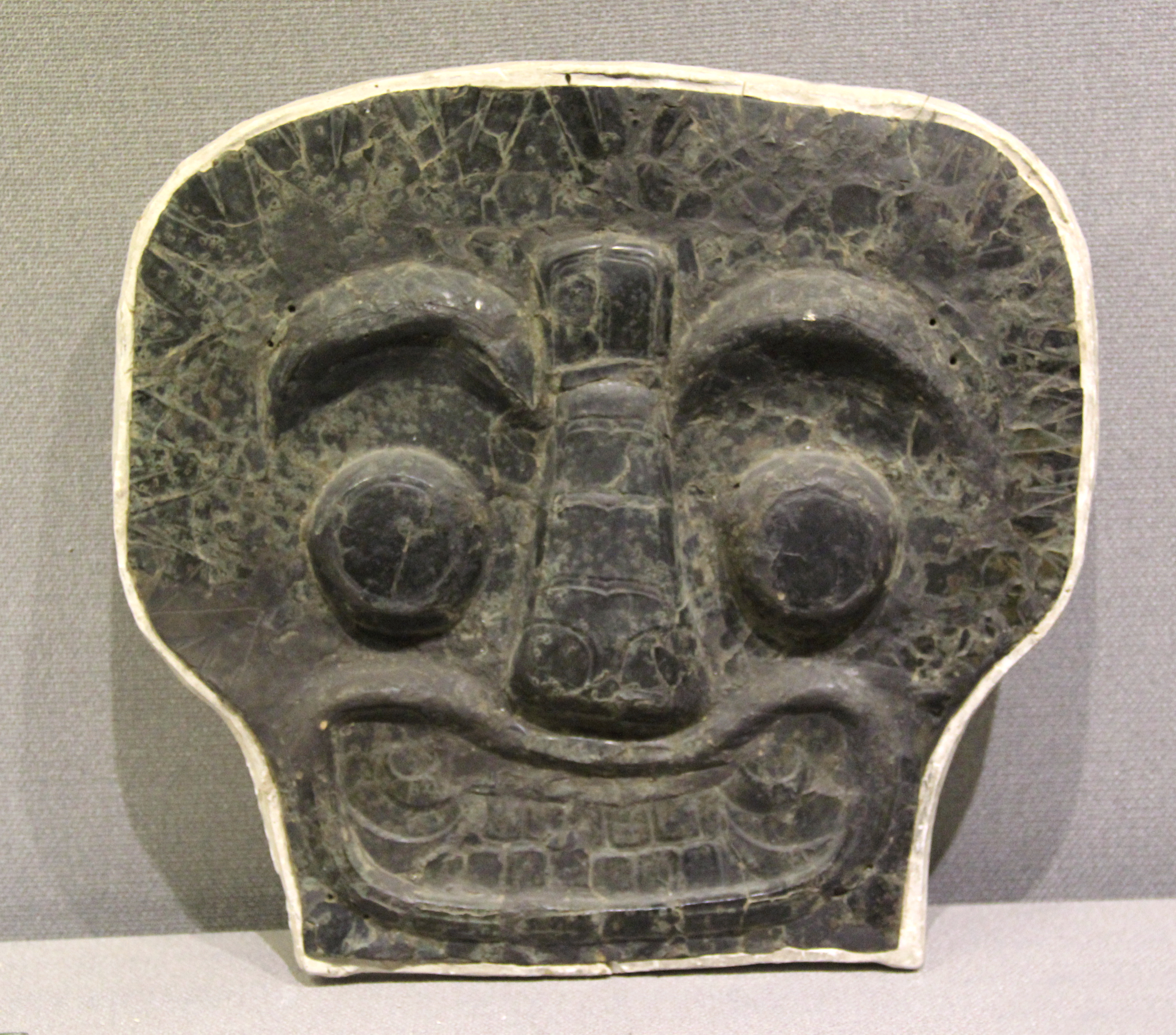
Western Zhou bronze armor decoration

The Xianyun attacked again in 823 BC, the fifth year of reign of King Xuan. Some scholars (e.g. Jaroslav Průšek) suggest that their military tactics characterized by sudden attacks could only have been carried out by highly mobile troops, most likely on horseback and relate the appearance of the Xianyun to migrations from the Altai region in Chinese or, more specifically, the appearance of Scythians and Cimmerians migrating from the west. However, there is no definite evidence that the Xianyun were nomadic warriors; moreover, a Duo You bronze ding vessel inscription unearthed in 1980 near Xi'an tells that c. 816 BC Xianyun forces attacked a Jing (京) garrison in the lower Ordos region, drawing a Zhou military response. It indicated that like the Zhou, the Xianyun fought on horse-drawn chariots; contemporary evidence does not indicate that the increased mobility of the Xianyun is related to the emergence of mounted nomads armed with bows and arrows.

Due to pressure from the Xianyun or the Quanrong, the Western Zhou dynasty collapsed in 771 BC and had to withdraw from the Wei River valley (Guanzhong), moving the capital away from Xi'an, to Luoyang about 300 km to the east.

=== Archaeological identification ===
General location of the Siwa, Deer stones and Upper Xiajiadian cultures, with contemporary Asian polities c. 1000 BC
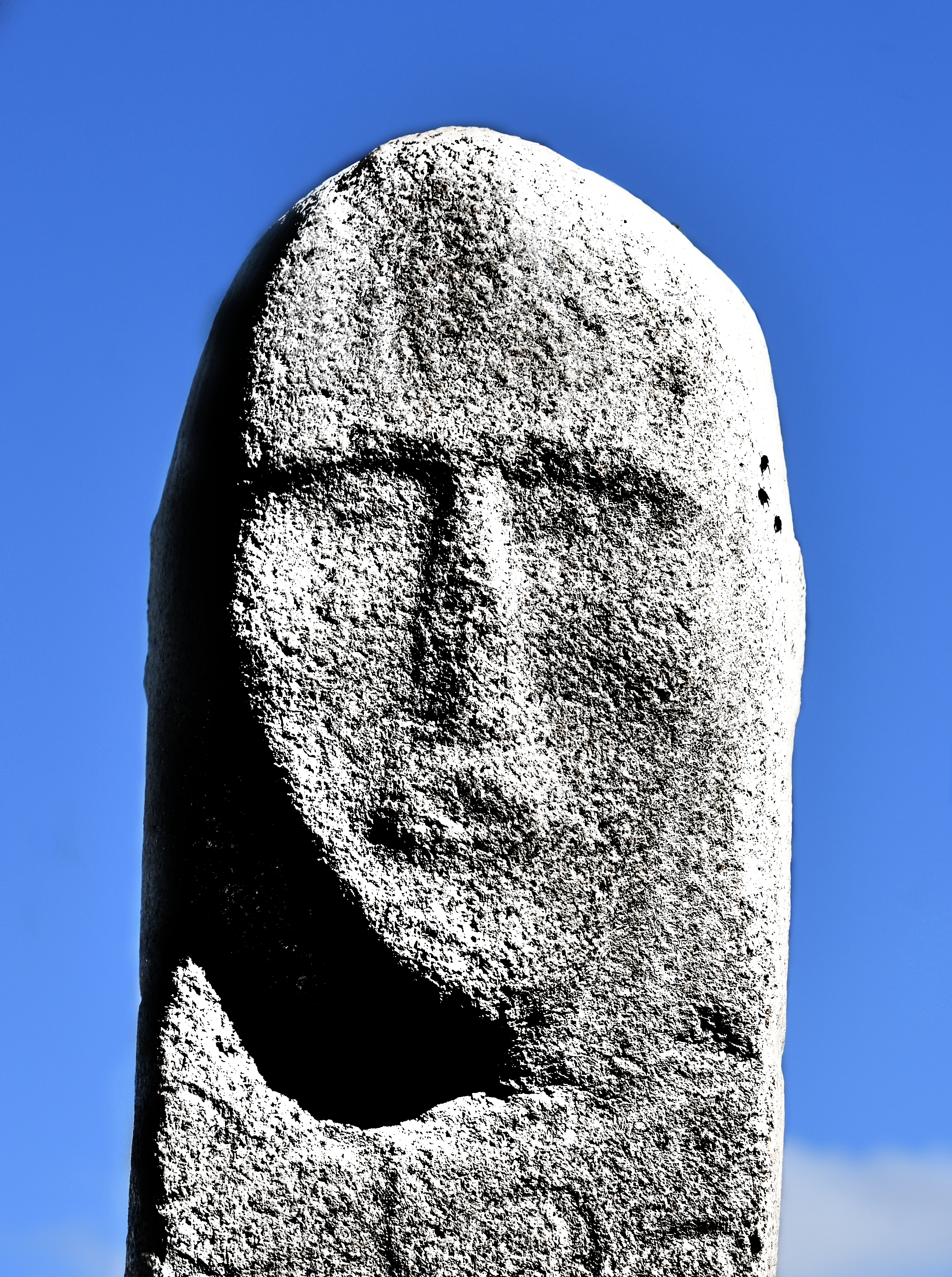
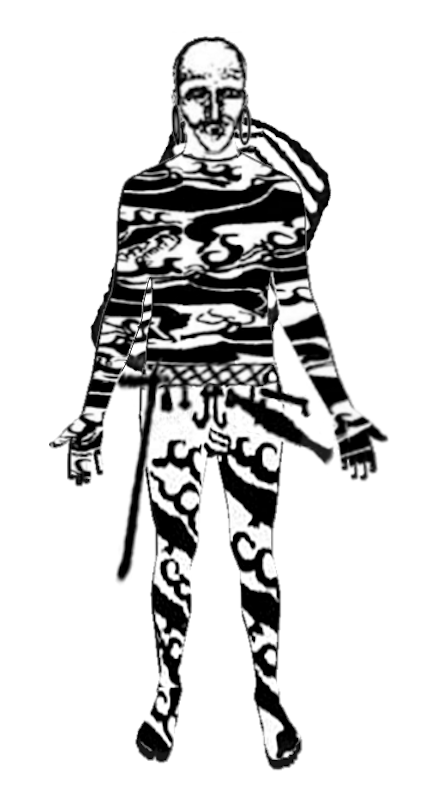
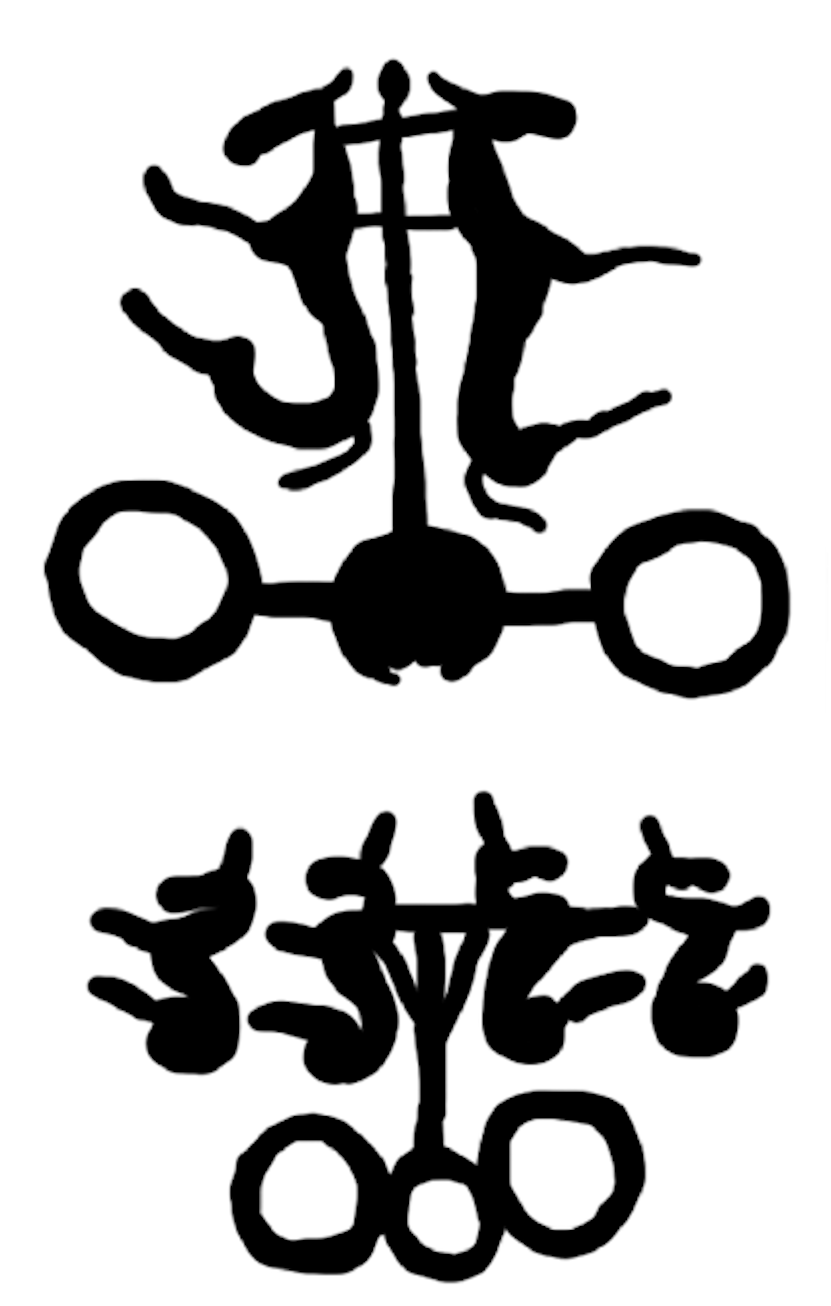
Nomadic leaders depicted in Deer stones in Mongolia (1400–700 BC), leading large-scale organized nomadic groups, may have affected the late Shang and early Zhou dynasties of China to their south. Their chariot technology may have stimulated the development of chariots in China.

==== Siwa culture (1300–600 BC) ====
The Xianyun may have been related to the archaeologically identified Siwa culture, but questions are raised against this theory because the Siwa sites are small with low subsistence levels, whereas the Xianyun seem to have been more advanced. According to Feng Li, these could not have sustained an advanced society like the Xianyun. The debate remains open.

From the 7th century BC, the Siwa culture was followed by the appearance of Eurasian steppe cultures, particularly the Scythic Ordos culture, which again interacted in various ways with the Central Plains of China.

==== Deer stones culture (1400–700 BC) ====
The nomadic leaders depicted in Deer stones in Mongolia, dated to 1400–700 BCE, leading large-scale organized nomadic groups, may have affected the late Shang and early Zhou dynasties of China to their south. They were equipped with weapons and instruments of war, such as daggers, shafted axes, or curved rein holders for their horses. These powerful nomadic leaders, leading large-scale organized nomadic groups capable of building monumental decorated stone tombs, may have being part of the nomadic challenge to the early Chinese dynasties.

==== Upper Xiajiadian culture (1000–600 BC) ====
The Upper Xiajiadian culture was a Bronze Age archaeological culture in Northeast China derived from the Eurasian steppe bronze tradition. It is associated with the Donghu ("Eastern Barbarians") of Chinese history.

== Later accounts ==
Later Chinese annals contain a number of references to the Xianyun, such as by Sima Qian (c. 145/135 – 86 BC), Ying Shao (140–206 AD), Wei Zhao (204–273), and Jin Zhuo (late 3rd–4th century AD). They stated that Xunyu (獯鬻) or Xianyun were terms that designated nomadic people who later during the Han dynasty were transcribed as "Xiongnu" (匈奴). This view was also held by the Tang dynasty commentator Sima Zhen (c. 8th century). Wang Guowei (1877–1927), as a result of phonetical studies and comparisons based on the inscriptions on bronze and the structure of the characters, came to the conclusion that the tribal names "Guifang" (鬼方), "Xunyu" (獯鬻), "Xianyu" (鮮虞), "Xianyun", "Rong" (戎), "Di" (狄), and "Hu" (胡) given in the annals designated one and the same people, who later entered history under the name Xiongnu.

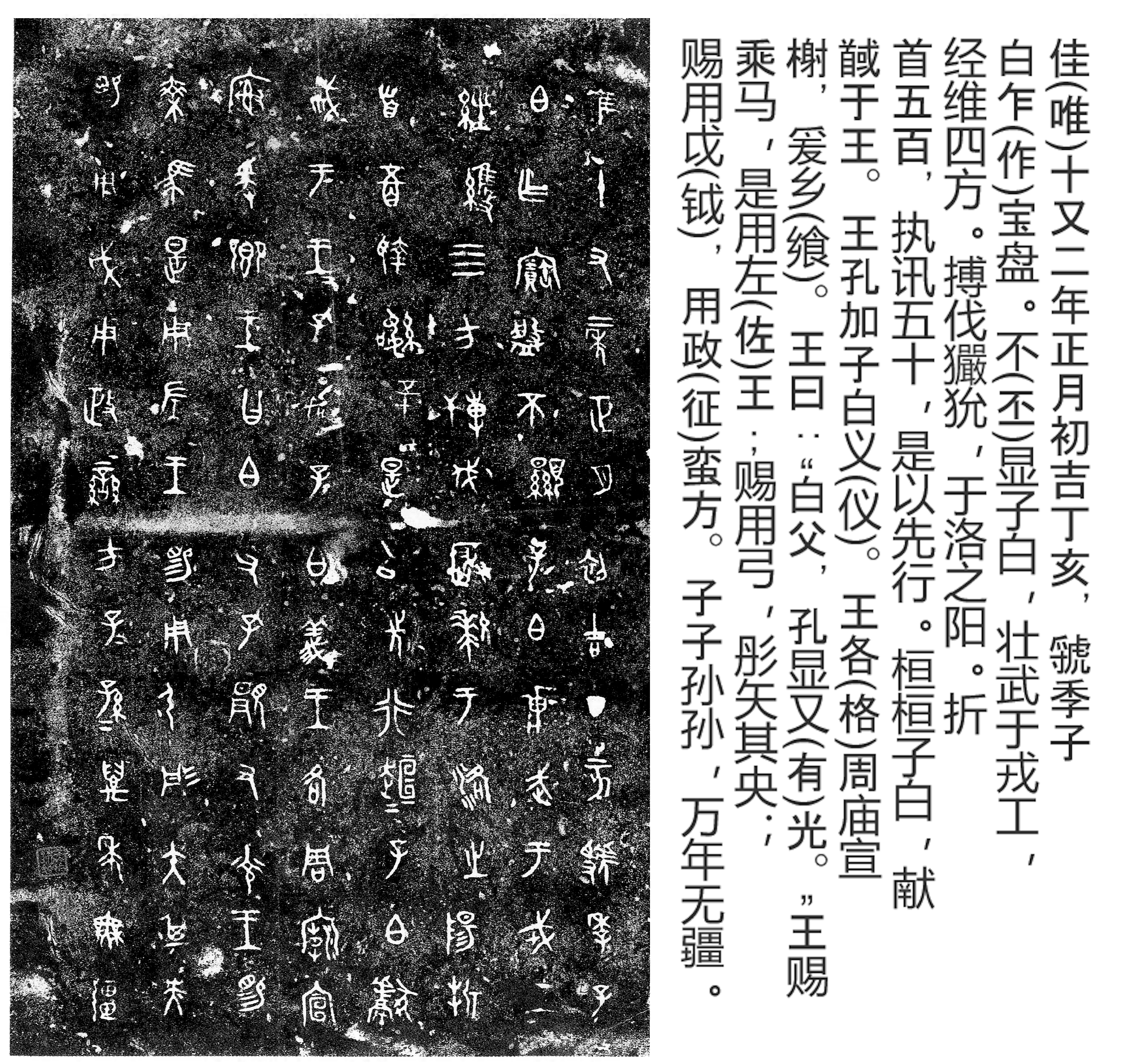
The Guoji Zibai pan (816 BC) records a Chinese expedition north of the Luo River, the killing of 500 Xianyun, and the taking of 50 prisoners.

The exact time period when the nomads' ethnonym had the Old Chinese phonetizations ancestral to standard Chinese Xianyun remains determined only vaguely. Using the Bronze Inscriptions and Classic of Poetry, Sinologist Axel Schuessler posited the date of 780 BC.

Using Sima Qian's Shiji and other sources, Vsevolod Taskin concludes that in the earlier pre-historic period (during the time of legendary Yellow Emperor) the Xiongnu were called 葷粥 Hunyu, in the late pre-historic period (during the time of legendary Emperor Yao and Emperor Shun) they were called 戎 Rong, in the literate period starting with the Shang dynasty (1600–1046 BC) they were called 鬼方 Guifang, in the Zhou period (1045–256 BC) they were called 獫狁 Xianyun, starting from the Qin period (221–206 BC) the Chinese annalists called them 匈奴 Xiongnu.

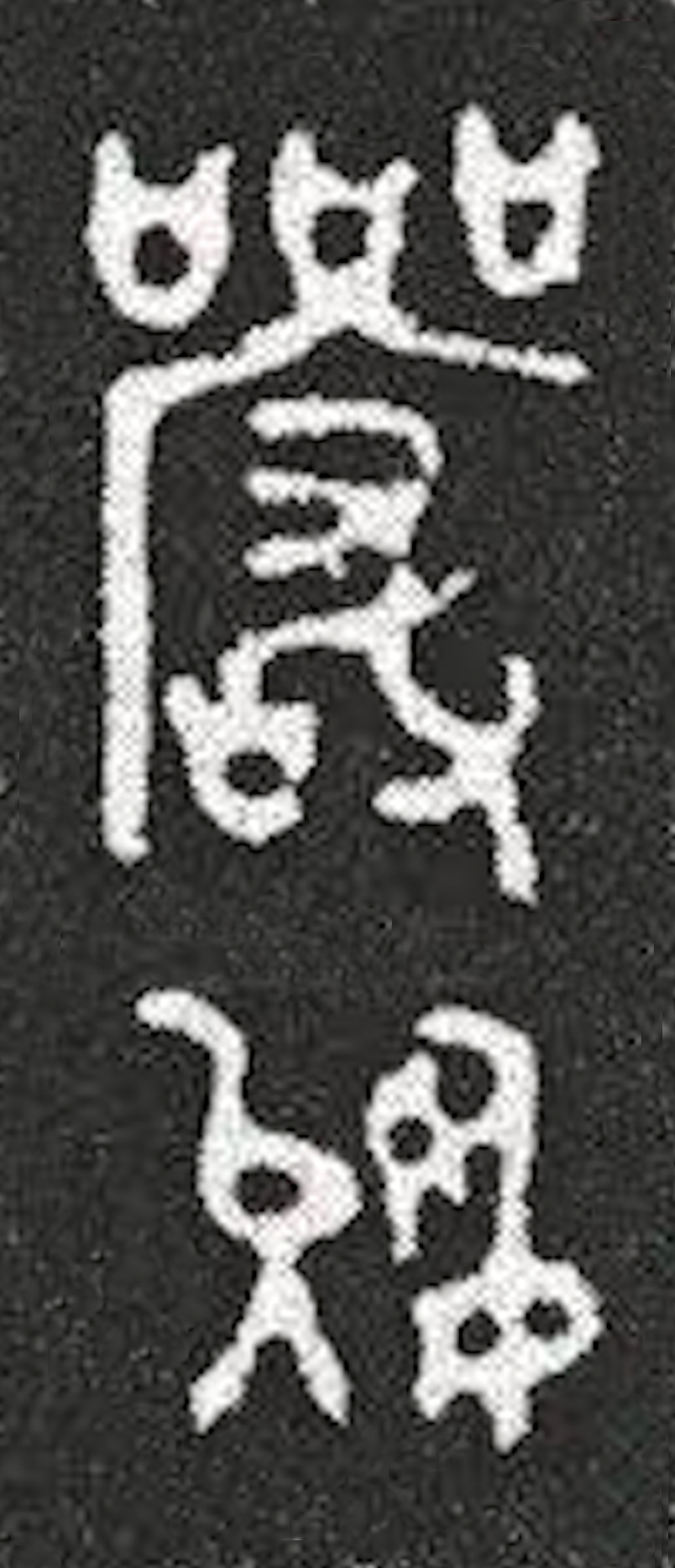
"Xianyun" in the Duo You ding, King Li period, 877–841 BC

Even so, Paul R. Goldin (2011) reconstructs the Old Chinese pronunciations of 葷粥 ~ 獯鬻 ~ 獯鬻 ~ 薰育 as *xur-luk, 獫狁 as hram′-lun′, and 匈奴 as *xoŋ-NA; and comments all three names are "manifestly unrelated". He further states that sound changes made the names more superficially similar than they really had been, and prompted later historians and commentators to conclude that those names must have referred to one same people in different epochs, even though people during the Warring States period would never have been thus misled.

Li Feng (2006) characterizes Wang Guowei's argument as "essentially deductive" and not based on solid evidence. Following Pulleyblank (1983), Li rejects the identification of the Xianyun with the Xiongnu, and only accepts identification of the Xianyun as one of the 戎 Rong "warlike foreigner" groups. Li proposes that the Xianyun:

- were indigenous hunters, farmers, and pastoralists living in widely distributed communities in the "Northern Zone Complex" in the region stretching from the Yellow River's Ordos Loop to its upper reaches;
- were possibly cultural successors to the Ordos culture (fl. 6th to 2nd centuries BC; from late Shang to early Western Zhou), with pastoralism gradually becoming dominant; and
- the Xianyun society boasted "a considerable size and high concentration of power", allowing them to field hundreds of chariots against the Zhou.

Further, Li suggests that the Xianyun and Quanrong were either closely related or the term Quanrong was invented during Eastern Zhou period to denote the Xianyun. Li points to evidence from the Western Zhou bronze inscriptions, the Classic of Poetry, Guoyu, the Bamboo Annals, and that when the name Xianyun became written graphically pejorative as 獫狁 with the 犭"dog" radical, the character 獫's notion of dog (Note: 獫 denoted a long-snouted dog according to the poem Si Tie (駟驖), Erya & Shuowen Jiezi) motivated the coining of Quanrong (犬戎; lit. "Dog Barbarians").

== Epigraphy ==
Comments about the conflicts against the Xianyun appears in several poems and bronze inscriptions of the Western Zhou.

Western Zhou Xianyun inscriptions
Name	Artifact	Transliteration	"Xianyun"	Translation
Gathering Millet (Caiqi) 采芑; Song 178, verse 4	Poem from The Book of Songs (Shi Jing 詩經)	蠢爾蠻荊 大邦為讎 方叔元老 克壯其猶 方叔率止 執訊獲醜 戎車嘽嘽 嘽嘽焞焞 如霆如雷 顯允方叔 征伐獫狁 蠻荊來威		How foolish were those savage tribes To make an enemy of the great state! Fangshu the Great Marshall; Laid mighty plans, Led his army forth. He captured prisoners for questioning. Many were his war chariots, Many and ample. Like claps of thunder they rumbled. Illustrious was Fangshu, he was true, He smote the Xianyun barbarians, He over-awed the tribes of Jing.
Duo You ding 多友鼎 840 BC				It was in the tenth month, because the Xianyun greatly arose and broadly attacked Jingshi, [it] was reported to the king. The king commanded Duke Wu: “Dispatch your most capable men and pursue at Jingshi!” Duke Wu commanded Duoyou: “Lead the ducal chariots and pursue at Jingshi!” On the guiwei (no. 20) day, the Rong attacked Xun and took captives. Duoyou pursued to the west. In the morning of the jiashen (no. 21) day, [he] struck [them] at Qi. Duoyou had cut off heads and captured prisoners to be interrogated: in all, using the ducal chariots to cut off 2[X]5 heads, to capture 23 prisoners, and to take 117 Rong chariots; [Duoyou] liberated the Xun people captured [by the Xianyun]. Furthermore, [Duoyou] struck at Gong; [he] cut off 36 heads and captured 2 prisoners and took 10 chariots. Following [the Xianyun], [Duoyou] pursued and struck at Shi; Duoyou again had cut off heads and taken prisoners. Thereafter, [Duoyou] rapidly pursued [them] and arrived at Yangzhong; the ducal chariotry cut off 115 heads and captured 3 prisoners. It was that [they] could not capture the [Rong] chariots; they burnt [them]. And it was their (the Xianyun's) horses that they wounded gravely. [Duoyou] recaptured the Jingshi captives.
Guoji Zibai pan 虢季子白盘 816 BC				On the Dinghai day during the auspicious first month of the twelfth year, Guo Jizibai made the treasure plate. The illustrious Zibai was brave and accomplished in military operations and managed the world. They attacked and conquered the Xianyun and reached the north of Luoshui. He beheaded 500 enemies, captured 50 prisoners, and became the vanguard of the entire army. The mighty Zibai cut off his enemy's left ear and presented it to the king. The king greatly appreciated Zibai's majesty. The king came to Xuanxie in the Ancestral Temple of Chengzhou and held a banquet for all the ministers. The king said: "Father Bai, your merits are outstanding and extremely glorious." The king gave Zibai a chariot with four horses to assist the king. He gave him a scarlet bow and arrows, a very bright color. He was given a big ax to use to conquer the barbarians. (Zibai made the utensil to make it useful for generations to come).
Buqi gui (JC: 4329) 815 BC				It was the ninth month, first auspiciousness, wushen-day (no. 45), Boshi said: “Buqi, the Border Protector! The Xianyun broadly attacked Xiyu, and the king commanded us to pursue to the west. I came back to send in the captives. I commanded you to defend and to pursue at Luo, and you used our chariots sweepingly attacking the Xianyun at Gaoyin; you cut off many heads and took many prisoners. The Rong greatly gathered and followed chasing you, and you and the Rong greatly slaughtered and fought. You have done well, and have not let our chariots get trapped in difficulty. You captured many, cutting off heads and taking prisoners.” Boshi said: “Buqi, you young man! You are nimble in warfare; [I] award you one bow, a bunch of arrows, five households of servants, ten fields of land, with which [you are] to take up your affairs.” Buqi bowed with [his] head touching the ground, [and extols] the beneficence. [Buqi] herewith makes for my august grandfather Gongbo and Mengji [this] sacrificial gui-vessel, with which to entreat much good fortune, longevity without limits, and eternal pureness without end. May [my] sons’ sons and grandsons’ grandsons eternally treasure and use [it] in offerings.

== See also ==
- Ethnic groups in Chinese history
- Xirong
- Guifang
- Xunyu
- Xiongnu
