= Guzhu =

Guzhu 孤竹
- c. 1600 BC–660 BC
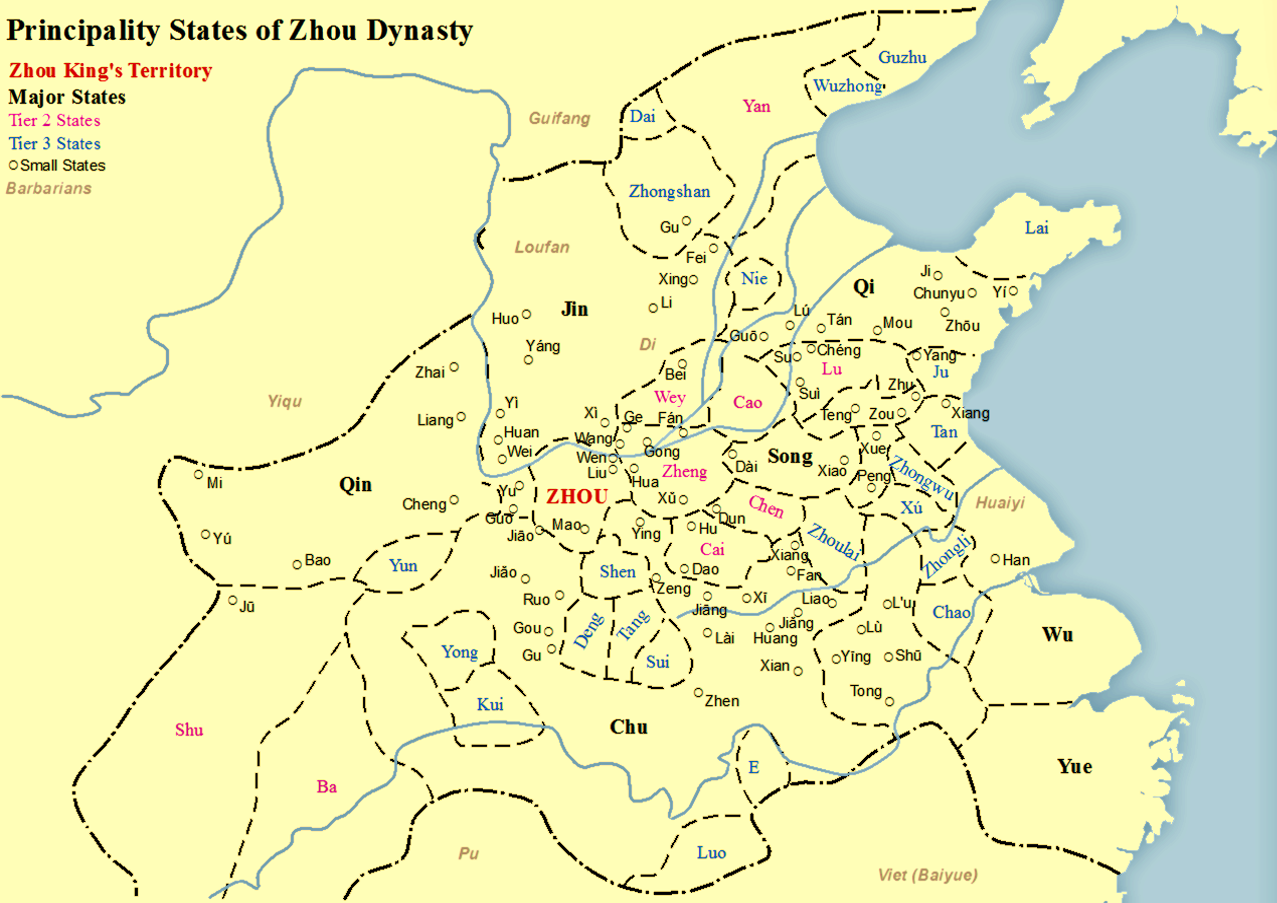
- Map of states in Zhou dynasty. Guzhu is in the northeast.
- Government: Monarchy
- History
  - Established: c. 1600 BC
  - Conquered by Yan: 660 BC
Preceded by	Succeeded by
Shang dynasty	Yan (state)

Guzhu (Chinese: 孤竹; pinyin: Gūzhú) was a vassal state of the Shang and Zhou dynasties located in the vicinity of modern Tangshan, Hebei province. It was a Dongyi state and had close relations with King Tang of Shang whom they share the same clan name Zi. During the Western Zhou dynasty, the Lichi and Shanrong tribes rose up in the north-west and north-east respectively, causing concerns to Guzhu's southern neighbors, the states of Qi and Yan. In 664 BC, the monarch of an already-weakened Guzhu was killed by a Qi-Yan coalition during an expedition against the Shanrong. Finally, in 660 BC, Qi and Yan annexed Guzhu.

== Guzhu rulers ==
Posthumous name	Name	Period as leader
Six former kings unclear
Fu Ding (父丁)	Motai Zhuyou (墨胎竹猷)	
Ya Wei (亞微)	Motai Chu (墨胎初)	
Ya Ping (亞憑)	Motai Feng (墨胎馮)	
Later kings cannot be confirmed

== See also ==
- Boyi and Shuqi
- Zhongshan (state)
- Shanrong
