= Guifang =

Historical people of China

Guifang
鬼方

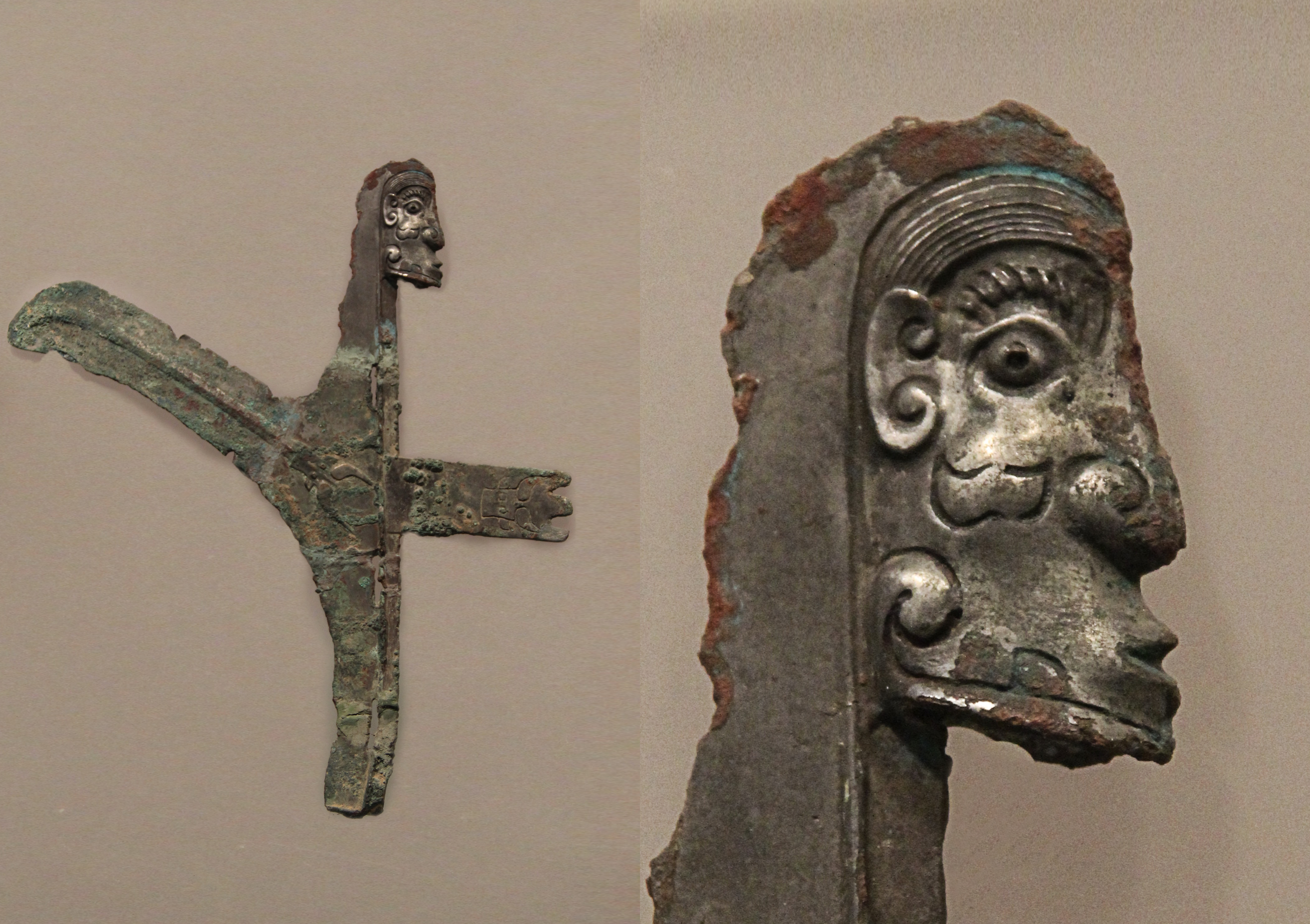
Anthropomorphic axe, bronze, excavated in the tomb of Heibo (潶伯), a military noble in charge of protecting the northern frontier, at Baicaopo, Lingtai County, Western Zhou period (1045–771 BCE). Gansu Museum. This is considered as a possible Chinese depiction of a Xianyun or Guifang.

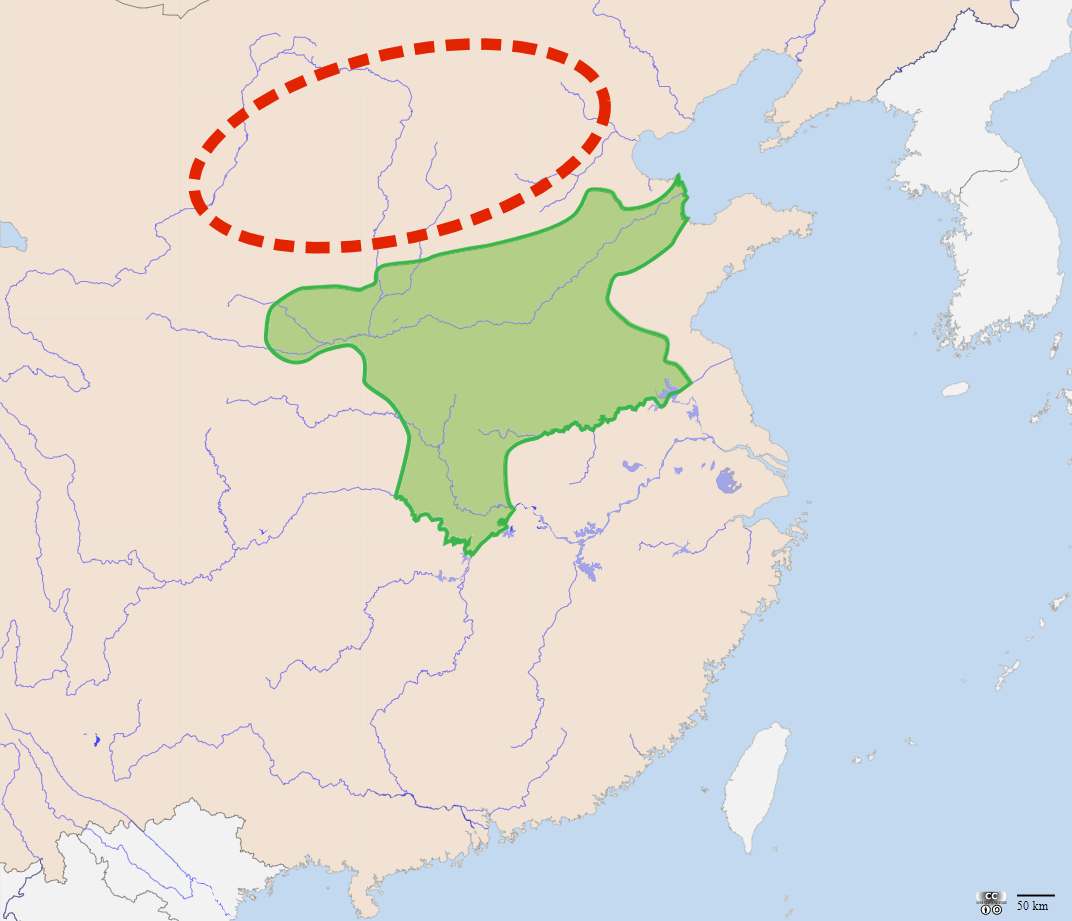
Respective areas of the Shang ( ) and Guifang

Guifang (Chinese: 鬼方; Wade–Giles: Kuei-fang; lit. 'Demon Territory') was an ancient ethnonym for a northern people that fought against the Shang dynasty (1600–1046 BCE). Chinese historical tradition used various names in different periods for northern tribes such as the Guifang, Rong, Di, Xunyu, Xianyun, or Xiongnu peoples. This Chinese exonym combines gui (鬼 "ghost, spirit, devil") and fang (方 "side, border, country, region"), a suffix referring to "non-Shang or enemy countries that existed in and beyond the borders of the Shang polity."

== Overview ==
Chinese annals contain a number of references to the Guifang. The earliest sources mentioning the Guifang are the Oracle Bones. Extant oracle bones record no military action between Shang and Guifang; the Guifang have been interpreted as hostile toward the Shang as well not hostile. (Note: Anderson (2015) interprets oracle bone inscriptions wherein the Shang divined about whether disasters would happen to Guifang Tang (鬼方昜) (either a Guifang person named Tang or the polities named Guifang and Tang) as possible proofs for the viewpoint that Guifang were not hostile; even so, Anderson admits that " the context is too limited and incomplete for this to serve as solid evidence". Yu (2000) interprets the same inscriptions as the Shang's wish that disasters would happen to the Guifang & other hostile polities.)

The Bamboo Annals, interred with King Xiang of Wei (died 296 BC) and re-discovered nearly six centuries later in 281 AD (Western Jin dynasty) in the Jizhong discovery, state that:

- In the thirty-second year of Shang King Wu Ding (fl. 1200s BCE), he attacked the Guifang, and stationed at Jing (荊); (Note: Identified as either Jing Canyon (井經) north of Taihang Mountains and near Heng Mountains, "about 500 km from Wu Ding’s capital at Anyang" or in the same location as the polity Jingfang (井方) and the Ji-surnamed Xing state (邢國) "on the Huabei 華北 Plain near present-day Xingtai 邢臺 in the southern part of Hebei province, only 125 km north of Anyang") and in the thirty-fourth year, after a campaign of three years, the King's armies subdued the Guifang, and the Di and Qiang came as guests. Wu Ding's conquests against the Guifang are also mentioned in the Yi Jing "Book of Changes".

The oracle bones indicate that, following Wu Ding's conquest, the Guifang became Shang's subjects and even assisted the Shang against other polities, e.g. the Qiang. Gui officials even managed to achieve high statuses in the Shang court; for examples, a Gui official, Geng, was ordered to perform the gang sacrifice 剛 in the xiang 亯 sacrificial temple.

- In the thirty-fifth year of the Shang King Wu Yi (i.e. 1119 BCE), Zhou leader Jili attacked the Gǔiróng (Chinese: 鬼戎) in Xiluo (西落) and captured twenty Dí kings. Historians believe that the Guirong were identical to the Guifang.

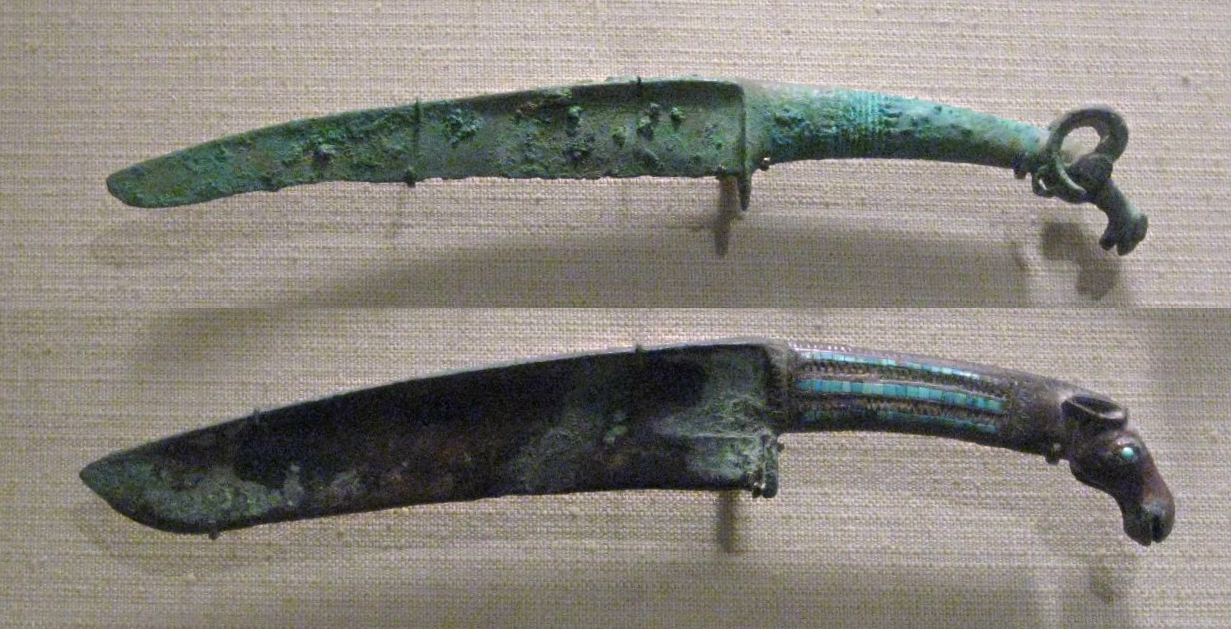
Shang dynasty curved bronze knives with turquoise inlays and animal pommel. 12th-11th century BCE. Such knives may be the result of contacts with northern people.

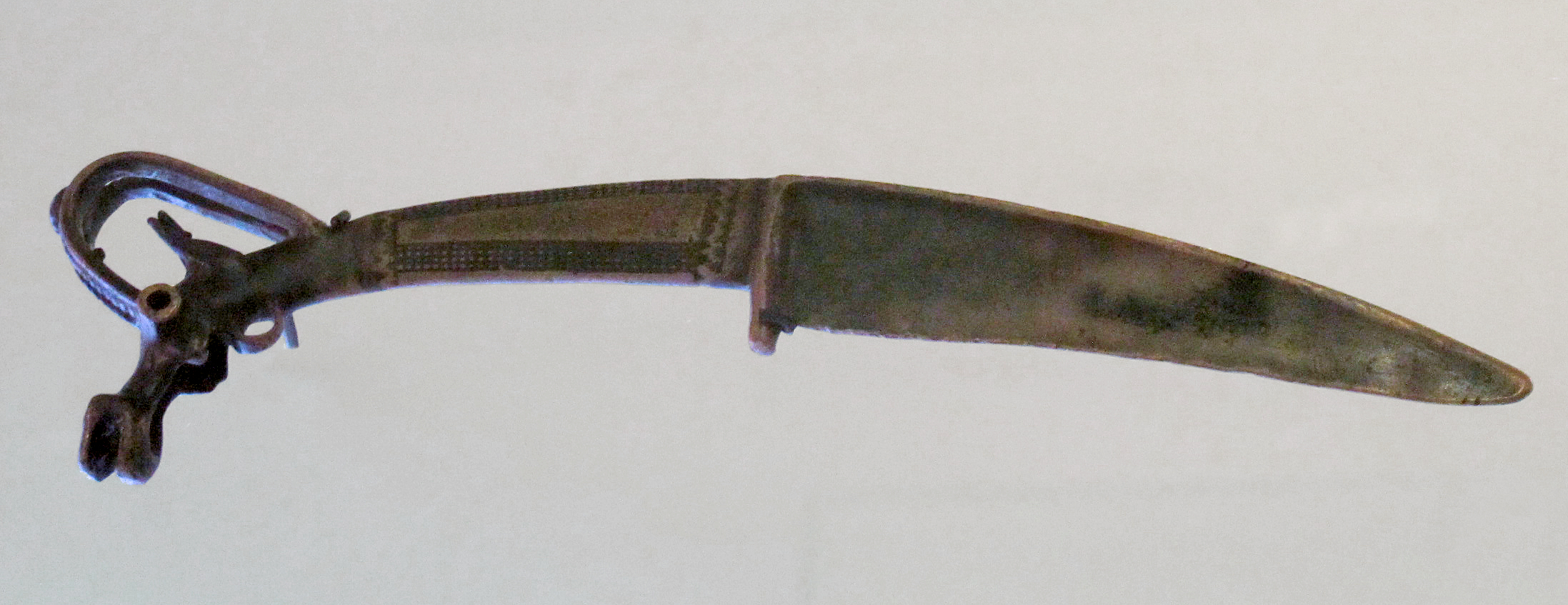
Shang dynasty Bronze ibex-headed knife with ring, 13th-11th century BCE. These weapons, already found in the tomb of Fu Hao at the time of the Shang Emperor Wu Ding (died c. 1190 BCE), are similar to those of the steppes.

Up to the time of Shang king Di Xin, Gui chiefs had been long-enfeoffed vassals of Shang and even participated in the Shang royal government. In Stratagem of the Warring States, Lu Zhonglian (魯仲連) related that the Marquis of Gui (鬼侯) ranked among Di Xin's Three Ducal Ministers (along with the Marquis of E (鄂侯) and the Western Count [Ji] Chang (西伯昌) (Note: aka King Wen of Zhōu (周文王))) and married his beloved daughter to Di Xin. However, Di Xin considered her detestably ugly (惡), so he killed her and boiled alive the Marquis of Gui; the Marquis of E sharply criticized Di Xin and was butchered. A parallel account in Shiji features the Marquis of Jiu (九侯), his daughter (九侯女), and the Marquis of E (鄂侯); the Marquis of Jiu was identified with the Marquis of Gui. (Note: The Bamboo Annals' "current text" version (今本) also mentions Marquis of Jiu instead of Marquis of Gui.) Another parallel account in Taiping Yulan states the Marquis of Gui's daughter disapproved of Di Xin's debaucheries, so Di Xin killed her and her father, and Di Xin had the Marquis of Xing butchered rather than the Marquis of E. (Note: Yuanhe Maps and Records of Prefectures and Counties also mentions that "Marquis of Xing had been [one of] King Zhòu's Three Ducal Ministers; because he'd loyally admonished [King Zhòu] he was executed",)

Among the succeeding Zhou dynasty's bronze inscriptions, the Xiao Yu Ding (小盂鼎) –cast in the twenty-fifth year (976 BCE) of King Kang of Zhou (r. 1005/03–978 BCE)– mentioned the Guifang, probably located northeast of the initial Zhou domain. After two successful battles against the Guifang, the Zhou victors brought their captured enemies to the Zhou temple and offered them to the king. The prisoners numbered over 13,000, with four chiefs who were subsequently executed. In this campaign, Zhou also seized a large amount of valuable goods.

No events involving the Guifang are reported after 650 BCE, which is also the last mention of the Northern Rong (北戎). They were replaced by a new group of Northern foreigners, the Di (狄).

=== Interpretations ===
As a result of phonetic studies and comparisons based on the inscriptions on bronze and the structure of the characters, Wang Guowei came to the conclusion that the tribal names in the annalistic sources Guifang, Xunyu, Xianyu, Xianyun, Rong, Di, (Note: Specifically, Wang connected the 鬼方 Guifang with the leaders of the Red Di (赤狄, Chidi) who were surnamed 隗 ~ 媿 Kuí, a connection also later noticed by Sinologist Ulrich Theobald.) and Hu designated one and the same people, who later entered history under the name Xiongnu.

Likewise, using Sima Qian's Records of the Grand Historian and other sources, Vsevolod Taskin proposes that in the earlier pre-historic period (i.e. the time of the legendary Yellow Emperor) the Xiongnu were called Hunyu; and in the late pre-historic period (i.e. the time of the legendary Emperor Yao and Emperor Shun) they were called Rong; in the literate period starting with the Shang dynasty (1600–1046 BC) they were called Guifang, in the Zhou period (1045–256 BC) they were called Xianyun, and starting from the Qin period (221–206 BC) the Chinese annalists called them Xiongnu.

Even so, Paul R. Goldin (2011) reconstructs the Old Chinese pronunciations of 葷粥 ~ 獯鬻 ~ 獯粥 ~ 薰育 as *xur-luk, 獫狁 as hram′-lun′, and 匈奴 as *xoŋ-NA; and comments all three names are "manifestly unrelated". He further states that sound changes made the names more superficially similar than they really had been, and prompted later commentators to conclude that those names must have referred to the same people in different epochs, even though people during the Warring States period would never have been thus misled.

=== Other fang-countries ===
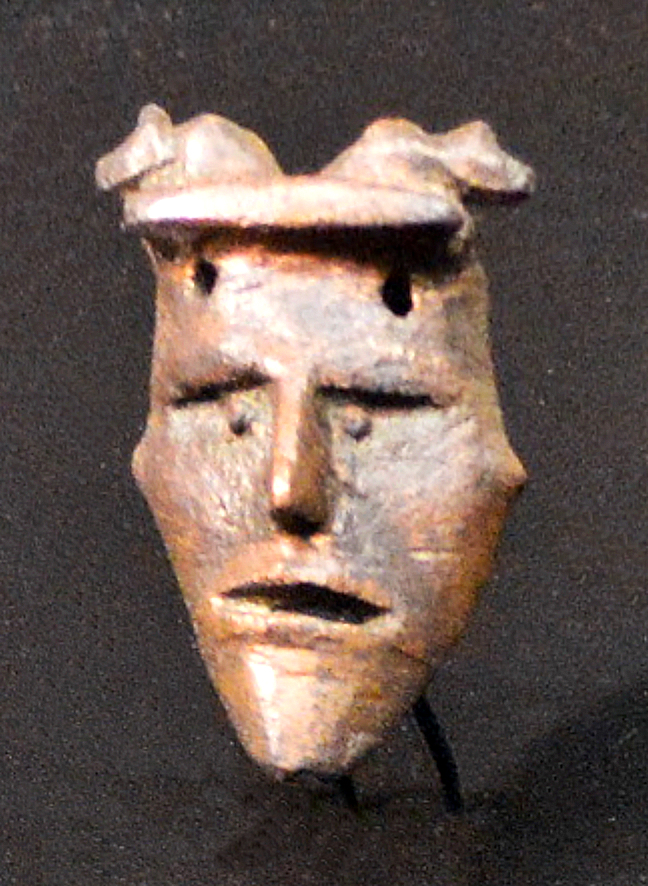
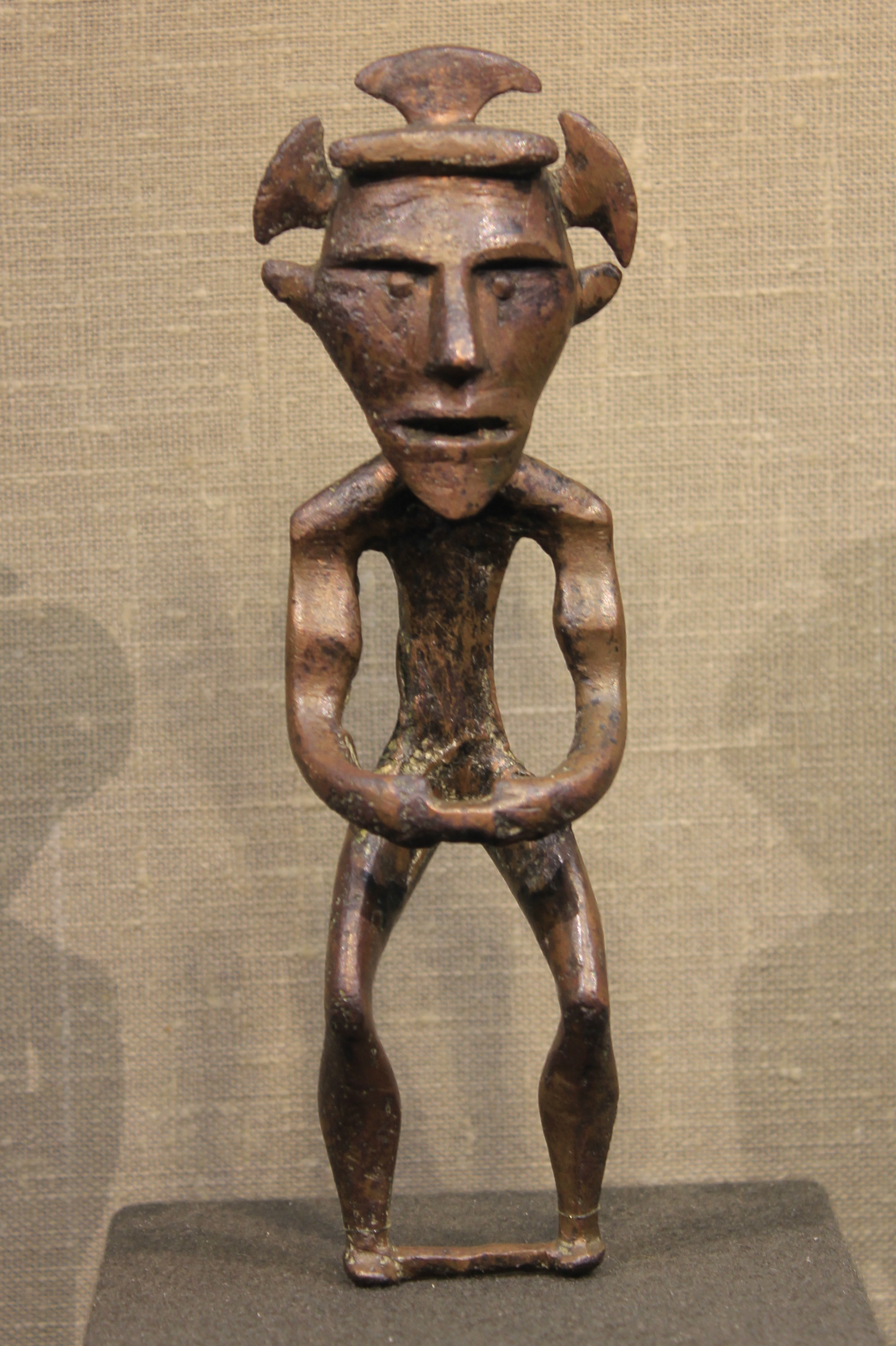
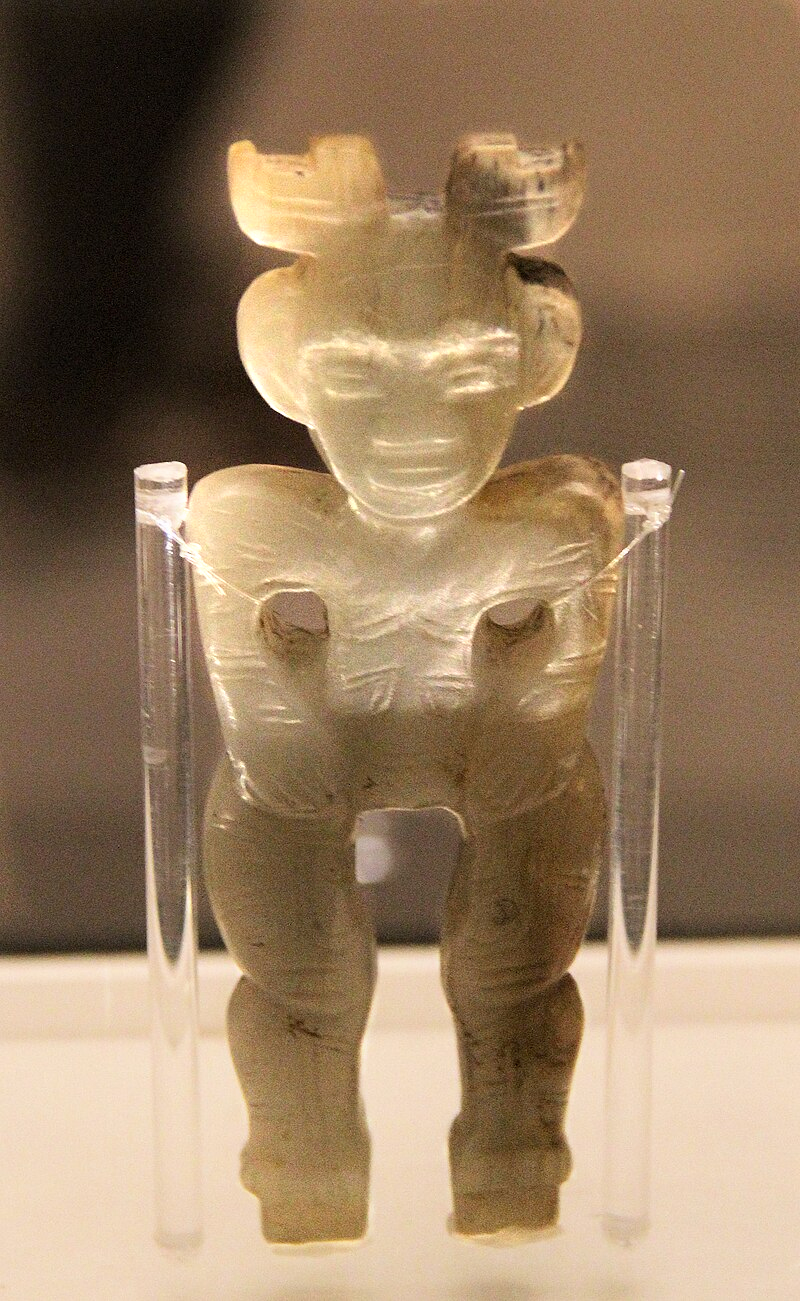
Left and center: Seima-Turbino bronze figurines. Right: possible Chinese jade adaptation (tomb of Fu Hao).

The Shang state had a system of writing attested to by bronze inscriptions and oracle bones, which record Shang troops fighting frequent wars with neighboring nomadic herdsmen from the inner Asian steppes. In his oracular divinations, a Shang king repeatedly showed concern about the fang (方, likely meaning "border-region"; the modern term for them is Fangguo 方国 fāngguó "fang-countries"), groups of barbarians outside his inner tu (土) regions in the center of Shang territory. A particularly hostile tribe, Tufang from the Yan Mountains region, is regularly mentioned in divinatory records. Another Chinese ethnonym for the animal husbandry nomads was ma (馬) or "horse" barbarians mentioned at the Shang western military frontier in the Taihang Mountains, where they fought and may have used chariots.

=== Seima-Turbino culture as "Guifang" ===
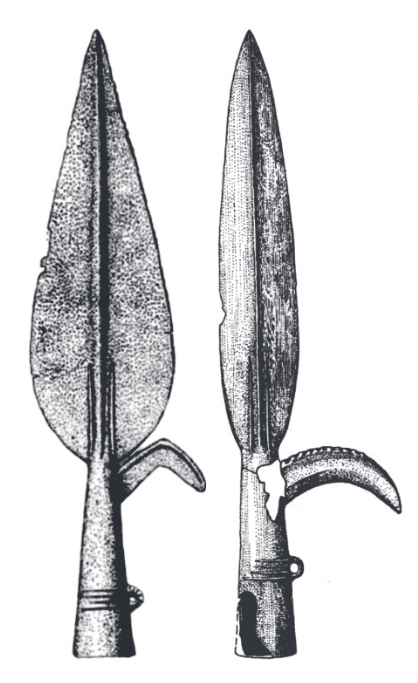
Seima-Turbino socketed spearheads with single side hook started to appear in China circa 2100 BCE

Several of the Shang dynasty artifacts of the Yin Ruins and from the tomb of Fu Hao (died c. 1200 BCE), excavated in Shang capital of Anyang, are similar to Seima-Turbino culture artifacts, such as socketed spearheads with a single side hook, jade figurines and knives with deer-headed pommel. These Late Shang artifacts, visibly derived from the Seima-Turbino culture to the north, were made precisely at the same time the Shang reported intense protracted conflicts with the northern tribes of the "Guifang". Their century-long conflict with the Shang led to the transfer of various object and manufacturing techniques.

Particularly, the introduction of the socketed spearheads with a single side hook seems to date back to the period of the Taosi culture, when the earliest and most faithful Seima-Turbino types start to appear in China, circa 2100-2000 BCE. These early artifacts suggest that Chinese bronze metallurgy initially derived from the cultures of the Eurasian steppes. Soon however, China was able to appropriate this technology and refine it, particularly through its mastery of bronze casting, to create a highly sophisticated and massive bronze industry.

=== Northern tribes in the Late Shang period ===
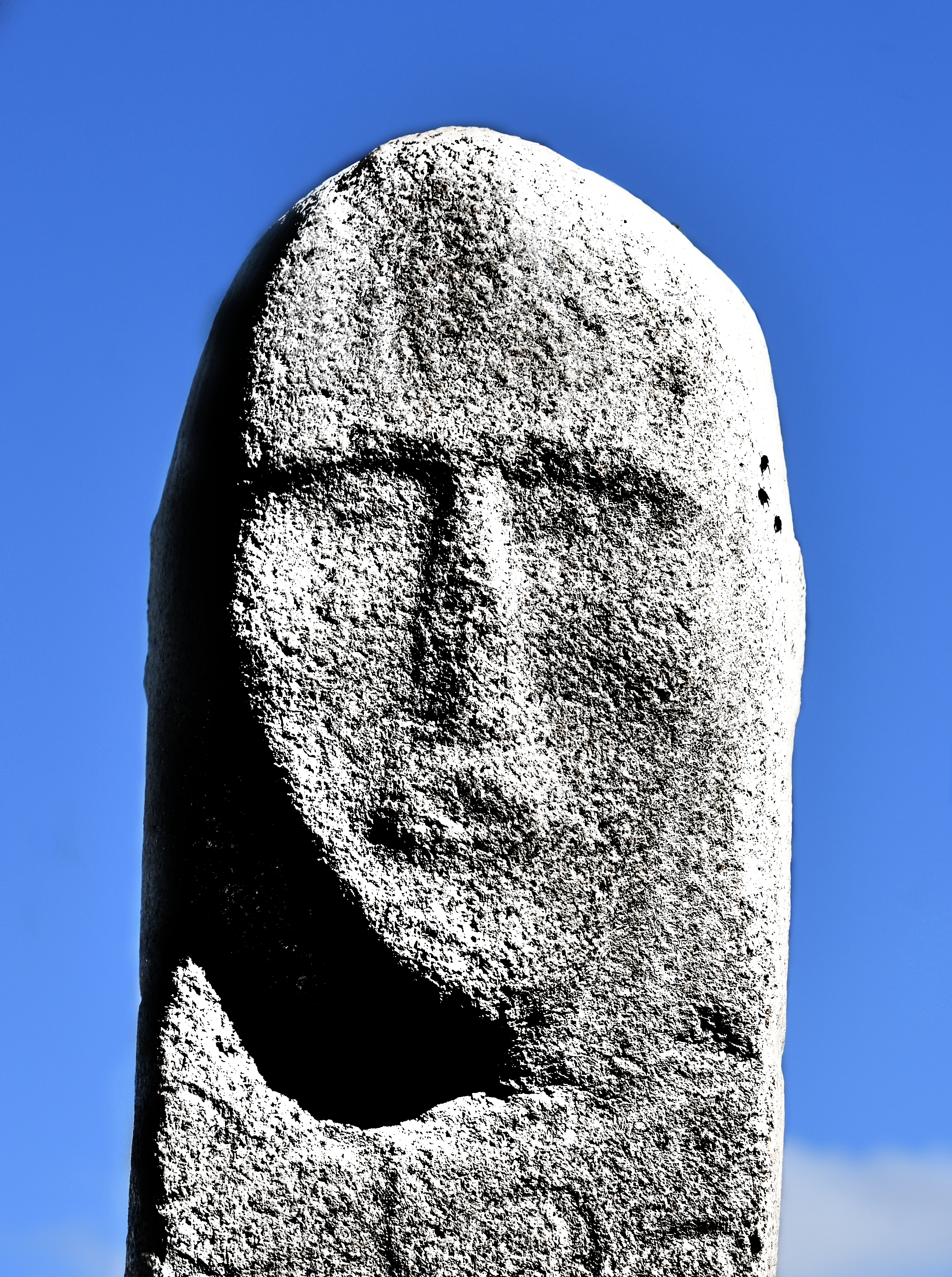
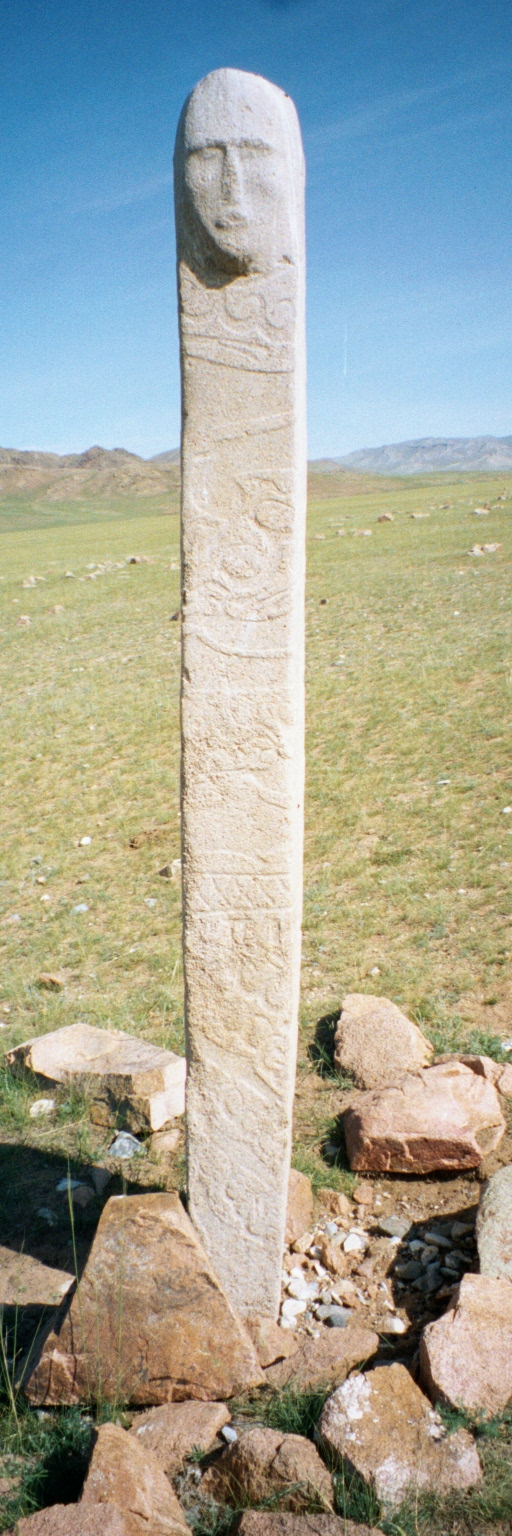
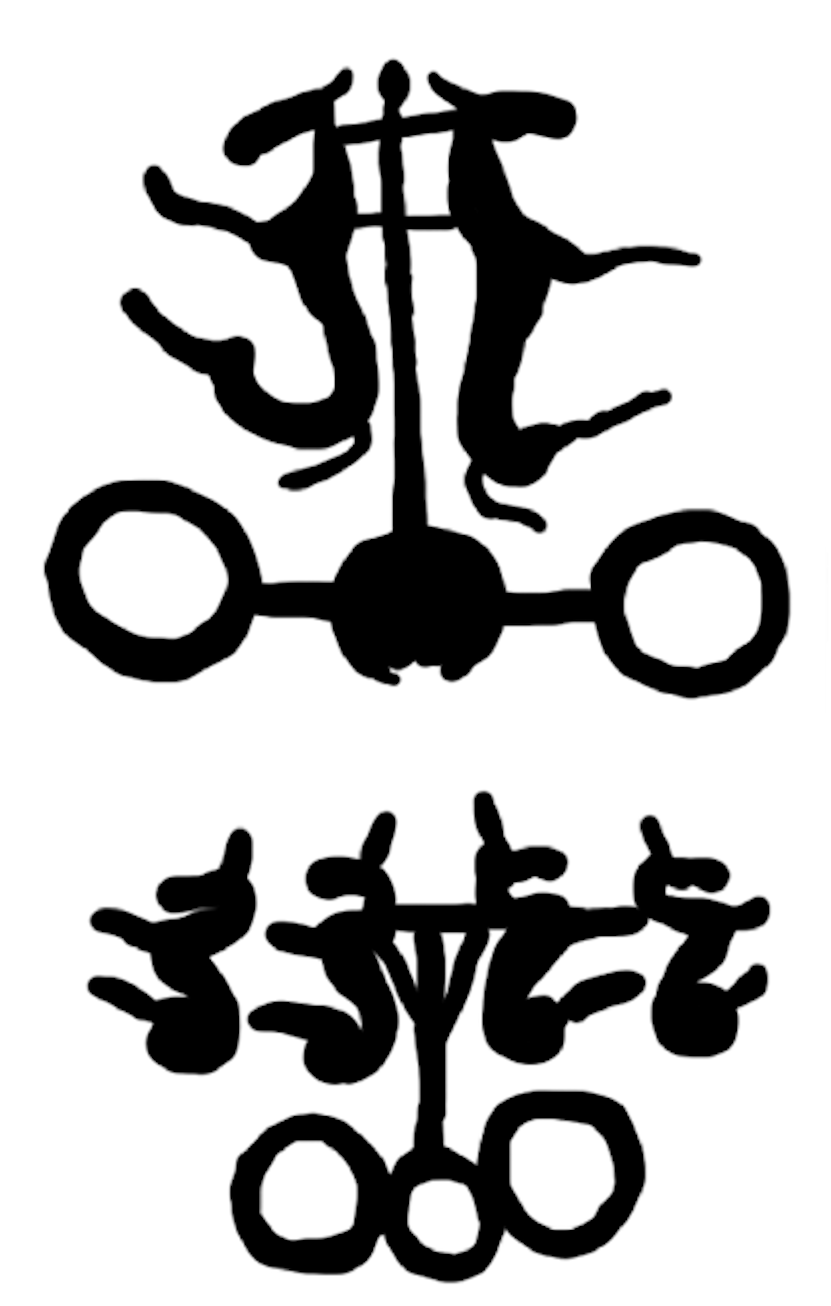
Nomadic leaders depicted in Deer stones in Mongolia (1400-700 BC), leading large-scale organized nomadic groups, may have affected the late Shang and early Zhou dynasties of China to their south. Their chariot technology may have stimulated the development of Shang chariots.

The nomadic leaders depicted in Deer stones in Mongolia, dated to 1400-700 BC, leading large-scale organized nomadic groups, may have affected the late Shang and early Zhou dynasties of China to their south.

They were equipped with weapons and instruments of war, such as daggers, shafted axes, or curved rein holders for their horses. They may not have ridden on horseback, but they are documented to have possessed horse-drawn charriots, with two or four horses, as shown in the drawings on Deer Stones and multiple finds of horse skeletons with heavy wear. These powerful nomadic leaders, leading large-scale organized nomadic groups capable of building monumental decorated stone tombs, may have been part of the nomadic challenge to the early Chinese dynasties. They may also be connected to the rise of the horse chariot during the Shang dynasty.

=== Siwa culture (1300–600 BCE) ===
The Siwa culture is sometimes proposed as being connected to the northern tribes which challenged the Shang and Zhou dynasties, but questions are raised against this theory because the Siwa sites are small with low subsistence levels, whereas the northern tribes, particularly the Xianyun, seem to have been more advanced, using bronze weapons and chariots. According to Feng Li, the archaeological remains of the Siwa culture suggest that they could not have sustained an advanced society capable of rivaling contemporary Chinese armies. The debate remains open.

== Epigraphy ==
Comments about the conflicts against the Guifang appear in bronze inscriptions of the Western Zhou.

Guifang inscriptions
Name	Artifact	Inscription	Translation
Xiaoyu ding 小盂鼎; 979 BCE (King Kang)	Lost in the Taiping Rebellion (19th century) The Xiaoyu ding was probably similar to the Da Yu ding made two years before, in 981 BCE:		"It was the eighth month, after the full moon, the day was on jiashen [day 21]; in the morning dusk, the three officials of the left and the three officials of the right and the many rulers entered to serve the wine. When it became light the king approached the Zhou temple and performed the guo-libation rite. The king's state guests attended. The state guests offered their travel garments and faced east." "Yu with many flags with suspended Guifang...entered the Southern Gate, and reported saying: 'The king commanded Yu to take... to attack the Guifang and shackle chiefs and take trophies. [I] shackled two chiefs, took 482 trophies, captured 13,081 men, captured...horses, captured 30 chariots, captured 355 oxen and 38 sheep.'" "The king called out to...to command Yu with his trophies to enter the gate and present them in the Western Passageway... [He] entered and performed a burnt offering in the Zhou temple,... [He] entered the Third Gate, assumed a position in the central court, facing north. Yu reported..." "The guests assumed position. [He] served the guests. The king called out: 'Serve!' Yu in their...presented guests... At mid-morning, three Zhou...entered to serve wine. The king entered the temple. The invocator...the state guests grandly toasted...used a victim in ancestral sacrifice to the king of Zhou [i.e. King Wen], to King [Wu] and to King Cheng...divination cracks have pattern. The king toasted. Toast followed toast: the king and the state guests. The king called out to...to command Yu with the booty to enter. All of the booty was registered."

== See also ==
- Ethnic groups in Chinese history
