= Graphic pejoratives in written Chinese =

Some historical Chinese characters for non-Han peoples were graphically pejorative ethnic slurs, where the racial insult derived not from the Chinese word but from the character used to write it. For instance, written Chinese first transcribed the name Yáo "the Yao people (in southwest China and Vietnam)" with the character for yáo 猺 "jackal". Most of those terms were replaced in the language reforms shortly after the establishment of the People's Republic; for example, the character for the term yáo was changed, replaced this graphic pejorative meaning "jackal" with another one – a homophone meaning yáo 瑤 "precious jade".

== Linguistic background ==
Graphic pejoratives are a unique aspect of Chinese characters. In alphabetically written languages such as English, orthography does not change ethnic slurs – but in logographically written languages like Chinese, it makes a difference whether one writes Yáo as 猺 "jackal" or with its homophone 瑤 "jade". Over 80% of Chinese characters are phono-semantic compounds, consisting of a radical or determinative giving the logographic character a semantic meaning and a "rebus" or phonetic component guiding the pronunciation. The American linguist James A. Matisoff coined the term "graphic pejoratives" in 1986, describing autonym and exonym usages in East Asian languages.

Human nature being what it is, exonyms are liable to be pejorative rather than complimentary, especially where there is a real or fancied difference in cultural level between the ingroup and outgroup. Sometimes the same pejorative exonym is applied to different peoples, providing clues to the inter-ethnic pecking-order in a certain region. ... the former Chinese name for the Jinghpaw, [Yěrén] 野人 lit. 'wild men', was used by both the Jinghpaw and the Burmese to refer to the Lisu. ... The Chinese writing system provided unique opportunities for graphic pejoratives. The 'beast-radical' 犭 used to appear in the characters for the names of lesser peoples (e.g., 猺 'Yao'), though now the 'person-radical' 亻 has been substituted (傜).

Disparaging characters for certain ethnic groups depend upon a subtle semantic aspect of transcription into Chinese characters. The Chinese language writes exonyms, like other foreign loanwords, in characters chosen to approximate the foreign pronunciation – but the characters themselves represent meaningful Chinese words. The sinologist Endymion Wilkinson says,

At the same time as finding characters to fit the sounds of a foreign word or name it is also possible to choose ones with a particular meaning, in the case of non-Han peoples and foreigners, usually a pejorative meaning. It was the practice, for example, to choose characters with an animal or reptile signific for southern non-Han peoples, and many northern peoples were given characters for their names with the dog or leather hides signific. In origin this practice may have derived from the animal totems or tribal emblems typical of these peoples. This is not to deny that in later Chinese history such graphic pejoratives fitted neatly with Han convictions of the superiority of their own culture as compared to the uncultivated, hence animal-like, savages and barbarians. Characters with animal hides, or other such significs were generally not used in formal correspondence. On and off they were banned by non-Han rulers in China culminating with the Qing. Many were systematically altered during the script reforms of the 1950s (Dádá 韃靼, 'Tatar', is one of the few, to have survived).

Wilkinson compared these "graphic pejoratives selected for aborigines and barbarians" with the "flattering characters chosen for transcribing the names of the Western powers in the nineteenth century", for instance, Měiguó 美國 "United States" can be read as "beautiful country".

The most common radical among graphic pejoratives is Radical 94 犬 or 犭, called the "dog" or "beast" radical, which is ordinarily used in characters for animal names (e.g., māo 猫 "cat", gǒu 狗 "dog", zhū 猪 "pig"), although the traditional characters for "cat" 貓 and "pig" 豬 use Radical 153 豸 "badger/animal" instead. Dutch historian Frank Dikötter explains the significance.

Physical composition and cultural disposition were confused in Chinese antiquity. The border between man and animal was blurred. "The Rong are birds and beasts" [Zuozhuan]. This was not simply a derogatory description: it was part of a mentality that integrated the concept of civilization with the idea of humanity, picturing the alien groups living outside the pale of Chinese society as distant savages hovering on the edge of bestiality. The names of the outgroups were written in characters with an animal radical, a habit that persisted until the 1930s: the Di, a northern tribe, were thus assimilated with the dog, whereas the Man and the Min, people from the south, shared the attributes of the reptiles. The Qiang had a sheep radical.

The late American anthropologist and linguist Paul K. Benedict described covert ethnic slurs as the "pejorativization of exonymized names". In a discussion of autonyms, Benedict said,

a leading Chinese linguist has remarked that the name 'Lolo' is offensive only when written with the 'dog' radical. There is undoubtedly here some reflection of the underlying Chinese equation of 'word' with 'written character', providing a clue to the 'pejorativization' of 'exonymized' names of this kind: by writing my name with a 'dog' alongside it you are calling me a 'dog' (and in Chinese this is a unisex epithet). The modern Chinese practice is to write these tribal names with the 'human being' radical, thereby raising their level of acceptance.

Radical 9 人 or 亻, the "person" or "human" radical, is considered a semantically unprejudiced graphic element. It was used in a few early exonyms, such as 僰 Bó "Bo people" (depicting a person in 棘 "thorns") in southern China (especially Sichuan).

In addition to having linguistically unique graphic pejoratives, Chinese, like all human languages, has typical disparaging terms for foreign peoples or "ethnophaulisms". Wilkinson lists three commonly used words: nú 奴 "slave" (e.g., Xiōngnú 匈奴 "fierce slaves; Xiongnu people"), guǐ 鬼 "devil; ghost" (guǐlǎo or Cantonese Gweilo 鬼佬 "devil men; Western barbarians"), and lǔ 虜 "captive; caitiff" (Suǒlǔ 索虜 "unkempt caitiffs; Tuoba people", now officially written 拓拔 "develop pull"). Unlike official Chinese language reforms, Wilkinson notes, "Unofficially and not infrequently graphic pejoratives were added or substituted" in loanword transcriptions, as when Fǎlánxī 法蘭西 (with lán 蘭 "orchid; moral excellence") "France" was written Fǎlángxī 法狼西 (with láng 狼 "wolf").

== History ==
Magnus Fiskesjö suggested that

One of the prototypes of "right" names for barbarians is the very ancient ethnonym Qiang, which shows up in the earliest forms of Chinese writing after 1200 BCE and is still with us today as the name of a non-Chinese people to the west of central China. It was originally a rendering of a horned being, and scholars debate whether this referred to sheepherders or to sheeplike or deerlike people.

Over time, the term Qiang would be repurposed to describe different groups of "barbarians to the west". In ancient and medieval China, other groups of barbarians received names that were written with characters that mean dog, wolf, bug, snake or similar.

Wa was the earliest written name of Japan, and the first graphic pejorative to be replaced by another character. Han dynasty (206 BCE – 24 CE) scribes initially wrote the exonym "Japan" as 倭 (Japanese Wa, modern Mandarin Wō), meaning "submissive, dwarf". The Japanese adopted this kanji as their autonym, but replaced it with 和 Wa "harmony; peace" circa 756, and convinced the Tang dynasty (618–907 CE) Chinese to adopt the new autonym, 日本 (Japanese Nihon, modern Mandarin Rìběn), literally "root of the sun".

The American sinologist Herrlee Glessner Creel said some early exonyms "may have been given by the Chinese as terms of contempt—this is hard to determine—but it is unlikely that all of them were". Pejorative Chinese characters, especially semantically negative ones replaced with semantically positive characters, unmistakably determine ethnic contempt.

Zhou dynasty cosmography of Huaxia and the Siyi: Dongyi in the east, Nanman in the south, Xirong in the west, and Beidi in the north.

Despite Creel's warning about the complications of determining which early Chinese exonyms were derogatory, the first character dictionary, Xu Shen's (121 CE) Shuowen Jiezi provides invaluable data about Han dynasty usage. Take for example, definitions of the "Siyi" "Four Barbarians" surrounding ancient China – the Dongyi, Nanman, Xirong, and Beidi – where two are defined militarily and two bestially.

- Yi 夷: "平也. 從大從弓. 東方之人也." "Level; flat. From 大 'big (person)' and 弓 'bow' radicals. Eastern people." (11/20)
- Man 蠻: "南蠻, 蛇穜. 從虫䜌聲." "Southern Man, a snake species. From 虫 'insect' radical and 䜌 luán phonetic." (14/5)
- Rong 戎: "兵也. 從戈從甲." "Weapons, warfare. From 戈 'dagger axe; halberd' and 甲 'helmet' radicals." (13/21)
- Di 狄: "赤狄, 本犬種. 狄之為言淫辟也. 從犬,亦省聲." "Red Di, originally a dog species. Calling the Di dogs refers to licentiousness and depravity. From 犬 'dog' radical, which is also phonetic." (11/8)

While graphic pejoratives appear to have originated in the Shang dynasty (c. 1600–1046 BCE), they continued to be used into the Qing dynasty (1644–1912 CE). The anti-Manchu revolutionary Zhang Binglin (1868–1936) blended traditional Chinese imagery with fashionable Western racial theory; Dikötter quoted Zhang's writing on the topic such as "Barbarian tribes, unlike the civilized yellow and white races, were the biological descendants of lower species: the Di had been generated by dogs, and the Jiang could trace their ancestry back to sheep." Historian John K. Fairbank says this type of imagery was not officially endorsed by the central authorities in China at that time: in fact the kǎozhèng movement of the Qing scholars (consisting of "Song Learning" and "Han Learning") as supported by the government was opposed to this to the point that out of some 2,320 resultingly suppressed works many were banned for having a perceived critical, "antibarbarian tone".

During the Chinese Civil War, both sides arrived at the conclusion that modern China should be a unitary state with some recognition of minority nationalities; this was related to the fact that at that time both sides of the conflict were looking for allies and attempted to mobilize and win to their cause various minority groups. As such, both groups started to introduce new regulations and reforms related to replacing old, derogatory terms with new ones. This begun with the Nationalist language reform in 1939 and was eventually taken up and continued by the communist authorities. Many revised names that became the modern names for the non-Chinese peoples were proposed by the Chinese anthropologist Ruey Yih-Fu (pinyin: Ruì Yìfū). Ruey's pioneering work also traced the origins of such names, noting that early on, they were related to superstitions linking barbarian and animal lifestyles, with claims such that these people supposedly speak and/or live like animals; and later were transformed into prejudicial stereotypes about the innate character of these people.

During World War II, some Japanese propaganda in Chinese used graphic pejoratives, proposing new spellings of words such as America or England, written with the same dog (quan) qualifier as used for by Chinese language for various historical groups of barbarians.

Fiskesjö suggests that while the language has changed, conceptually, connection of concept of barbarians/minorities to primitive life style and wild nature still persists in modern China, and is reinforced and exploited by the tourist industry.

== Examples ==
Although most characters for modern ethnic groups have been bowdlerized, some historical terms, such as 狄 Dí "northern barbarians", remain in written Chinese.

=== Dog radical ===
As described above, the "dog", "beast", or "quadruped" radical 犭 is especially common among graphic pejoratives for Chinese exonyms. The Dutch sinologist Robert van Gulik describes this practice as "the unkind Chinese habit of writing the names of the 'barbarians' surrounding their territory with the classifier 'quadruped'". The German anthropologist Karl Jettmar explains that calling outsiders "wild beasts, jackals, and wolves" linguistically justified using brutality against them.

Language reforms initiated in the Republic of China in the late 1930s and continued in the People's Republic of China in the 1950s replaced "dog" radical ethnonyms of minority peoples with more positive characters.

The Yao people's exonym changed twice from 猺 yáo "jackal; the Yao" (犭 "dog radical" and 䍃 yáo phonetic), to 傜 yáo "the Yao" (亻"human radical"), and then to 瑤 yáo "precious jade; green jasper; the Yao" (玉 "jade radical"). Chinese dictionaries first defined 猺 yáo as the "name of a wild animal" (11th-century Jiyun: 獸名), and later as the "tribe of southern barbarians" (17th-century Zhengzitong: 蠻屬). The Chinese-English dictionary of Robert Henry Mathews records traditional Chinese prejudice about the Yao, "the books describe them as being very wild; they are said to have a short tail; and the skin on the soles of their feet is spoken of as being more than one inch in thickness".

The Zhuang people (an ethnic minority primarily living in Guangxi) are currently written with the character for 壮 zhuàng "strong; robust", but Zhuang was initially transcribed with the character for 獞 tóng "a dog name", and then with 僮 tóng ("human" radical) "child; boy servant". The late American sinologist and lexicographer John DeFrancis described how the People's Republic of China removed the graphic pejoration.

Sometimes the use of one radical or another can have a special significance, as in the case of removing an ethnic slur from the name of the Zhuang minority in southwest China, which used to be written with the dog radical but after 1949 was first written with the human radical and was later changed to a completely different character with the respectable meaning "sturdy":

- 獞 Zhuàng (with the dog radical)
- 僮 Zhuàng (with the human radical)
- 壮 Zhuàng ("sturdy")

This 1949 change to 僮 Zhuàng was made after the Chinese Civil War, and the change to 壮 Zhuàng was made during the 1965 standardization of simplified Chinese characters.

The Yi people or Lolo, whose current Chinese exonym is 彝 yí "sacrificial wine vessel; Yi peoples", used to be condescendingly called the 猓猓 Luǒluó, giving a new luǒ reading to 猓 guǒ "proboscis monkey" ("dog" radical and 果 guǒ phonetic). The first replacement was ("human" radical) 倮 luǒ, already used as a graphic variant character for ("clothing radical") 裸 luǒ "naked"; the second was 罗 luó "bird net; gauze".

The Lahu people were written 猓黑 Luǒhēi, with this same simian 猓 luǒ' and 黑 "black". Their modern exonym is Lāhù 拉祜, transcribing with 拉 lā "pull; drag" and 祜 hù "favor or protection from heaven".

The Bouyei people in southern China and Vietnam are called 仲家 Zhòngjiā, written with the "human radical" term 仲 zhòng "second; middle (of three months or brothers)". The earlier ethnonym 狆家 Zhòngjiā used the "dog radical" term 狆 zhòng "lap dog; pug", which now usually refers to the Japanese Chin (from Japanese language 狆 chin).

The modern Chinese transcription for the Gelao people is 仡佬族 Gēlǎozú with the "human radical", and Gēlǎo was previously written 犵狫 with the "dog radical" and the same phonetic elements. The word liao 獠 originally meant "night hunting; long, protruding teeth", and beginning during the Wei-Jin period (266–420) was also pronounced 獠 lǎo meaning "an aboriginal tribe in southwest China (= 狫 lǎo); ugly". This 僚人 Lǎoren, from earlier 狫人 or 獠人, is the modern name for the Rau peoples (including Zhuang, Buyei, and Tay–Nùng).

Additional "dog" radical examples of exonyms include the ancient Quanrong 犬戎 "dog barbarians" or "dog belligerents" and Xianyun 獫狁 (written with 獫 or 玁 xiǎn "long-snouted dog; black dog with a yellow face"). Feng Li, a Columbia University historian of early China, suggests a close semantic relation, noting that "It is very probable that when the term Xianyun came to be written with the two characters 獫狁, the notion of 'dog' associated with the character xian thus gave rise to the term Quanrong 犬戎, or the 'Dog Barbarians'."

The Chinese name for Jews, 犹太人 Yóutàirén, or 猶太人 in traditional characters, contains a "dog" radical but has not been revised. However, the character 猶 only means "just like".

=== Other radicals ===
Some graphic pejoratives used significs besides the "dog" radical.

Radical 123 羊, the "sheep" radical, is seen in the ancient 羯 Jié "wether; Jie people" and the modern 羌 Qiāng "shepherd; Qiang people".

Radical 153 豸, the "cat" or "beast" radical, appears in the ancient 貊 or 貘 Mò "panther; northeastern barbarians", who are associated with the ancient 濊貊 Wèimò "Yemaek people" (in Manchuria and Korea).

Radical 177 革, the "animal hide" or "leather" radical, is used in character names for two northern barbarians. 韃靼 Dádá "Tartar people" is written with 韃 dá "red-dyed leather" and 靼 dá "pliable leather; tanned hide". The (c. 1609) Shanhai Yudi Quantu "Complete Terrestrial Map" uses Dada for "Tartary". 靺鞨 Mòhé "Mohe people; Tungusic peoples" is written with 靺 mò "socks; stockings" and 鞨 hé "shoes".

Radical 142 虫, the "insect" or "reptile" radical, is used for the early 蠻 Mán "southern barbarians" and modern-day 閩 Mǐn people (see Fujian#History). In Minnan they are both pronounced as /ban˨˦/ (POJ: bân). Xu Shen's Shuowen defines both words as 蛇種 shézhǒng "a type of snake". The American philologist and linguist Victor H. Mair explains the modern significance of these two ancient graphic pejoratives as follows:

The debasement of local languages and cultures in China (whether they are Sinitic or non-Sinitic) is so ubiquitous that people become inured to it. They internalize the negative stereotypes associated with peripherality and sheer difference (from the orthodox language and culture of the center). This subtle (but sometimes also brutal) psychological conditioning extends even to the names people call themselves and the totemic myths with which they identify. For instance, the people of Fujian and Taiwan are proud to identify themselves as being from Min, but seldom do they consider that the character adopted to write this name over two millennia ago (it did not yet exist among the oracle bone and bronze inscriptions) includes the infamous chóng ("insect; serpent") radical. There it is staring you right in the face every time you look at the character: a bug inside of a door, but people do not see the insect / snake, perhaps because they do not want to see it or cannot bear to see it. Here is how Xu Shen explained the character used to write mín around the year 100 CE: "Southeastern Yue [i.e., Viet]; snake race. [The character is formed] from [the] insect / serpent [radical and takes its pronunciation from] mén." 東南越蛇穜从虫門聲 ... Southern Min speakers refer to themselves as bân-lâm-lâng, which is usually written with sinographs meaning "Southern Min person" 閩南人, but should actually be written with sinographs meaning "Southern barbarian fellow" 蠻南儂. ... The graph pronounced lâm in Taiwanese is the notorious mán ("barbarians [of the south]") as pronounced in MSM. Here is how Xu Shen explains the graph used to write lâm / mán: "Southern barbarians [who are a] snake race. [The character is formed] from [the] insect / serpent [radical and takes its pronunciation from] luàn 南蠻蛇種从虫" ... The Mán inhabitants of Mǐn are thus doubly southern, doubly barbarian, and doubly serpentine. Since these explanations have been enshrined in the most authoritative, foundational dictionary of the sinographs, a dictionary which is still invoked with reverence today, there is no denying them. The impact that such designations have had on the consciousness of those who are on both the receiving end and the giving-end is enormous.

== See also ==
- Gweilo
- Hate speech
- List of Chinese ethnic slurs
- List of Chinese racial euphemisms
- List of ethnic group names used as insults
- List of ethnic slurs
- Term of disparagement
