= Jin Zhuo =

Chinese scholar

Jin Zhuo (Chinese: 晉灼) was a Chinese scholar, historian and commentator from the Jin dynasty (晉朝, 265–316 CE) of the late 3rd–4th century CE. His works are cited by ancient and modern scholars, and in many cases his comments are only known from the works of the Chinese classical historians. The commentaries of Jin Zhuo are referred to for the subjects of history and historiography, ancient politics, ancient law, ethnic relations and relations with neighbors, the reading of Chinese ancient characters, and the elucidation of ancient locations.
