= Fengsu Tongyi =

Almanac written by Ying Shao (c.195)

Fengsu Tongyi (Chinese: 風俗通義; lit. 'Comprehensive Meaning of Customs and Mores'), also known as Fengsu Tong (风俗通), is a book written about 195 AD by Ying Shao, who lived during the later Eastern Han period. The manuscript is similar to an almanac, which describes various strange and exotic matters of interest to the literati of the period, such as cultural practices, mystical beliefs, and musical instruments.

== Chapters ==
There were originally a total of 30 chapters, but only 10 remain. These chapters were recompiled by the Northern Song scientist Su Song (蘇頌) from the works of Yu Zhongrong (庾仲容) and Ma Zong (馬總). Some fragments of the lost chapters exist as quotations in other Chinese texts.

1. 皇霸 Huangba
2. 正失 Zhengshi
3. 愆禮 Yanli
4. 過譽 Guoyu
5. 十反 Shifan
6. 聲音 Shengyin
7. 窮通 Qiongtong
8. 祀典 Sidian
9. 怪神 Guaishen
10. 山澤 Shanze

The twenty lost chapters are: Xinzheng 心政, Guzhi 古制, Yinjiao 陰教, Bianhuo 辨惑, Xidang 析當, Shudu 恕度, Jiahao 嘉號, Zhengcheng 徽稱, Qingyu 情遇, Xingshi 姓氏, Huipian 諱篇, Shiji 釋忌, Jishi 輯事, Fuyao 服妖, Sangji 喪祭, Gongshi 宮室, Shijing 市井, Shuji 數紀, Xinqin 新秦, and Yufa 獄法.
