= History of ethnic groups in China =

Long story of Chinese ethnicities

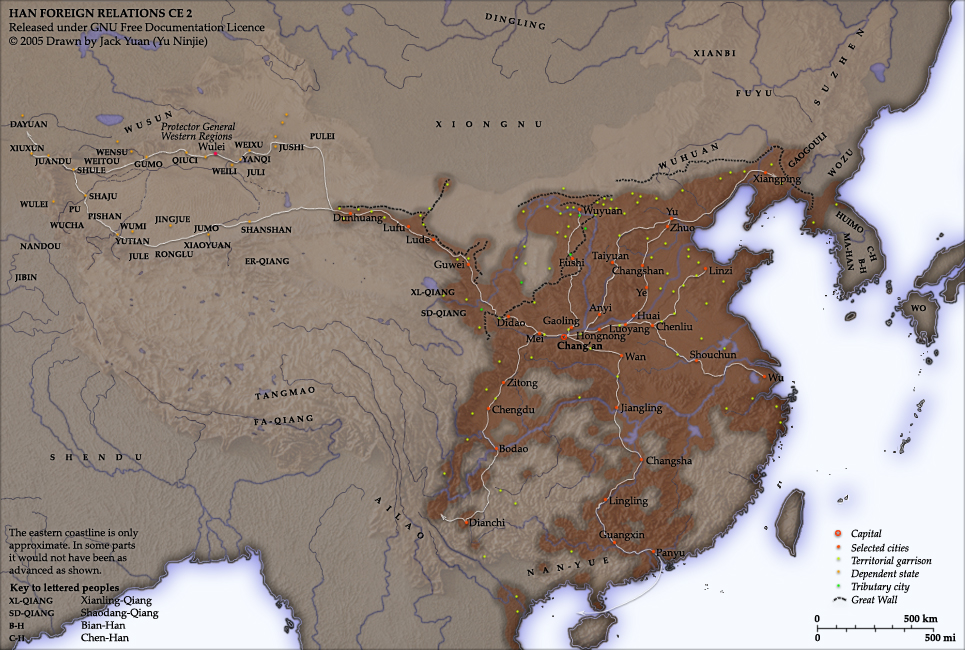
Map of the Chinese Han dynasty in 2 CE. Names of non-Chinese peoples and states have been purposely left with their Chinese names (e.g. Dayuan instead of Fergana; Gaogouli instead of Goguryeo) to reflect the fact that knowledge of participants in the Han world order comes almost exclusively from Chinese sources.

There have been various or presumed ethnicities of significance to the history of China, gathered through the study of Classical Chinese literature, Chinese and non-Chinese literary sources and inscriptions, historical linguistics, and archaeological research.

Among the difficulties in the study of ethnic groups in China are the relatively long periods of time involved, together with the large volume of literary and historical records which have accompanied the history of China. Classical Chinese ethnography (like much premodern ethnography) was often sketchy, leaving it unclear as to whether Chinese-depicted names referred to a true ethnic group or a possibly multiethnic political entity. Even then, ethnonyms were sometimes assigned by geographic location or surrounding features, rather than by any features of the people themselves, and often carried little distinction of who the Han Chinese authors considered Chinese and non-Chinese for differences such as lifestyle, language, or governance. Many of the ethnonyms were historically used in such a way as to invite comparison with the word barbarian.

== English names ==
The Chinese exonyms of various ethnic groups encountered in Chinese history can be rendered into English either by transliteration or translation; for instance, Dí 狄 is transliterated as Di (or Ti) or translated as "Northern Barbarians". In some cases authors prefer to transliterate specific exonyms as proper nouns, and in other cases to translate generic ones as English "barbarian" (for instance, "Four Barbarians"). The American sinologist Marc S. Abramson explains why "barbarian" is the appropriate translation for general terms like fan 番 and hu 胡, but not specific ones like fancai 番菜 "foreign-style food".

Translations such as "foreigner" and "alien," though possessing an air of scholarly neutrality, are inappropriate as a general translation because they primarily connote geographic and political outsiderness, implying that individuals and groups so designated were external to the Tang Empire and ineligible to become subjects of the empire. This was frequently not the case with many uses of fan and related terms — most common among them were hu (often used in the Tang to denote Central Asians) and four ethnonyms of great antiquity that, by the Tang, were mostly used generically with implicit geographic connotations: yi (east), man (south), rong (west), and di (north) — that largely connoted cultural and ethnic otherness but did not exclude the designated persons or groups from membership in the empire. Although the term barbarian has undergone many transformations from its Greek origins to its current English usage, not all of which are relevant to the Tang (such as its use in medieval Europe to denote religious difference, marking non-Christians of various ethnic, geographic, and political affiliations), its consistent association with inferiority, lack of civilization, and externality in the broadest sense often make it the most appropriate choice, including some cases when it is placed in the mouths of non-Han referring to themselves or others. However, its pejorative connotations make it inappropriate as a general translation. Thus, I have chosen not to translate these terms when they designate particular groups, individuals, or phenomena and do not refer to a specific ethnic group, language, geographic place, or cultural complex.

== List of ethnic groups ==
The following table summarizes the various ethnic groups and/or other social groups of known historical significance to the history of China (any non clear-cut connection is denoted by a question mark):

| Pinyin Romanization | Names in Chinese characters and pronunciation | Approximate residence according to Chinese texts | Time of appearance in the history of China | Equivalence(s) of non-Chinese names | Time of appearance outside China | Possible descendant(s) |
|---|---|---|---|---|---|---|
| Miao | 苗 (Miáo) | Name applied to peoples in various areas stretching from provinces (Hebei, Shanxi) north of the Yellow River to Yunnan province | As early as 25th century BC to present | Hmong, Hmu, Xong, A Hmao | N/A | Modern Miao, Hmong |
| Yuezhi | 月氏 (Yuèzhī) | Tarim basin | c. 6th century BC to 162 BC, then driven out by Xiongnu. | Kushans, Tocharians | Mid-2nd century BC in Central Asia | No known descendants, but possibly absorbed into the Uyghurs, who now show a large plurality of Indo-European DNA. Maybe the descendants of the Kushan Empire are the Pashtuns. |
| Huaxia | 華夏 (Huáxià) 漢人 (Hànrén) | Guanzhong and Yellow River basins in Northern China | From earliest history or prehistorical (name comes from the Han dynasty) | Yanhuang, Zhonghua, Zhongguo, Huaxia, Hua, Xia, Han, Han Chinese, Chinese | Han dynasty | Modern Han Chinese |
| Baiyue | 百越 (Bǎiyuè) | Name applied to various peoples residing in East China, South China, and North Vietnam | 8th century BC to 1st century AD, assimilated into Hans | Bách Việt | Early 6th Century BC to 3rd century AD | Part of Cantonese, along with various ethnic minorities such as the Zhuang, Dai, Tai, Bouyei, Aisui, Kam, Hlai, Mulam, and Maonan. |
| Wu and Yue | 吴越 (Wúyuè) | Present-day Southern Jiangsu province, Northern Zhejiang province, Shanghai | 8th century BC to 5th century BC | Ngô Việt | N/A | Wu Chinese people |
| Minyue | 閩越 (Mǐnyuè) | Present day Fujian province | 4th century BC to 2nd century BC | Mân Việt | N/A | Min Chinese people |
| Luoyue | 雒越 (Luòyuè) | Present day Northern Vietnam,Southern Guangxi province | 8th century BC to 1st century AD | Lạc Việt | N/A | Zhuang people, Hlai people |
| Ouyue | 甌越 (Ōuyuè) | Present day Northern Vietnam, western Guangdong, and northern Guangxi | 4th century BC | Âu Việt | N/A | Cantonese, Zhuang |
| Yelang | 夜郎(Yèláng) | Guizhou | 3rd century BC to 1st century BC | Zangke, Dạ Lang | N/A | Possibly Yi |
| Wuhuan | 烏桓 (Wūhuán) | Western portions of Manchuria (Heilongjiang, Jilin, Liaoning provinces) and Inner Mongolia | 4th century BC to late 3rd century BC, assimilated into Hans | No known equivalence | N/A | Possibly Kumo Xi; the rest were presumably assimilated into Hans. |
| Xianbei | 鮮卑 (Xiānbēi) | Manchuria (Heilongjiang, Jilin, Liaoning provinces), Mongolia, and Inner Mongolia. Moved into areas north of the Yellow River and founded a dynasty there. | c. 4th century BC to mid-6th century, some Xianbeis assimilated into Hans | N/A | N/A | Possibly some of the Mongols, Tibetans, Monguor people, Sibe people, Evenks, and Chinese (some Chinese people today have the sinicised presumably Xianbei surnames such as Yuwen, Yuchi, Zhangsun, Tuoba, Murong and Huyan) |
| Qiang | 羌 (Qiāng) | Gansu, Qinghai, western portion of Sichuan, eastern portion of Xinjiang, and northeastern portion of Tibet | Mentioned in oracle bone inscriptions of the Shang dynasty, c. 14th century BC to c. 1050 BC. c. 4th century BC to late 5th century, assimilated into Hans | No known equivalence | N/A | Modern Qiang, Tangut, Old Tibetan, Nakhi, Jingpho, and Lahu |
| Di | 氐 (Dī) | Areas of neighboring borders of Gansu, Qinghai, Sichuan, and Shaanxi | c. 8th century BC to mid-6th century, assimilated into Tibetans, Hans and other Sino-Tibetan - speaking ethnic groups | No known equivalence | N/A | Baima people |
| Jie | 羯 (Jié) | Shanxi province | Late 2nd century to mid-4th century | No known equivalence | N/A | The majority died in the Ran Wei–Later Zhao war, the rest assimilated into Hans. Some Turkic people or Yeniseian people may be related to the Jie. |
| Dian | 滇國 (diānguó) | Dian Lake, Yunnan | 4th century BC to 1st century BC, assimilated into Hans | Điền | N/A | No known descendants. |
| Qiuci | 龜茲 (Qiūcí) | Tarim Basin, Xinjiang | 2nd century BC to 10th century AD, first encountered during the reign of Emperor Wu of Han; assimilated by Uyghurs and others | Tocharians | Date unknown, although they were part of the Bronze Age Indo-European migrations (see Tarim mummies) | During antiquity, Indo-European peoples inhabited the oasis city-state of Kucha (as well as Turfan) in the Tarim Basin region of Xinjiang. They fell under the Imperial Chinese orbit of control during the Han and Tang dynasties (see Protectorate of the Western Regions, Tang campaign against the oasis states, and Protectorate General to Pacify the West), but were eventually conquered by the Uyghur Khaganate and then assimilated by Qocho Uyghurs (856-1335 AD). |
| Dingling | 丁零 (Dīnglíng), 高車 (Gāochē) | Banks of Lake Baikal and on the borders of present-day Mongolia and Russia, migrated to modern-day Shanxi and Xinjiang | 1st century BC to late 5th century | Gaoche, Chile | 1st century BC | Tiele |
| Rouran | 柔然 (Róurán), 蠕蠕 (Rúrú), 茹茹 (Rúrú) | Present-day Mongolia, Inner Mongolia, northern portions of Shanxi, Shaanxi, Gansu, Ningxia, and eastern portion of Xinjiang | Early 3rd century to early 6th century | Nirun/Mongols (possibly others falling under the label as well) | Late 6th century to early 9th century | Mongols |
| Tujue | 突厥 (Tūjué) | Present-day Mongolia, Inner Mongolia, northern portions of Shanxi, Shaanxi, Gansu, Ningxia, Xinjiang, and eastern portion of Kazakhstan and Kyrgyzstan | Late 5th century to mid-10th century | Göktürks | Mid-6th century to early 9th century | The eastern Turks assimilated mainly to the Orkhon Uyghurs who conquered them; as for several Western-Turkic-affiliated tribes: Karluks (standard Chinese: Géluólù 葛邏祿) became linguistic ancestors and partial genetic ancestors of modern Karluk Turkic speakers; Oghuz Turks possibly descend from the Western Turkic tribe Gūsū 姑蘇.); the Khazars, whose political association with Göktürks was suggested by their Chinese name 突厥曷薩 Tūjué Hésà; 突厥可薩 Tūjué Kěsà, lit. 'Türk Khazar', were possibly led by the Ashina clan. The Shatuo Turks consisted of three tribes: the formerly Western Turkic-associated Chuyue tribe, the formerly Türgesh-associated Suoge (娑葛), and Anqing (安慶) of Sogdian origins. |
| Huihu | 回紇 (Huíhé) | Present-day Mongolia, Inner Mongolia, northern portions of Shanxi, Shaanxi, Gansu, Ningxia | Early 7th century to mid-10th century | Toquz Oghuz, Uyghurs or Yugurs | Early 9th century to present | Yugur |
| Tibetans | 吐蕃 (Tǔbō, also pronounced as Tǔfān) | Present-day Tibet, Qinghai, western areas of Sichuan and Yunnan, parts of Gansu, Southern border of Xinjiang | Mid-6th century to present | N/A | Early 6th century to present, a 2016 study reveals the date of divergence between Tibetans and Han Chinese was estimated to have taken place around 15,000 to 9,000 years ago. | Modern Tibetans |
| Khitans | 契丹 (Qìdān) | Present-day Mongolia, Inner Mongolia, Manchuria, Liaoning, northern border of Shanxi and Hebei, and later in Xinjiang and eastern border of Kazakhstan | c. 4th century to 12th century | Khitan | 4th century to 12th century | Possibly Daur, and some Baarins, Chinese, Mongolians (There exist descendants of war-scattered Khitan soldiers sent to Yunnan and Guangxi provinces during the Yuan dynasty in Baoshan, Yunnan) |
| Xi or Kumo Xi | 庫莫奚 (Kùmòxī) | More or less the same residence of the Khitans, since regarded as two ethnic groups with one unique ancestry | Pre-4th century to mid-12th century | No known equivalence | N/A | No known descendants (possibly Mongols) |
| Shiwei | 室韋 (Shìwéi) | Present-day Mongolia, Inner Mongolia, western Manchuria and southern Siberia | Late 6th century to late 10th century | No known equivalence | N/A | Conquered by Khitans, splinter groups and remnants re-emerged as Mongols and Tungusic peoples |
| Menggu | 蒙古 (Ménggǔ) | Present-day Mongolia, Inner Mongolia, western Manchuria, southern Siberia, and eastern and central Xinjiang before Genghis Khan | Since late c. 8th century | Mongols | Late 12th century to present | Mongols There remain descendants of Mongol soldiers sent to Sichuan, Yunnan, and Guangxi provinces during the Yuan dynasty. |
| Dangxiang | 党項 (Dǎngxiàng) | Ningxia, Gansu, northern portions of Shanxi, southwestern portion of Mongolia, Southeastern portion of Xinjiang | c. Mid-8th century to early 13th century, some Dangxiang assimilated into Hans | Tanguts | N/A | Part of the Hui community (Dungan), Ersu, part of Amdo Tibetans, part of Han Chinese in Mizhi, Shaanxi.) |
| Sai | 塞 (Sāi) | Widespread throughout Central Asia | 2nd century BC to 1st century BC | Saka | 5th century BC | Maybe ancestral to the Pashtuns and the Wakhi. |
| Sute | 粟特 (Sùtè) | Widespread throughout Central Asia; also lived in China proper | 1st century BC to 11th century AD | Sogdians | 6th century BC | Modern Yagnobi people. |
| Manchus | 女真 (Nǚzhēn), 滿族 (Mǎnzú) | Manchuria and northern portion of Inner Mongolia | Early 10th century to present, established the Jin and Qing dynasties, many Manchus have lost their native Manchu language and only speak Mandarin Chinese | Mohe, Jurchens, Mancho, Manchurian, Manchurian Chinese | Since mid-17th century, first encountered by the Russians | Modern Manchus. Largest minority ethnic group in the Dongbei region. Modern Manchus have mostly lost their language and by and large have assimilated into Han Chinese culture, though there are some distinctive aspects that still remain. |
| Jews | 猶太 (Yóutài) | Kaifeng | 7th century to present, many Jews have very much assimilated into Hui people after converting to Islam. The Nanjing and Beijing Jews became Muslims At the start of the 20th century the Zhang Kaifeng Jewish family became Muslims. Muslim men married Jewish women. Some Jews adopted non-Jewish sons. After the 1642 Yellow River flood some Muslim women were taken as wives by a Kaifeng Jew "the handsome" Zhang Mei (Chang Mei). Kaifeng Jews became Muslims. Islam was taken up after Kaifeng Jews married Muslims. The converts to Islam retained Jewish characteristics after conversion. | Jewish, Jewish Chinese, Hebrews, Israelites, Youtai | N/A | Modern Jews. Kaifeng is known for having the oldest extent Jewish community in China. Many Chinese Jews have very much assimilated into Hui Muslims, though a number of international Jewish groups have helped Chinese Jews rediscover their Jewish roots. Kaifeng Jewish ancestry has been found among their descendants living among the Hui Muslims, such as during a hajj pilgrimage the Hui Muslim woman Jin Xiaojing (金效靜) found out about her Jewish ancestry and wrote about it in an article, "China's Jews" (中国的犹太人) published in "Points East" in 1981. Scholars have pointed out that Hui Muslims may have absorbed Kaifeng Jews instead of Han Confucians and Buddhists. Jewish converts to Islam who became Hui Muslims in 16th century China were called the blue hat Hui (藍帽回回) since they converted to Islam due to similarities in their traditions. One of the 7 prominent Hui Muslim clans of Kaifeng, the Zhang Jewish clan, became Muslim. The Zhang family, among several Hui Muslims with Kaifeng Jewish ancestry call themselves "fake Muslims" since they are openly proud of their ancestry Instead of being absorbed into Han, a portion of the Jews of China of Kaifeng became Hui Muslims. In 1948 Samuel Stupa Shih (Shi Hong Mo) (施洪模) said he saw a Hebrew language "Religion of Israel" Jewish inscription on a tombstone in a Qing dynasty Muslim cemetery to a place west of Hangzhou. |
| Koreans | 朝鮮族 (Cháoxiǎnzú) | Heilongjiang, Jilin, Liaoning, primarily Southeastern Manchuria | mid 7th century to present, some Koreans assimilated into Hui people. | Hanminjok, Joseonminjok, Goryeo, Hanguo, Chaoxian, Korean, Korean-Chinese | N/A | Modern Koreans |
| Yamato | 大和 (Dàhé) | Zhejiang and Fujian Jilin, Inner Mongolia, and Liaoning (as settlers in Manchuria) | 13th century, from Japanese pirates who settled in China | Yamato, Japanese | N/A | Possibly interbred or assimilated into Han Chinese. |
| Ryukyuans | 琉球 (Liúqiú) | Zhejiang and Fujian Jilin, Inner Mongolia, and Liaoning (as settlers in Manchuria) | 13th century, from Japanese pirates who settled in China | Ryukyu, Ryukyuans | N/A | Possibly interbred or assimilated into Han Chinese. |

== See also ==
- Barbarian
- Ethnic minorities in China
- Graphic pejoratives in written Chinese
- History of China
- List of ethnic groups in China
- Secession in China
- Wu Hu
