= Gongliu =

Gongliu may refer to:

- Tokkuztara County in China
- Gongliu of Zhou, an ancestor of the Zhou dynasty
