= Binzhou, Shaanxi =

Coordinates: 35°03′15″N 108°04′53″E

Binzhou 彬州市
- County-level city
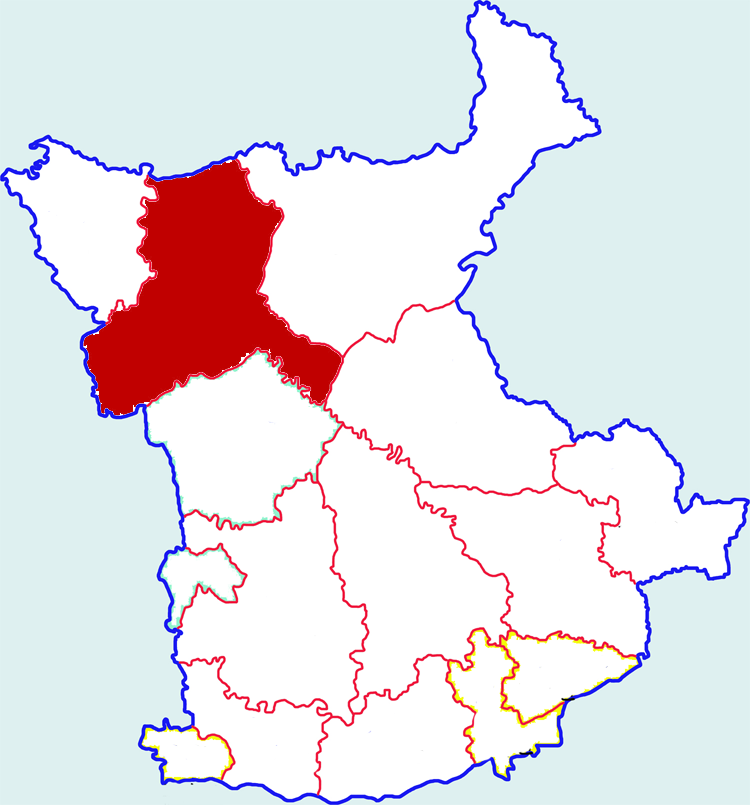
- Binzhou in Xianyang

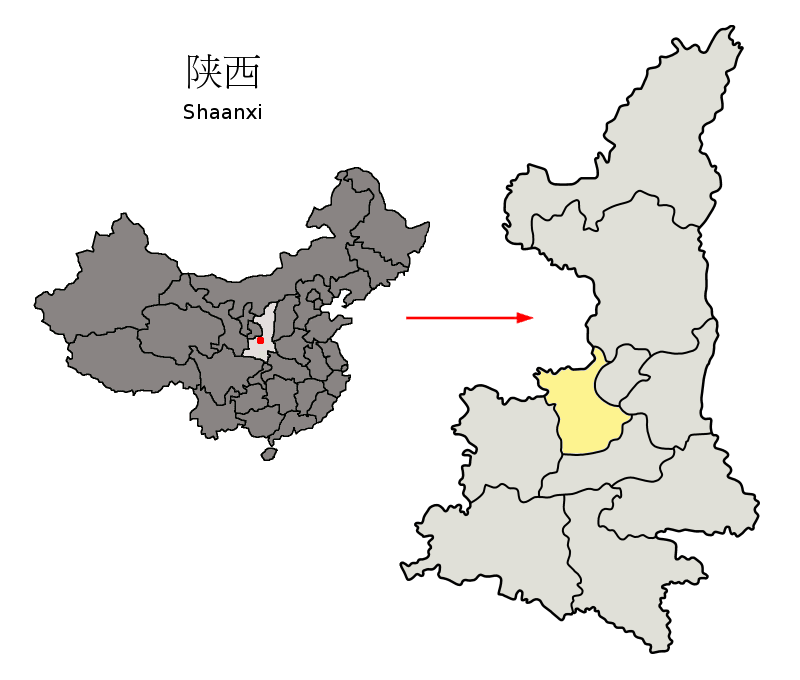
- Xianyang in Shaanxi
- Country: People's Republic of China
- Province: Shaanxi
- Prefecture-level city: Xianyang

Area
  - Total: 1,185 km^{2} (458 sq mi)

Population (2017)
  - Total: 366,800
  - Density: 309.5/km^{2} (801.7/sq mi)
- Time zone: UTC+8 (China standard time)
- Postal Code: 713500
- Website: www.snbinzhou.gov.cn

Binzhou (Chinese: 彬州; pinyin: Bīnzhōu), formerly known as Bin County or Binxian (simplified Chinese: 彬县; traditional Chinese: 彬縣; pinyin: Bīn Xiàn), is a county-level city of Xianyang, Shaanxi, China, bordering Gansu province in two disparate sections to the north and west.

== History ==
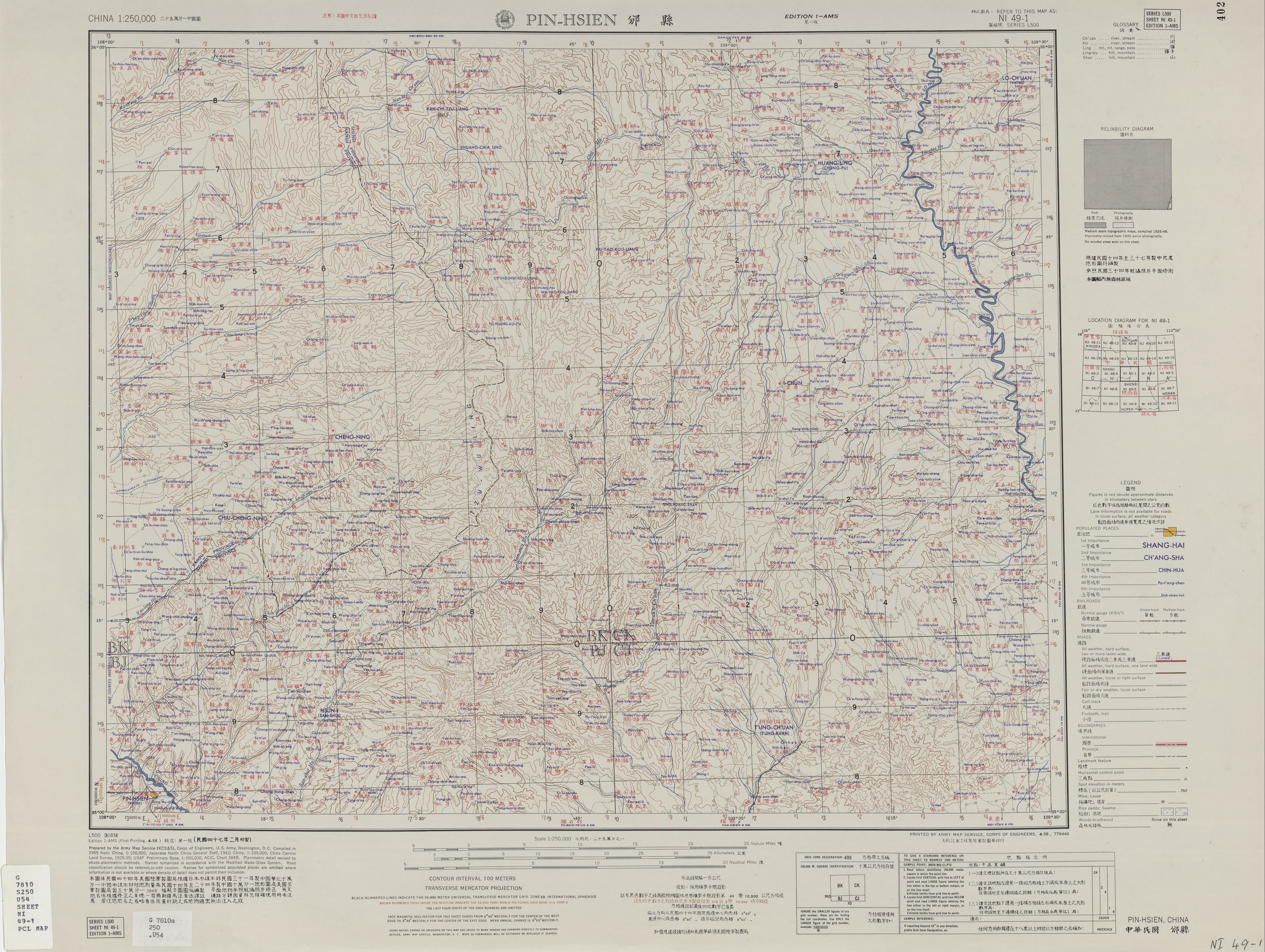
Map including Bin County (labeled as PIN-HSIEN (walled) 邠縣) (AMS, 1955)

When Binzhou was first established during the Qin dynasty, it was called Qi County (simplified Chinese: 漆县; traditional Chinese: 漆縣; pinyin: Qī Xiàn). Later, the name was changed to Xinping Jun. During the Tang dynasty, The emperor Xuanzong changed its name to Binzhou. While in 1913 it was changed to Bin County (邠县; 邠縣; Bīn Xiàn). In 1964, the name was changed once more, closer to its current form (彬县; 彬縣; Bīn Xiàn). In May 2018, with the approval of the State Council, the then-Bin County was upgraded to the present county-level city status and renamed Binzhou.

In its current form, Bin County is named for Bin, the former home where Buzhu settled the Ji clan which became the Zhou dynasty.

== Administrative subdivisions ==
Binzhou holds jurisdiction over thirteen towns.

Towns

- Chengguan (城关镇)
- Beiji (北极镇)
- Xinmin (新民镇)
- Longgao (龙高镇)
- Yimen (义门镇)
- Shuikou (水口镇)

Towns are upgraded from Townships.

- Xiangmiao (香庙镇)
- Tandian (炭店镇)
- Didian (底店镇)

Towns are established newly.

- Xiaocao (小章镇)
- Yongyue (永乐镇)
- Chaojia (韩家镇)
- Dayu (太峪镇)

Former Towns are merged to other.

- Xiaozhang (肖张镇), Yongle (永乐镇)
- Xipo Township (西坡乡), Hanjia Township (阚家乡), Chejiazhuang Township (车家庄乡), Taiyu Township (太宇乡), Xinbaozi Township (新宝子乡)

== Climate ==
Climate data for Binzhou, elevation 920 m (3,020 ft), (1991–2020 normals, extremes 1981–2010)
Month	Jan	Feb	Mar	Apr	May	Jun	Jul	Aug	Sep	Oct	Nov	Dec	Year
Record high °C (°F)	15.9 (60.6)	24.1 (75.4)	29.8 (85.6)	35.5 (95.9)	36.1 (97.0)	38.5 (101.3)	39.5 (103.1)	37.1 (98.8)	37.5 (99.5)	30.5 (86.9)	24.7 (76.5)	18.8 (65.8)	39.5 (103.1)
Mean daily maximum °C (°F)	4.1 (39.4)	8.3 (46.9)	14.6 (58.3)	21.3 (70.3)	25.6 (78.1)	29.5 (85.1)	30.7 (87.3)	28.8 (83.8)	23.7 (74.7)	17.8 (64.0)	11.5 (52.7)	5.5 (41.9)	18.5 (65.2)
Daily mean °C (°F)	−2.5 (27.5)	1.5 (34.7)	7.4 (45.3)	13.6 (56.5)	18.1 (64.6)	22.3 (72.1)	24.4 (75.9)	22.9 (73.2)	17.8 (64.0)	11.4 (52.5)	4.8 (40.6)	−1.1 (30.0)	11.7 (53.1)
Mean daily minimum °C (°F)	−7.2 (19.0)	−3.5 (25.7)	1.7 (35.1)	7.1 (44.8)	11.5 (52.7)	16.1 (61.0)	19.3 (66.7)	18.5 (65.3)	13.7 (56.7)	7.1 (44.8)	0.2 (32.4)	−5.5 (22.1)	6.6 (43.9)
Record low °C (°F)	−19.3 (−2.7)	−15.4 (4.3)	−10.1 (13.8)	−3.0 (26.6)	1.1 (34.0)	7.5 (45.5)	12.4 (54.3)	10.5 (50.9)	2.1 (35.8)	−5.8 (21.6)	−12.5 (9.5)	−20.3 (−4.5)	−20.3 (−4.5)
Average precipitation mm (inches)	6.4 (0.25)	8.3 (0.33)	17.8 (0.70)	33.1 (1.30)	48.7 (1.92)	64.4 (2.54)	101.4 (3.99)	101.1 (3.98)	90.1 (3.55)	47.5 (1.87)	16.5 (0.65)	4.3 (0.17)	539.6 (21.25)
Average precipitation days (≥ 0.1 mm)	4.0	4.3	5.9	7.3	9.2	9.9	11.2	11.2	11.3	9.9	5.2	2.8	92.2
Average snowy days	5.0	4.2	2.0	0.2	0	0	0	0	0	0.1	1.9	3.0	16.4
Average relative humidity (%)	60	59	56	57	60	64	71	76	79	77	71	63	66
Mean monthly sunshine hours	157.0	150.2	177.3	209.0	221.0	215.0	209.6	179.2	132.8	127.1	145.3	158.1	2,081.6
Percentage possible sunshine	50	48	47	53	51	50	48	43	36	37	48	52	47
Source: China Meteorological Administration

== Notable residents ==
- Zhang Zengdao — government official from the late Qing period

== Transport ==
- China National Highway 312
- Xi'an–Pingliang railway
- G70 Fuzhou–Yinchuan Expressway
- Yinchuan–Xi'an high-speed railway

== See also ==
- Bin (city)
