= Qingjie =

- Father: Duke Liu

Qingjie (Chinese: 慶節) or Qing (Chinese: 慶) was a legendary leader of the Ji clan, which eventually established the Zhou dynasty of China. He is sometimes credited as a Duke of Zhou or with founding the city of Bin.

Traditional accounts list his father as Duke Liu and his son as Huangpu (皇仆). He succeeded the throne after Duke Liu.

== See also ==
- Buzhu 不窋
