= Peng Si =

Peng Si (born 1980 in Hengyang, Hunan Province) is a contemporary Chinese painter based in Beijing. While still a student at the prestigious Central Academy of Fine Arts, Peng exhibited his paintings alongside those of long-established artists in the Third National Oil Painting Exhibition. He graduated from the Central Academy in 2004. As a member of the "post-80s" generation of artists in China, Peng has been involved in several prominent group shows in the last few years; he has also been the subject of many solo exhibitions, and his work is featured in the collections of major galleries at Beijing's 798 Art Zone. Critics have praised his "implementation (of techniques) and reflection on Chinese and Western art", especially his calligraphic skill and his "thorough examination of trends in artistic thought" from the May Fourth Movement through the post-1949 period in China.

Peng Si's paintings of figures and landscapes are known for their melancholic, dreamlike, and uncannily modern blend of classical Chinese and traditional Western idioms. His brushwork is highly refined and precise, and his coloration is notable for its extreme technical difficulty.

Beijing's Yuan Center included his work in After Culture, a 2008 exhibition that also featured paintings of older, more famous Chinese artists like Ma Kelu, Shang Yang, Ding Fang, and Ma Lu.
