= Gong Liu =

Nobleman of ancient China

Gōng Liú
- Children: Qingjie
- Parent: Ji Ju

Duke Liu (traditional Chinese: 公劉; simplified Chinese: 公刘; pinyin: Gōng Liú) was a noble of ancient China. He was an important early leader of the Ji clan, which later founded the Zhou dynasty. His father was Ji Ju.

== Ancestry ==
In Chinese mythology, the Zhou lineage traditionally began with a consort of the Emperor Ku, who miraculously conceived "the Abandoned One" after stepping into a divine footprint. His son Buzhu was said to be displeased with the decadence of the Xia court and to have resigned his post as director of agriculture, moving the clan to Tai. Either Buzhu or his heir Ji Ju abandoned agriculture entirely and enjoyed living the nomadic lifestyle of their Rong and Di barbarian neighbors.

== History ==
Gong Liu was credited with restoring agriculture among his people and leading them to their subsequent prosperity. He led his people away from their new home at Tai to a new place called Bin, where they prospered at the expense of neighboring Rong tribes. His son was Qingjie. He used natural resources from across the Wei River to build storages for travellers and farmers. Many aristocrats embraced his leadership and moved to the area looking for protection.

After Zhou’s defeat of the Shang at Muye and the establishment of the Kingdom of Zhou, Gong Liu was commemorated with an ode among the Great Hymns in the Chinese classic Book of Songs. This ode tells the story of the preparations and move to Bin.

== See also ==
- Book of Songs
- Ancestry of the Zhou dynasty
