= Wugong County =

Coordinates: 34°16′20″N 108°06′30″E

Wugong County 武功县 Wukung
- County
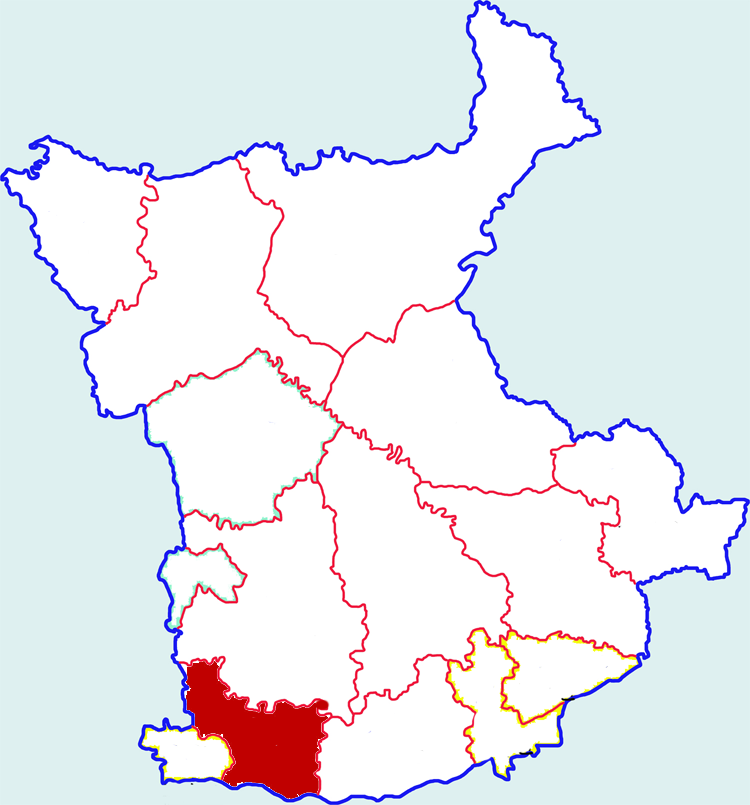
- Wugong in Xianyang

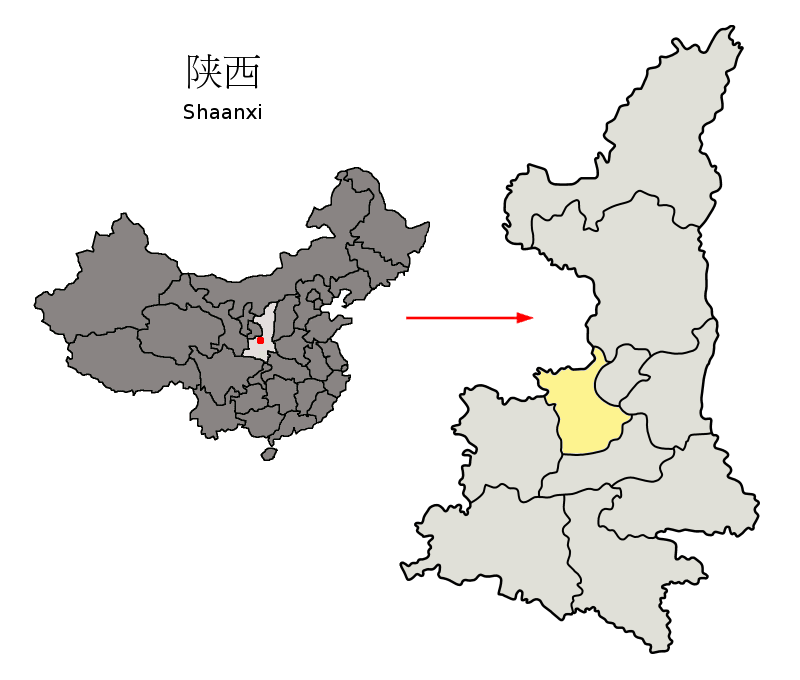
- Xianyang in Shaanxi
- Country: People's Republic of China
- Province: Shaanxi
- Prefecture-level city: Xianyang

Area
  - Total: 397.8 km^{2} (153.6 sq mi)

Population (2019)
  - Total: 414,800
  - Density: 1,043/km^{2} (2,701/sq mi)
- Time zone: UTC+8 (China standard time)
- Postal Code: 712200

Wugong County
- Traditional Chinese: 武功縣
- Simplified Chinese: 武功县
Transcriptions
Standard Mandarin
- Hanyu Pinyin: Wǔgōng xiàn
- Wade–Giles: Wu-kung Hsien

Wugong County is a county under the administration of the prefecture-level city of Xianyang in the central part of Shaanxi Province, China.

== History ==
Wugong County is the site of several settlements of prehistoric China. According to Chinese legend, under the Xia, the city or state of Tai in Wugong was the ancestral home of the Ji family, the royal line of the Zhou dynasty, before the clan relocated to Bin.

== Administrative divisions ==
As of 2016, this county is divided to 8 towns.

Towns

- Puji (普集镇)
- Sufang (苏坊镇)
- Wugong (武功镇)
- Youfeng (游风镇)
- Zhenyuan (贞元镇)
- Changning (长宁镇)
- Xiaocun (小村镇)
- Dazhuang (大庄镇)

== Climate ==
Climate data for Wugong, elevation 471 m (1,545 ft), (1991–2020 normals, extremes 1981–2010)
Month	Jan	Feb	Mar	Apr	May	Jun	Jul	Aug	Sep	Oct	Nov	Dec	Year
Record high °C (°F)	18.4 (65.1)	18.9 (66.0)	28.1 (82.6)	32.3 (90.1)	37.7 (99.9)	40.3 (104.5)	39.6 (103.3)	39.3 (102.7)	36.8 (98.2)	32.0 (89.6)	25.4 (77.7)	24.4 (75.9)	40.3 (104.5)
Mean daily maximum °C (°F)	5.2 (41.4)	9.3 (48.7)	15.2 (59.4)	21.6 (70.9)	26.4 (79.5)	31.3 (88.3)	32.2 (90.0)	29.9 (85.8)	24.9 (76.8)	19.2 (66.6)	12.7 (54.9)	6.8 (44.2)	19.6 (67.2)
Daily mean °C (°F)	−0.2 (31.6)	3.5 (38.3)	9.0 (48.2)	15.0 (59.0)	19.8 (67.6)	24.8 (76.6)	26.7 (80.1)	24.7 (76.5)	19.7 (67.5)	13.8 (56.8)	7.1 (44.8)	1.3 (34.3)	13.8 (56.8)
Mean daily minimum °C (°F)	−4.1 (24.6)	−0.8 (30.6)	4.1 (39.4)	9.5 (49.1)	14.1 (57.4)	19.0 (66.2)	22.0 (71.6)	20.7 (69.3)	16.0 (60.8)	10.0 (50.0)	3.1 (37.6)	−2.7 (27.1)	9.2 (48.6)
Record low °C (°F)	−14.0 (6.8)	−10.6 (12.9)	−6.8 (19.8)	−0.3 (31.5)	3.4 (38.1)	9.7 (49.5)	15.8 (60.4)	13.1 (55.6)	7.2 (45.0)	−3.0 (26.6)	−6.8 (19.8)	−17.7 (0.1)	−17.7 (0.1)
Average precipitation mm (inches)	6.2 (0.24)	9.5 (0.37)	25.1 (0.99)	39.6 (1.56)	56.7 (2.23)	69.3 (2.73)	83.8 (3.30)	110.5 (4.35)	101.4 (3.99)	55.2 (2.17)	19.6 (0.77)	4.4 (0.17)	581.3 (22.87)
Average precipitation days (≥ 0.1 mm)	3.4	4.1	6.4	6.7	9.1	8.8	9.0	9.6	11.7	9.8	5.5	2.9	87
Average snowy days	4.0	3.0	1.3	0.1	0	0	0	0	0	0	1.1	2.2	11.7
Average relative humidity (%)	64	64	64	67	67	64	71	79	82	80	74	67	70
Mean monthly sunshine hours	104.6	114.6	149.8	177.0	195.6	190.7	194.5	165.1	127.1	113.6	115.6	110.1	1,758.3
Percentage possible sunshine	33	37	40	45	45	44	45	40	35	33	38	36	39
Source: China Meteorological Administration
