= Wuming Painting Collective =

About the Wuming Painting Collective

The Wuming Painting Collective (also translated as No Name Painting Association or Anonymous Painting Group, simplified Chinese: 无名画会; traditional Chinese: 無名畫會) was an underground counter-culture Chinese art collective and movement formed in 1969.

Based in Beijing and comprising some 13 male and female artists between the ages of 16 and 30, the collective was characterized by its plein air practice of painting in public parks, urban centers and rural settings. The group is considered the first self-organized art collective of the Cultural Revolution.

At a time when Chinese art in the Mao period, particularly during the Cultural Revolution, turned into pure political propaganda, and normal self-expression and "art for art's sake" practice were forbidden both in institutional settings and for individual artists, the Wuming staged their own rebellion by painting non-political subjects on small, easily concealed sheets of paper or cardboard, and shown only to the most trusted of friends. Notably, the Wuming also painted self-portraits and portraits of their friends and fellow artists, as well as still-life quotidien scenes inside their apartments. A 1971 painting by Li Shan of two discarded soda bottles in a field is considered one of the first post-modern Chinese artworks, and is in the permanent collection of the Shanghai Museum of Contemporary Art.

The Wuming had their first clandestine private exhibition in 1974 in artist Zhang Wei's Beijing apartment. In the spring of 1979, they staged the first public exhibition of unofficial art in China in Beihai Park.

Though the group lacked formal leadership, early members Zhao Wenliang (b. 1937, Chinese: 赵文量) and Yang Yushu (b.1944, Chinese: 杨雨澍) provided the Wuming with significant guidance and direction.

While the majority of the collective's artwork featured apolitical subject matter, modern artistic commentaries stress the group's lack of support for the Cultural Revolution and independent, clandestine formation as evidence for its subversive nature. The Wuming focus on landscapes and everyday urban scenes despite the ongoing political turmoil of the time has been labeled "antirealist" by some art historians.

The group's first exhibit outside of China was 2011's Blooming In the Shadows at New York's China Institute. During the exhibit, members of the Wuming staged a paint-in in New York's Central Park, painting in plein air style much as they had during the Cultural Revolution.

A documentary about the Wuming, The No Name Painting Association, was produced in 2013, with narration by Jane Alexander, Lucy Liu and B.D. Wong.

== Notable Members ==
- Zhao Wenliang (Chinese: 赵文量)
- Yang Yushu (Chinese: 杨雨澍)
- Ma Kelu (Chinese: 馬可魯)
- Zhang Wei (Chinese: 張偉)

== Contemporary exhibitions ==
- 2006 No Name Group Retrospective, TRA Gallery (Gao Minglu), Beijing and Shanghai
- 2011 Blooming In the Shadows: Unofficial Chinese Art 1974-1985, China Institute, New York.
- 2013 Light Before Dawn: Unofficial Chinese Art 1974–1985, Asia Society, Hong Kong
- 2014 The Un-Officials | Art Before 85, Boers Li Gallery, Beijing
- 2018 Crescent: Retrospectives of Zhao Wenliang and Yang Yushu, Beijing Inside-Out Art Museum, Beijing
- 2021 Group Dynamics: Collectives of the Modern Period, Lenbachhaus Munich, Germany

== See also ==
- Cultural Revolution
- Chinese Art
- Censorship in China
