= Zhang Wei (painter) =

Chinese painter

Zhang Wei (Chinese: 張偉, born 1952) is a Chinese painter and an important figure in the development of abstract art in postmodern China. Widely considered one of the founding members of the self-organized group of young painters known as the No Name Group, he continues to create abstract art today.

== Early life ==
Born in Beijing, China, in 1952 to a wealthy family, Zhang Wei grew up in the old style courtyard home of his paternal grandfather—a successful businessman—with his mother and siblings. During The Cultural Revolution, the Red Guard destroyed the courtyard, and his grandmother was beaten to death and her possessions burned. Zhang's father died in prison in 1968. In the same year, Wei was forced to go to the Xiangluo production bridge in the Shanxi province to become an "educated youth". Due to work-related injuries, Zhang was sent back to Beijing for further treatment in 1971 and began to learn to paint on his own.

== Career ==
=== 1973–1986 ===
After returning to Beijing, he met artists Ma Kelu, Waihai, Zheng Ziyan, and Shi Xixi in 1973; he later became acquainted later with Zhao Wenliang, Yang Yushu, and Shi Zhenyu. Together, they formed an artist group known as the Yu Yuan Tan School of Painting. They would gather in different parks in Beijing painting en plein air. In December 1974, these artists held a quasi-underground exhibition Eleven Artists at Zhang Wei's house, establishing the foundation for the No Name Group.

Throughout the entire 1970s, Zhang Wei painted from life – mostly landscape and still life. In the early 1980s, he became one of the very few young artists in Beijing who made the earliest attempt at abstract painting. In May 1986, Zhang Wei and friends organized the Graffiti Exhibition which one closed down by the police before it had a chance to open due to the ‘transgressive’ nature of the exhibits. This great disappointment urged active artists at the time to leave the country. Soon after Zhang Wei traveled to America to participate in Avant-Garde Chinese Art, an exhibition organized by Michael Murray from Vassar College. New York had since become his home for the next sixteen years to come.

=== New York period (1986–2005) ===
Shortly after arriving in New York, Zhang Wei first started working with Carolyn Hill gallery and subsequently Z Gallery, producing abstract art inspired by the street scenes of Manhattan. Their collaboration ended in 1992. He moved to The West Village, making a living not by painting but by working an assortment of odd jobs. In the later years of Zhang Wei's New York days, he was active in fighting for the right for artists to sell their art on the streets. He participated in multiple protests, including the famous demonstration for the freedom of speech at the Metropolitan Museum in 1997. Zhang and his friends fought their ‘first amendment right’ fervently up to the Supreme Court, where in 2003 their art was recognized as a protected form of free speech, a precedent that still has validity today.

=== Returning to Beijing ===
Zhang Wei returned to Beijing in September 2005 and continued to be engaged in abstract painting. He picked up his work where he had left it twenty years earlier, combining abstract painting with found objects in an assemblage style. Zhang's first complete retrospective showcasing his abstract paintings from 1979 to 2012 took place at Boers-Li Gallery in Beijing in 2012, initiating a trend of rediscovering the dawn of Chinese contemporary art.

== Recent projects ==
In the beginning of 2018, he has subsequently participated in 2 group exhibition at Boers-Li Gallery in Beijing and Galerie Max Hetzler in Berlin and will be one of the three artists of a Chinese abstract art group show at Boers-Li Gallery, New York.

== Artistry ==
Zhang's oeuvre is described as pure executions of brushworks that created tension on canvas. Heavily influenced by his experience working at a Peking opera a theater, his abstract vocabulary is characterized by a blast of vibrant colors reminiscent of the movements of actors in their flamboyant traditional costumes. Other various visual elements introduced into his practice over time include Daoism philosophy and the notion of Chinese calligraphy.

== Important exhibitions and museum collections ==
Zhang's works have been the subject of important international exhibitions including M+ Sigg Collection: Four Decades of Chinese Contemporary Art at ArtisTree, Hong Kong (2016); Light before Dawn: Unofficial Chinese Art 1974–1985 at Asia Society, Hong Kong (2013); Blooming in the Shadows: Unofficial Chinese Art, 1974–1985 at China Institute Gallery, New York, USA (2011).

Zhang's 1984 oil on linen AC10 was acquired by The Art Institute of Chicago in 2005. In 2016, Hong Kong's M+ Museum of Visual Culture acquired four of his earlier works from mid-1970s and 1980s from Uli Sigg, the renowned Swiss collector of Chinese contemporary art.

== List of major works ==
- (1974) Red Stop Sign, The M+ Sigg Collection
- (1975) Fusuijing Building, The M+ Sigg Collection
- (1976) Loaders
- (1976) The Hall of Supreme
- (1981) EXPE10, The M+ Sigg Collection
- (1983) AB17, The M+ Sigg Collection
- (1984) AC 10, The Art Institute of Chicago
