= Ding Fang =

Chinese painter and curator (born 1956)

Ding Fang (Chinese: 丁方; born 1956 in Wugong County, Shaanxi) is a Chinese painter and curator. He graduated from the Nanjing Fine Arts Academy in 1986, with a Masters in oil painting, where he later taught for several years. After working both as a professional artist and on the editorial staff of Fine Arts in China Magazine, he moved in 2000 to the Institute of Fine Arts at Nanjing University, where he currently teaches. His work appeared in several prominent shows in China in the early 1980s. When political circumstances made it difficult for him to continue working as an independent artist, he began to exhibit in galleries in Sweden, Vienna, Los Angeles, London, Oxford, Sydney, and Rotterdam. In recent years his work has featured in many major Chinese exhibitions, including the Beijing Biennale in 2003 and The Wall: Reshaping Contemporary Chinese Art. He was the subject of a retrospective at the National Art Museum of China in 2002. The Yuan Center gallery in Beijing included several of his paintings in their recent exhibition, After Culture. Fang is known to be a member of the avant-garde movement.

== Curriculum vitae ==
=== Qualifications and experiences in art ===
1978-1982 Graduated from Nanjing Art Institute, Department of Arts and Crafts with a Bachelor of Arts degree

1983 Graduated from Nanjing Art Institute of Fine Arts

1986-1988 Worked for the Nanjing Arts Institute in the Fine Arts

1999 Was appointed a professor at Nanjing Art Institute in Sculpture

2000 Professor at the Art Institute of Nanjing University, Oil Teaching and Research Office, a visiting professor at the Nanjing Art Institute, director of China Oil Painting Society.

=== Community involvement ===
Zhongguo Meishubao is a weekly Chinese art newspaper published in Beijing from 1985 to 1989, featuring exhibitions, events and discussions on art throughout the country, at a time when the New Wave Art Movement was gaining immense attention. In 2004 Ding Fang generously donated a set of Zhongguo Meishubao (229 issues in 9 bound volumes) to the Asia Art Archive collection.

In October 1985, Ding Fang participated in and helped organize Jiangsu Youth Art Week's Modern Art Exhibit at Jiangsu Art Museum in Nanjing. The event attracted attention nationwide. During this exhibit he formed an art group called the 'Red Brigade', which held the 'Vanguard' exhibition in 1987. The Red Brigade Manifesto, written by him in 1987, explains his choice in the context of his tragic vision of human history, which is not so much a leap forward towards any greater purpose but an accumulation of ruins of grand dreams. The main themes of the Red Brigade Manifesto are: In the solemnity of self-sacrifice, we find common points of support, we thirst to re-create life in the depths of our hearts and in the course of our journey to the other shore, we reach the sublime and when we collide with eternity, we sense the call to mystery.

At the end of the 1980s many freelance artists gathered around Fuyuanmen Village, near Yuanmingyuan Palace in Beijing. Within 2 years dozen of artists have moved there such as Ding Fang, Fang Lijun, Wang Yina, Yi Ling, and Tian Bin. Together these artist organize group exhibitions in the village. The easy-going life, the uncertain future, and the freedom drew artists to this place, where it seemed they could realize a romantic dreamland and a poetic ideal. Among their ideals, the artistic spirit seemed to be in direct conflict with financial or material considerations. However, the appearance of the market economy had already transformed the political and social terrain of China, as exemplified by the "silicon valley", Zhongguancun, booming just south of Yuanmingyuan. This place was accruing wealth that was symbolic in China as the center of the information industry and as a casebook of successful economic development. The artists living in Yuanmingyuan confronted this stronghold of the market economy on a daily basis, and most were disgusted by this environment.

=== The Color Red: Travel ===
"In June 1986, the year after the Jiangsu Exhibit, Ding Fang, Yang Zhilin, Shen Qin, Cao Xiaodong, Chai Xiaogang, Xu Lei, Xu Yihui, Guan Ce, and Yang Yingshen,"because of their shared style, banded together as a Surrealist group under the name The Color Red: Travel, and Ding fang wrote for the group "Sayings of the Color Red: Travel". In this document Ding Fang maintained that in this world people had lost the ability to conduct a dialogue because they are shrouded in loneliness. History was without beginning and end and was merely a process of endless repetition and replication, which was a declaration revealing the path of creativity for mankind. Ding Fang stressed the western sacrificial spirit of Sisyphus. He told artists, "Our inner conscience continues to choose to engage in the action of pushing the rock uphill; this action originates in the hope we can glean from the depths of despair"."

== Themes and style ==
Ding Fang is known primarily for his bold, richly colored landscape paintings, in which he attempts to represent China's mountains and plains with historical and cultural meanings. Contrastingly, his depictions of urban life are dark and dystopian. His later works show expressive elements but also show an inclination toward his Christian religious beliefs. He uses a combination of abstract expressionism and surrealism to make his commentary on current materialism and urbanization. He traveled widely during his studies visiting many remote areas such as the Yellow Earth Plateau, Datong and the Taihang mountains.

In 1984, series of paintings called "City" inspired by his encounters with the rugged landscapes and cultural ruins of northern China. His monumental abandoned earth-colored cities yield the symbolic pulsating energy of bygone cultures in the series Sword-Shaped Willpower. This trajectory suggests an escape from the present to find more eternal values in ancient culture and in the vigorous life depicted in his earlier pictures such as Harvest. Painting therefore takes on a religious overtone in this Sisyphean cycle of human endeavor. This sense of tragedy and religious fatalism becomes more overt and apocalyptic in the paintings completed when he lived in the artists' village next to the Yuanmingyuan.

Ding Fang's first artistic endeavors, beginning between 1982 and 1985, worked with rustic realist painting. His rustic paintings showed the true lives of the ordinary people. He sought to explore the rational structure of nature through images of the constant stillness of the land and depictions of the cycle of human life. In these paintings the land seems covered by solid metal.

In 1985, he abandoned rustic themes. He returned to the Yellow Plateau in his home province, and while there he shifted his attention away from capturing the essence of the land and the lives of the people who live on it. Instead, Ding sought a symbolic mode of expression that would strengthen national culture. His works representative of this stage are the paintings entitled the "Castle Series" (1985). They depict the land of the Yellow Plateau turned to ruined castles and combined with parts of the Great Wall and villages. Ding Fang describes his pursuits of this period by saying, "I have been looking for a spirit hidden in the northern world." He uses styles of surrealism and symbolism to allude to a type of religious manifestation.

== Monumental works (as described by Lu Peng) ==
=== Early works ===
"The earliest monumental works of Ding Fang were "Fighting drought" and the series titled "Harvest". Ding Fang's understanding of heavy color and brush strokes was drawn from his own experience of life and the influence of Georges Rouault. If the oil paintings in the "Fighting drought" series reflected how the artist's dialogue remained at the stage of pure first love, then the "Walls" series that he began at the end 1984 was a clear expression of a more metaphysical introspection on culture. Because the artist's spiritual understanding inclined towards an ore transcendental nature, the details of nature in his works tended to diminish progressively and the atmosphere he created through his composition and color also moved in the direction of Surrealism. In his "Walls" series, Ding Fang expressed his alternate consciousness of history and reality. The artist could sense the magnificence of history while at the same time being perceptually alive to the precipitation primitive culture planted within the national spirit. By way of contrast, reality was a wasteland. When his characters encounter some grand historical monument from the past standing in the wasteland and are buffeted by the winds of cold reality, they are moved naturally to tears. In a later painting in the series the ruins of the building resembling a cathedral no longer appeared like a fortress on the loess plateau; instead it could be regarded as the artist's geometrically accurate treatment of the angles of the line of the moat and of the regularity of the battlements provided the initial clue for the modeling of the sword in the painting."

=== Leaving the Fortress ===
"After he completed "Leaving the fortress", the illusory sense that history and nature induced in the artist's soul still continued to influence his work, and led him to paint a series of magic-realist works. The series title "The call and birth" was the full embodiment of this style, its most important characteristic being that the turning of the earth bore the image of an enormous mask, and the shape of the mountain fortress was more solid and succinct. Through these images he artist explained that even though the surface of the land suggested that the earth was utterly exhausted, it concealed a powerful latent vitality which, when addressed with the eyes of history, will speak. The artist has anthropomorphized the earth and created it as a historical "mask" that can breathe, sigh or even emit a deafening roar."

=== The Strength of Tragedy ===
"In 1987, the artist completed his series titled "The strength of tragedy". In the second work in this series, subtitles "Sacrifice", we see a typical image of the sacrifice of Christ, through which the artist attempts to show a consummate portrayal of solemn and stirring sacrifice. In the artist's eyes, the "life of personal sacrifice in flames" is "a symbol of the resurrection of the soul". The third work in this series is symbolic of the ascension of the soul of the artist. At this stage in the series titled "The strength of tragedy", Ding Fang transformed his love of nature into the spirit of Christ's sacrifice, and accompanying this religiosity he began to reiterate an ascetic spirit."

== Influences ==
The book "Famous Paintings of the World" by Liu Haisu in 1932

His Christian faith.

In 1984 Ding Fang traveled to Tibet. Following his time in Tibet his paintings since the 1990s have been heavy landscapes done in oil that are suggestive of Tibet and dark cities.
