= Yuan Center =

Arts center in Beijing, China

The Yuan Center of Art (Chinese: 北京元艺术中心) is a multifunctional arts center and gallery located in the Haidian District, Beijing, China. The center houses four large exhibition halls for visual art, an experimental theatre, conference and symposia spaces, and a restaurant. The design concept of the building integrates the elements of architectural minimalism with a traditional Chinese construction pattern called "jiugongge" (九宫格). A recent show, entitled After Culture: An Exhibition of Contemporary Chinese Painting, featured the work of several major Chinese artists, including Ma Kelu, Shang Yang, Ma Lu, Ding Fang, and Peng Si. It was curated by Peng Feng, the prominent art critic and Professor of Aesthetics at Peking University, who also serves on the Yuan Center's directorial board.

The Yuan Center is a leading exhibitor of contemporary Chinese art.
