= Ji Ju =

- Issue: Gong Liu
- Father: Buzhu

Ji Ju (Chinese: 姬鞠) was a noble of the Chinese Xia dynasty.

He is reported as having abandoned the agriculture of his father Buzhu and grandfather Houji in favor of the animal husbandry practiced by the Xirong and Beidi peoples.

His son was Duke Liu, from whom the royal family of the Zhou dynasty descended.
