= Yang Yushu =

Chinese painter (born 1944)

- 杨雨澍
- Born: 1944 (age 81–82); Beijing, China
- Known for: Painting
- Movement: Yuyuantan School of Painting, No Name (Wuming) Group

Yang Yushu (Chinese: 杨雨澍; born 1944 in Beijing) is a Chinese painter, recognized for his contributions to the Yuyuantan School of Painting and as a central figure in the No Name (Wuming) Group. His work provides insights into China's social and artistic transformations since the 1950s.

== Biography ==
Born in Beijing in 1944, Yang Yushu was fascinated with painting from a young age. He formally began his painting career in 1962. He met his mentor Zhao Wenliang in the late 1950s and their mentorship evolved into a lifelong friendship. Despite financial struggles, Yang remained dedicated to his art.

== Artistic career ==
Yang's career, spanning over sixty years, is marked by his affiliation with the Yuyuantan School of Painting and the No Name Group. His work, often described as aesthetic, modernist, impressionist, and Matisse-inspired, reflects the historical and artistic discourse in China since the 1950s. He developed a distinctive style characterized by bright colors, elegant structures, and bold brushstrokes.

== Legacy and exhibitions ==
Yang's retrospective "Engraved Time, Diffused Memories" in 2021 showcased over 300 paintings, marking his first comprehensive solo exhibition. His work has been part of significant exhibitions, including "Crescent: Retrospectives of Zhao Wenliang and Yang Yushu" in Beijing (2018). His affiliation with the No Name (Wuming) Group, formed as a collective dedicated to exploring the essence of pure art and artistic expression beyond mainstream constraints, further solidifies his position in modern Chinese art history.

== Artistic Influence and Style ==
Yang's work is known for transcending visual reality to express sensory experiences, transforming traditional themes into expressions of attitude and emotion. Yang, along with Zhao Wenliang, has been instrumental in shaping modern Chinese art, moving away from socialist realism to a more personal and universal aesthetic.
