= Zhao Wenliang =

Chinese painter (1937–2019)

- 赵文量
- Born: 1937; Harbin, China
- Died: 10 November 2019 (aged 81–82); Beijing, China
- Known for: Painting
- Movement: Yuyuantan School of Painting, No Name (Wuming) Group

Zhao Wenliang (Chinese: 赵文量; 1937–2019) was a Chinese painter best known for his roles in the Yuyuantan School of Painting and as a foundational member of the No Name (Wuming) Group.

== Biography ==
Born in 1937 in Harbin, Zhao Wenliang moved to Beijing in 1954, where he began his painting career. In the late 1950s he formed close associations with fellow artists, including Yang Yushu and Shi Zhenyu, often painting en plein air in the suburbs of Beijing, which led to the formation of the "Yuyuantan School of Painting". Zhao became a pioneering and influential figure in the No Name Group, officially established in 1979. At the age of 82, Zhao Wenliang died on November 10, 2019, in Beijing.

== Exhibitions ==
- 1979 – Beijing, China – Beijing Beihai Park Painted Boat House, The 1st No Name (Wuming) Group Works Exhibition
- 2004 – Beijing, China – National Art Museum of China, Zhao Wenliang and Yang Yushu Oil Painting Exhibition
- 2018 – Beijing, China – Beijing Inside-Out Art Museum, Crescent: Retrospectives of Zhao Wenliang and Yang Yushu
