= Tai (city) =

Chinese city

Coordinates: 34°16′20″N 108°06′30″E

- Traditional Chinese: 邰 or 斄
- Simplified Chinese: 邰 or 𭤎
Transcriptions
Standard Mandarin
- Hanyu Pinyin: Tái
- Wade–Giles: T'ai

Tai was an ancient settlement of the Chinese Xia dynasty located in present-day Wugong County, Shaanxi.

Tai was the ancestral home of the Ji clan, later the ruling house of the Zhou dynasty. According to Sima Qian, the Xia director of agriculture Buzhu removed his clan from Tai when he left his office, preferring to live among the nomadic Rong and Di tribes. The clan next settled at Bin.
