= Bin (city) =

Chinese settlement during the Xia and Shang dynasties

Bin (traditional Chinese: 豳; simplified Chinese: 彬; pinyin: Bīn) was a Chinese settlement during the Xia and Shang dynasties. It was said to be located between the Rong and Di ethnic groups. It was located in present day Xunyi County and is the modern namesake of Binzhou in Shaanxi.

Bin was the ancestral home of the Ji clan after Buzhu moved them from Tai after resigning his post in the Xia. The clan maintained control over the settlement until King Tai of Zhou removed them again and led his people to Zhou along the Wei River.

The rulers of Bin were listed as Qingjie, Huangpu (皇仆), Chaifu (差弗), Huiyu (毀隃), Gongfei (公非), Gaoyu (高圉), Yayu (亞圉), and Gongshu Zulei (公叔祖類).

== See also ==
- Bin County, Shaanxi
- Zhou dynasty
