= Ma Kelu =

Chinese painter (born 1954)

- Born: 8 April 1954 (age 72); Shanghai, China
- Education: Beijing Culture House studio program (1972-1973); Skowhegan School of Painting and Sculpture (1989); SUNY Empire State College (1989-1990)

Ma Kelu
- Traditional Chinese: 馬可魯
- Simplified Chinese: 马可鲁
Transcriptions

Ma Kelu (born April 8, 1954, Shanghai) is a Chinese painter. He first rose to prominence in the late 1970s and early 1980s as a member of a circle of largely self-taught, underground artists based in Beijing, who worked in direct contravention of the Chinese government's official sponsorship of Socialist Realism. After the crackdown against Avant-garde artists during the Anti-Spiritual Pollution Campaign in 1986, he began to show his paintings in the galleries of Berlin, New York, Boston, London, and Vancouver. In 2006, Kelu's work was featured in Beijing, curated by internationally renowned Chinese art historian and critic, Gao Minglu.

== Life and works ==
Ma Kelu is an artist who "has always kept away from the mainstream and has never compromised, whether at home or abroad," said painter and critic Chen Danqing. Due to an unfortunate occurrence during Kelu's early years, he never received formal painting classes and was unable to afford proper drawing materials. Despite poverty, his family was very supportive and saved every penny to buy Kelu the necessary tools to paint.

Ma Kelu moved to Beijing with his father in 1960 and entered primary school in 1961. In 1968, he entered the Beijing 23 Secondary School and started painting with Chan Fosheng as his teacher. In 1969, he got to know Wei Hai and Zhou Maiyou and together they discussed art. He was sent down to a village in 1970. He returned to Beijing in 1972 and worked in the Chaoyangmennei Restaurant, managed by the Food and Drinks Company of the Eastern District. In 1972-73, he met Zhang Wei, Li Shan, Shi Xixi, Zheng Ziyan, Bao Lean, Wei Hai, and Wang Aihe, and they regularly went out to paint together. In 1974, he worked in the mechanical maintenance group of the Food and Drinks Company. In the same year, he met Zhao Wenliang, Yang Yushu, and Shi Zhenyu, and his painting style was influenced by Wenliang and Yushu. He also participated in an underground art exhibition of what was to become the Wuming (No Name) Painters Group. The exhibition was held at the home of Zhang Wei (room 305, Fusuijing Building, Beijing). He then participated in the first and second public exhibitions of the Wuming Painters Group in Beijing in 1979 and 1981 respectively. He resigned from his work to become a freelance artist in September 1984. In early 1988, he traveled to Germany, Sweden, and Denmark. He settled in New York at the end of October. In 1989, he was offered a scholarship to study art at the Painting and Sculpting School in Maine. In 1989 and 1990, he studied in the Arts Department, at Empire State College, State University of New York. He moved back to Beijing in 2006 and set up a studio in Beigao, the rural part of Beijing. Painting, precisely speaking, is where Ma Kelu's interest lies. He sees himself as a “growing artist,” who holds an open-minded and studious attitude with adaptive and creative abilities.

Kelu enjoys painting because it has brought him an immense amount of joy. Spending time painting brought him comfort, offered him the opportunity to express himself, and allowed him an escape from reality during the time of the Cultural Revolution. Between 1970 and 1972, Kelu was sent to the countryside to do manual labor along with many of his peers. Besides being forced to toil in the fields, he often had to walk two miles to paint, to avoid the suspicious eyes in his village. In the wilderness, landscapes became a major theme of his painting. Returning to Beijing, he gradually became close with a group of other self-taught young painters. These painters, like Kelu, were tired of the dominance of socialist-realist art. They often gathered together in parks or the suburbs to paint landscapes. To avoid being noticed and to make their tools more portable, they modified small toolboxes into all-in-one painting kits. As a result, most of their paintings were small, normally about 60 square inches each.

=== Life in America ===
In the 1980s, Kelu decided to leave China to see the world and when he left China, his artwork started to change. He began to work on abstract art. Kelu did not paint much outdoors and worked almost exclusively in a studio. Living in a foreign country was not easy. Persisting on his art and his dream of keeping his studios, he made his living by sketching on the streets of New York City. Kelu was not able to find huge success by selling his abstract art and so he relied on some old paintings of his that he had brought along with him during his travel to the States. He made photographic prints and sold them on the streets of New York. First, he found his fortune selling old paintings tough but gradually the situation improved and more and more people started asking Kelu for the originals. However, Kelu rejected any requests for the originals as those paintings were precious memories of the past, the jewels he keeps for himself. Kelu did not want to part ways with his paintings until one day when an elderly American couple insisted on buying his original works. Kelu understood that with his old paintings, he was able to bring about an emotion that was peaceful and calming for his clients. Kelu's works can give viewers hope in times of trouble and turmoil.

In 2006, Kelu moved back to China to provide a better living environment for his son, a young artist, and musician who was suffering from depression. Yet, in 2007, only two weeks after Kelu's father died, his son committed suicide. To overcome the pain and hurt of losing two close family members, Kelu created fierce works including abstract strokes and bright colors, his son's favorite colors.

=== Exhibitions ===
Ma Kelu's artwork has been exhibited in Asia, Canada, Europe, and the United States. Solo exhibitions include TRA Gallery, Beijing (2006), Crystal Foundation Art Gallery, New York (2005), Gallery Z, Buffalo, New York (1996), Gallery 456, Soho, New York (1995), China Gallery, Berling (1993), GDCF, Berlin (1988).

Ma Kelu's work has been included in TRA Gallery, Beijing (2007), YQK Deshan Art Space, Beijing (2006-2007), Guangdong Museum, Guangzhou (2006-2007), Shanghai Zhengda Museum of Modern Art, Shanghai (2006-2007), Tshue Chen Gallery, New York (2006), The First Exhibition of the American Research Association of Eastern and Western Arts, New York (2005), Stewart Center Art Gallery, Purdue University, USA (1998), Art Beatus Gallery, Vancouver (1997), The Rotunda Gallery, New York (1997), Nassau St. 116, New York (1997), Michael Goedhuis, London (1996), Lincoln Center, New York (1995), King Gallery, New York (1993), The Artist Museum of Loze, Poland (1992), Z Gallery, New York (1991, 1990), City College Art Gallery, New York (1989), Nilson Gallery, Boston (1988), New House Center for Contemporary Art, New York (1988), Thirty Artist, Beijing (1986), Jian Wai Gong Yu, Beijing (1985), Chao Yang Theater, Beijing (1985), 2nd Exhibition, Beihai Park, Beijing (1981), 1st Exhibition, Beihai Park, Beijing (1979), and Jingshan Park, Beijing (1978).

He has also exhibited in galleries at the 798 Art Zone, and Beijing's Yuan Center.

While he began, like the other members of the No Name Group, to paint in the post-Impressionist style that was outlawed in China during the Cultural Revolution, his later work tends towards minimalism and abstraction. He has also painted a recent series of large-scale landscapes in the classical Chinese style, which is then glazed over with a thick layer of wax to create an ethereal and distorted effect.

== Wuming Painting Group ==
The Wuming Painting Group was an early group of contemporary Chinese artists noted for experimentation with several late-19th and early-20th-century Western styles including Impressionism, Post-Impressionism, and Fauvism. Although their paintings do not appear particularly radical in their treatment of content or form, the very act of painting non-revolutionary subject matter in non-naturalistic styles was not accepted by the establishment at that time. Wuming comes from two generations, diverse class backgrounds, various working positions, and some pre-existing circles of close friends. Figures of the older generation have much in common: all were born before the establishment of the PRC; all came from families defined as “class enemies” by 1950; all took entrance examinations and were rejected by art schools or academies, and all learned art largely by themselves.

Most of the artists in this group made salaries between sixteen and forty yuan per month. They had no studios and little money for paint and canvas. Due to a limited budget, the group used paper from ordinary drawing paper costing twenty-five cents per sheet to thicker watercolor paper costing seventy-five, and they brushed boiled bone glue or gesso paste on it to prepare the surface. The group labored six days a week, eight hours plus two hours of political study per day. The only time they could paint was in the few hours after work and on their one-day off during the week.

A large proportion of their paintings are landscapes made in and out of Beijing, depicting mountains and water, flowers and trees, sunshine, and moonlight. They also painted human figures and still lifes. The Wuming group was exploring humanity, searching for qualities of compassion, empathy, and dignity in images of friends, neighbors, and strangers.

Their catalog includes thirteen volumes, each about a single artist. Paintings within each volume are centered on the Wuming period while stretching throughout the artist's career, thereby allowing the study of both group and individual development.

Members: Ma Kelu, Liu Shi, Shi Zhenyu (Founding Member), Shi Xixi, Tian Shuying, Wang Aihe, Wei Hai, Yang Yushu (Founding Member), Zhang Da'an (Founding Member), Zhao Wenliang (Founding Member), and Zheng Ziyan.

The Wuming Painting Group was active primarily from the mid-1960s to the late 1970s.

On July 7, 1979, the first public exhibition of the Wuming Painting Group opened in Beijing's Beihai Park.

=== Ma Kelu's involvement ===
Ma Kelu and his Wuming Group spent a lot of time painting and sketching outdoors because, at the time, there was no such concept as a “studio” for artists to work in. Since a lot of work was created outdoors, Ma Kelu became extremely sensitive to the divisions of day and night and the changing season. When he was young, he completed hundreds of paintings and these works brought him the strength and happiness to resist against the deadening political atmosphere. In the early 1970s, Ma Kelu and Wuming began painting from nature, haunting the streets of Beijing and Diaoyutai. Many of Ma Kelu's paintings have been paintings of bell towers, drum towers, Shishahai, or the Yinding Bridge because his home was close to these places. And his paintings reveal the noisy life of the city folk.

Between 1975 and 1977, the Wuming group painters often traveled to the seaside at Beidaihe to paint en Plein air, the group's primary medium of creation. Ma Kelu experienced some struggles as he and his groups were working on en Plein air paintings. For one, the seven-hour train ride from Beijing was a luxury for the poor artists. Moreover, Ma Kelu found it difficult to paint the sea. When painting the sea, the clear green water and the blue sky looked like a swimming pool and realistic renditions often looked fake. The conditions were challenging, as the strong offshore wind blew away the clouds and brought a scattering of dirt and sand. This created problems for smooth progress in the creation of his paintings.

== Quotes ==
“Life itself is an incident, perplexing, uncertain and helpless. Facing it is the only option”
