= Buzhu =

- Issue: Ji Ju
- Father: Hou Ji

Buzhu or Buku (Chinese: 不窋) was a legendary noble during the Xia dynasty in China. He was the son of the Xia minister of agriculture, Houji, and inherited his father's position under the Xia king Kong Jia, now estimated to have ruled around 1789–1758 BC. Feeling Kong Jia's court to be corrupt, he resigned his office and removed his clan from the capital to Tai. Either he or his son Ji Ju abandoned agriculture completely, enjoying the nomadic lifestyle of his Rong and Di neighbors instead.

As the son of Houji, he was claimed as an ancestor of the Zhou dynasty. His grandson was Gong Liu.

== See also ==
- Ancestry of the Zhou dynasty
