= Zhou dynasty =

Chinese dynasty from c. 1046 to 256 BC

Zhou 周
- c. 1046 – 256 BC
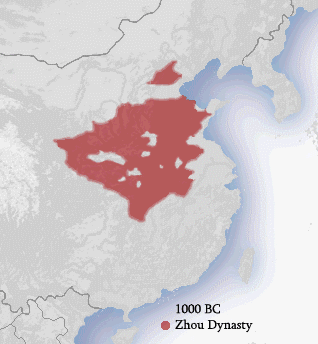
- Territory of the Western Zhou c. 1000 BC
- Capital: Fenghao (Note: Fenghao is the modern name for the twin city formed by the Western Zhou capitals of Haojing and Fengjing.) (1046–771 BC); Wangcheng (Note: The exact location of Wangcheng and its relation to Chengzhou is disputed. According to Xu Zhaofeng, "Chengzhou" and "Wangcheng" were originally synonymous and used to name the same capital city from 771 to 510 BC. "The creation of a distinction between Wangcheng and Chengzhou probably occurred during the reign of King Jing", under whom a new capital "Chengzhou" was built to the east of the old city "Wangcheng". Nevertheless, the new Chengzhou was still sometimes called Wangcheng and vice versa, adding to the confusion.) (771–510 BC; 314–256 BC); Chengzhou (510–314 BC)
- Common languages: Old Chinese
- Religion: Chinese folk religion; Ancestor veneration; Heaven worship
- Government: Monarchy
- King
  - c. 1046–1043 BC: Wu
  - 781–771 BC: You
  - 770–720 BC: Ping
  - 314–256 BC: Nan
- History
  - Battle of Muye: c. 1046 BC
  - Gonghe Regency: 841–828 BC
  - Battle of Mount Li and Relocation to Wangcheng: 771 BC
  - Deposition of King Nan by Qin: 256 BC
  - Fall of last Zhou holdouts: 249 BC

Population
  - 1000 BC: 13.7 million
  - 680 BC: 11.8 million
- Currency: Spade money
Preceded by	Succeeded by
Late Shang; Predynastic Zhou	Qin dynasty
- Today part of: China

Zhou
- "Zhou" in ancient bronze script (top), seal script (middle), and regular script (bottom) Chinese characters
- Chinese: 周
- Hanyu Pinyin: Zhōu
Transcriptions
Standard Mandarin
- Hanyu Pinyin: Zhōu
- Bopomofo: ㄓㄡ
- Wade–Giles: Chou^{1}
- Tongyong Pinyin: Jhou
- Yale Romanization: Jōu
- IPA: [ʈʂóʊ]
other Mandarin
- Xiao'erjing: ژَوْ
Wu
- Romanization: Tseu
Yue: Cantonese
- Yale Romanization: Jāu
- Jyutping: Zau1
- IPA: [tsɐw˥]
Southern Min
- Hokkien POJ: Chiu
- Tâi-lô: Tsiu
Old Chinese
- Baxter (1992): *tjiw
- Baxter–Sagart (2014): *tiw

The Zhou dynasty (/dʒoʊ/ JOH; Chinese: 周; pinyin: Zhōu, pronunciation: [ʈʂóʊ]) was a royal dynasty of China that existed for 790 years from c. 1046 BC until 256 BC, the longest span of any dynasty in Chinese history. During the Western Zhou period (c. 1046 – 771 BC), the royal house, surnamed Ji, had military control over territories centered on the Wei River valley and North China Plain. Even as Zhou suzerainty became increasingly ceremonial over the following Eastern Zhou period (771–256 BC), the political system created by the Zhou royal house survived in some form for several additional centuries. A date of 1046 BC for the Zhou's establishment is supported by the Xia–Shang–Zhou Chronology Project and David Pankenier, after David Nivison and Edward L. Shaughnessy had previously dated the establishment to 1045 BC.

The later Eastern Zhou period is itself roughly divided into two parts. During the Spring and Autumn period (c. 771 – c. 481 BC), power became increasingly decentralized as the authority of the royal house diminished. The Warring States period (c. 475 – 221 BC) that followed saw large-scale warfare and consolidation among what had formerly been Zhou client states, until the Zhou were formally extinguished by the state of Qin in 256 BC. The Qin ultimately founded the imperial Qin dynasty in 221 BC after conquering all of China.

The Zhou period is often considered to be the zenith for the craft of Chinese bronzeware. The later Zhou period is also famous for the advent of three major Chinese philosophies: Confucianism, Taoism and Legalism. The Zhou dynasty also spans the period when the predominant form of written Chinese became seal script, which evolved from the earlier oracle bone and bronze scripts. By the dynasty's end, an immature form of clerical script had also emerged.

== History ==
=== Foundation ===
==== Traditional myth ====
According to Chinese mythology, the Zhou lineage began when Jiang Yuan, a consort of the legendary Emperor Ku, miraculously conceived a child, Qi "the Abandoned One", after stepping into the divine footprint of Shangdi. Qi was a culture hero credited with surviving abandonment by his mother three times, and with greatly improving agriculture, to the point where he was granted lordship over Tai, the surname Ji, and the title Houji "Lord of Millet", by the Emperor Shun. He even received sacrifice as a harvest god. The term Houji was probably a hereditary title attached to a lineage.

Buzhu—Qi's son, or rather that of the Houji—is said to have abandoned his position as Agrarian Master (農師; Nóngshī) in old age and either he or his son Ju abandoned their tradition, living in the manner of the Xirong and Rongdi (see Hua–Yi distinction). Ju's son Liu, however, led his people to prosperity by restoring agriculture and settling them at a place called Bin, (Note: The exact location of Bin remains obscure, but it may have been close to Linfen on the Fen River in present-day Shanxi.) which his descendants ruled for generations. Tai later led the clan from Bin to Zhou, an area in the Wei River valley (modern Qishan County).

The duke passed over his two elder sons Taibo and Zhongyong to favor the younger Jili, a warrior in his own right. As a vassal of the Shang kings Wu Yi and Wen Ding, Jili went to conquer several Xirong tribes before being treacherously killed by Shang forces. Taibo and Zhongyong had supposedly already fled to the Yangtze delta, where they established the state of Wu among the tribes there. Jili's son Wen bribed his way out of imprisonment and moved the Zhou capital to Feng (present-day Xi'an). Around 1046 BC, Wen's son Wu and his ally Jiang Ziya led an army of 45,000 men and 300 chariots across the Yellow River and defeated Di Xin at the Battle of Muye, marking the beginning of the Zhou dynasty. (Note: Sima Qian was only able to establish historical dates after the time of the Gonghe Regency. Earlier dates, like that of 1046 BC for the Battle of Muye, are given in this article according to the Chinese government–sponsored Xia–Shang–Zhou Chronology Project, but they remain contentious. Various historians have offered dates for the battle ranging between 1122 and 1027 BC.) The Zhou enfeoffed a member of the defeated Shang royal family as the Duke of Song, which was held by descendants of the Shang royal family until its end. This practice was referred to as Er Wang San Ke.

==== Culture ====
According to Nicholas Bodman, the Zhou appear to have spoken a language largely similar in vocabulary and syntax to that of the Shang; a recent study by David McCraw, using lexical statistics, reached the same conclusion. The Zhou emulated Shang cultural practices, possibly to legitimize their own rule, and became the successors to Shang culture. At the same time, the Zhou may also have been connected to the Xirong, a broadly defined cultural group to the west of the Shang, which the Shang regarded as tributaries. For example, the philosopher Mencius (372–289 BC) acknowledged that King Wen of Zhou had ancestry from among the Xirong, as King Wen's descendants, the Zhou kings, claimed descent from Hou Ji, a legendary culture hero possibly related to the Xirong through his mother Jiang Yuan. Additionally, the late 4th-century BC Zuo Zhuan comments that the baron of Li Rong (驪戎男), after being defeated by Jin, married his daughter Li Ji off. (Note: Eastern Wu scholar-official Wei Zhao stated the Xianyu's rulers among the Beidi were also surnamed Ji.) According to historian Li Feng, the term "Rong" during the Western Zhou period was likely used to designate political and military adversaries rather than cultural and ethnic "others". Cultural artifacts of the Western Rong coexisted with Western Zhou bronzes, indicating close bonds between the Rong and the Western Zhou.

=== Western Zhou ===
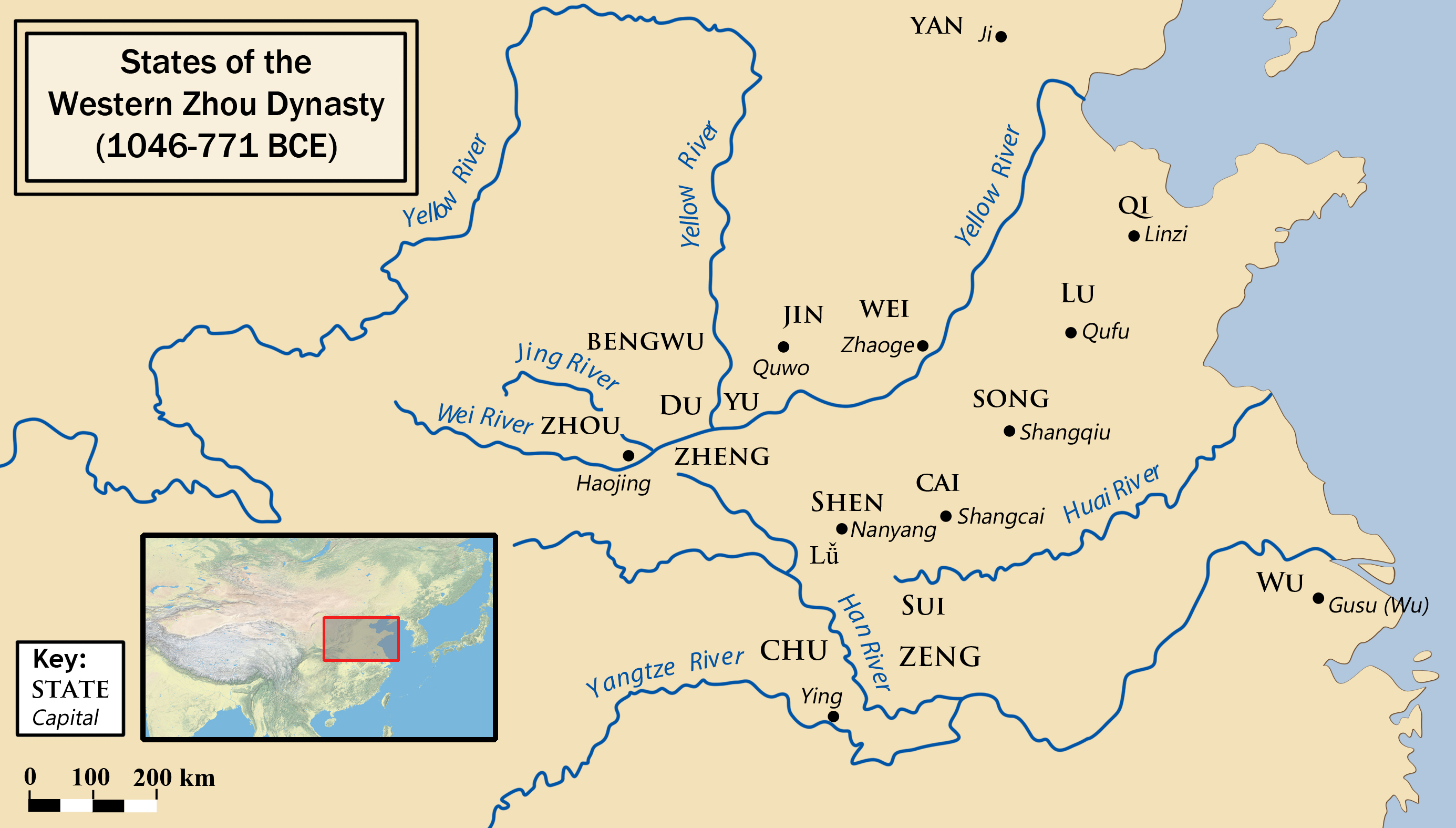
States of the Western Zhou dynasty

During the Western Zhou (1045–771 BC), King Wu maintained the old capital for ceremonial purposes but constructed a new one for his palace and administration nearby at Haojing. Although Wu's early death left a young and inexperienced heir, the Duke of Zhou assisted his nephew King Cheng in consolidating royal power. Wary of the Duke of Zhou's increasing power, the "Three Guards", Zhou princes stationed on the eastern plain, rose in rebellion against his regency. Even though they garnered the support of independent-minded nobles, Shang partisans, and several Dongyi tribes, the Duke of Zhou quelled the rebellion, and further expanded the Zhou Kingdom into the east. To maintain Zhou authority over its greatly expanded territory and prevent other revolts, he set up the fengjian system. Furthermore, he countered Zhou's crisis of legitimacy by expounding the doctrine of the Mandate of Heaven while accommodating important Shang rituals at Wangcheng and Chengzhou.

Over time, this decentralized system became strained as the familial relationships between the Zhou kings and the regional dynasties thinned over the generations. Peripheral territories developed local power and prestige on par with that of the Zhou.

The conflicts with nomadic tribes from the north and the northwest, variously known as the Xianyun, Guifang, or various "Rong" tribes, such as the Xirong, Shanrong or Quanrong, intensified towards the end of the Western Zhou period. These tribes are recorded as harassing Zhou territory, but at the time the Zhou were expanding northwards, encroaching on their traditional lands—especially the Wei River valley. Archaeologically, the Zhou expanded to the north and the northwest at the expense of the Siwa culture.

When King You demoted and exiled his Qiang queen in favor of the commoner Bao Si, the disgraced queen's father the Marquis of Shen joined with Zeng and the Quanrong. The Quanrong put an end to the Western Zhou in 771 BC, sacking the Zhou capital at Haojing and killing the last Western Zhou king You. With King You dead, a conclave of nobles met at Shen and declared the Marquis's grandson King Ping. The capital was moved eastward to Wangcheng, marking the beginning of the Eastern Zhou period.

=== Eastern Zhou ===
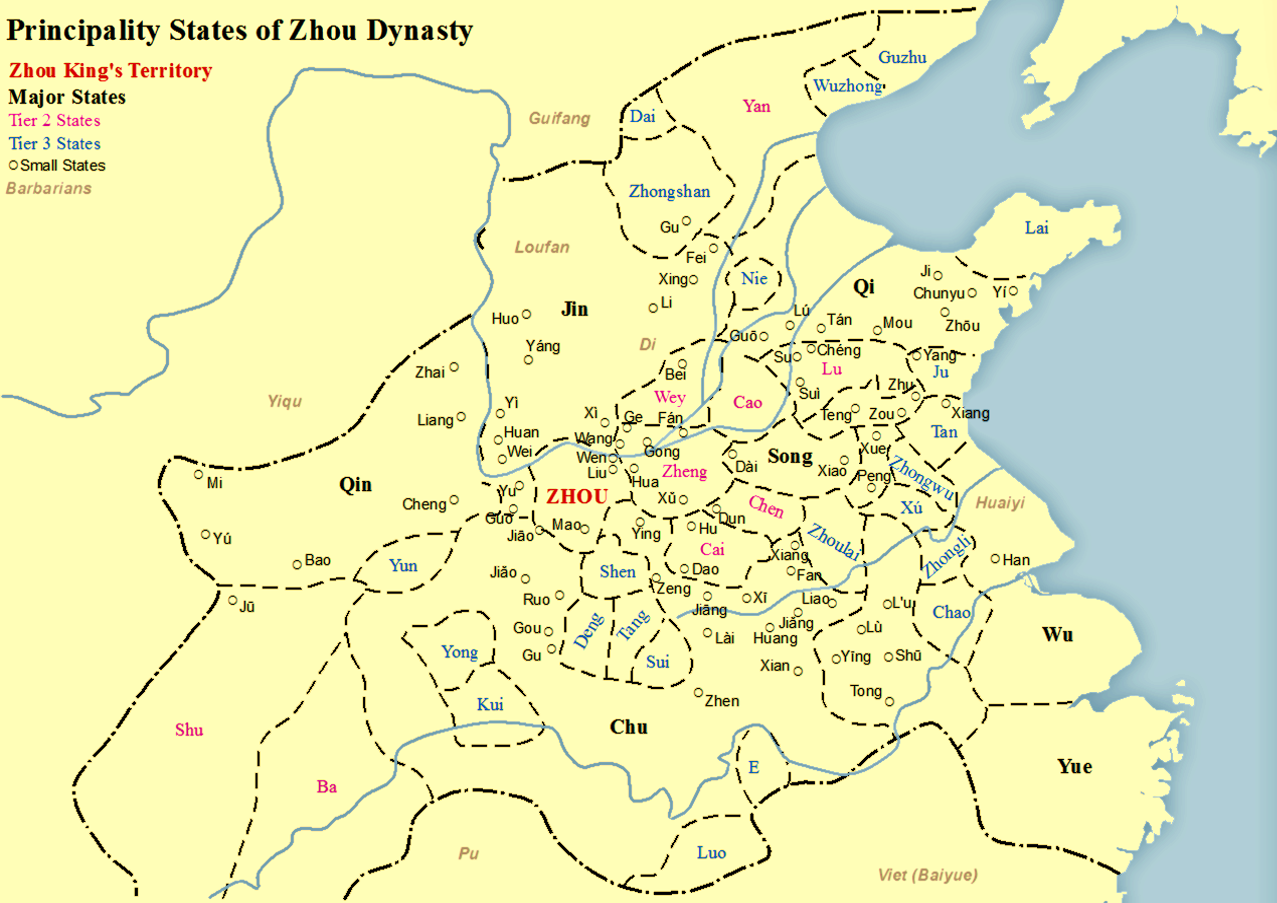
Major states during the Eastern Zhou

The Zhou dynasty and contemporary polities c. 500 BC

The Eastern Zhou period (771–256 BC) was characterized by an accelerating collapse of royal authority, although the king's ritual importance enabled more than five additional centuries of rule. The Spring and Autumn Annals, the Confucian chronicle of the early years of this process, gave the period its name as the Spring and Autumn period. The partition of Jin during the mid-5th century BC is a commonly cited as initiating the subsequent Warring States period. In 403 BC, the Zhou court recognized Han, Zhao, and Wei as fully independent states. In 344, Duke Hui of Wei was the first to claim the title of "king" for himself. Others followed, marking a turning point, as rulers did not even entertain the pretense of vassalage of the Zhou court, instead proclaiming themselves fully independent kingdoms. A series of states rose to prominence before each falling in turn, and in most of these conflicts Zhou was a minor player.

The last Zhou king is traditionally taken to be Nan, who was killed when Qin captured Wangcheng in 256 BC. Duke Wen of Eastern Zhou declared himself to be "King Hui", but his splinter state was fully disassembled by 249. Qin's wars of unification concluded in 221 BC with Qin Shi Huang's annexation of Qi.

The Eastern Zhou is also remembered as the golden age of Chinese philosophy: the Hundred Schools of Thought which flourished as rival lords patronized itinerant scholars is led by the example of Qi's Jixia Academy. The Nine Schools of Thought which came to dominate the others were Confucianism as interpreted by Mencius and others, Legalism, Taoism, Mohism, the utopian communalist Agriculturalism, two strains of the School of Diplomacy, the School of Names, Sun Tzu's School of the Military, and the School of Naturalists. While only the first three of these would receive imperial patronage in later dynasties, doctrines from each influenced the others and Chinese society in sometimes unusual ways. The Mohists for instance found little interest in their praise of meritocracy but much acceptance for their mastery of defensive siege warfare; much later, however, their arguments against nepotism were used in favor of establishing the imperial examination system.

== Culture and society ==
The Zhou heartland was the Wei River valley; this remained their primary base of power after conquering the Shang.

=== Mandate of Heaven ===
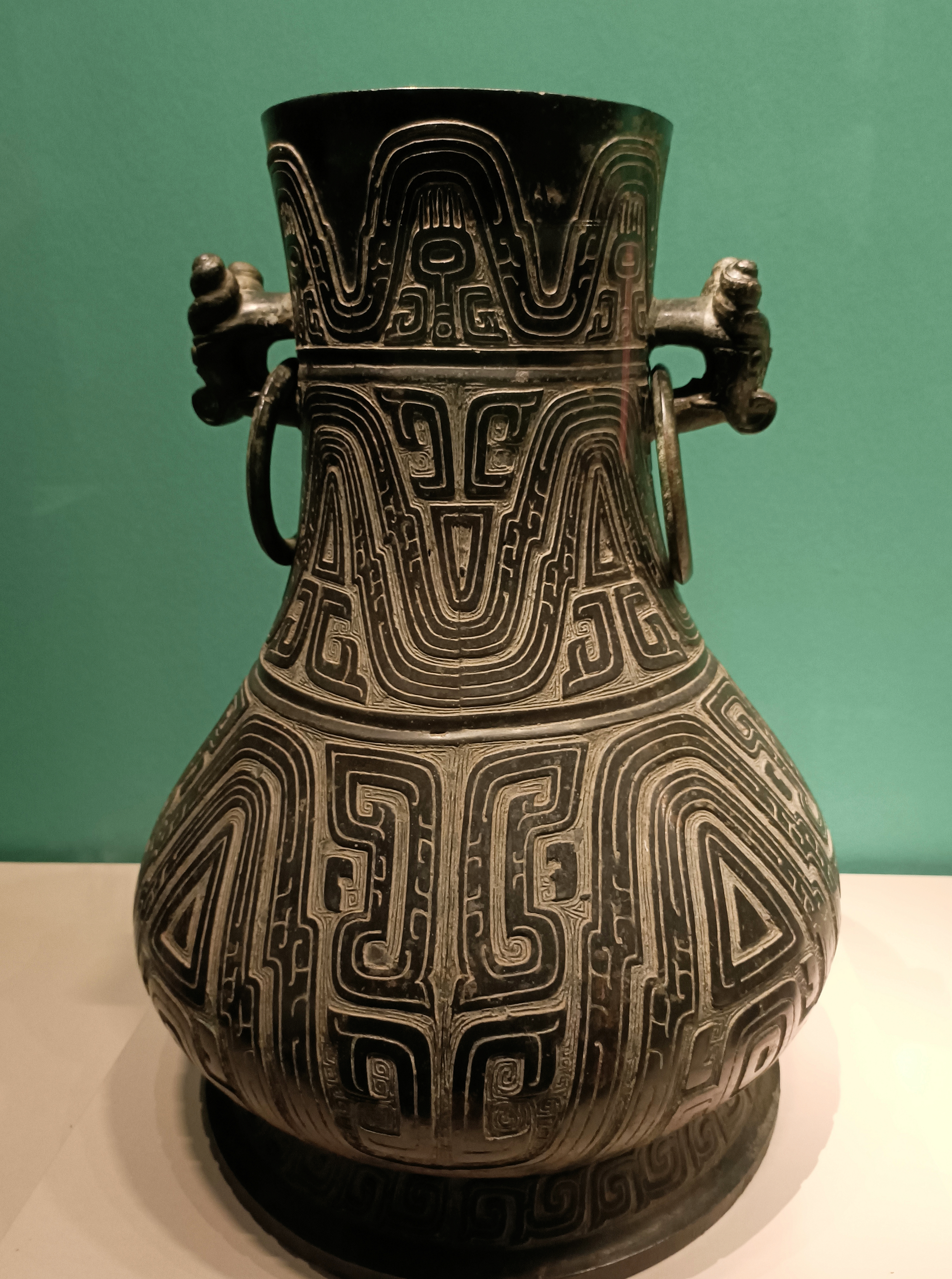
Western Zhou bronze pot (896 BC), Fufeng County, Shaanxi – Baoji Zhouyuan Museum

Zhou rulers introduced the Mandate of Heaven, which would prove to be among East Asia's most enduring political doctrines. According to the theory, Heaven imposed a mandate to replace the Shang with the Zhou, whose moral superiority justified seizing Shang wealth and territory in order to return good governance to the people.

The Mandate of Heaven was presented as a religious compact between the Zhou people and their supreme god in heaven. The Zhou agreed that since worldly affairs were supposed to align with those of the heavens, the heavens conferred legitimate power on only one person, the Zhou ruler. In return, the ruler was duty-bound to uphold heaven's principles of harmony and honor. Any ruler who failed in this duty, who let instability creep into earthly affairs, or who let his people suffer, would lose the mandate. Under this system, it was the prerogative of spiritual authority to withdraw support from any wayward ruler and to find another, more worthy one. In this way, the Zhou sky god legitimized regime change.

In using this creed, the Zhou rulers had to acknowledge that any group of rulers, even they themselves, could be ousted if they lost the mandate of heaven because of improper practices. The book of odes written during the Zhou period clearly intoned this caution.

The Zhou kings contended that heaven favored their triumph because the last Shang kings had been evil men whose policies brought pain to the people through waste and corruption. After the Zhou came to power, the mandate became a political tool.

One of the duties and privileges of the king was to create a royal calendar. This official document defined times for undertaking agricultural activities and celebrating rituals. But unexpected events such as solar eclipses or natural calamities threw the ruling house's mandate into question. Since rulers claimed that their authority came from heaven, the Zhou made great efforts to gain accurate knowledge of the stars and to perfect the astronomical system on which they based their calendar.

Zhou legitimacy also arose indirectly from Shang material culture through the use of bronze ritual vessels, statues, ornaments, and weapons. As the Zhou emulated the Shang's large scale production of ceremonial bronzes, they developed an extensive system of bronze metalworking that required a large force of tribute labor. Many of its members were Shang, who were sometimes forcibly transported to new Zhou to produce the bronze ritual objects which were then sold and distributed across the lands, symbolizing Zhou legitimacy.

=== Feudalism ===
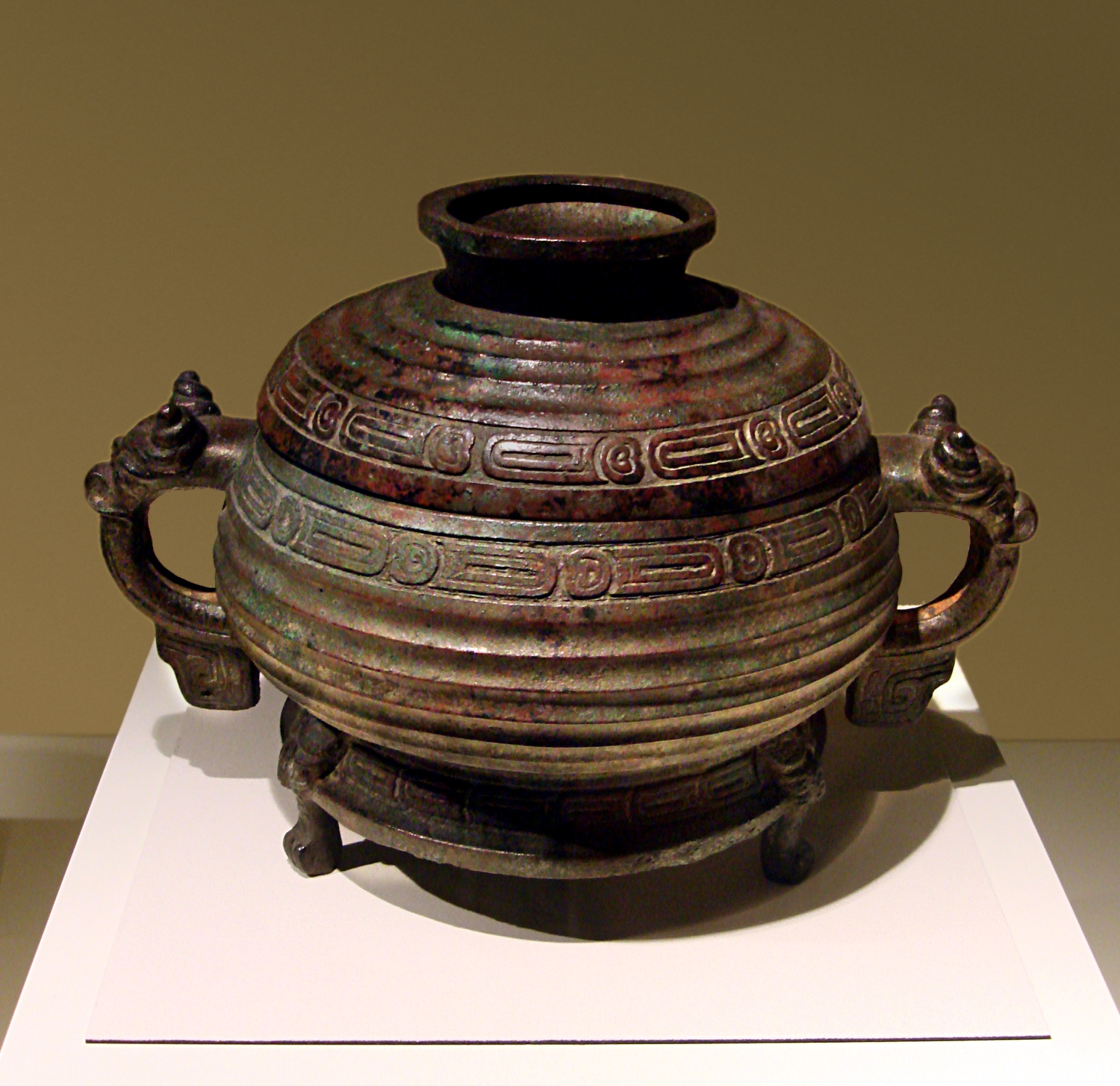
A Western Zhou ceremonial bronze of cooking-vessel form inscribed to record that the King of Zhou gave a fiefdom to Shi You, ordering that he inherit the title as well as the land and people living there

Western writers often describe the Zhou period as feudal because the Zhou's fengjian system invites comparison with European political systems during the Middle Ages.

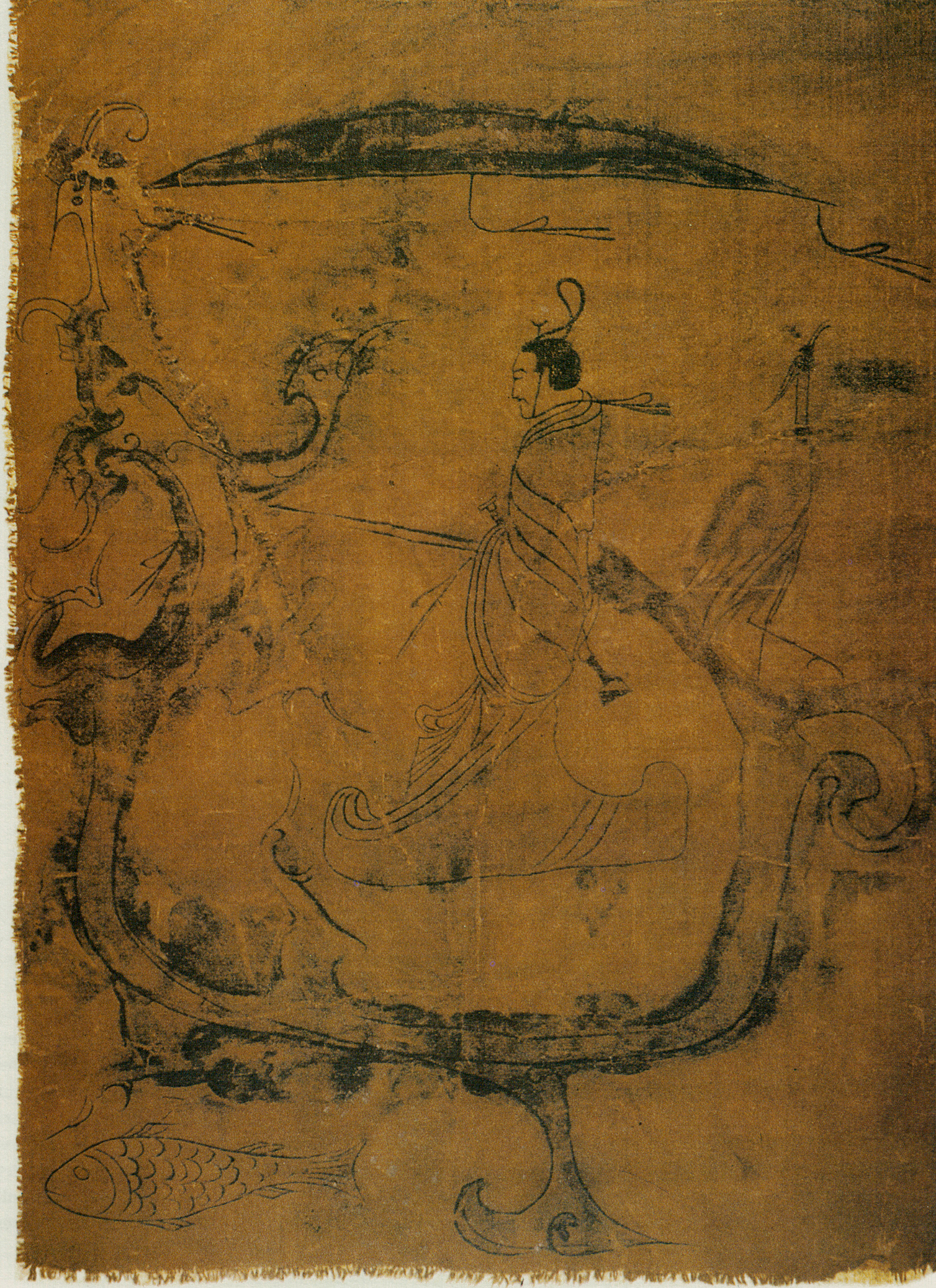
Silk painting depicting a man riding a dragon, painting on silk, dated to 5th–3rd century BC, from Zidanku Tomb no. 1 in Changsha, Hunan

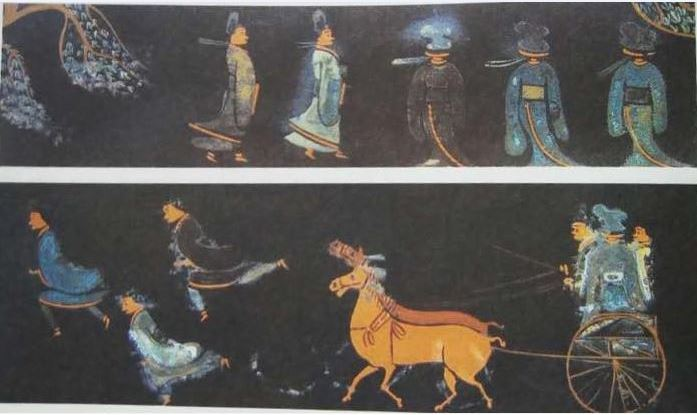
A c. 316 BC lacquerware painting from the Jingmen Tomb of the state of Chu (704–223 BC), depicting men wearing precursors to hanfu dress and riding in a two-horsed chariot

There were many similarities between the decentralized systems. When the dynasty was established, the conquered land was divided into hereditary fiefs (諸侯, zhūhóu) that eventually became powerful in their own right. In matters of inheritance, the Zhou dynasty recognized only patrilineal primogeniture as legal. According to Hsi-Sheng Tao, "the Tsung-fa or descent line system has the following characteristics: patrilineal descent, patrilineal succession, patriarchate, sib-exogamy, and primogeniture"

The system, also called "extensive stratified patrilineage", was defined by the anthropologist Kwang-chih Chang as "characterized by the fact that the eldest son of each generation formed the main of line descent and political authority, whereas the younger brothers were moved out to establish new lineages of lesser authority. The farther removed, the lesser the political authority". Ebrey defines the descent-line system as follows: "A great line (ta-tsung) is the line of eldest sons continuing indefinitely from a founding ancestor. A lesser line is the line of younger sons going back no more than five generations. Great lines and lesser lines continually spin off new lesser lines, founded by younger sons".

K.E. Brashier writes in his book "Ancestral Memory in Early China" about the tsung-fa system of patrilineal primogeniture: "The greater lineage, if it has survived, is the direct succession from father to eldest son and is not defined via the collateral shifts of the lesser lineages. In discussions that demarcate between trunk and collateral lines, the former is called a zong and the latter a zu, whereas the whole lineage is dubbed the shi. [...] On one hand, every son who is not the eldest and hence not heir to the lineage territory has the potential of becoming a progenitor and fostering a new trunk lineage (Ideally he would strike out to cultivate new lineage territory). [...] According to the Zou commentary, the son of heaven divided land among his feudal lords, his feudal lords divided the land among their dependent families and so forth down the pecking order to the officers who had their dependent kin and the commoners who "each had his apportioned relations and all had their graded precedence""

This type of unilineal descent-group later became the model of the Korean family through the influence of Neo-Confucianism, as Zhu Xi and others advocated its re-establishment in China.

==== Fengjian system and bureaucracy ====
There were five peerage ranks below the royal ranks, in descending order with common English translations: gōng 公 "duke", hóu 侯 "marquis", bó 伯 "count", zǐ 子 "viscount", and nán 男 "baron". At times, a vigorous duke would take power from his nobles and centralize the state. Centralization became more necessary as the states began to war among themselves and decentralization encouraged more war. If a duke took power from his nobles, the state would have to be administered bureaucratically by appointed officials.

Despite these similarities, there are a number of important differences from medieval Europe. One obvious difference is that the Zhou ruled from walled cities rather than castles. Another was China's distinct class system, which lacked an organized clergy but saw Shang-descent yeomen become masters of ritual and ceremony, as well as astronomy, state affairs and ancient canons, known as ru (儒). When a dukedom was centralized, these people would find employment as government officials or officers. These hereditary classes were similar to Western knights in status and breeding, but unlike the European equivalent, they were expected to be something of a scholar instead of a warrior. Being appointed, they could move from one state to another. Some would travel from state to state peddling schemes of administrative or military reform. Those who could not find employment would often end up teaching young men who aspired to official status. The most famous of these was Confucius, who taught a system of mutual duty between superiors and inferiors. In contrast, the Legalists had no time for Confucian virtue and advocated a system of strict laws and harsh punishments.

=== Agriculture, Industry ===
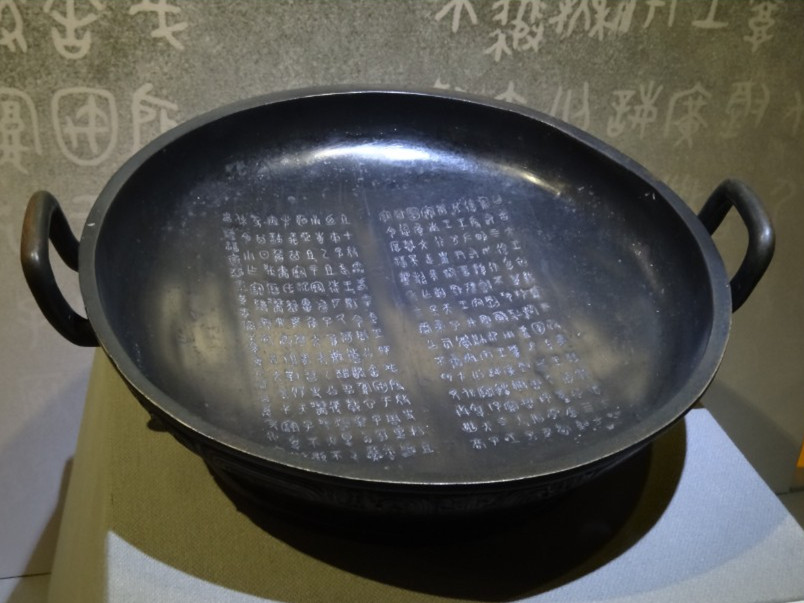
The Shi Qiang pan (c. 10th century BC), inscribed with the accomplishments of the earliest Zhou kings

Across the Zhou period, agricultural land was generally tied to aristocratic lineages rather than held as private noble property; for the Western Zhou in particular, this authority was rooted in lineage‑based political geography rather than in the later conceptualized fengjian system. Farming was carried out mainly by ordinary rural households, who formed the core of agricultural production. These households owed labor service, taxes, and military obligations to their lords or to the state, depending on the period. Various dependent laborers and slaves also existed, but they constituted a minority of the rural population. Modern scholarship emphasizes that Zhou rural society did not resemble European manorial serfdom, since most farmers were not legally bound to noble estates and retained household autonomy. Classical texts describe an idealized well field system (井田制) in which a plot of land was divided into nine squares, with the central square farmed for public obligations—such as producing grain for communal storage in times of poor harvest—while the surrounding squares were farmed by individual households. Modern historians generally view this as a later conceptual model rather than a documented administrative system of the Zhou period.

Some important manufacturing sectors during this period included bronze smelting, which was integral to making weapons and farming tools. These industries were dominated by the nobility who directed the production of such materials.

China's first projects of hydraulic engineering were initiated during the Zhou dynasty, ultimately as a means to aid agricultural irrigation. Sunshu Ao, the Chancellor of Wei who served King Zhuang of Chu, dammed a river to create an enormous irrigation reservoir in modern-day northern Anhui province. For this, Sunshu is credited as China's first hydraulic engineer. The later Wei statesman Ximen Bao, who served Marquis Wen of Wei (445–396 BC), was the first hydraulic engineer of China to have created a large irrigation canal system. As the main focus of his grandiose project, his canal work eventually diverted the waters of the entire Zhang River to a spot further up the Yellow River.

=== Military ===
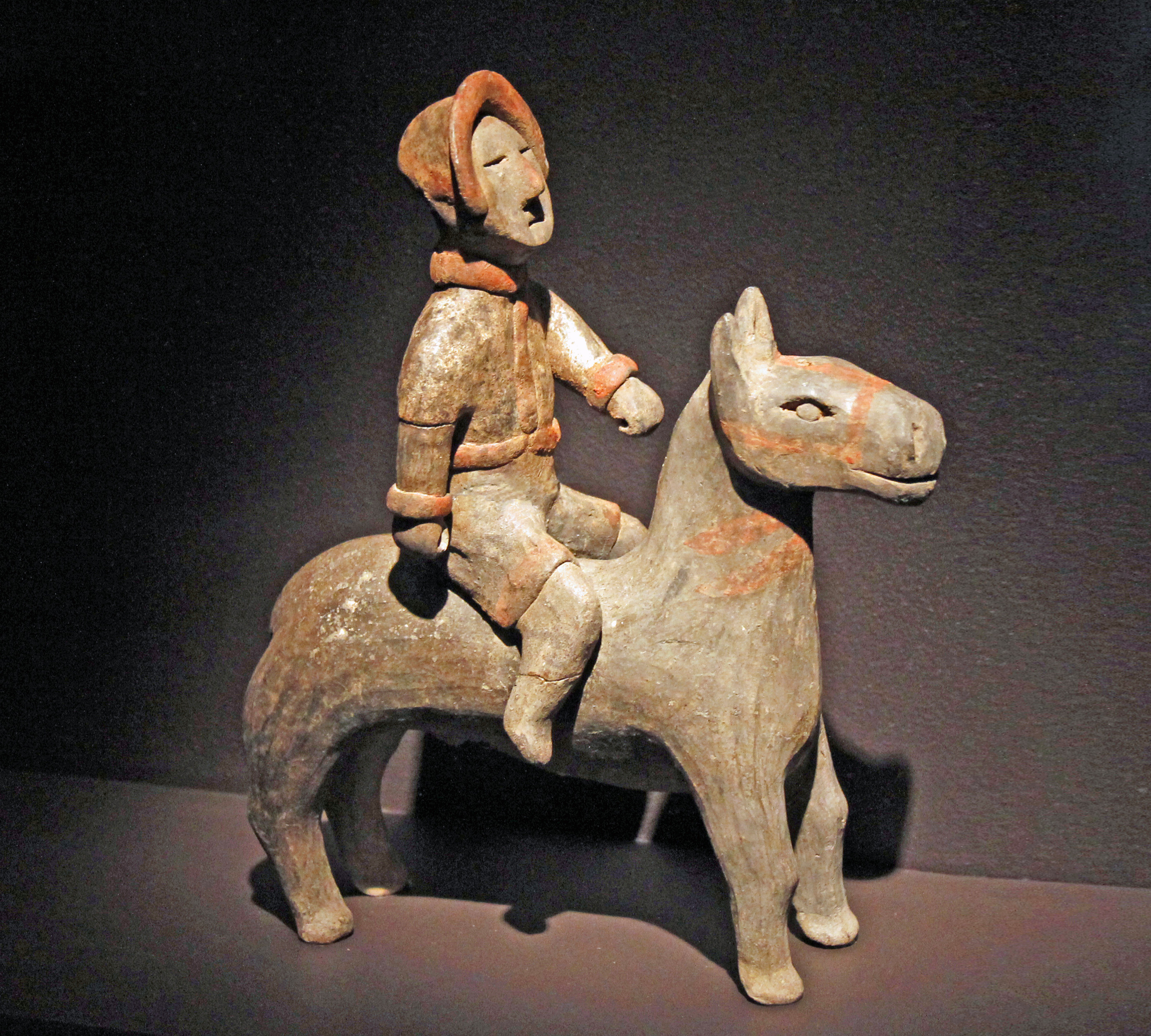
The Taerpo Horserider, a Qin terracotta figurine from a tomb near modern Xianyang in Shaanxi, 4th–3rd century BC

The early Western Zhou supported a strong army, split into two major units: "the Six Armies of the west" and "the Eight Armies of Chengzhou". The armies campaigned in the northern Loess Plateau, modern Ningxia and the Yellow River floodplain. The military prowess of Zhou peaked during the 19th year of King Zhao's reign, when the six armies were wiped out along with King Zhao on a campaign around the Han River. Early Zhou kings were true commanders-in-chief.

King Zhao was famous for repeated campaigns in the Yangtze region, and died on campaign. Later kings' campaigns were less effective. King Li led 14 armies against barbarians in the south, but failed to achieve any victory. King Xuan fought the Quanrong nomads in vain. King You was killed by the Quanrong when Haojing was sacked. Although chariots had been introduced to China during the Shang dynasty from Central Asia, the Zhou period saw the first major use of chariots in battle. Recent archaeological finds demonstrate similarities between horse burials of the Shang and Zhou dynasties with the steppe populations in the west, such as the Saka and Wusun. Other possible cultural influences resulting from contact with these Iranic people of Central Asia in this period may include fighting styles, head-and-hooves burials, art motifs and myths.

The Zhou army also included "barbarian" troops such as the Di people. King Hui of Zhou married a princess of the Red Di as a sign of appreciation for the importance of the Di troops. King Xiang of Zhou also married a Di princess after receiving Di military support.

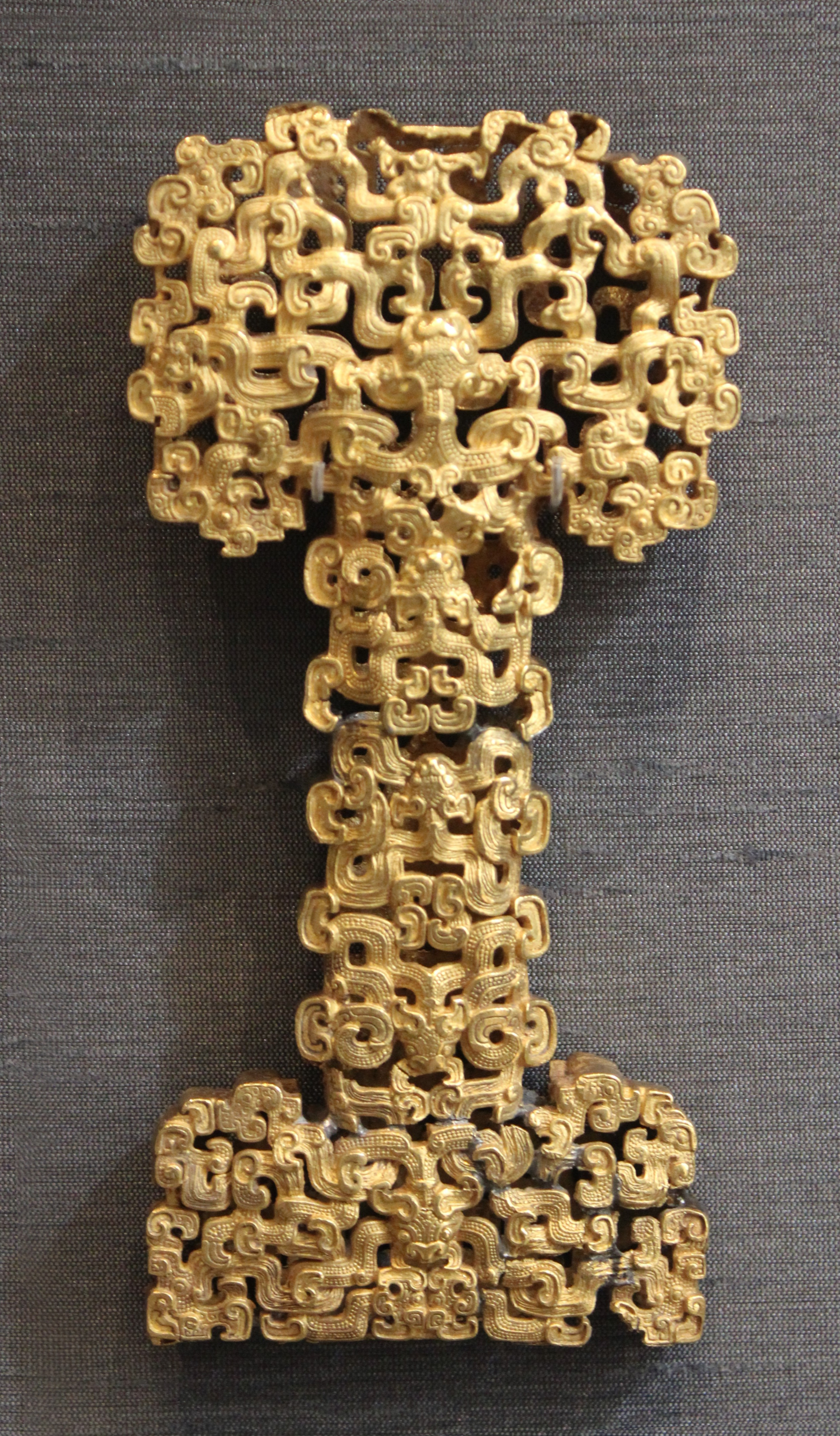
Gold sword hilt, Eastern Zhou, 6–5th century BC – British Museum

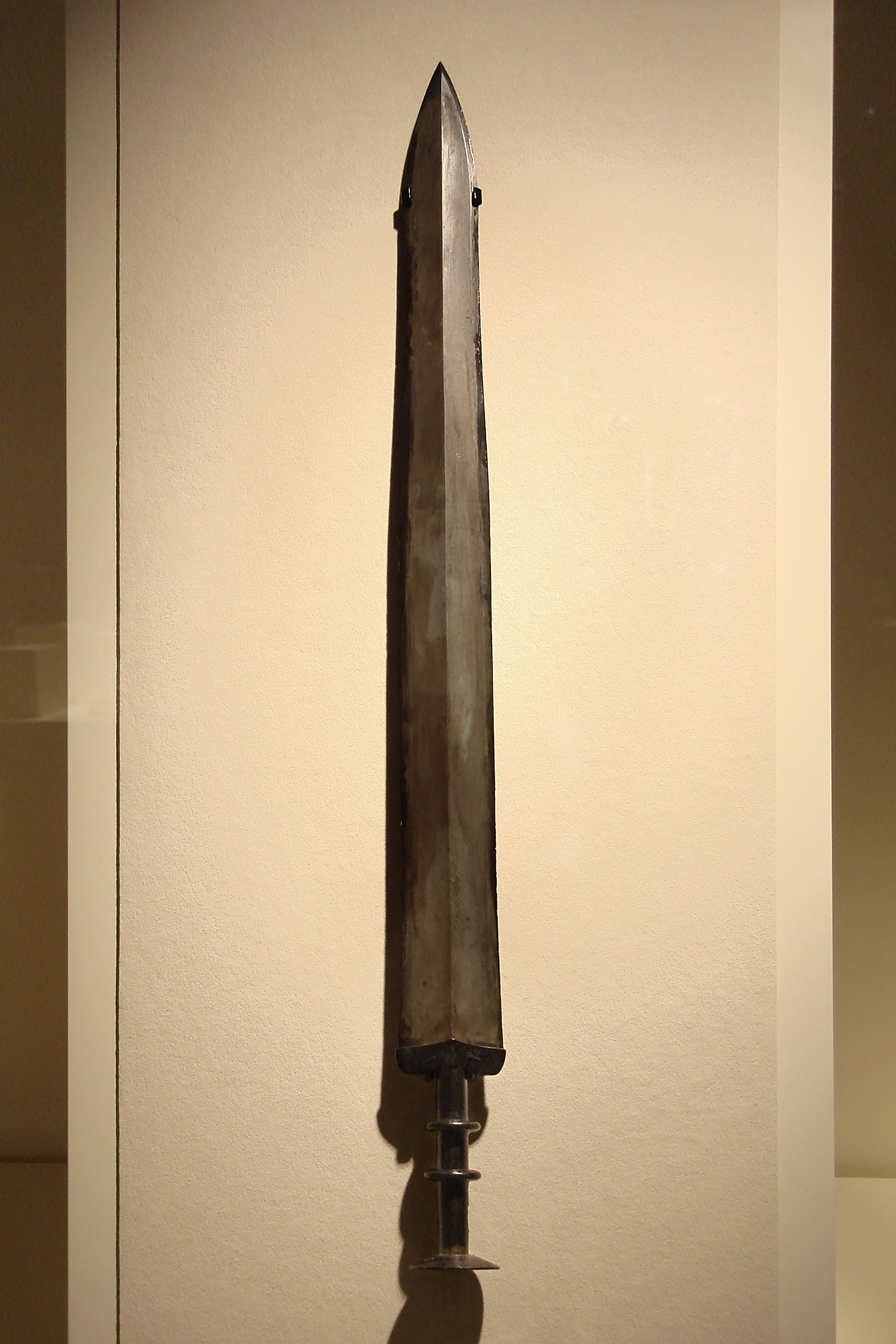
Eastern Zhou bronze sword excavated from Changsa, Hunan

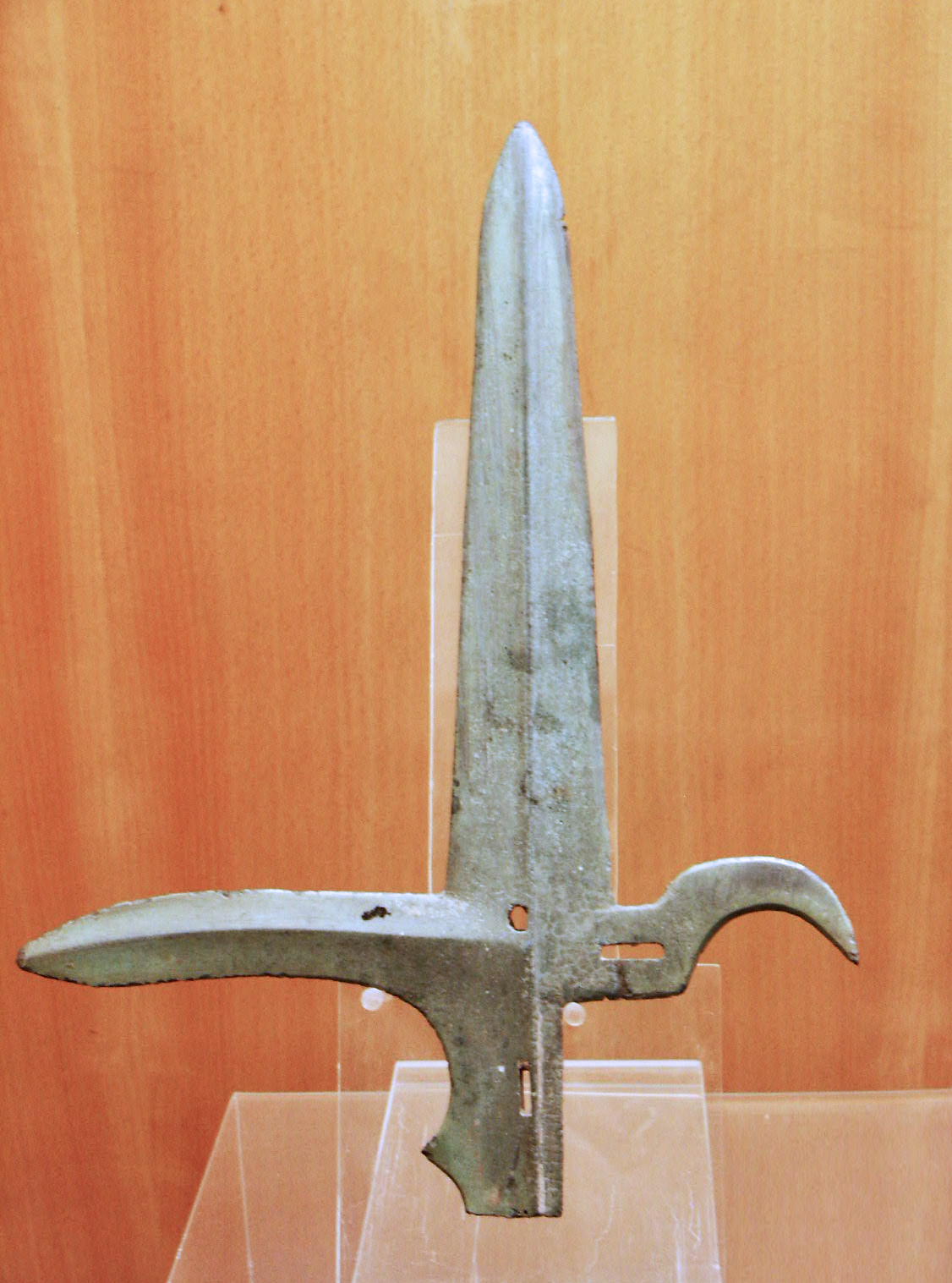
Eastern Zhou jǐ bronze halberd

=== Philosophy ===
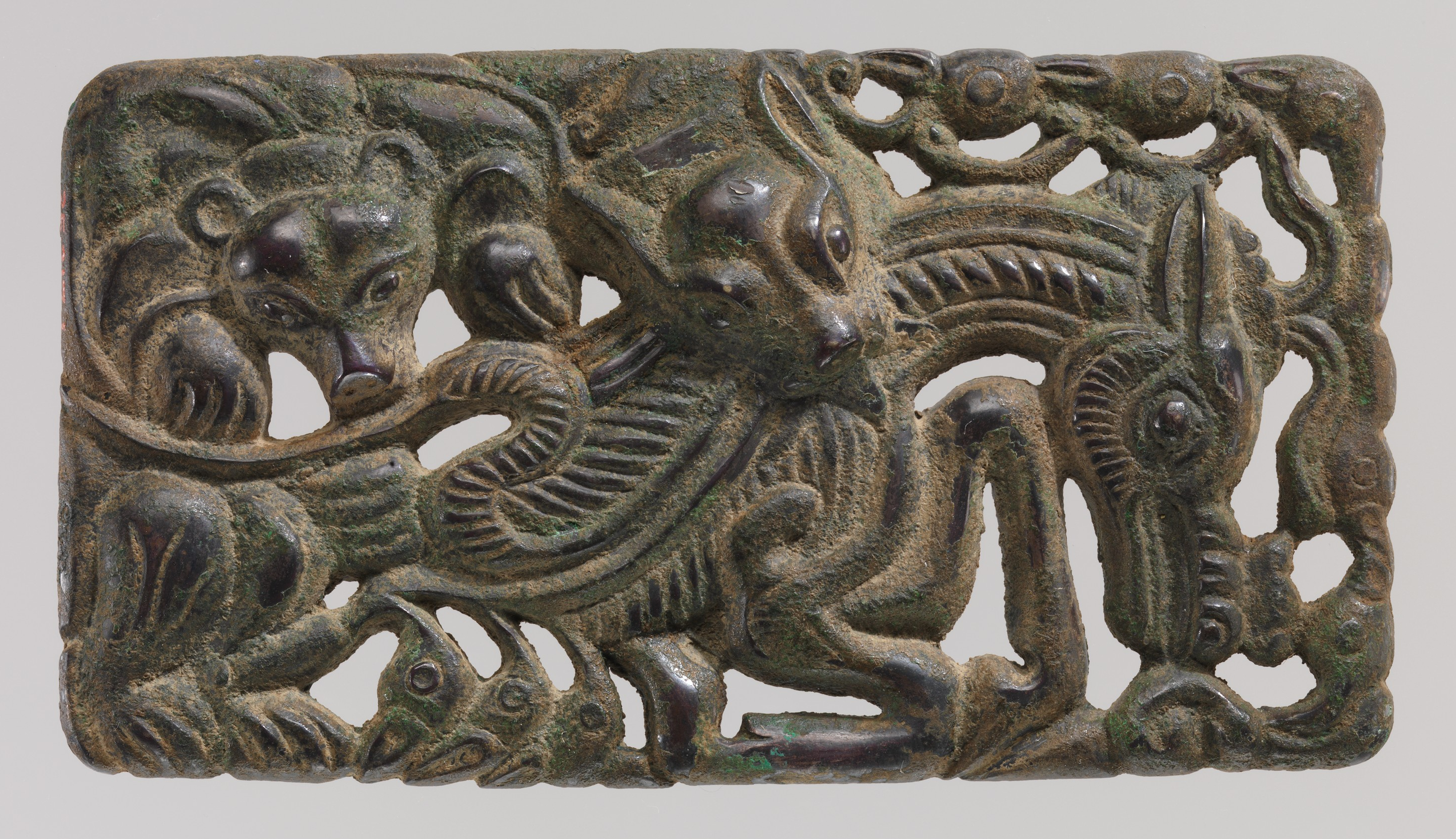
Plaque in nomadic animal style, Eastern Zhou or Han dynasty, 4th–3rd century BC.

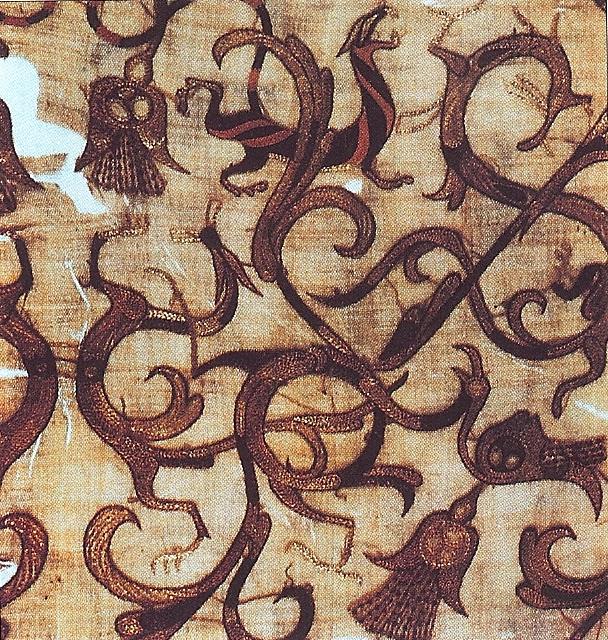
An embroidered silk gauze ritual garment from an Eastern Zhou era tomb at Mashan, Hubei, 4th century BC

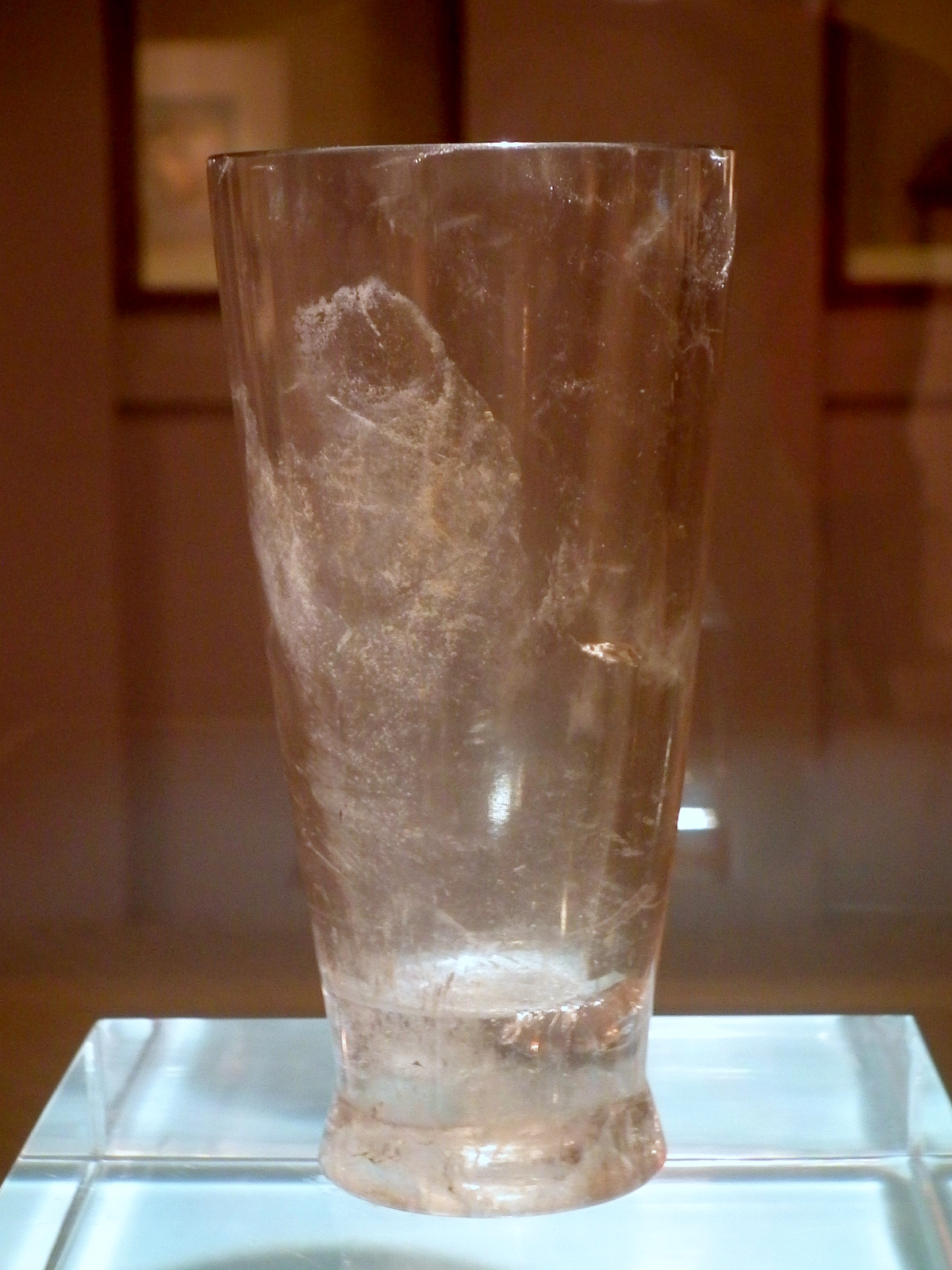
A drinking cup carved from crystal, unearthed at Banshan, Hangzhou, Warring States period – Hangzhou Museum

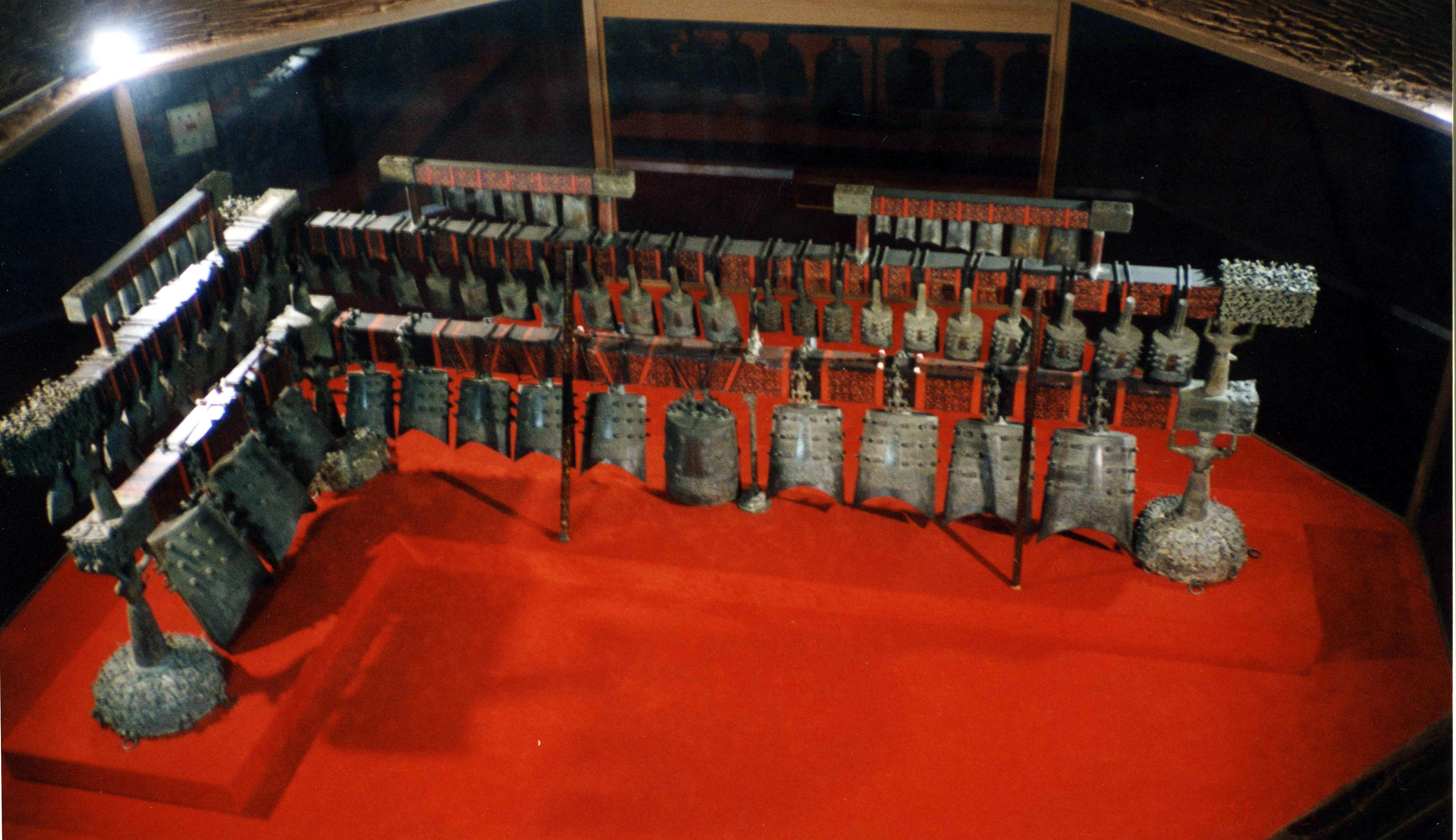
The Bianzhong of Marquis Yi of Zeng, a set of bronze bianzhong percussion instruments from his tomb in Hubei, dated 433 BC

During the Zhou dynasty, the origins of native Chinese philosophy developed, its initial stages of development beginning in the 6th century BC. The greatest Chinese philosophers, those who made the greatest impact on later generations of Chinese, were Confucius, founder of Confucianism, and Laozi, founder of Taoism. Other philosophers of this era were Mozi, founder of Mohism; Mencius, the "second sage" of Confucianism; Shang Yang and Han Fei, responsible for the development of ancient Chinese Legalism; and Xunzi, who was arguably the center of ancient Chinese intellectual life during his time.

The state theology of the Zhou dynasty used concepts from the Shang dynasty and mostly referred to the Shang god, Di, as Tian, a more distant and unknowable concept, yet one that anyone could utilize, the opposite view of the Shang's spirituality. The Zhou wanted to increase the number of enlightenment seekers, mystics, and those who would be interested in learning about such things as a way to further distance their people from the Shang-era paradigm and local traditions.

==== Li ====
Having emerged during the Western Zhou, the li ritual system encoded an understanding of manners as an expression of the social hierarchy, ethics, and regulation concerning material life; the corresponding social practices became idealized within Confucian ideology.

The system was canonized in the Book of Rites, Rites of Zhou, and Etiquette and Ceremonial compiled during the Han dynasty (202 BC – 220 AD), thus becoming the heart of the Chinese imperial ideology. While the system was initially a respected body of concrete regulations, the fragmentation of the Western Zhou period led the ritual to drift towards moralization and formalization in regard to:

- The five orders of Chinese nobility
- Ancestral temples (size, legitimate number of pavilions)
- Ceremonial regulations (number of ritual vessels, musical instruments, people in the dancing troupe)

=== Sexuality ===
Aside from Shi Jing, the earliest Chinese poem anthology, where gender-ambiguity and same-sex affection both made an appearance, the Zhou dynasty involved many recorded forms of homosexuality, including farmers and soldiers. Bisexuality and/or homosexual practices often involved heterosexual marriage, foundational to kinship and social networks in the Zhou Dynasty and beyond in Imperial China, whereas male homosexuality was often "class-based," meaning these relationships involved economic and social benefits.

== Kings ==
The rulers of the Zhou dynasty were titled wang (王), which was also the term used by the Shang rulers, normally translated into English as 'king'. In addition to these rulers, King Wu's immediate ancestors—Danfu, Jili, and Wen—are also referred to as "Kings of Zhou", despite having been nominal vassals of the Shang kings.

List of Western Zhou kings
Name		Reign (Note: Dates are those published by Xia–Shang–Zhou Chronology Project and Edward L. Shaughnessy's The Absolute Chronology of the Western Zhou Dynasty.)
Personal	Posthumous	Reign
Fa 發	King Wu 周武王	1046–1043 BC; 1045–1043 BC
Song 誦	King Cheng 周成王	1042–1021 BC; 1042/1035–1006 BC
Zhao 釗	King Kang 周康王	1020–996 BC; 1005/1003–978 BC
Xia 瑕	King Zhao 周昭王	995–977 BC; 977/975–957 BC
Man 滿	King Mu 周穆王	976–922 BC; 956–918 BC
Yihu 繄扈	King Gong 周共王 (Note: Or 周龔王)	922–900 BC; 917/915–900 BC
Jian 囏	King Yih 周懿王	899–892 BC; 899/897–873 BC
Pifang 辟方	King Xiao 周孝王	891–886 BC; 872?–866 BC
Xie 燮	King Yi 周夷王	885–878 BC; 865–858 BC
Hu 胡	King Li 周厲王 (Note: Or 周剌王)	877–841 BC; 857/853–842/828 BC
Gonghe Regency 共和		841–828 BC
Jing 靜	King Xuan 周宣王	827–782 BC
Gongsheng 宮湦	King You 周幽王	781–771 BC

List of Eastern Zhou kings
Name		Reign
Personal	Posthumous	Reign
Yijiu 宜臼	King Ping 周平王	770–720 BC
Lin 林	King Huan 周桓王	719–697 BC
Tuo 佗	King Zhuang 周莊王	696–682 BC
Huqi 胡齊	King Xi 周僖王	681–677 BC
Lang 閬	King Hui 周惠王	676–652 BC
Zheng 鄭	King Xiang 周襄王	651–619 BC
Renchen 壬臣	King Qing 周頃王	618–613 BC
Ban 班	King Kuang 周匡王	612–607 BC
Yu 瑜	King Ding 周定王	606–586 BC
Yi 夷	King Jian 周簡王	585–572 BC
Xiexin 洩心	King Ling 周靈王	571–545 BC
Gui 貴	King Jing 周景王	544–521 BC
Meng 猛	King Dao 周悼王	520 BC
Gai 丐	King Jing 周敬王	519–476 BC
Ren 仁	King Yuan 周元王	475–469 BC
Jie 介	King Zhending 周貞定王	468–442 BC
Quji 去疾	King Ai 周哀王	441 BC
Shu 叔	King Si 周思王	441 BC
Wei 嵬	King Kao 周考王	440–426 BC
Wu 午	King Weilie 周威烈王	425–402 BC
Jiao 驕	King An 周安王	401–376 BC
Xi 喜	King Lie 周烈王	375–369 BC
Bian 扁	King Xian 周顯王	368–321 BC
Ding 定	King Shenjing 周慎靚王	320–315 BC
Yan 延	King Nan 周赧王	314–256 BC

Nobles of the Ji family proclaimed Duke Hui of Eastern Zhou as King Nan's successor after their capital, Chengzhou, fell to Qin forces in 256 BC. Ji Zhao, a son of King Nan, led a resistance against Qin for five years. The dukedom fell in 249 BC. The remaining Ji family ruled Yan and Wei until 209 BC.

During Confucius's lifetime in the Spring and Autumn period, Zhou kings had little power, and much administrative responsibility and de-facto political strength was wielded by rulers of smaller domains and local community leaders.

== Astrology ==
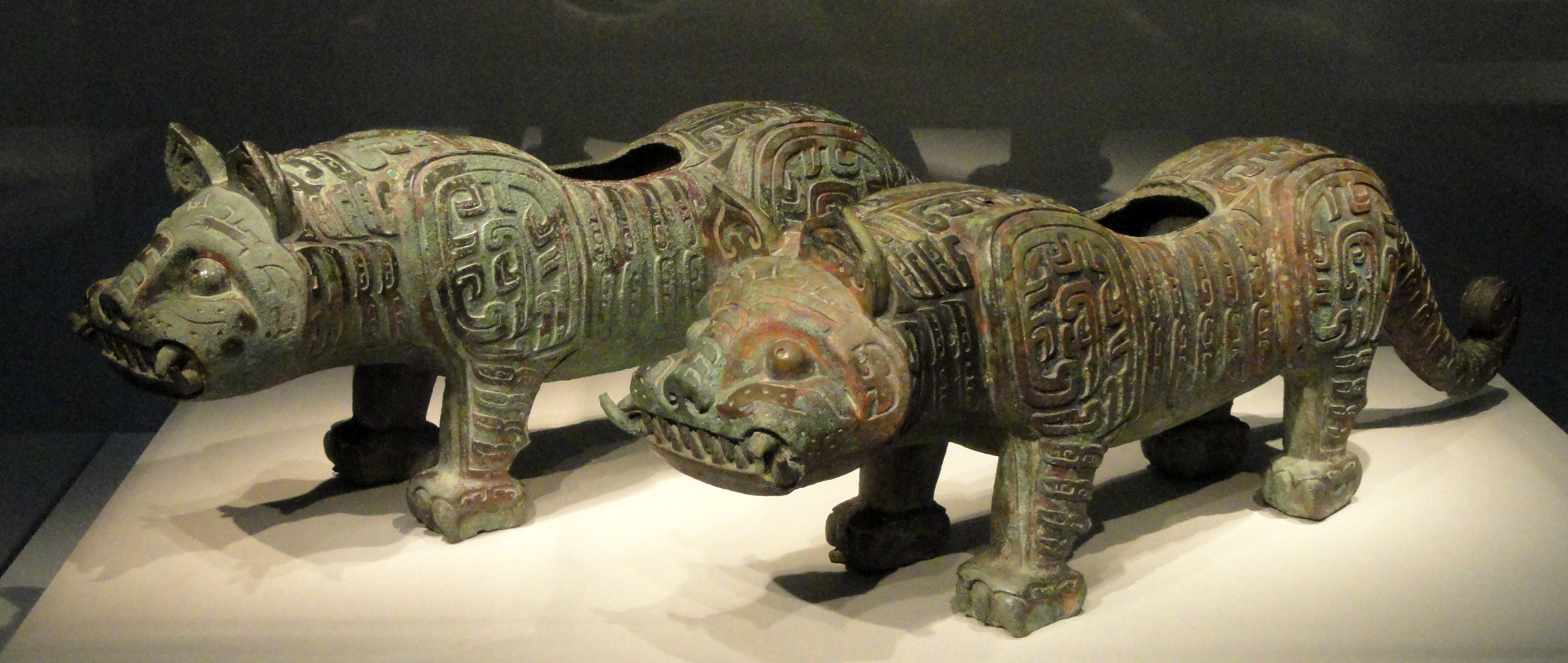
Bronze fittings in the form of tigers, Baoji, Shaanxi – Western Zhou c. 900 BC

In traditional Chinese astrology, Zhou is represented by two stars, Eta Capricorni (週一; Zhōu yī; 'first star of Zhou') and 21 Capricorni (週二; Zhōu'èr; 'second star of Zhou'), in "Twelve States" asterism. Zhou is also represented by the star Beta Serpentis in asterism "Right Wall", Heavenly Market enclosure.

== See also ==
- List of Zhou dynasty states
- Four occupations
- Historical capitals of China
- Women in ancient and imperial China
- Ritual and music system
- Patriarchal clan system

== Notes ==
Preceded by Shang dynasty	Dynasties in Chinese history 1046–256 BC	Succeeded by Qin dynasty
