= List of Chinese monarchs =

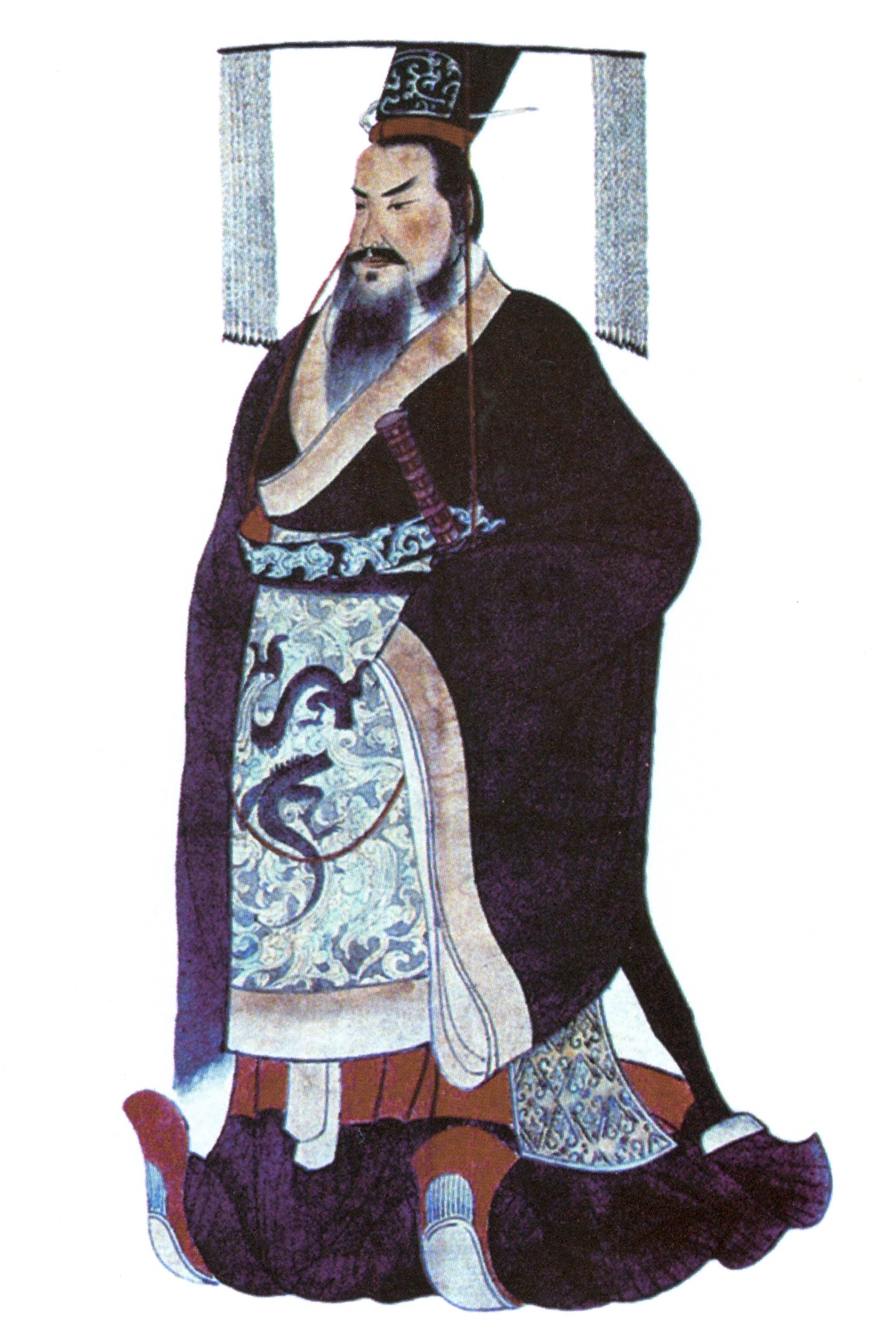
Imagined depiction of Qin Shi Huang, the first Emperor of a unified China, (made during the Qing dynasty)

The Chinese monarchs were the rulers of China during Ancient and Imperial periods. (Note: Contemporary scholars often split Chinese history into three periods: Ancient, Imperial and Modern, based on the Ancient, Medieval and Modern scheme developed by Liang Qichao. In Chinese history, "Medieval"—originally defined as from the Qin to Qing dynasties—has since been replaced by "Imperial". "Medieval" now refers to the more specific period from the End of the Han dynasty through the Five Dynasties and Ten Kingdoms.) The earliest rulers in traditional Chinese historiography are of mythological origin, and followed by the Xia dynasty of highly uncertain and contested historicity. During the subsequent Shang (c. 1600–1046 BCE) and Zhou (1046–256 BCE) dynasties, rulers were referred to as Wang 王, meaning king. China was fully united for the first time by Qin Shi Huang (r. 259–210 BCE), who established the first Imperial dynasty, adopting the title Huangdi (皇帝), meaning Emperor, which remained in use until the Imperial system's fall in 1912.

At no point during Ancient or Imperial China was there a formalized means to confer legitimate succession between rulers. From the Zhou dynasty onwards, monarchs justified their reigns by claiming the Mandate of Heaven (天命; Tiānmìng). (Note: The Mandate of Heaven is essentially equivalent to the European divine right of kings. It was first formally introduced by the Duke of Zhou to justify his house's overthrow of the Shang. Prior to this, the Shang kings justified their rule by being claiming descent from a "divine ancestor", and being able to interpret, manipulate and maintain cosmic relations between humans and heaven (天; Tiān).) The mandate held that a ruler and their successors had permission from the heavens to rule as long as they did so effectively. It also declared a ruler the Son of Heaven (天子; Tiānzǐ), giving them the right to rule "all under heaven" (天下; Tiānxià). Given the Mandate's subjective nature, rulers also utilized a variety of methods to retain support and justify their accession. This ranged from military enforcement, political patronage, establishing peace and solidity, institutional reform, and historical revisionism to legitimize the dissolution of previous dynasties and their own succession. For most of Imperial China, the wuxing (五行; "Five Elements") philosophical scheme was also central to justify dynastic succession.

Most Chinese monarchs had many names. They were given a personal name (名字; Míngzi) at birth, but later referred to by a posthumous name (謚號; Shìhào)—which memorialized their accomplishments or character—due to a cultural naming taboo. Most emperors of the Imperial period also received a temple name (廟號; Miàohào), used to venerate them in ancestor worship. From the rule of Emperor Wu of Han (r. 141–87 BCE) onwards, (Note: Although era names originated in the reign of Emperor Wu of Han (r. 141–87 BCE), his two immediate predecessors Emperor Wen of Han (r. 180–157) and Emperor Jing of Han (r. 157–141) were also given era names later.) emperors also adopted one or several era names (年號; Niánhào), or "reign mottos", to divide their rule by important events or accomplishments. Ming (1368–1644) and Qing (1644–1912) rulers are referred to solely by their era names, of which they only had one.

Apart from ethnic Han rulers, China was also ruled by various non-Han monarchs, including Jurchen, Khitan, Manchu, Mongol and Tangut and many others. To justify their reign, non-Han rulers sometimes aligned themselves with the Confucian sages or the Chakravarti of Chinese Buddhism. There are numerous lengthy periods where many competing kingdoms claimed the throne, many of whose legitimacy are still debated by scholars.

== Ancient China ==
=== Mythological rulers ===
In traditional Chinese historiography, various models of mythological founding rulers exist. The relevancy of these figures to the earliest Chinese people is unknown, since most accounts of them were written from the Warring States period (c. 475–221 BCE) onwards. The sinologist Kwang-chih Chang has generalized the typical stages: "the first period was populated by gods, the second by demigods/culture hero, and the third by the legendary kings." The primordial god Pangu is given by many texts as the earliest figure and is credited with forming the world by separating heaven and earth. Other gods include Nüwa, who repaired heaven; Hou Yi, a mythical archer; and Gonggong, a serpent-like water deity.

Demigod and hero rulers from hero myths—the largest group Chinese myths—are attributed the invention of specific items, practices or traditions. Among the more important of them are Fuxi, the inventor of hunting; Suiren, who invented fire; and Shennong, who invented both agriculture and medicine. The subsequent legendary kings began with the Yellow Emperor (黃帝), known as Huangdi, a major culture hero of Chinese civilization whose reign was considered exemplary. Succeeding rulers include some combination of Shaohao, Zhuanxu, Emperor Ku, Emperor Yao and Emperor Shun. Since the late Warring States onwards, early Chinese monarchs have traditionally been ground into the concept of the Three Sovereigns and Five Emperors; however, the chosen figures of this grouping varies considerably between sources. Generally, most accounts include at least Fuxi and Shennong among the Three Sovereigns as well as the Yellow Emperor, Yao and Shun among the Five Emperors.

=== Xia dynasty ===
The Three Sovereigns and Five Emperors period was followed by the Xia dynasty in traditional historiography. Founded by Yu the Great, both the dynasty and its rulers are of highly uncertain and controversial historicity.

(#) – Uncertain legitimacy

Xia dynasty (夏朝)
Name	Speculative reign length (Note: All reign dates for the Xia rulers are excluded. They are highly speculative, due to their dependence on the already uncertain beginning and ending dates of the dynasty)		Traditional succession	Capital	Purported life details
Name	ZTW	Trad	Traditional succession	Capital	Purported life details
Yu 禹	45	7	Chosen by the mythical Emperor Shun	Ji	Awarded the throne after his institution of flood control. He is often known as "Yu the Great" and his passing of the throne to his son marked the beginning of China's hereditary succession
Qi 啟	10	8	Son of Yu	Xiayi	Prevented a rebellion led by his son Wuguan
(Tai) Kang （太）康	29	28	Son of Qi	Zhenxun	Traditionally considered an ineffective king, either due to tyranny or incompetence. May have been briefly dethroned by the mythical hero Han Zhuo and later murdered by Han's son Ao
(Zhong) Kang (#) （仲）康	13	13	Son of Qi	Zhenxun	May not have ruled as his existence is sometimes absent from Xia king lists
Xiang 相	28	28	Son of (Zhong) Kang	Shang, then Zhenxun	Killed by a son of Han Zhuo
Interregnum, ruled by Han Zhuo
(Shao) Kang （少）康	21	21	Son of Xiang	Yuan	Restored the dynasty after killing Han Zhuo and his sons
Zhu 杼	17	16	Son of (Shao) Kang	Yuan, then Laoqiu	Little is known of his reign
Huai 槐	26	25	Son of Zhu	–	Little is known of his reign; may have ruled up to 40 years
Mang 芒	18	17	Son of Huai	–	Little is known of his reign
Xie 泄	16	15	Son of Mang	–	Little is known of his reign
(Bu) Jiang （不）降	59	58	Son of Xie	–	Little is known of his reign; campaigned against the northwestern Jiuyuan peoples
Jiong 扃	21	20	Son of Xie	–	Little is known of his reign
Jin 廑	21	20	Son of Jiong	Xihe	Little is known of his reign
Kong Jia 孔甲	31	30	Son of (Bu) Jiang	Xihe	His reign inaugurated the Xia's gradual decline
Gao 皋	11	10	Son of Kong Jia	–	Little is known of his reign
Fa 發	11	20?	Son of Gao	–	May have only reigned 7 years. His reign saw the earliest recorded earthquake, identified with the Mount Tai earthquake.
Jie 桀	52	52	Son of Fa	Zhenxun, then Henan	Traditionally considered a cruel and oppressive ruler. Fled the empire after losing the Battle of Mingtiao to the state of Shang

=== Shang dynasty (c. 1600–1046 BCE) ===
Unlike the Xia, the Shang dynasty's historicity is firmly established, due to written records on divination objects known as Oracle bones. The oldest such oracle bones date to the Late Shang (c. 1250—1046 BCE), during the reign of Wu Ding (1250–1192), putting the exact details of earlier rulers into doubt.

(#) – Uncertain legitimacy

Shang dynasty (商朝; c. 1600–1046/c. 1570—1045 BCE)
Posthumous name	Personal name	Tentative reign (BCE) (Note: The traditional dating method (beginning the Shang in 1766) is not included in this table. See Liu et al. 2021, pp. 165, 169 for another, more recent, method of dating)		Traditional succession	Residence	Purported life details
Posthumous name	Personal name	XSZ Project	CHAC	Traditional succession	Residence	Purported life details
==== Early Shang ====
Tang 汤 Da Yi 大乙	Zi Lü 子履	fl. c. 1600	fl. c. 1570	Defeated the purportedly tyrannous Jie of Xia at the Battle of Mingtiao and established the Shang dynasty	Bo, then Shangyi	Traditionally considered a noble and virtuous ruler
Da Ding (#) 大丁 Tai Ding (#) 太丁	unknown	–	–	Son of Tang	–	Uncertain whether he was ever enthroned; may have died before succeeding his father
Wai Bing 外丙	Zi Sheng 子勝	—	—	Son of Tang	Bo	—
Zhong Ren (#) 中壬	Zi Yong 子庸	—	—	Son of Tang	Bo	Not listed in the oracle bones inscriptions
Tai Jia 太甲	Zi Zhi 子至	—	—	Son of Da Ding	Bo	Traditionally considered an autocratic and cruel ruler
Wo Ding (#) 沃丁 Qiang Ding 羌丁	Zi Xuan 子絢	—	—	Son of Tai Jia	Bo	His name is not found in oracle bone inscriptions, making his certainty as a ruler less secure.
Tai Geng 太庚 Da Geng 大庚	Zi Bian 子辯	—	—	Son of Tai Jia	Bo	–
Xiao Jia 小甲	Zi Gao 子高	—	—	Son of Tai Geng	Bo	–
Yong Ji 雍己	Zi Zhou 子伷	—	—	Son of Tai Geng	Bo	May have reigned after Tai Wu
Tai Wu 太戊 Da Wu 大戊	Zi Mi 子密	—	—	Son of Tai Geng	Bo	Said to have had a particularly long reign; one source records 75 years. The astronomer Wuxian was active under him
Zhong Ding 仲丁	Zi Zhung 子莊	—	—	Son of Tai Wu	Ao	May have succeeded Yong Ji
Wai Ren 外壬	Zi Fā 子發	—	—	Son of Tai Wu	Ao	–
He Dan Jia 河亶甲	Zi Zheng 子整	—	—	Son of Tai Wu	Xiang	Moved the capital to Xiang (相) and engaged in military campaigns
Zu Yi 祖己	Zi Teng 子滕	—	—	Son of Zhong Ding	Geng	The dynasty flourished particularly during his reign
Zu Xin 祖辛	Zi Dan 子旦	—	—	Son of Zu Yi	Bi	–
Wo Jia 沃甲 Qiang Jia 羌甲	Zi Yu 子踰	—	—	Son of Zu Yi	Bi	–
Zu Ding 祖丁	Zi Xin 子新	—	—	Son of Zu Xin	Bi	–
Nan Geng 南庚	Zi Geng 子更	—	—	Son of Wo Jia	Bi, then Yan	Moved the capital from Bi (庇) to Yan (奄)
Yang Jia 陽甲	Zi He 子和	—	—	Son of Zu Ding	Yan	His reign marked the decline of the Shang
Pan Geng 盤庚	Zi Xun 子旬	1300–1251 (48–49 years)	—	Son of Zu Ding	Yan, then Yin	Traditionally said to have moved the dynasty's capital from Yan (奄) to Yin (殷) Led a prosperous reign
Xiao Xin 小辛	Zi Song 子颂	1300–1251 (48–49 years)	—	Son of Zu Ding	Yin	His reign saw the continuation of the Shang's decline
Xiao Yi 小乙	Zi Lian 子敛	1300–1251 (48–49 years)	—	Son of Zu Ding	Yin	–
==== Late Shang ====
Wu Ding 武丁	Zi Zhao 子昭	1250–1192 (57–58 years)	?–1189	Son of Xiao Yi	Yin	A powerful king with a lengthy reign. Made his wife Fu Hao a general and purportedly defeated the mostly-unknown Guifang people. The first ruler whose name is included in oracle bones which date to his reign.
Zu Geng 祖庚	Zi Yue 子躍	1191–1148 (42–43 years)	1188–1178 (9–10 years)	Son of Wu Ding	Yin	Possibly commissioned the Houmuwu ding in memory of his mother Fu Jing (Note: Zu Ji, another son of Wu Ding is given a kingly title in some oracle bone texts, but did probably not reign.)
Zu Jia 祖甲	Zi Zai 子載	1191–1148 (42–43 years)	1177–1158 (18–19 years)	Son of Wu Ding	Yin	Reformed the ritual and calendar systems, as recording in the Book of Documents
Lin Xin (#) 廩辛	Zi Xian 子先	1191–1148 (42–43 years)	1157–1149 (7–8 years)	Son of Zu Jia	Yin	Due to inconsistencies in the oracle bone inscriptions, it is possible he did not reign.
Geng Ding 庚丁 Kang Ding 康丁	Zi Xiao 子囂	1191–1148 (42–43 years)	1148–1132 (15–16 years)	Son of Zu Jia	Yin	His reign accelerated the dynasty's decline
Wu Yi 武乙	Zi Qu 子瞿	1147–1131 (15–16 years)	1131–1117 (13–14 years)	Son of Geng Ding	Yin, Hebei, then Mo	Engaged in numerous military campaigns, including against the state of Yiqu. Traditionally held to have been killed by a lightning strike, considered a bad omen
Wen Wu Ding 文武丁 Wen Ding 文丁	Zi Tuo 子托	1112–1102 (9–10 years)	1116–1106 (9–10 years)	Son of Wu Yi	Yin	The Predynastic Zhou rose in power during his reign, led by King Ji of Zhou
Di Yi 帝乙	Zi Xian 子羡	1101–1076 (24–25 years)	1105–1087 (17–18 years)	Son of Wen Wu Ding	Yin	Supposedly married his daughter to King Wen of Zhou, or married his sister to King Ji of Zhou
Di Xin 帝辛 (紂)	Zi Shou 子受	1075–1046 (28–29 years)	1086–1045 (40–41 years)	Son of Di Yi	Yin	Killed by Ji Fa during the Battle of Muye

=== Zhou dynasty (1046–256 BCE) ===
Zhou dynasty (周; c. 1046–256 BCE)
Posthumous name	Personal name	Tentative reign (BCE)		Traditional succession	Purported life details
Posthumous name	Personal name	XSZ Project	CHAC	Traditional succession	Purported life details
==== Western Zhou ====
Wu 武	Ji Fa 姬發	1046–1043 (2–3 years)	1049–1043 (5–6 years)	Son of King Wen	Defeated Di Xin in the Battle of Muye
Cheng 成	Ji Song 姬誦	1042–1021 (20–21 years)	1042–1006 (35–36 years)	Son of Wu	Most of his reign was controlled by the Duke of Zhou, who suppressed the Rebellion of the Three Guards
Kang 康	Ji Zhao 姬釗	1020–996 (23–24 years)	1005–978 (26–27 years)	Son of Cheng	His accession established Zhou primogeniture. A largely peaceful reign
Zhao 昭	Ji Xia 姬瑕	995–977 (17–18 years)	977–957 (19–20 years)	Son of Kang	Lost the Zhou–Chu War, during which he died. His reign marked the Zhou's gradual decline
Mu 穆	Ji Man 姬滿	976–922 (53–54 years)	956–918 (39–40 years)	Son of Zhao	Engaged in many destabilizing territory conflicts
Gong 共	Ji Yihu 姬繄扈	922–900 (21–22 years)	917–900 (16–17 years)	Son of Mu	Little is known of his reign
Yih 懿	Ji Jian 姬囏	899–892 (6–7 years)	899–873 (25–26 years)	Son of Gong	Little is known of his reign; may have been removed from power by Xiao
Xiao 孝	Ji Pifang 姬辟方	891–886 (4–5 years)	872–866 (5–6 years)	Son of Mu	Little is known of his reign
Yí 夷	Ji Xie 姬燮	885–878 (6–7 years)	865–858 (6–7 years)	Son of Yih	Continued decline of the Zhou
Li 厲	Ji Hu 姬胡	877–841 (35–36 years)	857–842 (14–15 years)	Son of Yí	Traditionally considered a corrupt and cruel ruler. Exiled amid a peasant rebellion
Gonghe Regency (共和; 841–828)
Xuan 宣	Ji Jing 姬靜	827–782		Son of Li	Had military successes, aiming to restore Zhou authority
You 幽	Ji Gongnie 姬宮涅	781–771 (9–10 years)	782–771 (10–11 years)	Son of Xuan	Numerous natural disasters occurred, after which Quanrong him and overran the capital
==== Eastern Zhou ====
Spring and Autumn period (春秋時代; 770–476 BCE)
Ping 平	Ji Yijiu 姬宜臼	770–720 (49–50 years)		Son of You	Moved the capital to Luoyang
Huan 桓	Ji Lin 姬林	719–697 (21–22 years)		Grandson of Ping	Defeated by the Duke of Zheng at the Battle of Xuge, accelerating the Zhou dynasty's decline in power
Zhuang 莊	Ji Tuo 姬佗	696–682 (13–14 years)		Son of Huan	Royal court's authority began declining
Xi 釐	Ji Huqi 姬胡齊	681–677 (3–4 years)		Son of Zhuang	Briefly reigned as the Duke Huan led the Qi to surpass the Zhou in power
Hui 惠	Ji Lang 姬閬	676–652 (23–24 years)		Son of Xi	Slowed the Chu state's rise
Xiang 襄	Ji Zheng 姬鄭	651–619 (31–32 years)		Son of Hui	Briefly deposed by his brother, but reinstated by Duke Wen
Qing 頃	Ji Renchen 姬壬臣	618–613 (4–5 years)		Son of Xiang	Briefly reigned
Kuang 匡	Ji Ban 姬班	612–607 (4–5 years)		Son of Qing	Increasing fighting between surrounding kingdoms
Ding 定	Ji Yu 姬瑜	606–586 (19–20 years)		Son of Qing	Continued fighting of surrounding kingdoms
Jian 簡	Ji Yi 姬夷	585–572 (12–13 years)		Son of Ding	Continued fighting of surrounding kingdoms
Ling 靈	Ji Xiexin 姬泄心	571–545 (25–26 years)		Son of Jian	Weakened relations with surrounding kingdoms
Jing 景	Ji Gui 姬貴	544–521 (22–23 years)		Son of Ling	Died without an heir, causing a power struggle and rebellion
Dao 悼	Ji Meng 姬猛	520 (less than a year)		Son of Jing (544–521)	Briefly ruled before being murdered by his brother
Jing 敬	Ji Gai 姬丐	519–476 (42–43 years)		Son of Jing (544–521)	Briefly exiled during a revolt. Ruled during the lifetime of Confucius
Warring States period (戰國時代; 475–221 BCE)
Yuan 元	Ji Ren 姬仁	475–469 (5–6 years)		Son of Jing (519–476)	Decline in Zhou's power
Zhending 貞定	Ji Jie 姬介	468–442 (25–26 years)		Son of Yuan	Continued decline of Zhou
Ai 哀	Ji Quji 姬去疾	441 (less than a year)		Son of Zhending	Continued decline of Zhou. Killed by Si
Si 思	Ji Shu 姬叔	441 (less than a year)		Son of Zhending	Continued decline of Zhou. Killed by Kao
Kao 考	Ji Wei 姬嵬	440–426 (13–14 years)		Son of Zhending	–
Weilie 威烈	Ji Wu 姬午	425–402 (22–23 years)		Son of Kao	–
An 安	Ji Jiao 姬驕	401–376 (24–25 years)		Son of Weilie	Wei increased in power
Lie 烈	Ji Xi 姬喜	375–369 (5–6 years)		Son of An	–
Xian 顯	Ji Bian 姬扁	368–321 (46–47 years)		Son of An	Qin began to rise in power
Shenjing 慎靚	Ji Ding 姬定	320–315 (5–6 years)		Son of Xian	Qin's power grew significantly during his reign
Nan 赧	Ji Yan 姬延	314–256 (57–58 years)		Son of Shenjing	Longest reigning Zhou ruler, though held little power amid the divided kingdom. Conquered and deposed by King Zhaoxiang of Qin

== Early imperial China ==
=== Qin dynasty (221–207 BCE) ===
Qin dynasty (秦朝; 221–207 BCE)
Dynastic name	Personal name	Reign	Succession	Life details
Qin Shi Huang (Note: In his lifetime, Ying Zheng would have been known as simply "Shi Huangdi", but after the Qin's fall it became standard practice to include the dynasty's name when referring to him. His dynastic name is commonly abbreviated to 'Qin Shi Huang'. In its fullest form, it would be: Qin Shi Huangdi (秦始皇帝)) 秦始皇	Ying Zheng 嬴政 Zhao Zheng 趙政	221 (Note: Qin Shi Huang began his reign as king of Qin in 246 BCE, but did not unite China and proclaim himself Emperor (皇帝 Huangdi) until 221 BCE.) – July 210 BCE (Note: Moule 1957, p. 3 gives 18 July 210 BCE as the exact date for the end of Qin Shi Huang's reign, but also notes the issues surrounding this chronology. The date is accepted by Vervoorn 1990, p. 311, but it's not used by modern scholars. Hymes 2000, p. 8 gives July–August 210 BCE, the seventh lunar month.) (11 years)	Son of King Zhuangxiang of Qin. As King Zheng of Qin, he conquered the six other states during the Warring States period and proclaimed himself Emperor (皇帝; Huangdi).	259 – July 210 BCE (48–49 years) Instilled a Legalist philosophy, combined preexisting walls into the Great Wall of China, and built the Lingqu canal and the Terracotta Army. Died of sudden illness, possibly alchemical elixir poisoning
Qin Er Shi (Note: In its fullest form, Ying Huhai's dynastic name would be Qin Er Shi Huangdi (秦二世皇帝)) 秦二世	Ying Huhai 嬴胡亥	late 210 (Note: Sources vary on the exact month of Qin Er Shi's accession, though they agree it was in late 210. Vervoorn 1990, p. 311 gives August 210 while Barbieri-Low & Yates 2015, p. xix and Moule 1957, p. 3 give September–October 210) – October 207 BCE (3 years)	Second son of Qin Shi Huang. Put on the throne by Li Si and Zhao Gao, who forced the appointed heir Fusu to commit suicide.	231/222 – October 207 BCE (23–24/14–15 years) His reign was completely dominated by Zhao Gao. Forced by Zhao to commit suicide. Was briefly succeeded by king Ziying, who ruled only 46 days (Note: After Qin Er Shi's death the Qin dynasty became increasingly weaker in power, and when Ziying (子嬰) ascended to the throne, he only ruled as a King (Wang) of Qin. After ruling for 46 days in late 207 BCE, Ziying surrendered to Liu Bang and was later killed by Xiang Yu during the Chu–Han Contention.)
Following the collapse of the Qin dynasty, Xiang Yu established the Eighteen Kingdoms and proclaimed himself "Hegemon-King" (霸王). The Chu–Han Contention began in 206 BCE and ended with Liu Bang inaugurating the Han dynasty in 202 BCE

=== Han and Xin dynasties (202 BCE – 220 CE) ===
(#) – contested legitimacy

Han (漢朝; 202 BCE – 9 CE; 25–220 CE) and Xin (新; 9–23 CE) dynasties
Posthumous name	Personal name	Reign	Succession	Life details
==== Western Han (202 BCE – 9 CE) ====
Gaozu 高祖 Gao 高帝	Liu Bang 劉邦	28 February 202 (Note: Liu Bang began his peasant revolt in 209 BCE, during the collapse of the Qin dynasty. He assumed the title "King of Han" (漢王) in 206 BCE, referencing his dominions near the Han river. He only assumed the title of Emperor (皇帝; Huangdi) in 202 BCE after his victory in the Chu–Han Contention.)– 1 June 195 BCE (7 years, 3 months and 4 days)	Unified China and proclaimed himself Emperor after victory in the Chu–Han Contention	256 – 1 June 195 BCE (aged 61) Among the most revered Chinese emperors. Died from an arrow injury in a campaign against Ying Bu
Hui 惠帝	Liu Ying 劉盈	23 June 195 – 26 September 188 BCE (7 years, 3 months and 3 days)	Son of Gao	210 – 26 September 188 BCE (aged 22) His reign was largely dominated by his mother Empress Lü. Died from an unknown illness
Qianshao (Note: Also known as: Shaodi Gong 少帝恭) (#) 前少帝	Liu Gong 劉恭	19 October 188 – 15 June 184 BCE (3 years, 7 months and 27 days)	Purportedly a son of Hui (Note: In order to justify Emperor Wen of Han's overthrow of the House of Lü's puppets, Houshao and Qianshao, both of the dynasty's official histories—the Shiji and Hanshu—assert that neither was actually a son of Hui.)	? – after 184 BCE An infant emperor whose reign was completely dominated by Empress Lü. Deposed and put under house arrest; unknown date of death after 184
Houshao (Note: Also known as: Shaodi Hong 少帝弘) (#) 後少帝	Liu Yi 劉盈 Liu Hong 劉弘	15 June 184 – 15 August 180 BCE (4 years and 2 months)	Purportedly a son of Hui	? – 14 November 180 An infant emperor whose reign was completely dominated by Empress Lü. Put to death by the House of Lü
Wen 文帝	Liu Heng 劉恆	14 November 180 – 6 July 157 BCE (22 years, 5 months and 23 days) Era(s): Qianyuan (前元) 25 November 180 – 14 November 164 BCE; Houyuan (後元) 15 November 164 – 28 October 157 BCE	Son of Gao	203/202 – 6 July 157 BCE (aged 46) Died of natural causes
Jing 景帝	Liu Qi 劉啟	14 July 157 – 10 March 141 BCE (15 years, 7 months and 24 days) Era(s): Qianyuan (前元) 29 October 157 – 10 November 150 BCE; Zhongyuan (中元) 11 November 149 – 3 November 144 BCE; Houyuan (後元) 4 November 143 – 31 October 141 BCE	Son of Wen	188 – 10 March 141 BCE (aged 47) Died of natural causes
Wu 武帝	Liu Che 劉徹	10 March 141 – 29 March 87 BCE (Note: Though most modern sources agree that Emperor Wu died on 29 March 87 BCE, Vervoorn 1990, p. 312 gives 2 March; Moule 1957, p. 5 gives 27 March.) (54 years and 19 days) Era(s): Jianyuan (建元) 1 November 141 – 25 October 135 BCE; Yuanguang (元光) 26 October 135 – 17 November 129 BCE; Yuanshuo (元朔) 18 November 129 – 11 November 123 BCE; Yuanshou (元狩) 12 November 123 – 5 November 117 BCE; Yuanding (元鼎) 6 November 117 – 14 May 110 BCE; Yuanfeng (元封) 15 May 110 – 24 June 104 BCE; Taichu (太初) 25 June 104 – 5 February 100 BCE; Tianhan (天漢) 6 February 100 – 22 January 96 BCE; Taishi (太始) 23 January 96 – 6 February 92 BCE; Zhenghe (征和) 7 February 92 – 23 January 88 BCE; Houyuan (後元) 24 January 88 – 29 March 87 BCE	Son of Jing	157/156 – 29 March 87 BCE (aged 69) Among the longest reigning and highly regarded Chinese emperors. Expanded the Han dynasty considerably. Died from an unknown illness
Zhao 昭帝	Liu Fuling 劉弗陵	30 March 87 – 5 June 74 BCE (13 years, 2 months and 6 days) Era(s): Shiyuan (始元) 1 February 86 – 25 January 80 BCE; Yuanfeng (元鳳) 26 January 80 – 18 February 74 BCE; Yuanping (元平) 19 February 74 – 8 February 73 BCE	Son of Wu	94 – 5 June 74 BCE (aged 20) Died from natural causes
None, known as Marquis of Haihun (#) 海昏侯	Liu He 劉賀	18 July – 14 August 74 BCE (27 days)	Grandson of Wu	92–59 BCE (aged 32–33) Briefly installed by Huo Guang and not often considered legitimate. Died from natural causes
Xuan 宣帝	Liu Bingyi 劉病已 Liu Xun 劉詢	10 September 74 – 10 January 48 BCE (25 years and 4 months) Era(s): Benshi (本始) 8 February 73 – 24 January 69 BCE; Dijie (地節) 25 January 69 – 8 February 65 BCE; Yuankang (元康) 9 February 65 – 25 January 61 BCE; Shenjue (神爵) 26 January 61 – 10 February 57 BCE; Wufeng (五鳳) 11 February 57 – 27 January 53 BCE; Ganlu (甘露) 28 January 53 – 12 February 49 BCE; Huanglong (黃龍) 13 February 49 – 10 January 48 BCE	Great-grandson Wu	91 – 10 January 48 BCE (aged 43) His reign is sometimes considered a cultural and political 'renaissance'. Died from natural causes
Yuan 元帝	Liu Shi 劉奭	29 January 48 – 3 July 33 BCE (15 years, 5 months and 4 days) Era(s): Chuyuan (初元) 1 February 48 – 5 February 43 BCE; Yongguang (永光) 6 February 43 – 10 February 39 BCE; Jianzhao (建昭) 11 February 38 – 15 February 34 BCE; Jingning (竟寧) 16 February 33 – 3 July 33 BCE	Son of Xuan	75 – 8 July 33 BCE (aged 42) Died from an unknown illness
Cheng 成帝	Liu Ao 劉驁	4 August 33 – 17 April 7 BCE (25 years, 8 months and 13 days) Era(s): Jianshi (建始) 4 February 32 – late 28 BCE; Heping (河平) late 28 – 10 August 25 BCE; Yangshuo (陽朔) 11 August 25 – 20 February 20 BCE; Hongjia (鴻嘉) 21 February 20 – 6 February 17 BCE; Yongshi (永始) 7 February 16 – 23 January 13 BCE; Yuanyan (元延) 24 January 12 – 8 February 8 BCE; Suihe (綏和) 9 February 8 – 17 April 7 BCE	Son of Yuan	51 – 17 April 7 BCE (aged 44) Died from a stroke or possibly complications from an aphrodisiac overdose
Ai 哀帝	Liu Xin 劉欣	7 May 7 – 15 August 1 BCE (6 years, 3 months and 8 days) Era(s): Jianping (建平) 17 February 6 – 2 February 2 BCE; Taichu Yuan Jiang (太初元將) 9 July – September 5 BCE; Yuanshou (元壽) 3 February 2 – 11 February 1 CE	Grandson of Yuan	27 – 15 August 1 BCE (aged 26) Died from an unknown illness
Ping 平帝	Liu Kan 劉衎	17 October 1 BCE – 3 February 6 CE (6 years, 3 months and 17 days) Era(s): Yuanshi (元始) 12 February 1 CE – 16 February 6 CE	Grandson of Yuan	9 BCE – 3 February 6 CE (aged 14) His reign was dominated by Wang Zhengjun and Wang Mang. He was murdered, possibly by orders from the latter.
None, known as Ruzi Ying (#) 孺子嬰	Liu Ying 劉嬰	17 April 6 – 10 January 9 CE (2 years, 8 months and 24 days) Era(s): Jushe (居攝) 17 February 6 – 27 January 8 CE; Chushi (初始) 27 January – 10 January 9 CE	Cousin-once-removed of Ping	5 – 25 CE (aged 20) A child puppet of Wang Mang; often not considered legitimate. He later attempted to succeed the Gengshi Emperor, but was killed by him
==== Xin dynasty (9–23 CE) ====
—	Wang Mang 王莽	10 January 9 – 6 October 23 CE (14 years, 8 months and 26 days) Era(s): Shijianguo (始建國) 15 January 9 – 19 January 14 CE; Tianfeng (天鳳) 20 January 14 – 13 January 20 CE; Dihuang (地皇) 14 January 20 – 6 October 23 CE	After dominating the reign of Emperor Ping, Wang Mang overthrew him and established the short-lived Xin dynasty	46 BCE – 6 October 23 CE (aged 68) Established the Xin dynasty, but his drastic reforms incited the Red Eyebrows and Lulin peasant rebellions which collapsed the dynasty.
==== Gengshi Emperor (23–25 CE) ====
None, known by his era: Gengshi (#) 更始帝	Liu Xuan 劉玄	11 March 23 – November 25 CE (2 years and 8 months) Era(s): Gengshi (更始) 10 February 23 – November 25 CE	Descendant of Jing	? – November 25 CE Strangled on the orders of Xie Lu, a leader of the Red Eyebrows. Sometimes considered a pretender and illegitimate
==== Eastern Han (25–220 CE) ====
Guangwu 光武帝	Liu Xiu 劉秀	5 August 25 – 29 March 57 CE (31 years, 7 months and 24 days) Era(s): Jianwu (建武) 5 August 25 – 13 May 56 CE; Jianwezhongyuan (建武中元) 14 May 56 – 12 February 57 CE	Descendant of Jing	15 January 5 BCE – 29 March 57 CE (aged 62) Died of natural causes
Ming 明帝	Liu Yang 劉陽 Liu Zhuang 劉莊	29 March 57 – 5 September 75 CE (18 years, 5 months and 7 days) Era(s): Yongping (永平) 13 February 58 – 23 February 76 CE	Son of Guangwu	28 – 5 September 75 CE (aged 48) Died of natural causes
Zhang 章帝	Liu Da 劉炟	5 September 75 – 9 April 88 CE (12 years, 7 months and 4 days) Era(s): Jianchu (建初) 24 February 76 – 26 January 84 CE; Yuanhe (元和) 27 January 84 – 11 September 87 CE; Zhanghe (章和) 12 September 87 – 29 April 88 CE	Son of Ming	56 – 9 April 88 CE (aged 32) His reign marked the beginning of the Han's decline. Died of natural causes
He 和帝	Liu Zhao 劉肇	9 April 88 – 13 February 106 CE (17 years, 10 months and 4 days) Era(s): Yongyuan (永元) 30 January 89 – 17 May 105 CE; Yuanxing (元興) 18 May 105 – 20 February 106 CE	Son of Zhang	79 – 13 February 106 (aged 27) Died of natural causes
Shang 殤帝	Liu Long 劉隆	13 February – 21 September 106 CE (7 months and 8 days) Era(s): Yanping (延平) 21 February 106 – 9 February 107 CE	Son of He	105 – 21 September 106 (aged 1) The youngest (Note: Not counting Ruzi Ying, who never officially ascended to the throne.) and shortest-living Chinese emperor. Died of natural causes
An 安帝	Liu Hu 劉祜 Liu You 劉友	23 September 106 – 30 April 125 CE (18 years, 7 months and 7 days) Era(s): Yongchu (永初) 10 February 107 – 23 February 113 CE; Yuanchu (元初) 24 February 114 – 24 May 120 CE; Yongning (永寧) 25 May 120 – 30 September 121 CE; Jianguang (建光) 1 August 121 – 24 April 122 CE; Yanguang (延光) 25 April 122 – 30 April 125 CE	Grandson of Zhang	94 – 30 April 125 (aged 32) Died of natural causes
None, known as Marquess of Beixiang (#) 北鄉侯	Liu Yi 劉懿	18 May – 10 December 125 CE (Note: Liu Yi reigned for less than a year, so thus did not live long enough to receive an era name) (6 months and 22 days)	Grandson of Emperor Zhang	?–125 CE Briefly reigned, probably as a child; often not considered legitimate. Died of natural causes
Shun 順帝	Liu Bao 劉保	16 December 125 – 20 September 144 (18 years, 9 months and 4 days) Era(s): Yongjian (永建) 10 February 126 – 15 April 132 CE; Yangjia (陽嘉) 16 April 132 – 4 March 135 CE; Yonghe (永和) 5 March 136 – 25 February 142 CE; Han'an (漢安) 26 February 142 – 2 June 144 CE; Jiankang (建康) 3 June 144 – 9 February 145 CE	Son of An	115 – 20 September 144 CE (aged 29) Died of natural causes
Chong 沖帝	Liu Bing 劉炳	20 September 144 – 15 February 145 (4 months and 26 days) Era(s): Yongxi (永嘉) 10 February 145 – 29 January 146 CE	Son of Shun	143 – 15 February 145 CE (aged 2) Died of natural causes
Zhi 質帝	Liu Zuan 劉纘	6 March 145 – 26 July 146 (1 year, 4 months and 20 days) Era(s): Benchu (本初) 30 January 146 – 17 February 147 CE	Cousin of Chong and great-grandson of Emperor Zhang	138 – 26 July 146 CE (aged 7–8) His reign was dominated by Liang Ji, who may have poisoned him. Otherwise he died from food poisoning
Huan 桓帝	Liu Zhi 劉志	1 August 146 – 25 January 168 (21 years, 5 months and 24 days) Era(s): Jianhe (建和) 18 February 147 – 14 February 150 CE; Heping (和平) 15 February 150 – 18 February 151 CE; Yuanjia (元嘉) 19 February 151 – 30 June 153 CE; Yongxing (永興) 1 July 153 – 4 March 155 CE; Yongshou (永壽) 5 March 155 – 16 July 158 CE; Yanxi (延熹) 17 July 158 – 11 July 167 CE; Yongkang (永康) 12 July 167 – 16 February 168 CE	Great-grandson of Zhang	132 – 25 January 168 CE (aged 36) Died of natural causes
Ling 靈帝	Liu Hong 劉宏	17 February 168 – 13 May 189 (21 years and 24 days) Era(s): Jianning (建寧) 17 February 168 – 23 June 172 CE; Xiping (熹平) 24 June 172 – 25 April 178 CE; Guanghe (光和) 26 April 178 – 15 February 185 CE; Zhongping (中平) 16 February 184 – 14 May 189 CE	Great-great-grandson of Zhang	156 – 13 May 189 CE (aged 32–33) Died of an unknown illness
Prince of Hongnong (#) 弘農王	Liu Bian 劉辯	15 May – 28 September 189 CE (6 months and 13 days) Era(s): Guingxi (光熹) 15 May – 24 September 189 CE; Zhaoning (昭宁) 25–27 September 189 CE	Son of Ling	173/176 – 22 March 190 CE (aged 13–14) Briefly reigned as a child; often not considered legitimate. Poisoned by Dong Zhuo
Xian 獻帝	Liu Xie 劉協	28 September 189 – 11 December 220 (Note: de Crespigny 2010, p. 450 notes that "On 11 December [...] Cao Cao's son and successor Cao Pi received the abdication of the last emperor of Han. [...] Some authorities give the date of abdication as 25 November [...] This is the date upon which Emperor Xian issued an edict calling upon Cao Pi to take the throne, but the ceremonial transfer of sovereignty was carried out two weeks later") (31 years, 2 months and 23 days) Era(s): Yonghan (永汉) 28 September 189 – 18 February 190 CE; Zhongping (中平) 19–22 February 193 CE; Chuping (初平) 23 February 190 – 20 February 194 CE; Xingping (兴平) 21 February 194 – 22 February 196 CE; Jian'an (建安) 23 February 196 – 20 March 220 CE; Yankang (延康) 21 March – 11 December 220 CE	Son of Ling	2 April 181 – 21 April 234 (aged 53) A puppet of Dong Zhuo and later Cao Cao. Forced to abdicate by Cao Pi, but spared. Died of natural causes
Cao Cao is defeated at the Battle of Red Cliffs by Sun Quan and Liu Bei, preventing him from uniting seceded southern Han territory. The region becomes split into three competing powers: Cao Wei, Eastern Wu, and Shu Han.

== Six Dynasties ==
=== Three Kingdoms (220–280) ===
==== Cao Wei (220–266) ====
Cao Wei (曹魏; 220–266)
Personal name	Posthumous name	Reign	Succession	Life details
Cao Pi 曹丕	Emperor Wen 文帝	11 December 220 – 29 June 226 (5 years, 6 months and 18 days) Era(s): Huangchu (黃初) December 220–226	The eldest surviving son of Cao Cao. Inherited what lands the Eastern Han dynasty still controlled to found the Cao Wei state	187 – 29 June 226 (aged 38–39) Died of natural causes
Cao Rui 曹叡	Emperor Ming 明帝	29 June 226 – 22 January 239 (12 years, 6 months and 24 days) Era(s): Taihe (太和) 227–233; Qinglong (青龍) 233–237; Jingchu (景初) 237–239	Son of Cao Pi and grandson of Cao Cao	c. 206 – 22 January 239 (aged 34–35) Died of natural causes
Cao Fang 曹芳	Emperor Shao 少帝 Emperor Fei 廢帝	22 January 239 – 16 October 254 (15 years, 8 months and 24 days) Era(s): Zhengshi (正始) 240 – 7 May 249; Jiaping (嘉平) 8 May 249 – 1 November 254	Adopted heir by Cao Rui, who had no sons of his own. He was presumably related to the imperial family in some way	231–274 (aged 42–43) His reign was completely dominated by Cao Shuang, Sima Yi and Sima Shi, the latter of which eventually deposed Cao Fang. Died of natural causes
Cao Mao 曹髦	Duke of Gaogui District 高貴鄉公	2 November 254 – 2 June 260 (5 years and 7 months) Era(s): Zhengyuan (正元) 2 November 254 – 9 July 256; Ganlu (甘露) 10 July 256 – 13 July 260	The cousin of Cao Fang and grandson of Cao Pi. Put on the throne by Sima Shi	c. 241 – 9 July 260 (aged 18–19) His reign was completely dominated by Sima Shi and Sima Zhao. Died in a failed coup to regain power from Sima Zhao
Cao Huan 曹奐	Emperor Yuan 元皇帝	27 July 260 – 4 February 266 (5 years, 6 months and 8 days) Era(s): Jingyuan (景元) 8 July 260 – June 264; Xianxi (咸熙) June 264 – 4 February 266	Grandson of Cao Cao and the first cousin once-removed of Cao Mao	245–302 (aged 56–57) His reign was completely dominated by Sima Zhao and Sima Yan. Died of natural causes

==== Shu Han (221–263) ====
Shu Han (蜀漢; 221–263)
Personal name	Posthumous name	Reign	Succession	Life details
Liu Bei 劉備	Emperor Zhaolie 昭烈皇帝	15 May 221 – 10 June 223 (2 years and 26 days) Era(s): Zhangwu (章武) 221–223	Claimed to descend from Emperor Jing of Han. Conquered the Yi Province to found the Shu Han state	161 – 10 June 223 (aged 61–62) Died of natural causes
Liu Shan 劉禪	Emperor Xiaohuai 孝懷皇帝	June 223 – December 263 (40 years and 6 months) Era(s): Jianxing (建興) 223–237; Yanxi (延熙) 238–257; Jingyao (景耀) 258–263; Yanxing (炎興) 263	The son of Liu Bei	207–271 (aged 63–64) Abdicated after the fall on the Shu capital of Chengdu in 263.

==== Eastern Wu (222–280) ====
Eastern Wu (東吳; 222–280)
Personal name	Posthumous name	Reign	Succession	Life details
Sun Quan 孫權	Emperor Da 大皇帝	23 May 229 – May 252 (22 years, 11 months and 8 days) Era(s): Huangwu (黃武) 222–229; Huanglong (黃龍) 229–231; Jiahe (嘉禾) 232–238; Chiwu (赤烏) 238–251; Taiyuan (太元) 251–252; Shenfeng (神鳳) 252	The son of Sun Jian; inherited the conquests of his brother Sun Ce. Proclaimed "King of Wu" in 221 and later "Emperor" in 229	182–252 (aged 69–70) Died of natural causes
Sun Liang 孫亮	Emperor Fei 吳廢帝	May 252 – 9 November 258 (6 years, 6 months and 8 days) Era(s): Jianxing (建興) 252–253; Wufeng (五鳳) 254–256; Taiping (太平) 256–258	Son of Sun Quan	243–260 (aged 16–17) His reign was completely dominated by three successive regents: Zhuge Ke, Sun Jun and Sun Chen. He was later deposed and died of natural causes
Sun Xiu 孫休	Emperor Jing 景皇帝	30 November 258 – 3 September 264 (5 years, 11 months and 4 days) Era(s): Yongan (永安) 258–264	Son of Sun Quan	235–264 (aged 28–29) Died of natural causes
Sun Hao 孫皓	Emperor Mo 末帝	3 September 264 – 1 May 280 (15 years, 5 months and 28 days) Era(s): Yuanxing (元興) 264–265; Ganlu (甘露) 265–266; Baoding (寶鼎) 266–269; Jianheng (建衡) 269–271; Fenghuang (鳳凰) 272–274; Tiance (天冊) 275–276; Tianxi (天璽) 276; Tianji (天紀) 277–280	Son of Sun He, former heir apparent to Sun Quan	241–283 (aged 41–42) Eastern Wu was conquered by Sima Yan in 280. Died of natural causes

=== Jin dynasty (266–420) ===
Jin dynasty (晉朝; 266–420)
Posthumous name	Personal name	Reign	Succession	Life details
==== Western Jin (266–316) ====
Emperor Wu 晉武帝	Sima Yan 司馬炎	8 February 266 – 16 May 290 (24 years, 4 months and 8 days) Era(s): Taishi (泰始) 266–274; Xianning (咸寧) 275–280; Taikang (太康) 280–289; Taixi (太熙) 290	Son of Prince Sima Zhao, proclaimed emperor after the abdication of Cao Huan of Wei. He unified China after conquering Eastern Wu in 280	236–290 (aged 53–54) Died of natural causes
Emperor Hui 晉惠帝	Sima Zhong 司馬衷	16 May 290 – 8 January 307 (16 years, 7 months and 23 days) Era(s): Yongxi (永熙) 290; Yongping (永平) 291; Yuankang (元康) 291–299; Yongkang (永康) 300–301; Yongning (永寧) 301–302; Taian (太安) 302–303; Yongan (永安) 304; Jianwu (建武) 304; Yongan (永安) 304; Yongxing (永興) 305–306; Guangxi (光熙) 306	Son of Emperor Wu, ruled under the regency of his wife, Jia Nanfeng, until her death in 300 CE	259–307 (aged 47–48) Possibly mentally unstable, his reign was marked by the disastrous War of the Eight Princes. He was poisoned by Sima Yue
—	Sima Lun 司馬倫	3 February – 30 May 301 (3 months and 27 days) Era(s): Jianshi (建始) 301	Prince of Zhao and son of Sima Yi, briefly usurped power from Emperor Hu	One of the infamous Eight Princes; often seen as an usurper. He was forced to commit suicide by Princes Jiong, Ying and Yong
Emperor Huai 晉懷帝	Sima Chi 司馬熾	8 January 307 – 14 March 313 (6 years, 2 months and 6 days) Era(s): Yongjia (永嘉) 307–313	Younger brother of Emperor Hui	284–313 (aged 30–31) His reign, dominated by Sima Yue, saw widespread ethnic rebellions. He was deposed and killed by the Han-Zhao
Emperor Min 晉愍帝	Sima Ye 司馬鄴	14 March 313 – 7 February 316 (2 years, 10 months and 24 days) Era(s): Jianxing (建興) 313–317	Nephew of Emperor Huai, proclaimed emperor in Chang'an after the fall of Luoyang to the Five Barbarians.	300 – 7 February 316 (aged 15–16) Killed by Liu Cong of Han-Zhao
==== Eastern Jin (318–420) ====
Emperor Yuan 晉元帝	Sima Rui 司馬睿	26 April 318 – 3 January 323 (4 years, 8 months and 8 days) Era(s): Jianwu (建武) 317–318; Taixing (太興) 318–322; Yongchang (永昌) 322–323	Great-grandson of Sima Yi, proclaimed himself emperor with the help of Wang Dun in Jiankang after the fall of Chang'an.	276 – 323 (aged 47) Died of natural causes
Emperor Ming 晉明帝	Sima Shao 司馬紹	3 January 323 – 18 October 325 (2 years, 9 months and 15 days) Era(s): Taining (太寧) 323–326	Son of Emperor Yuan	299 – 325 (aged 26) His reign was dominated by Wang Dao and antagonized by Wang Dun. Died of natural causes
Emperor Cheng 晉成帝	Sima Yan 司馬衍	19 October 325 – 26 July 342 (16 years, 9 months and 7 days) Era(s): Xianhe (咸和) 326–335; Xiankang (咸康) 335–342	Son of Emperor Ming, ruled initially under the regency of Yu Wenjun	321 – 342 (aged 21) Dominated by Yu Liang, he was briefly deposed in 328 by rebel Su Jun. Died of natural causes
Emperor Kang 晉康帝	Sima Yue 司馬岳	27 July 342 – 17 November 344 (2 years, 3 months and 21 days) Era(s): Jianyuan (建元) 343–344	Son of Emperor Ming	322 – 344 (aged 22) Died of natural causes
Emperor Mu 晉穆帝	Sima Dan 司馬聃	18 November 344 – 10 July 361 (16 years, 7 months and 22 days) Era(s): Yonghe (永和) 345–357; Shengping (升平) 357–361	Son of Emperor Kang, "ruled" under the regency of Empress Dowager Chu until 357	343 – 361 (aged 18) The youngest Chinese emperor. (Note: Not counting Ruzi Ying, who never officially ascended to the throne.) Died of natural causes
Emperor Ai 晉哀帝	Sima Pi 司馬丕	13 July 361 – 30 March 365 (3 years, 8 months and 17 days) Era(s): Longhe (隆和) 362–363; Xingning (興寧) 363–365	Son of Emperor Cheng, reigned alongside Empress Dowager Chu	341 – 365 (aged 24) Died of drug poisoning
none, known as: Emperor Fei (Note: Also known as: Duke of Haixi 海西公) 晉廢帝	Sima Yi 司馬奕	31 March 365 – 6 January 372 (6 years, 9 months and 6 days) Era(s): Taihe (太和) 366–372	Son of Emperor Cheng	342 – 386 (aged 44) Deposed by Huan Wen, later dying of natural causes
Emperor Jianwen 晉簡文帝	Sima Yu 司馬昱	6 January – 19 August 372 (7 months and 13 days) Era(s): Xianan (咸安) 372	Son of Emperor Yuan and great-great-grandson of Sima Yi, enthroned by Huan Wen	320 – 372 (aged 52) Died of natural causes
Emperor Xiaowu 晉孝武帝	Sima Yao 司馬曜	19 August 372 – 6 November 396 (24 years, 2 months and 18 days) Era(s): Ningkang (寧康) 373–376; Taiyuan (太元) 376–397	Son of Emperor Jianwen	362 – 396 (aged 34) His army's defeat of the Former Qin army at the Battle of Fei River led to the eventual collapse of the Former Qin. Killed by a jealous concubine
Emperor An 晉安帝	Sima Dezong 司馬德宗	7 November 396 – 28 January 419 (22 years, 2 months and 21 days) Era(s): Longan (隆安) 397–402; Yuanxing (元興) 402–405; Yixi (義熙) 405–419	Son of Emperor Xiaowu	382/3 – 419 (aged 36–37) Dominated by Sima Daozi, Huan Xuan and Liu Yu, he was killed by the latter
Emperor Gong 晉恭帝	Sima Dewen 司馬德文	28 January 419 – 5 July 420 (1 year, 5 months and 7 days) Era(s): Yuanxi (元熙) 419–420	Son of Emperor Xiaowu	386 – 12 November 421 (aged 35) Abdicated in favor of Liu Yu (Emperor Wu of Song), later assassinated

=== Sixteen Kingdoms (304–439) ===
Cheng Han (成漢; 304–347)
Personal name	Posthumous name	Reign	Succession	Life details
Li Xiong 李雄	Emperor Wu 武皇帝	304–334 (29–30 years) Era(s): Jianxing (建興) 304–306; Yanping (晏平) 306–311; Yuheng (玉衡) 311–334	Son of rebel Li Te, proclaimed himself King in 304 and then Emperor in 306	274–334 (aged 59–60) Died of disease
Li Ban 李班	Emperor Ai 哀皇帝	334 (less than a year)	Nephew of Li Xiong	274–334 (aged 59–60) Killed by Li Qi
Li Qi 李期	Duke You 幽公	334–338 (3–4 years) Era(s): Yuheng (玉恆) 335–338	Son of Li Xiong	314–338 (aged 23–24) Committed suicide
Li Shou 李壽	Emperor Xiaowen 昭文皇帝	338–343 (4–5 years) Era(s): Hanxing (漢興) 338–344	Nephew of Li Te, usurped power from Li Qi and renamed the state from "Cheng” to “Han”	300–343 (aged 42–43) Died of natural causes
Li Shi 李勢	Marquess of Guiyi 歸義侯	343–347 (3–4 years) Era(s): Taihe (太和) 343–346; Jianing (嘉寧) 346–347	Son of Li Shou	Abdicated to Huan Wen after the fall of Cheng in 347. Died of natural causes in 361 in the Eastern Jin capital

Han-Zhao (漢趙; 304–319) / Former Zhao (前趙; 319–329)
Personal name	Posthumous name	Reign	Succession	Life details
Liu Yuan 劉淵	Emperor Guangwen 光文皇帝	304–310 (5–6 years) Era(s): Yuanxi (元熙) 304–308; Yongfeng (永鳳) 308–309; Herui (河瑞) 309–310	Rebelled against the Jin dynasty. Proclaimed himself King of Han in 304 and Emperor in 308	c. 250–310 (aged approx. 60) Died of natural causes
Liu He 劉和	–	310 (less than a year)	Son of Liu Yuan	Killed by his brother Liu Cong
Liu Cong 劉聰	Emperor Zhaowu 昭武皇帝	310–318 (7–8 years) Era(s): Guangxing (光興) 310–311; Jiaping (嘉平) 311–315; Jianyuan (建元) 315–316; Linjia (麟嘉) 316–318	Son of Liu Yuan	Died of natural causes in 318
Liu Can 劉粲	Emperor Yin 隱皇帝	318 (less than a year)	Son of Liu Cong	Killed by officer Jin Zhun in 318
Liu Yao 劉曜	–	318–329 (10–11 years) Era(s): Guangchu (光初) 318–329	Nephew of Liu Yuan, changed the dynastic title from "Han" to "Zhao"	Ended the Western Jin in 316. Captured and killed by Shi Le of Later Zhao

Later Zhao (後趙; 319–351)
Personal name	Posthumous name	Reign	Succession	Life details
Shi Le 石勒	Emperor Ming 明皇帝	319–333 (13–14 years) Era(s): Zhaowang (趙王) 319–328; Taihe (太和) 328–330; Jianping (建平) 330–333	Rebelled with Ji Sang during the War of the Eight Princes. Proclaimed himself King of Zhao in 319 and then Emperor in 330	374–333 (aged 58–59) Ended the Former Zhao in 329. Died of natural causes
Shi Hong 石弘	–	333–334 (0–1 years) Era(s): Yanxi (延熙) 334	Son of Shi Le	313–334 (aged 20–21) Deposed and killed by Shi Hu
Shi Hu 石虎	Emperor Wu 武皇帝	334–349 (14–15 years) Era(s): Jianwu (建武) 335–349; Taining (太寧) 349	Nephew of Shi Le, usurped power from Shi Hong in 334. Ruled as Heavenly King until 349	295–349 (aged 53–54) Died of natural causes
Shi Shi 石世	–	349 (less than a year)	Son of Shi Hu	339–349 (aged 9–10) Murdered
Shi Zun 石遵	–	349 (less than a year)	Son of Shi Hu	Killed by Ran Min
Shi Jian 石鑒	–	349–350 (0–1 years) Era(s): Qinglong (青龍) 350	Son of Shi Hu, enthroned by Ran Min	Killed by Ran Min
Shi Zhi 石祇	–	350–351 (0–1 years) Era(s): Yongning (永寧) 350–351	Son of Shi Hu	Gave up the imperial title in 351, later killed by a subordinate officer

Former Liang (前涼; 320–376)
Personal name	Posthumous name	Reign	Succession	Life details
Zhang Mao 張茂	Duke Cheng 成公	320–324 (3–4 years)	Son of governor Zhang Gui	277–324 (aged 46-47) Made vassal of Former Zhao in 323. Died of natural causes
Zhang Jun 張駿	Duke Zhongcheng 忠成公	324–346 (21–22 years)	Son of governor Zhang Shi	307–346 (aged 38–39) Died of natural causes
Zhang Chonghua 張重華	Duke Huan 桓公	346–353 (6–7 years)	Son of Zhang Jun, didn't assume the dynastic title until 349	327–353 (aged 25–26) Died of natural causes
Zhang Yaoling 張曜靈	Duke Ai 哀公	353 (less than a year)	Son of Zhang Chonghua	344–355 (aged 25–26) Killed by Zhang Zuo
Zhang Zuo 張祚	King Wei 威王	354–355 (0–1 years) Era(s): Heping (和平) 354–355	Son of Zhang Jun	Discontinued the use of Western Jin era names before being killed in 355
Zhang Xuanjing 張玄靚	Duke Chong 沖公	355–363 (7–8 years) Era(s): Taishi (太始) 355–356	Son of Zhang Chonghua	350–363 (aged 12–13) Killed by Zhang Tianxi
Zhang Tianxi 張天錫	Duke Dao 悼公	363–376 (12–13 years) Era(s): Taiqing (太清) 363–376	Son of Zhang Jun	346–406 (aged 59–60) Surrendered to the Former Qin, later dying of natural causes in Eastern Jin

Former Yan (前燕; 337–370)
Personal name	Posthumous name	Reign	Succession	Life details
Murong Huang 慕容皝	Emperor Wenming 文明皇帝	337–348 (10–11 years)	Son of governor Murong Hui, proclaimed himself Prince of Yan in 337. Remained loyal to the Jin	297–348 (aged 50–51) Died of natural causes
Murong Jun 慕容儁	Emperor Jingzhao 景昭皇帝	348–360 (11–12 years) Era(s): Yuanxi (元璽) 353–357; Guangshou (光壽) 357–360	Son of Murong Huang, proclaimed himself Emperor in 352	319–360 (aged 38–39) Died of natural causes
Murong Wei 慕容暐	Emperor You 幽皇帝	360–370 (9–10 years) Era(s): Jianxi (建熙) 360–370	Son of Murong Jun, ruled under the regency of Murong Ping	350–384 (aged 33–34) Captured by Former Qin in 370, executed by Fu Jiān in 384 after a failed coup

Former Qin (前秦; 351–394)
Personal name	Posthumous name	Reign	Succession	Life details
Fu Jiàn 苻健	Emperor Jingming 景明皇帝	351–355 (3–4 years) Era(s): Huangshi (皇始) 351–355	Son of Prince Hong, leader of the Di. Proclaimed Heavenly King and Great Chanyu after Hong's murder in 351, became Emperor in 352	307 or 317–355 (aged 48 or 38) Died of natural causes
Fu Sheng 苻生	Prince Li 厲王	355–357 (1–2 years) Era(s): Shouguang (壽光) 355–357	Son of Fu Jiàn	335–357 (aged 22) Killed by his cousin
Fu Jiān 苻堅	Emperor Xuanzhao 宣昭皇帝	357–385 (27–28 years) Era(s): Yongxing (永興) 357–359; Ganlu (甘露) 359–364; Jian yuan (建元) 365–385	Grandson of Fu Hong, ruled as Heavenly King	338–385 (aged 47) Conquered Former Yan, Former Liang, and Dai. Killed by Yao Chang.
Fu Pi 苻丕	Emperor Aiping 哀平皇帝	385–386 (0–1 years) Era(s): Taian (太安) 385–386	Son of Fu Jiān	Defeated by Murong Yong of Western Yan, later killed by the Eastern Jin army
Fu Deng 苻登	Emperor Gao 高皇帝	386–394 (7–8 years) Era(s): Taichu (太初) 386–394	Grandnephew of Fu Jiān	343–394 (aged 51) Killed by Yao Xing of Later Qin
Fu Chong 苻崇	–	394 (less than a year) Era(s): Yanchu (延初) 394	Son of Fu Deng	Killed by Qifu Qiangui of Western Qin

Later Yan (後燕; 384–409)
Personal name	Posthumous name	Reign	Succession	Life details
Murong Chui 慕容垂	Emperor Wucheng 成武皇帝	384–396 (11–12 years) Era(s): Jianxing (建興) 386–396	Son of Prince Murong Huang of Former Yan, reestablished his kingdom after the Battle of Fei River	326–396 (aged 70) Conquered Western Yan in 394
Murong Bao 慕容寶	Emperor Huimin 惠愍皇帝	396–398 (1–2 years) Era(s): Yongkang (永康) 396–398	Son of Murong Chui	355–398 (aged 43) Killed by the usurper Lan Han
Murong Sheng 慕容盛	Emperor Zhaowu 昭武皇帝	398–401 (2–3 years) Era(s): Jianping (建平) 398; Changle (長樂) 399–401	Son of Murong Bao, came to power after killing Lan Han	373–401 (aged 28) Killed by general Duan Ji
Murong Xi 慕容熙	Emperor Zhaowen 昭文皇帝	401–407 (5–6 years) Era(s): Guangshi (光始) 401–406; Jianshi (建始) 407	Son of Murong Chui	385–407 (aged 22) Killed by Feng Ba

Later Qin (後秦; 384–417)
Personal name	Posthumous name	Reign	Succession	Life details
Yao Chang 姚萇	Emperor Wuzhao 武昭皇帝	384–393 (8–9 years) Era(s): Baique (白雀) 384–386; Jianchu (建初) 386–393	Proclaimed King after the Battle of Fei River, then Emperor after killing Fu Jiān of Former Qin	343–394 (aged 51) Died of natural causes
Yao Xing 姚興	Emperor Wenhuan 文桓皇帝	394–416 (21–22 years) Era(s): Huangchu (皇初) 394–399; Hongshi (弘始) 399–416	Son of Yao Chang	366–416 (aged 50) Conquered Former Qin and Later Liang. Favored Buddhism and Taoism.
Yao Hong 姚泓	–	416–417 (0–1 years) Era(s): Yonghe (永和) 416–417	Son of Yao Xing	388–417 (aged 29) Executed by the Eastern Jin

Western Qin (西秦; 385–400, 409–431)
Personal name	Posthumous name	Reign	Succession	Life details
Qifu Guoren 乞伏國仁	Prince Xuanlie 宣烈王	385–388 (2–3 years) Era(s): Jianyi (建義) 385–388	Former general of Former Qin	Died of natural causes
Qifu Gangui 乞伏乾歸	Prince Wuyuan 武元王	388–412 (23–24 years) Era(s): Taichu (太初) 388–400; Gengshi (更始) 409–412	Younger brother of Qifu Guoren	Surrendered to Later Qin in 400, reclaimed the throne in 409. Killed by his nephew
Qifu Chipan 乞伏熾磐	Prince Wenzhao 文昭王	412–428 (15–16 years) Era(s): Yongkang (永康) 412–419; Jianhong (建弘) 419–428	Son of Qifu Gangui	Conquered Southern Liang in 414
Qifu Mumo 乞伏暮末	–	428–431 (2–3 years) Era(s): Yonghong (永弘) 428–431	Son of Qifu Chipan	Killed by the Xia

Later Liang (後涼; 386–403)
Personal name	Posthumous name	Reign	Succession	Life details
Lü Guang 呂光	Emperor Yiwu 懿武皇帝	386–399 (12–13 years) Era(s): Taian (太安) 386–389; Linjia (麟嘉) 389–396; Longfei (龍飛) 396–400	Former general of Former Qin, proclaimed himself Duke of Jiuquan in 386 and Heavenly King in 396	337–399 (aged 19) Abdicated in favor of his son
Lü Shao 呂紹	Prince Yin 隱王	399 (less than a year)	Son of Lü Guang	Forced to commit suicide by his brother
Lü Zuan 呂纂	Emperor Ling 靈皇帝	399–401 (1–2 years) Era(s): Xianning (咸寧) 400–401	Son of Lü Guang	Killed by Lü Chao, Guang's nephew
Lü Long 呂隆	–	401–403 (1–2 years) Era(s): Shending (神鼎) 401–403	Nephew of Lü Guang	Killed by Yao Hong of Later Qin

Southern Liang (南涼; 397–414)
Personal name	Posthumous name	Reign	Succession	Life details
Tufa Wugu 禿髮烏孤	Prince Wu 武王	397–399 (1–2 years) Era(s): Taichu (太初) 397–400	Proclaimed himself Great Chanyu	Died of natural causes
Tufa Lilugu 禿髮利鹿孤	Prince Kang 康王	399–402 (2–3 years) Era(s): Jianhe (建和) 400–402	Elder brother of Tufa Wugu	Died of natural causes
Tufa Rutan 禿髮傉檀	Prince Jing 景王	402–414 (11–12 years) Era(s): Hongchang (弘昌) 402–404; Jiaping (嘉平) 409–414	Elder brother Tufa Lilugu	364–415 (aged 51) Captured and killed by Western Qin

Northern Liang (北涼; 397–439)
Personal name	Posthumous name	Reign	Succession	Life details
Duan Ye 段業	–	397–401 (3–4 years) Era(s): Shenxi (神璽) 397–399; Tianxi (天璽) 399–401	Governor of Later Liang, proclaimed himself Prince of Liang in 397	Killed by Juqu Mengxun
Juqu Mengxun 沮渠蒙遜	–	401–433 (31–32 years) Era(s): Yongan (永安) 401–412; Xuanshi (玄始) 412–428; Chengxuan (承玄) 428–430; Yihe (義和) 430–433	Former ally of Duan Ye, proclaimed himself Duke of Zhangye	Conquered Western Liang in 421
Juqu Mujian 沮渠牧犍	Prince Ai 哀王	433–439 (5–6 years) Era(s): Shenxi (神璽) 397–399; Yonghe (永和) 433–439	Son of Juqu Mengxun	Defeated by Northern Wei, later forced to commit suicide in 449 for sedition

Southern Yan (南燕; 398–410)
Personal name	Posthumous name	Reign	Succession	Life details
Murong De 慕容德	Emperor Xianwu 獻武皇帝	398–405 (6–7 years) Era(s): Jianping (建平) 400–405	Younger brother of Murong Chui of Later Yan, declared himself Prince in 398 and then Emperor in 400	336–405 (aged 69) Captured and killed by Western Qin
Murong Chao 慕容超	–	405–410 (4–5 years) Era(s): Taishang (太上) 405–410	Uncertain succession	385–410 (aged 25) Captured and killed by Eastern Jin

Western Liang (西涼; 400–421)
Personal name	Posthumous name	Reign	Succession	Life details
Li Gao 李暠	Prince Wuzhao 武昭王	400–417 (16–17 years) Era(s): Gengzi (庚子) 400–405; Jianchu (建初) 406–417	Governor of Dunhuang under Duan Ye of Northern Liang, declared himself Duke	351–417 (aged 66) Died of natural causes
Li Xin 李歆	–	417–420 (2–3 years) Era(s): Jiaxing (嘉興) 417–420	Son of Li Gao	Killed by Juqu Mengxun of Northern Liang
Li Xun 李恂	–	420–421 (0–1 years) Era(s): Yongjian (永建): 420–421	Son of Li Gao	Committed suicide after the fall of Dunhuang

Helian Xia (胡夏; 407–431)
Personal name	Posthumous name	Reign	Succession	Life details
Helian Bobo 赫連勃勃	Emperor Wulie 武烈皇帝	407–425 (17–18 years) Era(s): Longsheng (龍升) 407–413; Fengxiang (鳳翔) 413–418; Changwu (昌武) 418–419; Zhenxing (真興) 419–425	Subordinate of Yao Xing of Later Qin, declared himself Heavenly King in 407 and then Emperor at Chang'an in 418	381–425 (aged 44) Died of natural causes
Helian Chang 赫連昌	–	425–428 (2–3 years) Era(s): Chengguang (承光) 425–428	Son of Helian Bobo	Executed by Northern Wei in 434
Helian Ding 赫連定	–	428–431 (2–3 years) Era(s): Shengguang (勝光): 428–431	Son of Helian Bobo	Executed by Tuyuhun in 432

Northern Yan (北燕; 407–436)
Personal name	Posthumous name	Reign	Succession	Life details
Gao Yun 高雲	Emperor Huiyi 惠懿皇帝	407–409 (1–2 years) Era(s): Zhengshi (正始) 407–409	Adopted son of Murong Bao or Later Yan, proclaimed Heavenly King by Feng Ba	Killed by his underlings
Feng Ba 馮跋	Emperor Wencheng 文成皇帝	409–430 (20–21 years) Era(s): Taiping (太平) 409–430	Seized power after Yun's death	Died of natural causes
Feng Hong 馮弘	Emperor Zhaocheng 昭成皇帝	430–436 (5–6 years) Era(s): Daxing (大興) 431–436	Younger brother of Feng Ba	Defeated by Northern Wei, later murdered in Goguryeo

=== Northern and Southern Dynasties (420–589) ===
==== Northern Dynasties (420–581) ====
Northern Wei (北魏; 386–535)
Posthumous name	Personal name	Reign	Succession	Life details
Emperor Daowu 道武皇帝	Tuoba Gui 拓跋珪	20 February 386 – 409 Era(s): Dengguo (登國) 386–396; Huangshi (皇始) 396–398; Tianxing (天興) 398–404; Tianci (赤烏)404–409	Leader of the Tuoba, refounded the Dai State as Wei	371–409 (aged 39) Killed by his son Tuoba Shao
Emperor Mingyuan 明元皇帝	Tuoba Si 拓跋嗣	409–423 Era(s): Yongxing (永興) 409–413; Shenrui (神瑞) 414–416; Taichang (泰常) 416–423	Son of Emperor Daowu	392–423 (aged 31) Died of disease
Emperor Taiwu 太武皇帝	Tuoba Tao 拓跋燾	423–452 Era(s): Shiguang (始光) 424–428; Shenjia (神䴥) 428–431; Yanhe (延和) 432–434; Taiyan (太延) 435–440; Taipingzhenjun (太平真君) 440–451; Zhengping (正平) 451–452	Son of Emperor Mingyuan	408–452 (aged 43–44) Conquered Xia, Northern Yan and Liang. Killed by eunuch Zong Ai
Tuoba Yu 拓拔余	Tuoba Yu 拓跋余	452 Era(s): Chengping(承平)	Son of Taiwu. Put on the throne by eunuch Zong Ai	Killed by Zong Ai
Emperor Wencheng 文成皇帝	Tuoba Jun 拓跋濬	452–465 Era(s): Xing'an (興安) 452–454; Xingguang (興光) 454–455; Tai'an (太安) 455–459; Heping (和平) 460–465	Grandson of Taiwu. Ascended to the throne after the murder of Zong.	440–465 (aged 24–25) Died of natural causes
Emperor Xianwen 獻文皇帝	Tuoba Hong 拓跋弘	465–471 Era(s): Tianan (天安) 466–467; Huangxin (皇興) 467–471	Son of Wencheng	454–476 (aged 21–22) Abdicated in favor of his son Yuan Hong, later dying of natural causes
Emperor Xiaowen 孝文皇帝	Tuoba Hong 拓跋宏 Yuan Hong 元宏	471–499 Era(s): Yanxing (延興) 471–476; Chengming (承明) 476; Taihe (太和) 477–499	Son of Xianwen, ruled under the regency of Empress Dowager Feng until 470.	467–499 (aged 31–32) One of the most significant reformers in medieval China. Died of natural causes
Emperor Xuanwu 宣武皇帝	Yuan Ke 元恪	499–515 Era(s): Jingming (景明) 500–503; Zhengshi (正始) 504–508; Yongping (永平) 508–512; Yanchang (延昌) 512–515	Son of Xiaowen	483–515 (aged 31–32) His reign marked the decline of Wei
Emperor Xiaoming 孝明皇帝	Yuan Xu 元詡	515–528 Era(s): Xiping (熙平) 516–518; Shengui (神龜) 518–520; Zhengguang (正光) 520–525; Xiaochang (孝昌) 525–527; Wutai (武泰) 528	Son of Xuanwu	510–528 (aged 17–18) Killed in a power struggle against Empress Dowager Hu
None, known as Youzhu of Northern Wei 北魏幼主	Yuan Zhao 元釗	528	Enthroned by Empress Dowager Hu	526–528 (aged 2) Killed by general Erzhu Rong
Emperor Xiaozhuang 孝莊皇帝	Yuan Ziyou 元子攸	528–530 Era(s): Jianyi (建義) 528; Yongan (永安) 528-530	Enthroned by Erzhu Rong	507–early 531 (aged 24) Killed by general Erzhu Zhao
Yuan Ye 元曄	Yuan Ye 元曄	530–531 Era(s): Jianming (建明) 530–531	Enthroned by the Erzhu Clan in opposition to Xiaozhuang	Executed in 532
Emperor Jiemin 節閔皇帝	Yuan Gong 元恭	531–532 Era(s): Putai (普泰) 531–532	Enthroned by Erzhu Shilong	498–532 (aged 33–34) Deposed and executed by Gao Huan
Yuan Lang 元朗	Yuan Lang 元朗	531–532 Era(s): Zhongxing (中興) 531–532	Enthroned by Gao Huan	513–532 (aged 19–18) Deposed and executed by Gao Huan
Emperor Xiaowu 孝武皇帝	Yuan Xiu 元脩	532–535 Era(s): Taichang (太昌) 532; Yongxing (永興) 532; Yongxi (永熙) 532–534	Enthroned by Gao Huan	510–early 535 (aged 25) Fled to Chang’an, where he was poisoned by Yuwen Tai of Northern Zhou

Eastern Wei (东魏; 534–550)
Posthumous name	Personal name	Reign	Succession	Life details
Emperor Xiaojing 孝靜皇帝	Yuan Shanjian 元善見	534–550 Era(s): Tianping (登國) 534–537; Yuanxiang (皇始) 538–539; Xinghe (天興) 539–542; Wuding (赤烏) 543–550	Enthroned by Gao Huan	524–552 (aged 27–28) Forced to abdicate and later poisoned by Gao Yang

Northern Qi (北齐; 550–577)
Posthumous name	Personal name	Reign	Succession	Life details
Emperor Wenxuan 文宣皇帝	Gao Yang 高洋	550–559 Era(s): Tianbao (天保)	Regent of Eastern Wei, proclaimed himself emperor after deposing Emperor Xiaojing	529–559 (aged 29–30) Supposedly suffered insanity in his late reign. Died of natural causes
Emperor Fei 廢皇帝	Gao Yin 高殷	559–560 Era(s): Qianming (乾明)	Son of Emperor Wenxuan, enthroned by official Yang Yin	545–561 (aged 15–16) Forced to abdicate by his uncles Gao Yan and Gao Zhan, later executed
Emperor Xiaozhao 孝昭皇帝	Gao Yan 高演	560–561 Era(s): Huangjian (登國)	Son of Gao Huan, seized power through a palace coup	535–559 (aged 25–26) Died of natural causes
Emperor Wucheng 武成皇帝	Gao Zhan 高湛	561–565 Era(s): Taining (太寧) 561–562; Heqing (河清) 562–565	Brother of Xiaozhao	537–569 (aged 31–32) Abdicated in favor of his son, later dying of natural causes
Gao Wei 高緯	Gao Wei 高緯	565–577 Era(s): Tiantong (天統) 565–569; Wǔpíng (河清) 570–576; Longhua (隆化) 576	Son of Wucheng, ruled under his father's regency until 569	557–577 (aged 19–20) Abdicated in favor of his son, later killed by Northern Zhou
Gao Heng 高恆	Gao Heng 高恆	577 Era(s): Chengguang (承光)	Son of Gao Wei	557–577 (aged 19–20) Abdicated in favor of his uncle Gao Jie, but was soon killed alongside him

Western Wei (西魏; 535–557)
Posthumous name	Personal name	Reign	Succession	Life details
Emperor Wen 文皇帝	Yuan Baoyu 元寶炬	535–551 Era(s): Datong (大統) 535–551	Grandson of Emperor Xiaowen of Northern Wei	507–551 (aged 43–44) Killed by Yuwen Tai of Northern Zhou
Emperor Fei 廢帝	Yuan Qin 元欽	551–554	Son of Emperor Wen, enthroned by Yuwen Tai	Poisoned to death by Yuwen Tai
Emperor Gong 恭皇帝	Yuan Kuo 元廓	554–556	Son of Emperor Wen, enthroned by Yuwen Tai	537–557 (aged 19–20) Abdicated in favor of Yuwen Jue, Tai's son. Killed shortly after

Northern Zhou (北周; 557–581)
Posthumous name	Personal name	Reign	Succession	Life details
Emperor Xiaomin 孝閔皇帝	Yuwen Jue 宇文覺	557	Son of Yuwen Tai, proclaimed himself Heavenly King under Yuwen Hu's patronage and refounded the Northern Wei State as Zhou	542–557 (aged 14–15) Poisoned to death after a failed coup against Yuwen Hu
Emperor Ming 明皇帝	Yuwen Yu 宇文毓	557–560 Era(s): Wucheng (武成) 559–560	Son of Yuwen Tai, ruled alongside Yuwen Hu	534–560 (aged 25–26) Poisoned to death by Yuwen Hu
Emperor Wu 武皇帝	Yuwen Yong 宇文邕	561–578 Era(s): Baoding (保定) 561–565; Tianhe (河清) 565–572; Jiande (隆化) 572–578; Xuanzheng (隆化) 578	Son of Yuwen Tai, sole ruler after deposing Yuwen Hu in 572	543–578 (aged 34–35) Died of natural causes
Emperor Xuan 宣皇帝	Yuwen Yun 宇文贇	578–579 Era(s): Dacheng (大成) 579	Son of Yuwen Yong	559–580 (aged 34–35) He neglected government and abdicated in favor of his son
Emperor Jing 靜皇帝	Yuwen Yan 宇文衍 Yuwen Chan 宇文闡	579–581 Era(s): Daxiang (大象) 579–581; Dading (大定) 581	Son of Yuwen Yun	573–581 (aged 7–8) Killed by officer Yang Jian, the future Emperor Wen of Sui

==== Southern Dynasties (420–589) ====
Liu Song dynasty (劉宋, 420–479)
Posthumous name	Personal name	Reign	Succession	Life details
Emperor Wu 武皇帝	Liu Yu 劉裕	420–422 (1–2 years) Era(s): Yongchu (永初)	Proclaimed himself emperor after defeating Huan Xuan of Jin in 404, conquering Southern Yan in 410 and taking Later Qin in 417.	363–422 (aged 58–59) Died of natural causes
Emperor Shao 少帝	Liu Yifu 劉義符	422–424 (1–2 years) Era(s): Jingping (景平) 423–424	Son of Emperor Wu	406–424 (aged 17–18) Killed by officer Xu Xianzhi
Emperor Wen 文皇帝	Liu Yilong 劉義隆	424–453 (28–29 years) Era(s): Yuanjia (元嘉) 424–453	Son of Emperor Wu	407–453 (aged 45–46) Killed by his son
Liu Shao 劉劭	Liu Shao 劉劭	453 (less than a year) Era(s): Taichu (太初) 453	Son of Emperor Wen	c. 426–453 (aged c. 27) Killed by his brother
Emperor Xiaowu 孝武皇帝	Liu Jun 劉駿	453–464 (10–11 years) Era(s): Xiaojian (孝建) 454–456; Daming (大明) 457–464	Son of Emperor Wen	430–464 (aged 13–14) Died of natural causes
Emperor Qianfei 前廢帝	Liu Ziye 劉子業	464–465 (0–1 years) Era(s): Yongguang (永光) 456; Jinghe (景和) 456	Son of Emperor Xiaowu	449–465 (aged 15–16) Killed in a conspiracy
Emperor Ming 明皇帝	Liu Yu 劉彧	466–472 (5–6 years) Era(s): Taishi (泰始) 465–471; Taiyu (泰豫) 472	Son of Emperor Wen	439–472 (aged 32) Died of natural causes
Emperor Houfei 後廢帝	Liu Yu 劉昱	472–477 (4–5 years) Era(s): Yuanhui (元徽) 473–477	Son of Emperor Ming	463–477 (aged 13–14) Killed by Xiao Daocheng
Emperor Shun 順皇帝	Liu Zhun 劉準	477–479 (1–2 years) Era(s): Shengming (昇明)	Son of Emperor Ming, enthroned by Xiao Daocheng, the future Emperor Gao of Southern Qi	467–479 (aged 13–14) Killed by Xiao Daocheng

Southern Qi (南齊; 479–502)
Posthumous name	Personal name	Reign	Succession	Life details
Emperor Gao 高皇帝	Xiao Daocheng 蕭道成	479–482 (2–3 years) Era(s): Jianyuan (建元) 479–482	Proclaimed himself emperor after overthrowing the Liu Song dynasty	427–482 (aged 54–55) Died of natural causes
Emperor Wu 武皇帝	Xiao Ze 蕭賾	482–493 (10–11 years) Era(s): Jianyuan (建元) 483–493	Son of Emperor Gao	440–493 (aged 54–55) Died of natural causes
Prince of Yulin 鬱林王	Xiao Zhaoye 蕭昭業	493–494 (0–1 years) Era(s): Jianyuan (隆昌) 494	Grandson of Emperor Wu	473–494 (aged 20–21) Killed by Xiao Luan
Xiao Zhaowen 蕭昭文	Xiao Zhaowen 蕭昭文	494 (less than a year) Era(s): Yanxing (延興) 494	Younger brother of Xiao Zhaoye	480–494 (aged 13–14) Killed by Xiao Luan
Emperor Ming 明皇帝	Xiao Luan 蕭鸞	494–498 (3–4 years) Era(s): Jianwu (建武) 494–498; Tongtai (永泰) 498	Nephew of Emperor Gao	452–498 (aged 45–46) Died of natural causes
Marquess of Donghun 東昏侯	Xiao Baojuan 蕭寶卷	498–501 (2–3 years) Era(s): Yongyuan (永元) 499–501	Son of Xiao Luan	483–501 (aged 17–18) Killed by his underlings
Emperor He 和皇帝	Xiao Baorong 蕭寶融	501–502 (0–1 years) Era(s): Zhongxing (中興) 501–502	Son of Xiao Luan, set up in Jiangling in opposition to his brother	488–502 (aged 13–14) Deposed and killed by Xiao Yan

Liang dynasty (梁; 502–557)
Posthumous name	Personal name	Reign	Succession	Life details
Emperor Wu 武皇帝	Xiao Yan 蕭衍	502–549 (46–47 years) Era(s): Tianjian (天監) 502–519; Putong (普通) 520–527; Datong (大通) 527–529; Zhongdatong (中大通) 529–534; Datong (大同) 535–546; Zhongdatong (中大同) 546–547; Taiqing (太清) 547–549	Overthrew the Southern Qi	464–549 (aged 85) Imprisoned during the rebellion of Hou Jing, died of hunger
Emperor Jianwen 簡文皇帝	Xiao Gang 蕭綱	549–551 (1–2 years) Era(s): Dabao (大寶) 550–551	Son of Emperor Wu, enthroned by Hou Jing	503–551 (aged 47–48) Deposed and killed by Hou Jing
None, known by his personal name	Xiao Dong 蕭棟	551 (less than a year) Era(s): Tianzheng (天正) 551	Grandson of Xiao Tong and great-grandson of Emperor Wu, enthroned by Hou Jing	503–551 (aged 47–48) Deposed by Hou Jing and killed by Xiao Yi
Emperor Yuan 元皇帝	Xiao Yi 蕭繹	552–555 (2–3 years) Era(s): Chengsheng (承聖) 552–555	Son of Wu. Sole ruler after defeating Hou Jing in 552 and Xiao Ji in 553.	508–555 (aged 46–47) Captured and killed by Western Wei
Emperor Min 閔皇帝	Xiao Yuanming 蕭淵明	555 (less than a year) Era(s): Tiancheng (天成) 555	Nephew of Wu, enthroned by official Wang Sengbian	Deposed by Chen Baxian, died of natural causes in 556
Emperor Jin 敬皇帝	Xiao Fangzhi 蕭方智	555–557 (1–2 years) Era(s): Shaotai (紹泰) 555–556; Taiping (太平) 556–557	Son of Yuan, enthroned by Chen Baxian	543–558 (aged 14–15) Deposed and killed by Chen Baxian

Western Liang (西梁; 555–587)
Posthumous name	Personal name	Reign	Succession	Life details
Emperor Xuan 宣皇帝	Xiao Cha 蕭詧	555–562 (6–7 years) Era(s): Dading (大定) 555–562	Son of Xiao Tong and grandson of Emperor Wu, enthroned by Western Wei	519–562 (aged 42–43) Died of natural causes
Emperor Ming 明皇帝	Xiao Kui 蕭巋	562–585 (22–23 years) Era(s): Tianbao (天保) 562–585	Son of Xiao Cha	542–585 (aged 42–43) Died of natural causes
Emperor Jing 靖皇帝	Xiao Cong 蕭琮	585–587 (1–2 years) Era(s): Guangyun (廣運) 586–587	Son of Xiao Kui	Deposed by Emperor Wen of Sui in 587, died of natural causes c. 607

Chen dynasty(陳; 557–589)
Posthumous name	Personal name	Reign	Succession	Life details
Emperor Wu 武皇帝	Chen Baxian 陳霸先	557–559 (1–2 years) Era(s): Yongding (永定) 557–559	Overthrew the Liang Dynasty	503–559 (aged 55–56) Died of natural causes
Emperor Wen 文皇帝	Chen Qian 陳蒨	559–566 (6–7 years) Era(s): Tianjia (永定) 560–566; Tiankang (天康) 566	Nephew of Chen Baxian	522–566 (aged 43–44) Died of natural causes
Emperor Fei 廢帝	Chen Bozong 陳伯宗	566–568 (1–2 years) Era(s): Guangda (光大) 555–568	Son of Emperor Wen	554–570 (aged 15–16) Deposed by his uncle
Emperor Xuan 宣皇帝	Chen Xu 陳頊	569–582 (12–13 years) Era(s): Taijian (太建) 569–582	Younger brother of Emperor Wen	528–582 (aged 59–60) Died of natural causes
Chen Houzhu 陳後主	Chen Shubao 陳叔寶	582–589 (6–7 years)	Son of Emperor Xuan	553–604 (aged 50–51) Neglect of government, he was captured by the Sui army. Died of natural causes

== Mid-imperial China ==
=== Sui dynasty (581–619) ===
Sui dynasty (隋朝; 581–619)
Portrait	Posthumous name	Personal name	Reign	Succession	Life details
	Wen 文	Yang Jian 楊堅	4 March 581 – 13 August 604 (23 years, 5 months and 9 days) Era(s): Kaihuang (開皇) 4 March 581 – 7 February 601; Renshou (仁壽) 8 February 601 – 13 August 604	Son of Yang Zhong, Duke of Sui. Overthrew the Northern Zhou and conquered the other Chinese states	21 July 541 – 13 August 604 (aged 63) Instituted several institutional reforms and promoted Buddhism. Murdered by his son
	Yang 煬	Yang Guang 楊廣	21 August 604 – 11 April 618 (13 years, 7 months and 21 days) Era(s): Daye (大業) 25 January 605 – 11 April 618	Son of Wen	569 – 11 April 618 (aged 51) Led several construction projects and military campaigns. Overthrown in a rebellion and killed by his underlings
Gong 恭		Yang You 楊侑	18 December 617 – 12 June 618 (Note: Moule 1957, p. 34 gives 30 May 618 as the date for the end of Yang You's reign, but modern sources usually give 12 June.) (5 months and 25 days) Era(s): Yining (義寧) 18 December 617 – 12 June 618	Grandson of Wen	605 – 619 (aged 14) A puppet of Li Yuan. Deposed and later executed

=== Tang and Zhou dynasties (618–907) ===
Tang (唐; 618–690; 705–907) and (Wu) Zhou ((武)周; 690–705) dynasties
Portrait	Temple name	Personal name	Reign	Succession	Life details
==== Early Tang (618–690) ====
	Gaozu 高祖 Other names: Posthumous name (635) Emperor Taiwu (太武皇帝) Posthumous name (674) Emperor Shenyao (神堯皇帝) Posthumous name (754) Emperor Shenyao Dasheng Daguang Xiao (神堯大聖大光孝皇帝)	Li Yuan 李淵	18 June 618 – 4 September 626 (8 years, 2 months and 17 days) Era(s): Wude (武德) 18 June 618 – 22 January 627	Son of Li Bing, Duke of Tang and officer of Northern Zhou. Claimed descent from Li Gao, founder of Western Liang	566 – 25 June 635 (aged 69) Abdicated in favor of his son following the Xuanwu Gate Incident. A fair and capable ruler, his reign is said to have started a golden age in Chinese history, although imperial propaganda often underestimated his reign to exalt that of his son
	Taizong 太宗 Other names: Posthumous name (649): Emperor Wen (文皇帝) Posthumous name (754): Emperor Wen Wu Dasheng Daguang Xiao (文武大聖大廣孝皇帝)	Li Shimin 李世民	4 September 626 – 10 July 649 (23 years, 10 months and 6 days) Era(s): Zhenguan (貞觀) 23 January 627 – 6 February 650	Son of Gaozu; named heir after the murder of Crown Prince Li Jiancheng in the Xuanwu Gate Incident	23 January 597/99 – 10 July 649 (aged 50–52) Considered one of the greatest emperors in Chinese history, both as a conqueror and administrator. His reign saw a territorial expansion and economic growth not seen since the Han dynasty. Died after a period of prolonged illness, possibly due to alchemical elixir poisoning
Gaozong 高宗 Other names: Posthumous name (683): Great Emperor Tianhuang (天皇大皇帝) Posthumous name (754): Emperor Tianhuang Dasheng Dahong Xiao (天皇大聖大弘孝皇帝)		Li Zhi 李治	15 July 649 – 27 December 683 (34 years, 5 months and 12 days) Era(s): Yonghui (永徽) 7 February 650 – 6 February 656; Xianqing (顯慶) 7 February 656 – 3 April 661; Longshuo (龍朔) 4 April 661 – 1 February 664; Linde (麟德) 2 February 664 – 13 February 666; Qianfeng (乾封) 14 February 666 – 21 April 668; Zongzhang (總章) 22 April 668 – 26 March 670; Xianheng (咸亨) 27 March 670 – 19 September 674; Shangyuan (上元) 20 September 674 – 17 December 676; Yifeng (儀鳳) 18 December 676 – 14 July 679; Tiaolu (調露) 15 July 679 – 21 September 680; Yonglong (永隆) 22 September 680 – 14 November 681; Kaiyao (開耀) 15 November 681 – 1 April 682; Yongchun (永淳) 2 April 682 – 26 December 683; Hongdao (弘道) 27 December 683 – 22 January 684	Son of Taizong	20 July 628 – 27 December 683 (aged 55) A well-meaning but ineffectual ruler, his reign was dominated by several successive regencies. Suffered a serious stroke in late 660, whereafter the government was run by his wife, the future Empress Wu Zetian. Died after several years of illness
(non-contemporary)	Zhongzong 中宗 Other names: Posthumous name (710): Emperor Xiaohe (孝和皇帝) Posthumous name (754): Emperor Dahe Dasheng Dazhao Xiao (大和大聖大昭孝皇帝)	Li Xian 李顯	3 January 684 – 26 February 684 (1 month and 23 days) Era(s): Sisheng (嗣聖) 23 January – 26 February 684	Son of Gaozong and Wu Zetian	26 November 656 – 3 July 710 (aged 53) Deposed by his mother after challenging her authority
	Ruizong 睿宗 Other names: Posthumous name (716): Great Emperor Shengzhen (大圣真皇帝) Posthumous name (754): Emperor Xuanzhen Dasheng Daxing Xiao (玄真大聖大興孝皇帝)	Li Dan 李旦	27 February 684 – 16 October 690 (6 years, 7 months and 19 days) Era(s): Wenming (文明) 27 February – 18 October 684; Guangzhai (光宅) 19 October 684 – 8 February 685; Chuigong (垂拱) 9 February 685 – 26 January 689; Yongchang (永昌) 27 January – 17 December 689; Zaichu (載初) 18 December 689 – 15 October 690	Son of Gaozong and Wu Zetian	22 June 662 – 13 July 716 (aged 54) A complete puppet of his mother; forced to abdicate
==== (Wu) Zhou (690–705) ====
	none, known as Wu Zetian 武則天 (Note: Also known as "Wu Hou" (武后). The title Huanghou (皇后) given to consorts it's often translated as "Empress consort" in English. Though often translated as "Emperor" in this context, the title Huangdi, as well as many other Chinese words, has no assigned gender.) Other names: Dynastic name: Emperor Jinlun (金輪皇帝) Posthumous name (706): Emperor Zetian Dasheng (則天大聖皇帝) Posthumous name (710): Empress Dasheng Tian (大聖天后) Posthumous name (716): Empress Zetian (則天皇后) Posthumous name (749): Empress Zetian Shunsheng (則天順聖皇后)	Wu Zhao 武曌	16 October 690 – 21 February 705 (14 years, 4 months and 5 days) Era(s): Tianshou (天授) 16 October 690 – 21 April 692; Ruyi (如意) 22 April – 22 October 692; Changshou (長壽) 23 October 692 – 8 June 694; Yanzai (延載) 9 June 694 – 21 January 695; Zhengsheng (證聖) 22 January – 21 October 695; Tiancewansui (天冊萬歲) 22 October 695 – 19 January 696; Wansuidengfeng (萬歲登封) 20 January – 21 April 696; Wansuitongtian (萬歲通天) 22 April 696 – 28 September 697; Shengong (神功) 29 September – 19 December 697; Shengli (聖曆) 20 December 697 – 26 May 700; Jiushi (久視) 27 May 700 – 14 February 701; Dazu (大足) 15 February – 25 November 701; Chang'an (長安) 26 November 701 – 21 February 705	Former consort of emperors Taizong and Gaozong; regent since November 660, de facto ruler since January 683	623/625 – 16 December 705 (aged 81–83) Only female sovereign in Chinese history. Notable for her contribution to the Imperial examination system and her support for Buddhism, but also for her violent methods of enforcement. Deposed by Zhang Jianzhi; died of natural causes
==== Tang restoration (705–907) ====
(non-contemporary)	Zhongzong (second reign)	Li Xian 李顯	23 February 705 – 3 July 710 (5 years, 4 months and 10 days) Era(s): Shenlong (神龍) 21 February 705 – 4 October 707; Jinglong (景龍) 5 October 707 – 4 July 710	Restored to the throne by Tang loyalists	26 November 656 – 3 July 710 (aged 53) A weak ruler; he died after eating a poisoned cake delivered by his wife, Empress Wei
none, known as Emperor Shang 唐殤帝 (Note: Li Chongmao is often referred by his posthumous name; he's also known as "Emperor Shao" (少皇帝), referencing his brief reign.)		Li Chongmao 李重茂	8 July 710 – 25 July 710 (17 days) Era(s): Tanglong (唐隆) 5 July – 18 August 710	Son of Zhongzong; installed by Empress Wei	698–714 (aged 16) Second shortest-reigning emperor; deposed in a palace coup
(non-contemporary)	Ruizong (second reign)	Li Dan 李旦	25 July 710 – 8 September 712 (2 years, 1 month and 14 days) Era(s): Jingyun (景雲) 19 August 710 – 28 February 712; Taiji (太極) 1 March – 20 June 712; Yanhe (延和) 21 June – 11 September 712	Restored to the throne by detractors of Empress Wei	22 June 662 – 13 July 716 (aged 54) Spent his reign in a constant power struggle with his sister, Princess Taiping. Abdicated in favor of his son to undermine her influence
(non-contemporary)	Xuanzong 玄宗 Other names: Posthumous name (long): Emperor Zhidao Dasheng Daming Xiao (至道大聖大明孝皇帝) Posthumous name (short): Emperor Ming (明皇帝)	Li Longji 李隆基	8 September 712 – 12 August 756 (43 years, 11 months and 4 days) Era(s): Xiantian (先天) 12 September 712 – 21 December 713; Kaiyuan (開元) 22 December 713 – 9 February 742; Tianbao (天寶) 10 February 742 – 11 August 756	Son of Ruizong	8 September 685 – 3 May 762 (aged 76) One of the greatest and longest reigning Chinese emperors. The Tang empire reached its peak during his early reign, but fell of grace at the end as a result of the disastrous An Lushan rebellion. (Note: For the rival short-lived dynasty of An Lushan, see Yan (An–Shi). The rebels ruled most of China for a few months, after capturing both Luoyang and Chang'an, the imperial capitals.) Abdicated in favor of his son
	Suzong 肅宗 Other names: Posthumous name: Emperor Wenming Wude Dasheng Daxuan Xiao (文明武德大聖大宣孝皇帝)	Li Jun 李浚	12 August 756 – 16 May 762 (5 years, 9 months and 4 days) Era(s): Zhide (至德) 12 August 756 – 17 March 758; Qianyuan (乾元) 18 March 758 – 6 June 760; Shangyuan (上元) 7 June 760 – 22 October 761; Yuannian (元年) 23 October 761 – 13 May 762; Baoying (上元) 14 May 762 – 23 August 763	Son of Xuanzong; proclaimed emperor in Lingwu	711 – 16 May 762 (aged 51) Recaptured Chang'an in November 757. During his reign the eunuchs grew increasingly powerful.
	Daizong 代宗 Other names: Posthumous name: Emperor Ruiwen Xiaowu (睿文孝武皇帝)	Li Chu 李俶	18 May 762 – 10 June 779 (17 years and 23 days) Era(s): Guangde (廣德) 24 August 763 – 25 January 765; Yongtai (永泰) 26 January 765 – 17 December 766; Dali (大曆) 18 December 766 – 10 February 780	Son of Suzong; proclaimed emperor in Chang'an	9 January 727 – 10 June 779 (aged 52) Ended the An–Shi Rebellion, but failed to maintain control over the far provinces
	Dezong 德宗 Other names: Posthumous name: Emperor Shenwu Xiaowen (神武孝文皇帝)	Li Kuo 李适	12 June 779 – 25 February 805 (25 years, 8 months and 13 days) Era(s): Jianzhong (建中) 11 February 780 – 26 January 784; Xingyuan (興元) 27 January 784 – 13 February 785; Zhenyuan (貞元) 14 February 785 – 31 August 805	Son of Daizong	27 May 742 – 25 February 805 (aged 62) Notable for his tax reforms, he also attempted to control regional jiedushi, but this backfired and caused a military mutiny in 783
Shunzong 順宗 Other names: Posthumous name: Emperor Zhide Dasheng Da'an Xiao (至德大聖大安孝皇帝)		Li Song 李誦	28 February – 28 August 805 (6 months) Era(s): Yongzhen (永貞) 1 September 805 – 24 January 806	Son of Dezong	February 761 – 11 February 806 (aged 45) Aphasic, weak and ill, he was urged to abdicate by the court eunuchs
(non-contemporary)	Xianzong 憲宗 Other names: Posthumous name: Emperor Zhaowen Zhangwu Dasheng Zhishen Xiao (昭文章武大聖至神孝皇帝)	Li Chun 李純	5 September 805 – 14 February 820 (14 years, 5 months and 9 days) Era(s): Yuanhe (元和) 25 January 806 – 8 February 810	Son of Shunzong	March 778 – 14 February 820 (aged 41) Ended the warlord threat, but ended up becoming a puppet of the eunuchs. A drug addict, he was poisoned to death by eunuch Chen Hongzhi
	Muzong 穆宗 Other names: Posthumous name: Emperor Ruisheng Wenhui Xiao (睿聖文惠孝皇帝)	Li Heng 李恆	20 February 820 – 25 February 824 (4 years and 5 days) Era(s): Changqing (長慶) 9 February 821 – 28 January 825	Son of Xianzong	July 795 – 25 February 824 (aged 28) Suffered a serious stroke in 822 (while playing polo), whereafter the government was run by eunuchs Wang Shoucheng and Li Fengji.
(non-contemporary)	Jingzong 敬宗 Other names: Posthumous name: Emperor Ruiwu Zhaomin Xiao (睿武昭湣孝皇帝)	Li Zhan 李湛	29 February 824 – 9 January 827 (2 years, 10 months and 11 days) Era(s): Baoli (寶曆) 29 January 825 – 13 March 827	Son of Muzong	22 July 809 – 9 January 827 (aged 17) A reckless player of football; he was killed by eunuchs
	Wenzong 文宗 Other names: Posthumous name: Emperor Yuansheng Zhaoxian Xiao (元聖昭獻孝皇帝)	Li Ang 李昂	13 January 827 – 10 February 840 (13 years lacking 3 days) Era(s): Taihe (太和) 14 March 827 – 21 January 836; Kaicheng (開成) 22 January 836 – 3 February 841	Son of Muzong	20 November 809 – 10 February 840 (aged 30) Attempted to eradicate the eunuchs in the Sweet Dew incident (835), but ended up making them stronger. Died of natural causes
(non-contemporary)	Wuzong 武宗 Other names: Posthumous name: Emperor Zhidao Zhaosu Xiao (至道昭肅孝皇帝)	Li Yan 李炎	20 February 840 – 22 April 846 (6 years, 2 months and 2 days) Era(s): Huichang (會昌) 4 February 841 – 5 February 847	Son of Muzong	2 July 814 – 22 April 846 (aged 31) Notable for his persecution of Buddhism. Died of drug overdose
	Xuanzong 宣宗 Other names: Posthumous name: Emperor Yuansheng Zhiming Chengwu Xianwen Ruizhi Zhangren Shencong Yidao Daxiao (元聖至明成武獻文睿智章仁神聰懿道大孝皇帝)	Li Chen 李忱	25 April 846 – 7 September 859 (13 years, 4 months and 13 days) Era(s): Dazhong (大中) 6 February 847 – 16 December 860	Son of Xianzong	27 July 810 – 7 September 859 (aged 49) Arguably the last capable Tang emperor. Notable for his campaigns against the Tibetan Empire. Died of drug overdose
	Yizong 懿宗 Other names: Posthumous name: Emperor Zhaosheng Gonghui Xiao (昭聖恭惠孝皇帝)	Li Cui 李漼	13 September 859 – 15 August 873 (13 years, 11 months and 2 days) Era(s): Xiantong (咸通) 17 December 847 – 16 December 860	Son of Xuanzong	28 December 833 – 15 August 873 (aged 39) A devout Buddhist, but also a cruel and unstable ruler. His reign, which was dominated by eunuchs, saw various revolts that severely weakened imperial power
(non-contemporary)	Xizong 僖宗 Other names: Posthumous name: Emperor Huisheng Gongding Xiao (惠聖恭定孝皇帝)	Li Xuan 李儇	16 August 873 – 20 April 888 (14 years, 8 months and 4 days) Era(s): Qianfu (乾符) 17 December 874 – 13 February 880; Guangming (廣明) 14 February 880 – 8 August 881; Zhonghe (中和) 9 August 881 – 1 April 885; Guangqi (光啟) 2 April 885 – 4 April 888; Wende (文德) 5 April 888 – 3 February 889	Son of Yizong	8 June 862 – 20 April 888 (aged 25) A puppet of Tian Lingzi, had to flee Chang'an twice due to internal strife
None, known by his personal name		Li Yun 李熅	31 October 886 – January 887 (3 months) Era(s): Jianzhen (建貞) 7 June 886 – January 887	Great-grandson of Suzong, took power in Chang'an	Died in 887 Killed by Xizong's forces; often seen as an usurper
	Zhaozong 昭宗 Other names: Posthumous name: Emperor Shèngmù Jǐngwén Xìao (聖穆景文孝皇帝)	Li Ye 李曄	20 April 888 – 22 September 904 (12 years, 7 months and 11 days) (Note: Emperor Zhaozong was briefly deposed in December 900 by eunuch Liu Jishu, but he regained the throne just a month later.) Era(s): Longji (龍紀) 4 February 889 – 24 January 890; Dashun (大順) 25 January 890 – 1 February 891; Jingfu (景福) 2 February 892 – 9 February 894; Qianning (乾寧) 10 February 894 – 15 September 898; Guanghua (光化) 16 September 898 – 12 May 901; Tianfu (天復) 13 May 901 – 27 May 904; Tianyou (天佑) 28 May 904 – 1 June 907	Son of Yizong	31 March 867 – 22 September 904 (aged 37) His reign saw the final collapse of imperial authority and the rise of new powerful warlords. He was killed by rebel Zhu Wen
better known as Emperor Ai 唐哀帝 Other names: Temple name: Jǐngzōng (景宗) Alternate posthumous name: Emperor Zhaoxuan (昭宣帝)		Li Zhu 李柷	26 September 904 – 1 June 907 (2 years, 8 months and 6 days) (Note: Moule 1957, p. 62 gives 1 June 907 as the date for the end of Emperor Ai's reign, but Kroll 2019, p. 1 gives 5 June. Other sources give 12 May.)	Son of Zhaozong, proclaimed emperor in Luoyang	27 October 892 – 25 March 908 (aged 15) Installed, deposed, and later killed by Zhu Wen

=== Five Dynasties and Ten Kingdoms ===
==== Five Dynasties (907–912) ====
Later Liang (後梁; 907–923)
Personal name	Temple name	Reign	Succession	Life details
Zhu Wen 朱溫	Taizu 太祖	907–912 (4–5 years) Eras: Kaiping (開平) 907–911; Qianhua (乾化) 911–912	Former ally of rebel Huang Chao, defected to the Imperial army in 882 but later betrayed the Tang and proclaimed himself Emperor in Kaifeng	852–912 (aged 60) Killed by his son
Zhu Yougui 朱友珪	—	912–913 (0–1 years) Eras: Fengli (鳳曆) 913	Son of Zhu Wen, usurped power after learning of his father's intentions of adopting Zhu Youwen as heir	Died in 913 Described as murderous and lustful, he was killed by his brother
Zhu Youzhen 朱瑱	—	913–923 (9–10 years) Eras: Qianhua (乾化) 913–915; Zhenming (貞明) 915–921; Longde (龍德) 921–923	Son of Zhu Wen	888–923 (aged 35) Killed by the forces of Li Cunxu

Later Tang (後唐; 923–937)
Personal name	Temple name	Reign	Succession	Life details
Li Cunxu 李存勗	Zhuangzong 莊宗	923–926 (2–3 years) Eras: Tongguang (同光) 923–926	Proclaimed himself Emperor after conquering Later Liang	885–926 (aged 41) Killed in a coup
Li Siyuan 李嗣源	Mingzong 明宗	926–933 (6–7 years) Eras: Tiancheng (天成) 926–933	Adopted son of Li Keyong, took Luoyang and proclaimed himself Emperor after the murder of Li Cunxu	867–933 (aged 66) Died of natural causes
Li Conghou 李從厚	—	934 (less than a year) Eras: Yingshun (应顺) 934	Son of Li Siyuan	914–early 934 (aged 20) Killed by Li Congke
Li Congke 李從珂	—	934–937 (2–3 years) Eras: Qingtai (清泰) 934–937	Adopted son of Li Siyuan, he usurped power from Li Conghou	884/6–936 (aged 50–52) Defeated by Shi Jingtang of Later Jin, he burned himself to death

Later Jin (後晉; 936–947)
Personal name	Temple name	Reign	Succession	Life details
Shi Jingtang 石敬瑭	Gaozu 高祖	936–942 (5–6 years) Eras: Tianfu (天福) 936–942	Proclaimed himself emperor with the help of the Shatuo and Khitan people	892–942 (aged 50) Died of natural causes
Shi Chonggui 石重貴	—	942–947 (4–5 years) Eras: Tianfu (天福) 942–944; Kaiyun (開運) 944–946	Nephew of Shi Jingtang	914–947 (aged 33) Captured by Emperor Taizong of Liao but spared; died of natural causes

Later Han (後漢; 947–951)
Personal name	Temple name	Reign	Succession	Life details
Liu Zhiyuan 劉知遠	Gaozu 高祖	947–948 (0–1 years) Eras: Tianfu (天福) 947; Qianyou (乾祐) 948	Jiedushi under the Later Jin, proclaimed himself emperor after the capture of Shi Chonggui by the Khitan	895–948 (aged 53) Died of natural causes
Liu Chengyou 劉承祐	—	948–951 (2–3 years) Eras: Qianyou (乾祐) 947–951	Son of Liu Zhiyuan	931–951 (aged 20) Killed by the forces of Guo Wei

Later Zhou (後周; 951–960)
Personal name	Temple name	Reign	Succession	Life details
Guo Wei 郭威	Taizu 太祖	951–954 (2–3 years) Eras: Guangshun (廣順) 951–953; Xiande (顯德) 954	Officer of Later Han, proclaimed himself emperor and dethroned Liu Chengyou	904–954 (aged 50) Died of natural causes; introduced reforms that greatly benefited farming
Chai Rong 柴榮	Shizong 世宗	954–959 (4–5 years) Eras: Xiande (顯德) 954–959	Adopted son of Guo Wei	921–959 (aged 38) Conquered Eastern and Southwest China; died of natural causes
Chai Zongxun 柴宗訓	—	959–960 (0–1 years) Eras: Xiande (顯德) 959–960	Son of Chai Rong	953–973 (aged 20) Deposed by Emperor Taizu of Song

==== Ten Kingdoms (907–979) ====
Former Shu (前蜀; 907–925)
Personal name	Temple name	Reign	Succession	Life details
Wang Jian 王建	Gaozu 高祖	907–918 (10–11 years)	Rebelled against the Tang in 891, named Prince in 903 and later proclaimed himself emperor in 907	847–918 (aged 69) Died of natural causes; known for his great tomb and stone statues
Wang Zongyan 王宗衍	—	918–925 (6–7 years)	Son of Wang Jian	899–926 (aged 27) Lustful and neglected of government, he was killed by Li Cunxu

Yang Wu (楊吳; 907–937)
Personal name	Temple name	Reign	Succession	Life details
Yang Xingmi 楊行密	Taizu 太祖	902–905 (2–3 years)	Took over Yangzhou in 892 and was named "Prince of Wu" in 902, became independent after the fall of the Tang	852–905 (aged 53) Died of natural causes
Yang Wo 楊渥	—	905–908 (2–3 years)	Son of Yang Xingmi	886–908 (aged 22) Killed by Zhang Hao and Xu Wen
Yang Longyan 楊隆演	—	908–920 (11–12 years)	Son of Yang Xingmi, enthroned by Xu Wen	897–920 (aged 23) Died of natural causes
Yang Pu 楊溥	—	920–937 (16–17 years)	Son of Yang Xingmi and enthroned by Xu Zhigao (Li Bian), declared himself Emperor in 927	901–938 (aged 37) Forced to abdicate to Li Bian of Southern Tang; died of natural causes

Ma Chu (馬楚; 907–951)
Personal name	Posthumous name	Reign	Succession	Life details
Ma Yin 馬殷	Prince Wumu 武穆王	907–930 (22–23 years)	A carpenter who rose from the ranks to become prefect of Tanzhou in 896, he was named Prince in 927 by Li Siyuan	852–930 (aged 78) Died of natural causes
Ma Xisheng 馬希聲	Prince of Hengyang 衡陽王	930–932 (1–2 years)	Son of Ma Yin	899–932 (aged 33) An admirer of Zhu Wen, he cooked 50 chickens a day; died of natural causes
Ma Xifan 馬希範	Prince Wenzhao 文昭王	932–947 (14–15 years)	Son of Ma Yin, didn't assume his title until later in his reign	899–947 (aged 48) Known for his extravagance and his building projects; died of natural causes
Ma Xiguang 馬希廣	—	947–951 (3–4 years)	Son of Ma Yin	Died in 951 Deposed and later killed by his brother
Ma Xi'e 馬希萼	—	951 (less than a year)	Son of Ma Yin	Deposed by his brother, fate unknown
Ma Xichong 馬希崇	—	951 (less than a year)	Son of Ma Yin	Deposed by the Southern Tang with the help of Xi’e's supporters, fate unknown

Wuyue (吳越; 907–978)
Personal name	Posthumous name	Reign	Succession	Life details
Qian Liu 錢鏐	Prince Wusu 武肅王	907–932 (24–25 years)	Named "Prince of Wuyue" by Later Liang	852–932 (aged 80) Died of natural causes
Qian Yuanguan 錢元瓘	Prince Wensu 文肅王	932–941 (8–9 years)	Son of Qian Liu	887–941 (aged 54) Died of natural causes
Qian Hongzuo 錢弘佐	Prince Zhongxian 忠獻王	941–947 (5–6 years)	Son of Qian Yuanguan	928–947 (aged 69) Died of natural causes
Qian Hongzong 錢弘倧	Prince Zhongxun 忠遜王	947–early 948 (0–1 years)	Son of Qian Yuanguan	c. 929–c. 971 (aged approx. 42) Deposed by general Hu Jinsi, fate unknown
Qian Chu 錢俶	Prince Zhongyi 忠懿王	978 (less than a year)	Son of Qian Yuanguan	929–988 (aged 59) Surrendered to the Song dynasty, died of sudden illness or poisoning

Min (閩; 909–944) & Yin (殷; 943–945)
Personal name	Temple name	Reign	Succession	Life details
Wang Shenzhi 王審知	Taizu 太祖	909–925 (15–16 years)	Younger brother of warlord Wang Chao, named wang of Min by Later Liang	862–925 (aged 63) One of the most peaceful reign periods of the period; died of natural causes
Wang Yanhan 王延翰	—	926–927 (0–1 years)	Son of Wang Shenzhi	Died in 927 Killed by his brother
Wang Yanjun 王延鈞	Huizong 惠宗	927–935 (7–8 years)	Son of Wang Shenzhi, proclaimed Prince in 928 and later Emperor in 933	Died in 935 Killed by his son
Wang Jipeng 王繼鵬 Wang Chang 王昶	Kangzong 康宗	935–939 (3–4 years)	Son of Wang Yanjun	Died in 939 A devout Taoist, he was killed in a coup
Wang Yanxi 王延羲	Jingzong 景宗	939–944 (4–5 years)	Son of Wang Shenzhi	Died in 944 A despotic ruler, he was killed by Lian Chongyu and his associates
Wang Yanzheng 王延政	Gongyi 恭懿王	945 (less than a year)	Proclaimed himself "Prince of Yin" to rival his brother Wang Yanxi	Died in 945 Defeated by Southern Tang, died of natural causes in captivity

Great Yue (大越; 917–918) Southern Han (南漢; 918–971)
Personal name	Temple name	Reign	Succession	Life details
Liu Yan 劉巖	Gaozu 高祖	917–942 (24–25 years)	Took over of Guangzhou in 911, proclaimed himself Emperor of Yue (renamed "Han" in 918)	889–942 (aged 63) A despotic and extravagant ruler; died of natural causes
Liu Bin 劉玢	—	942–943 (0–1 years)	Son of Liu Yan	920–943 (aged 63) An hedonistic ruler; he was killed by his brother
Liu Sheng 劉晟	Zhongzong 中宗	943–958 (14–15 years)	Son of Liu Yan	920–958 (aged 38) Died of natural causes
Liu Chang 劉鋹	—	958–971 (12–13 years)	Son of Liu Sheng	943–980 (aged 37) Another hedonistic ruler, he surrendered to the Song army and was spared

Jingnan (荊南; 924–963)
Personal Name	Temple name	Reign	Succession	Life details
Gao Jixing 高季興	—	924–early 929 (4–5 years)	Named King of Nanping by Later Tang in 924, ruled under the vassalage of Wu	858–929 (aged 71) Died of natural causes
Gao Conghui 高從誨	—	929–948 (18–19 years)	Son of Gao Jixing	891–948 (aged 57) A weak ruler, he was nicknamed "Gao the Jerk" (高賴子); died of natural causes
Gao Baorong 高寶融	—	948–960 (11–12 years)	Son of Gao Conghui	920–960 (aged 40) Died of natural causes
Gao Baoxu 高寶勗	—	960–962 (1–2 years)	Son of Gao Conghui, effective ruler during the reign of his brother	924–962 (aged 38) Died of natural causes
Gao Jichong 高繼沖	—	962–963 (0–1 years)	Son of Gao Baorong	943–973 (aged 30) Surrendered to the Song but spared

Later Shu (後蜀; 934–965)
Personal Name	Temple name	Reign	Succession	Life details
Meng Zhixiang 孟知祥	Gaozu 高祖	934 (less than a year)	Later Tang governor from 926, proclaimed King in 933 and later Emperor in 93	874–934 (aged 60) Died of natural causes
Meng Chang 孟昶	—	934–965 (30–31 years)	Son of Meng Zhixiang	919–965 (aged 60) Defeated by the Song dynasty, died of natural causes

Southern Tang (南唐; 937–976)
Personal Name	Temple name	Reign	Succession	Life details
Li Bian 李昪	Liezu 烈祖	937–943 (5–6 years)	Adopted son of Xu Wen, proclaimed himself Emperor after overthrowing the Yang Wu	888–943 (aged 55) Died of natural causes
Li Jing 李璟	Yuanzong 元宗	943–961 (17–18 years)	Son of Li Bian	888–943 (aged 55) Conquered Min and Chu, but failed to ward the attacks of Later Zhou. A distinguished poet, he died of natural causes
Li Yu 李煜	—	961–976 (14–15 years)	Son of Li Jing	937–978 (aged 41) A master of the ci poetry, he surrendered to the Song dynasty but was spared

Northern Han (北漢; 951–979)
Personal Name	Temple name	Reign	Succession	Life details
Liu Chong 劉崇	Shizu 世祖	951–954 (2–3 years)	Cousin of Liu Zhiyuan of Later Tang, proclaimed himself Emperor	895–954 (aged 59) Died of natural causes
Liu Jun 劉鈞	Ruizong 睿宗	954–968 (13–14 years)	Son of Liu Chong	926–968 (aged 42) Died of natural causes
Liu Ji'en 劉繼恩	–	968 (less than a year)	Adopted son of Liu Jun	935–968 (aged 33) Killed by Hou Barong
Liu Jiyuan 劉繼元	Yingwu 英武	968–979 (10–11 years)	Adopted son of Liu Jun	956–991 (aged 35) Surrendered to the Song and spared

== Late imperial China ==
=== Song dynasty (960–1279) ===
Song dynasty (宋朝; 960–1279)
Portrait	Temple name	Personal name	Reign	Succession	Life details
==== Northern Song (960–1127) ====
	Taizu 太祖 Other names: Posthumous name: Emperor Qiyun Liji Yingwu Ruiwen Shende Shenggong Zhiming Daxiao (啓運立極英武睿文神德聖功至明大孝皇帝)	Zhao Kuangyin 趙匡胤	4 February 960 – 14 November 976 (16 years, 9 months and 10 days) Era(s): Jianlong (建隆) 4 February 960 – 3 December 963; Qiande (乾德) 4 December 963 – 15 December 968; Kaibao (開寶) 16 December 968 – 13 January 977	Proclaimed emperor after deposing Chai Zongxun of Later Zhou. Unified most of China under his rule	21 March 927 – 14 November 976 (aged 49) Significantly reduced the power of the military in favor of civilian officers. Died in uncertain circumstances, probably illness
	Taizong 太宗 Other names: Posthumous name: Emperor Zhiren Yingdao Shengong Shengde Wenwu Ruilie Daming Guangxiao (至仁應道神功聖德文武睿烈大明廣孝皇帝)	Zhao Jiong 趙炅	14 November 976 – 8 May 997 (20 years, 5 months and 24 days) Era(s): Taiping Xingguo (太平興國) 14 January 977 – 5 December 984; Yongxi (雍熙) 6 December 984 – 7 February 988; Duangong (雍熙) 8 February 988 – 29 January 990; Chunhua (淳化) 30 January 990 – 2 February 995; Zhidao (至道) 3 February 995 – 30 January 998	Younger brother of Taizu	20 November 939 – 8 May 997 (aged 57) Conquered the last remaining Chinese state in 978, but failed the reconquer former Tang territories, like Vietnam. Died of natural causes
	Zhenzong 真宗 Other names: Posthumous name: Emperor Yingfu Jigu Shengong Rangde Wenming Wuding Zhangsheng Yuanxiao (膺符稽古神功讓德文明武定章聖元孝皇帝)	Zhao Heng 趙恆	8 May 997 – 23 March 1022 (24 years, 10 months and 15 days) Era(s): Xianping (咸平) 31 January 998 – 24 January 1004; Jingde (景德) 25 January 1004 – 9 February 1008; Dazhongxiangfu (大中祥符) 10 February 1008 – 30 January 1017; Tianxi (天禧) 31 January 1017 – 3 February 1022; Qianxing (乾興) 4 February 1022 – 24 January 1023	Son of Taizong	23 December 968 – 23 March 1022 (aged 53) Suffered significant defeats to the northern Liao dynasty, leading to the Chanyuan Treaty. Died after a prolonged period of illness
	Renzong 仁宗 Other names: Posthumous name: Emperor Titian Fadao Jigong Quande Shenwen Shengwu Ruizhe Mingxiao (體天法道極功全德神文聖武睿哲明孝皇帝)	Zhao Zhen 趙禎	23 March 1022 – 30 April 1063 (41 years, 1 month and 7 days) Era(s): Tiansheng (天聖) 25 January 1023 – 10 December 1032; Mingdao (明道) 11 December 1032 – 22 January 1034; Jingyou (景祐) 23 January 1034 – 15 December 1038; Baoyuan (寶元) 16 December 1038 – 4 April 1040; Kangding (康定) 5 April 1040 – 15 December 1041; Qingli (慶曆) 16 December 1041 – 4 February 1048; Huangyou (皇祐) 5 February 1049 – 25 April 1054; Zhihe (至和) 26 April 1054 – 22 October 1056; Jiayou (嘉祐) 23 October 1056 – 20 January 1064	Son of Zhenzong	30 May 1010 – 30 April 1063 (aged 52) Ruled under the regency of Empress Liu until 1033. His long reign, the longest of the Song dynasty, saw several developments in culture, philosophy and arts
	Yingzong 英宗 Other names: Posthumous name: Emperor Tiyuan Xiandao Fagu Lixian Dide Wanggong Yingwen Liewu Qinren Shengxiao (體元顯道法古立憲帝德王功英文烈武欽仁聖孝皇帝)	Zhao Shu 趙曙	1 May 1063 – 25 January 1067 (3 years, 8 months and 24 days) Era(s): Zhiping (治平) 21 January 1064 – 5 February 1068	Son of Zhao Yunrang, a grandson of Emperor Taizong, and adopted son of Emperor Renzong	16 February 1032 – 25 January 1067 (aged 34) Ruled initially under the regency of Empress Dowager Cao. Died after several years of illness
	Shenzong 神宗 Other names: Posthumous name: Emperor Xianyuan Jidao Shide Yanggong Qinwen Ruiwu Qisheng Zhaoxiao (憲元繼道世德揚功欽文睿武齊聖昭孝皇帝)	Zhao Xu 趙頊	25 January 1067 – 1 April 1085 (18 years, 2 months and 7 days) Era(s): Xining (熙宁) 6 February 1068 – 22 December 1077; Yuanfeng (元豐) 23 December 1077 – 17 January 1086	Son of Yingzong	25 May 1048 – 1 April 1085 (aged 36) Best known by the implementation of the "New Policies". Died of illness
	Zhezong 哲宗 Other names: Posthumous name: Emperor Tiqian Yingli Longgong Shengde Xianwen Suwu Ruisheng Xuanxiao (體乾應歷隆功盛德憲文肅武睿聖宣孝皇帝)	Zhao Xu 趙煦	1 April 1085 – 23 February 1100 (14 years, 6 months and 25 days) Era(s): Yuanyou (元祐) 18 January 1086 – 28 April 1094; Shaosheng (紹聖) 29 April 1094 – 1 July 1098; Yuanfu (元符) 2 July 1098 – 30 January 1101	Son of Shenzong	4 January 1077 – 23 February 1100 (aged 23) Ruled under the regency of Empress Dowager Gao until 1093. Died of illness
	Huizong 徽宗 Other names: Posthumous name: Emperor Tishen Hedao Junlie Xungong Shengwen Rende Xianci Xianxiao (體神合道駿烈遜功聖文仁德憲慈顯孝皇帝)	Zhao Ji 趙佶	23 February 1100 – 18 January 1126 (25 years, 10 months and 26 days) Era(s): Jianzhongjingguo (建中靖國) 31 January 1101 – 20 January 1102; Chongning (崇寧) 21 January 1102 – 25 January 1107; Daguan (大觀) 26 January 1107 – 9 February 1111; Zhenghe (政和) 10 February 1111 – 14 December 1118; Chonghe (重和) 15 December 1118 – 15 March 1119; Xuanhe (宣和) 16 March 1119 – 24 January 1125	Son of Shenzong	7 June 1082 – 4 June 1135 (aged 52) A remarkable patron of the arts and an artist himself, but a weak ruler and politician. Abdicated during the Jurchen Jin siege of Kaifeng. Captured by the Jin shortly after; died in captivity
	Qinzong 欽宗 Other names: Posthumous name: Emperor Gongwen Shunde Renxiao (恭文順德仁孝皇帝)	Zhao Huan 趙桓	19 January 1126 – 25 March 1127 (1 year, 2 months and 6 days) Era(s): Jingkang (靖康) 25 January 1126 – 11 June 1127	Son of Huizong	23 May 1100 – 14 June 1161 (aged 62) Refused to negotiate with the Jin, which led to a second invasion. Captured alongside his father during the Jingkang incident; died in captivity
==== Southern Song (1127–1279) ====
	Gaozong 高宗 Other names: Posthumous name: Emperor Shouming Zhongxing Quangong Zhide Shengshen Wuwen Zhaoren Xianxiao (受命中興全功至德聖神武文昭仁憲孝皇帝)	Zhao Gou 趙構	12 June 1127 – 24 July 1162 (35 years, 1 month and 12 days) (Note: Emperor Gaozong was briefly deposed between March and April 1129. He was forced to abdicate in favor of his infant son Zhao Fu.) Era(s): Jianyan (建炎) 12 June 1127 – 30 January 1131; Shaoxing (紹興) 31 January 1131 – 22 December 1162	Son of Huizong, proclaimed emperor in Jiankang after fleeing the Jurchen invasion of the North	12 June 1107 – 9 November 1187 (aged 80) A competent ruler that managed to preserve the Song dynasty, but often criticized for his military defeats and political failures. Abdicated in favor of his adopted son, later dying of natural causes
None, known by his personal name		Zhao Fu 趙旉	March – April 1129 (1 month or less) Era(s): Mingshou (明受) 1–22 April 1129	Son of Gaozong, proclaimed emperor during a mutiny	An infant installed by officers Miao Fu and Liu Zhengyan. They lost power within a month
	Xiaozong 孝宗 Other names: Posthumous name: Emperor Shaotong Tongdao Guande Zhaogong Zhewen Shenwu Mingsheng Chengxiao (紹統同道冠德昭功哲文神武明聖成孝皇帝)	Zhao Shen (Note: Born as Zhao Bocong (趙伯琮), later changed to Zhao Wei (趙瑋) in 1160.) 趙眘	24 July 1162 – 18 February 1189 (26 years, 6 months and 25 days) Era(s): Longxing (隆興) 23 December 1162 – 12 February 1165; Qiandao (乾道) 13 February 1165 – 3 February 1174; Chunxi (淳熙) 3 February 1174 – 7 February 1190	Son of Zhao Zicheng, a descendant of the first Song Emperor, and adopted son of Gaozong	27 November 1127 – 28 June 1194 (aged 66) Often regarded as the most peaceful and stable ruler of the Southern Song. Abdicated in favour of his son, later dying of natural causes
	Guangzong 光宗 Other names: Posthumous name: Emperor Xundao Xianren Minggong Maode Wenwen Shunwu Shengzhe Cixiao (循道憲仁明功茂德溫文順武聖哲慈孝皇帝)	Zhao Dun 趙惇	18 February 1189 – 24 July 1194 (5 years, 5 months and 6 days) Era(s): Shaoxi (紹熙) 7 February 1190 – 8 December 1194	Son of Xiaozong	30 September 1147 – 17; September 1200 (aged 53) Forced to abdicate in favor of his son, allegedly because of his mental instability. Died of natural causes
	Ningzong 寧宗 Other names: Posthumous name: Emperor Fatian Beidao Chunde Maogong Renwen Zhewu Shengrui Gongxiao (法天備道純德茂功仁文哲武聖睿恭孝皇帝)	Zhao Kuo 趙擴	24 July 1194 – 17 September 1224 (30 years, 1 month and 24 days) Era(s): Qingyuan (慶元) 11 February 1195 – 1201); Jiatai (嘉泰) 1201–1204); Kaixi (開禧) 1205–1207); Jiading (嘉定) 1207–1224)	Son of Guangzong	19 November 1168 – 17; September 1224 (aged 55) A weak and indecisive ruler who spent most of his life in isolation at the palace. Died of illness
	Lizong 理宗 Other names: Posthumous name: Emperor Jiandao Beide Dagong Fuxing Liewen Renwu Shengming Anxiao (建道備德大功復興烈文仁武聖明安孝皇帝)	Zhao Yun 趙昀	17 September 1224 – 16 November 1264 (40 years, 1 month and 30 days) Era(s): Baoqing (寶慶; 1225–1227); Shaoding (紹定; 1228–1233); Duanping (端平; 1234–1236); Jiaxi (嘉熙; 1237–1240); Chunyou (淳祐; 1241–1252); Baoyou (寶祐; 1253–1258); Kaiqing (開慶; 1259); Jingding (景定; 1260–1264)	Son of Zhao Xilu, a descendant of the first Song Emperor, Taizu	26 January 1205 – 16; November 1264 (aged 59) An emperor devoted to philosophy and the arts, he had to face the first Mongol incursions following the fall of the Jin. Died of illness
	Duzong 度宗 Other names: Posthumous name: Emperor Duanwen Mingwu Jingxiao (端文明武景孝皇帝)	Zhao Qi 趙禥	16 November 1264 – 12 August 1274 (9 years, 8 months and 27 days) Era(s): Xianchun (咸淳) 18 January 1265 – 28 January 1275	Son of Zhao Yurui, a brother of Lizong	2 May 1240 – 12 August 1274 (aged 34) Relegated most imperial duties to his officers. Died of sudden illness
	Gongzong 恭宗 Other names: Posthumous name: Duke Ying (瀛國公, Yíng Guó Gōng)	Zhao Xian 趙㬎	12 August 1274 – 21 February 1276 (1 year, 6 months and 5 days) Era(s): Deyou (德祐) 29 January 1275 – 13 June 1276	Son of Duzong	2 November 1270 – 1323 Ruled under the regency of Empress Xie, who was forced to surrender to the Mongols. Became a monk in Tibet, but was later executed of forced to commit suicide; died in Gansu
	Duanzong 端宗 Other names: Posthumous name: Duke Jian (建國公, Jiàn Guó Gōng)	Zhao Shi 趙昰	14 June 1276 – 8 May 1278 (1 year and 11 months) Era(s): Jingyan (景炎) 14 June 1276 – 22 May 1278	Son of Duzong, proclaimed emperor in Fuzhou after the fall of the capital	1268 – 8 May 1278 (aged 10) Spent most of his life fleeing from the Mongols by sea. Died of illness after barely surviving the sinking of his ship
	None, known by his personal name	Zhao Bing 趙昺	10 May 1278 – 19 March 1279 (10 months and 9 days) Era(s): Xiangxing (祥興) 23 May 1278 – 19 March 1279	Son of Duzong	1271 – 19 March 1279 (aged 8) Thrown into the Xi River during the Battle of Yamen alongside several soldiers and officers as part of a mass suicide

=== Northern regimes (916–1234) ===
==== Liao dynasty (916–1125) ====
Liao dynasty (大遼; 916–1125)
Temple name	Personal name	Reign	Succession	Life details
Taizu 太祖 Other names: Posthumous name (short): Emperor Tian (天皇帝) Posthumous name (long): Emperor Dasheng Daming Shenlie Tian (大聖大明神烈天皇帝) (Note: For Taizu's alternate posthumous names, see Moule 1957, p. 94)	Yelü Abaoji 耶律阿保机	27 February 907 – 6 September 926 (19 years, 6 months and 10 days) Era(s): Shence (神冊) 17 March 916 – 22 March 922; Tianzan (天贊) 23 March 922 – 20 March 926; Tianxian (天顯) 21 March 926 – 6 September 926	Led the Yelü clan as Khagan to unite the Khitan people	872 – 6 September 926 (aged 53–54) Died of natural causes
Taizong 太宗 Other names: Posthumous name: Emperor Xiaowu Huiwen (孝武惠文皇帝) (Note: In 1008, Taizong was originally given the posthumous name Emperor Xiaowu (孝武). This was changed in 1052 to Emperor Xiaowu Huiwen (孝武惠文皇帝).)	Yelü Deguang 耶律德光	11 December 927 – 15 May 947 (19 years, 4 months and 23 days) Era(s): Tianxian (天顯) 927 – 16 December 938; Huitong (會同) 17 December 938 – 23 February 946; Datong (大同) 24 February 947 – 18 May 947 (Note: Some sources differ over the dates for Taizong's Datong era, see Moule 1957, p. 95)	Son of Taizu	902 – 15 May 947 (aged 44–45) Died from a sudden illness
Shizong 世宗 Other names: Posthumous name: Emperor Xiaohe Zhuangxian (孝和莊憲皇帝) (Note: In 952, Shizong was originally given the posthumous name Emperor Xiaohe (孝和) this was changed in 1008 to Emperor Xiaohe Zhuangxian (孝和莊憲皇帝).)	Yelü Ruan 耶律阮	16 May 947 – 7 October 951 (4 years, 4 months and 21 days) Era(s): Tianlu (天祿) 1 November 947 – 7 October 951	Grandson of Taizu	918 – 7 October 951 (aged 32–33) Murdered by his cousin in a coup d'état
Muzong 穆宗 Other names: Posthumous name: Emperor Xiao'an Jingzheng (孝安敬正皇帝)	Yelü Jing 耶律璟	11 October 951 – 12 March 969 (17 years, 5 months and 1 day) Era(s): Yingli (應曆) 11 October 951 – 12 March 969	Son of Taizong	931 – 12 March 969 (aged 37–38) Killed by his personal attendants
Jingzong 景宗 Other names: Posthumous name: Emperor Xiaocheng Kangjing (孝成康靖皇帝) (Note: In 983, Jingzong was originally given the posthumous name Emperor Xiaocheng (孝成) this was changed in 1052 to Emperor Xiaocheng Kangjing (孝成康靖皇帝).)	Yelü Xian 耶律贤	13 May 969 – 13 October 982 (13 years and 5 months) Era(s): Baoning (保寧) 13 March 969 – 16 December 979; Qianheng (乾亨) 17 December 979 – 13 October 982	Son of Shizong	948 – 13 October 982 (aged 33–34) Died of illness on a hunting trip
Shengzong 聖宗 Other names: Posthumous name: Emperor Wenwu Daxiao Xuan (文武大孝宣皇帝)	Yelü Longxu 耶律隆绪	14 October 982 – 25 June 1031 (48 years, 8 months and 11 days) Era(s): Qianheng (乾亨) 982 – 21 July 983; Tonghe (統和) 22 July 983 – 15 December 1012; Kaitai (開泰) 16 December 1012 – 1021; Taiping (太平) 1021 – 25 June 1031	Son of Jingzong	971 – 25 June 1031 (aged 59–60) Longest reigning Liao ruler, though he was controlled by his mother Xiao Yanyan until 1009. Died of natural causes
Xingzong 興宗 Other names: Posthumous name: Emperor Shensheng Xiaozhang (神聖孝章皇帝)	Yelü Zongzhen 耶律宗真	25 June 1031 – 28 August 1055 (24 years, 2 months and 3 days) Era(s): Jingfu (景福) 7 July 1031 – 15 December 1302; Chongxi (重熙) 16 December 1302 – 28 August 1055	Son of Shengzong	1016 – 28 August 1055 (aged 38–39) Died of natural causes
Daozong 道宗 Other names: Posthumous name: Emperor Xiaowen (孝文皇帝)	Yelü Hongji 耶律洪基	28 August 1055 – 12 February 1101 (45 years, 5 months and 15 days) Era(s): Qingning (清寧) 9 September 1055 – 7 February 1065; Xianyong (咸雍) 8 February 1065 – 6 January 1075; Dakang (大康) 7 January 1075 – 1084; Da'an (大安) 1085 – 1094; Shouchang (壽昌) 1095 – 1101	Son of Xingzong	1032 – 12 February 1101 (aged 68–69) Died of natural causes
None, known by his posthumous name: Tianzuo 天祚帝	Yelü Yanxi 耶律延禧	12 February 1101 – 6 September 1125 (24 years, 6 months and 25 days) Era(s): Qiantong (乾統) 2 March 1101 – 25 January 1111; Tianqing (天慶) 26 January 1111 – 1120; Baoda (保大) 1121 – 26 March 1125	Grandson of Daozong	1075 – after 6 September 1125 (aged 49–50) Died in captivity from natural causes

==== Western Xia (1038–1227) ====
Western Xia (西夏; 1038–1227)
Temple name (Note: See Cui & Wen 2007 for further information on the complexities surrounding the names of the Western Xia rulers)	Personal name	Reign	Succession	Life details
Jingzong 景宗 Other names: Posthumous name: Emperor Wulie (武烈皇帝)	Li Yuanhao 李元昊	1038 – 1048 (Note: The death of Jingzong is uncertain and contradictory in many records. He may have died in late 1047 or early 1048.) (9–10 years) Era(s): Tianshoulifayanzuo (天授禮法延祚) 7 February 1038 – 1048	Son of the Tangut leader Li Deming	1003–1048 (aged 44–45) Assassinated by his son, Ningling Ge
Yizong 毅宗 Other names: Posthumous name: Emperor Zhaoying (昭英皇帝)	Li Liangzuo 李諒祚	1048 – January 1068 (19–20 years) Era(s): Yansiningguo (延嗣寧國) 18 January 1048 – 4 February 1049; Tianyouchuisheng (天祐垂聖) 5 February 1049 – 3 February 1052; Fushengchengdao (福聖承道) 4 February 1052 – 19 January 1056; Duodu (奲都) 20 January 1056 – 11 February 1062; Gonghua (拱化) 12 February 1062 – January 1068	Son of Jingzong	1047 – January 1068 (aged 20–21) Infant emperor whose reign was controlled by Lady Mozang and later Mozang Epang. Died of natural causes
Huizong 惠宗 Other names: Posthumous name: Emperor Kangjing (康靖皇帝)	Li Bingchang 李秉常	January 1068 – 21 August 1086 (17–18 years) Era(s): Qiandao (乾道) 18 January 1067 – 25 January 1069; Tiancilishengguoqing (天賜禮盛國慶) 26 January 1069 – 29 January 1074; Da'an (大安) 30 January 1074 – 28 January 1085; Tian'anliding (天安禮定) 29 January 1085 – 21 August 1086	Son of Yizong	1061 – 21 August 1086 (aged 24–25) Struggled with his mother for power throughout his reign. Died of natural causes
Chongzong 崇宗 Other names: Posthumous name: Emperor Shengwen (聖文皇帝)	Li Qianshun 李乾順	11 November 1086 – 1 July 1139 (52–53 years) Era(s): Tianyizhiping (天儀治平) 18 January 1086 – 2 February 1090; Tianyoumin'an (天祐民安) 3 February 1090 – 3 February 1098; Yong'an (永安) 4 February 1098 – 30 January 1101; Zhenguan (貞觀) 31 January 1101 – 7 February 1114; Yongning (雍寧) 8 February 1114 – 11 February 1119; Yuande (元德) 12 February 1119 – 12 February 1127; Zhengde (正德) 13 February 1127 – 15 January 1135; Dade (大德) 16 January 1135 – 1 July 1139	Son of Huizong	1084 – 1 July 1139 (aged 54–55) Died of natural causes
Renzong 仁宗 Other names: Posthumous name: Emperor Shengde (聖德皇帝)	Li Renxiao 李仁孝	July 1139 – 16 October 1193 (53–54 years) Era(s): Daqing (大慶) 22 January 1140 – 17 January 1143; Renqing (人慶) 18 January 1143 – 1 February 1147; Tiansheng (天盛) 2 February 1147 – 10 February 1168; Qianyou (乾祐) 11 February 1168 – 16 October 1193	Son of Chongzong	1124 – 16 October 1193 (aged 68–69) Longest ruling ruler of the dynasty. Died of natural causes
Huanzong 桓宗 Other names: Posthumous name: Emperor Zhaojian (昭簡皇帝)	Li Chunyou 李純佑	1193 – 1 March 1206 (12–13 years) Era(s): Tianqing (天慶) 24 January 1194 – 1 March 1206	Son of Renzong	1177 – 1 March 1206 (aged 28–29) Overthrown in a coup d'état led by Xiangzong. Died of natural causes
Xiangzong 襄宗 Other names: Posthumous name: Emperor Jingmu (敬慕皇帝)	Li Anquan 李安全	March 1206 – 13 September 1211 (4–5 years) Era(s): Yingtian (應天) 30 January 1207 – 26 January 1210; Huangjian (皇建) 27 January 1210 – 13 September 1211	Grandson of Renzong	1170 – 13 September 1211 (aged 40–41) Suffered many losses from the Mongols. Died of natural causes
Shenzong 神宗 Other names: Posthumous name: Emperor Yingwen (英文皇帝)	Li Zunxu 李遵頊	12 August 1211 – 1223 (14–15 years) Era(s): Guangding (光定) 17 January 1211 – 1226	Descendant of Jingzong	1163 – 1226 (aged 62–63) Abdicated amid Mongol invasions. Died of natural causes
Xianzong 獻宗	Li Dewang 李德旺	1223 – August 1226 (2–3 years) Era(s): Qianding (乾定) 2 February 1223 – August 1226	Son of Shenzong	1181 – August 1226 (aged 44–45) Died of natural causes
None, known by his personal name	Li Xian 李晛	1226 – 1227 (1 year or less) Era(s): Baoyi (寶義) 30 January 1226 – 1227	Grandson of Shenzong	? – 1227 (aged ?) Killed by the Mongols

==== Jin dynasty (1115–1234) ====
Jin dynasty (金朝; 1115–1234)
Temple name	Personal name	Reign	Succession	Life details
Taizu 太祖 Other names: Posthumous name (short): Emperor Wuyuan (武元) Posthumous name (long): Emperor Yingqian Xingyun Zhaode Dinggong Renming Zhuangxiao Dasheng Wuyuan (應乾興運昭德定功仁明莊孝大聖武元皇帝)	Wanyan Min 完顏旻	28 January 1115 – 19 September 1123 (8 years, 7 months and 22 days) Era(s): Shouguo (收國) 28 January 1115 – 4 January 1117; Tianfu (天輔) 5 January 1117 – 19 September 1123	Son of Helibo from the Wanyan tribe	1 August 1068 – 19 September 1123 (aged 55) Conquered the Liao dynasty
Taizong 太宗 Other names: Posthumous name (short): Emperor Wenlie (文烈皇帝) Posthumous name (long): Emperor Tiyuan Yingyun Shide Zhaogong Zhehui Rensheng Wenlie (體元應運世德昭功哲惠仁聖文烈皇帝)	Wanyan Sheng 完顏晟	27 September 1123 – 7 February 1135 (11 years, 4 months and 11 days) Era(s): Tianhui (天會) 7 October 1123 – 7 February 1135	Brother of Taizu	1075 – 7 February 1135 (aged 59–60) Sacked the North Song dynasty's capital. Died of natural causes
Xizong 熙宗 Other names: Posthumous name (short): Emperor Xiaocheng (孝成皇帝) Posthumous name (long): Emperor Hongji Zuanwu Zhuangjing Xiaocheng (弘基纘武莊靖孝成皇帝)	Wanyan Dan 完顏亶	8 February 1135 – 9 January 1150 (14 years, 11 months and 1 day) Era(s): Tianhui (天會) 1135 – 6 February 1138; Tianjuan (天眷) 7 February 1138 – 20 February 1141; Huangtong (皇統) 21 February 1141 – 9 January 1150	Grandson of Taizu	1119 – 9 January 1150 (aged 30–31) Assassinated by his chancellor and successor Wanyan Liang
None, informally known as Prince of Hailing 海陵王	Wanyan Liang 完顏亮	9 January 1150 – 15 December 1161 (11 years, 11 months and 6 days) Era(s): Tiande (天德) 11 January 1150 – 20 April 1153; Zhenyuan (貞元) 21 April 1153 – 22 February 1156; Zhenglong (正隆) 23 February 1156 – 15 December 1161	Grandson of Taizu	1122 – 15 December 1161 (aged 38–39) Assassinated by his military commanders after losing the Battle of Caishi
Shizong 世宗 Other names: Posthumous name (short): Emperor Renxiao (仁孝皇帝) Posthumous name (long): Emperor Guangtian Yuyun Wende Wugong Shengming Renxiao (光天興運文德武功聖明仁孝皇帝)	Wanyan Yong 完顏雍	27 October 1161 – 20 January 1189 (27 years, 2 months and 24 days) Era(s): Dading (大定) 28 October 1161 – 20 January 1189	Grandson of Taizu	1123 – 20 January 1189 (aged 65–66) Had the longest and most stable reign of the dynasty
Zhangzong 章宗 Other names: Posthumous name (short): Emperor Yingxiao (英孝皇帝) Posthumous name (long): Emperor Xiantian Guangyun Renwen Yiwu Shensheng Yingxiao (憲天光運仁文義武神聖英孝皇帝)	Wanyan Jing 完顏璟	20 January 1189 – 29 December 1208 (19 years, 11 months and 9 days) Era(s): Mingchang (明昌) 7 February 1190 – 13 December 1196; Cheng'an (承安) 14 December 1196 – 6 January 1201; Taihe (泰和) 7 January 1201 – 29 December 1208	Grandson of Shizong	31 August 1168 – 29 December 1208 (aged 40) Died of natural causes
None, informally known as Prince Shao of Wei 衛紹王	Wanyan Yongji 完顏永濟	29 December 1208 – 11 September 1213 (4 years, 8 months and 13 days) Era(s): Da'an (大安) 5 March 1209 – 4 February 1212; Chongqing (崇慶) 5 February 1212 – ? 1213; Zhining (至寧) ? 1213 – 11 September 1213	Son of Shizong	? – 11 September 1213 (Note: Moule 1957, p. 101 notes that there is uncertainty concerning Wanyan Yongji's death date) (aged ?) Assassinated under the orders of the general Hushahu
Xuanzong 宣宗 Other names: Posthumous name (short): Emperor Shengxiao (聖孝皇帝) Posthumous name (long): Emperor Jitian Xingtong Shudao Qinren Yingwu Shengxiao (繼天興統述道勤仁英武聖孝皇帝)	Wanyan Xun 完顏珣	22 September 1213 – 14 January 1224 (10 years, 3 months and 23 days) Era(s): Zhenyou (貞祐) 30 September 1213 – 8 October 1217; Xingding (興定) 9 October 1217 – 15 September 1222; Yuanguang (元光) 15 September 1222 – 14 January 1224	Grandson of Shizong	1163 – 14 January 1224 (aged 60–61) Suffered heavy losses from the Mongols. Died of natural causes
Aizong 哀宗	Wanyan Shouxu 完顏守緒	15 January 1224 – 8 February 1234 (10 years and 24 days) Era(s): Zhengda (正大) 22 January 1224 – 10 February 1232; Kaixing (開興) 11 February 1232 – 4 May 1232; Tianxing (天興) 5 May 1232 – 8 February 1234	Son of Xuanzong	25 September 1198 – 9 February 1234 (aged 35) Committed suicide amid Mongol invasions
Mo 末	Wanyan Chenglin 完顏承麟	9 February 1234 (less than a day)	Descendant of Helibo	? – 9 February 1234 (aged ?) The shortest reigning Chinese monarch, ruled for less than a day. Died during the Mongol conquest of the Jin

=== Yuan dynasty (1271–1368) ===
Yuan dynasty (大元; 1271–1368)
Portrait	Khan name	Personal name	Reign	Succession	Life details
	Setsen Khan 薛禪汗 better known as Kublai Khan Other names: Temple name: Shizu (世祖) Posthumous name: Emperor Shengde Shengong Wenwu (聖德神功文武皇帝)	Kublai 忽必烈	18 December 1271 – 18 February 1294 (22 years and 2 months) Era(s): Zhongtong (中統) 26 June 1260 – 6 September 1264; Zhiyuan (至元) 7 September 1264 – 18 February 1294	Grandson of Genghis Khan; declared emperor after defeating the Song in the Battle of Yamen	23 September 1215 – 18 February 1294 (aged 78) Fully conquered the Song dynasty, won the Toluid Civil War, moved the capital to Khanbaliq and employed Marco Polo
	Öljeytü Khan 完澤篤汗 Other names: Temple name: Chengzong (成宗) Posthumous name: Emperor Qinming Guangxiao (欽明廣孝皇帝)	Temür 鐵穆耳	10 May 1294 – 10 February 1307 (12 years and 9 months) Era(s): Yuanzhen (元貞) 17 January 1295 – 20 March 1297; Dade (大德) 21 March 1297 – 10 February 1307	Grandson of Kublai	15 October 1265 – 10 February 1307 (aged 41) Died of natural causes
	Külüg Khan 曲律汗 Other names: Temple name: Wuzong (武宗) Posthumous name: Emperor Renhui Xuanxiao (仁惠宣孝皇帝)	Haishan 海山	21 June 1307 – 27 January 1311 (3 years, 7 months and 6 days) Era(s): Zhida (至大) 23 January 1308 – 27 January 1311	Great-grandson of Kublai	4 August 1281 – 27 January 1311 (aged 29) Died of natural causes
	Buyantu Khan 普顏篤汗 Other names: Temple name: Renzong (仁宗) Posthumous name: Emperor Shengwen Qinxiao (聖文欽孝皇帝)	Ayurbarwada 愛育黎拔力八達	7 April 1311 – 1 March 1320 (8 years, 10 months and 23 days) Era(s): Huangqing (皇慶) 7 April 1311 – 6 February 1314; Yanyou (延祐) 7 February 1314 – 1 March 1320	Great-grandson of Kublai	9 April 1285 – 1 March 1320 (aged 34) Died of natural causes
	Gegeen Khan 格堅汗 Other names: Temple name: Yingzong (英宗) Posthumous name: Emperor Ruisheng Wenxiao (睿聖文孝皇帝)	Shidibala 硕德八剌	19 April 1320 – 4 September 1323 (3 years, 4 months and 16 days) Era(s): Zhizhi (至治) 30 December 1320 – 4 September 1323	Son of Ayurbarwada	22 February 1302 – 4 September 1323 (aged 21) Killed in a coup led by Temuder
	None, known either by his personal or era name	Yesün Temür 也孫鐵木兒	4 October 1323 – 15 August 1328 (4 years, 10 months and 11 days) Era(s): Taiding (泰定) 3 January 1324 – 6 May 1328; Zhihe (致和) 7 May 1328 – 15 August 1328	Great-Grandson of Kublai	28 November 1293 – 15 August 1328 (Note: Some uncertainty surrounds his birth and death dates, see Ch'i-Ch'ing 1994, p. 353) (aged 34) Died of natural causes
	None, known either by his personal or era name	Ragibagh 阿剌吉八	October 1328 – 14 November 1328 (1 month) Era(s): Tianshun (天順) October 1328 – 14 November 1328	Son of Yesün	1320 – 14 November 1328 (aged 8) Child emperor; probably murdered amid the War of the Two Capitals
	Jayaatu Khan 札牙篤汗 Other names: Temple name: Wenzong (文宗) Posthumous name: Emperor Shengming Yuanxiao (聖明元孝皇帝)	Tugh Temür 圖帖睦爾	16 October 1328 – 26 February 1329 (4 months and 10 days) Era(s): Tianli (天曆) 16 October 1328 – 26 February 1329	Son of Külüg	16 February 1304 – 2 September 1332 (aged 28) Abdicated in favor of his brother Khutughtu Khan
Khutughtu Khan	Khutughtu Khan 忽都篤汗 Other names: Temple name: Mingzong (明宗) Posthumous name: Emperor Yixian Jingxiao (翼獻景孝皇帝)	Kusala 和世剌	27 February 1329 – 30 August 1329 (6 months and 3 days) Era(s): Tianli (天曆) 27 February 1329 – 30 August 1329	Son of Külüg	22 December 1300 – 30 August 1329 (aged 28) Briefly ruled before killed by El Temür
	Jayaatu Khan 札牙篤汗 (second reign)	Tugh Temür 圖帖睦爾	8 September 1329 – 2 September 1332 (2 years, 11 months and 25 days) Era(s): Zhishun (至順) 25 May 1330 – 2 September 1332	Son of Külüg	16 February 1304 – 2 September 1332 (aged 28) A patron of the arts and scholarship, his reign was dominated by the ministers El Temür and Bayan of the Merkid. Died of natural causes
	None, known by his personal name Other names: Temple name: Ningzong (寧宗) Posthumous name: Emperor Chongsheng Sixiao (沖聖嗣孝皇帝)	Rinchinbal 懿璘質班	23 October 1332 – 14 December 1332 (1 month and 21 days) Era(s): Zhishun (至順) 23 October 1332 – 14 December 1332	Son of Khutughtu	1 May 1326 – 14 December 1332 (aged 6) Child emperor; died of sudden illness
	Ukhaghatu Khan 烏哈噶圖汗 Other names: Temple name: Huizong (惠宗) Posthumous name: Emperor Shun (順皇帝) (Note: Ukhaghatu Khan's posthumous name was given by the Ming court)	Toghon Temür 妥懽帖睦爾	19 July 1333 – 10 September 1368 (35 years, 2 months and 22 days) Era(s): Yuantong (元統) 15 November 1333 – 7 December 1335; Zhiyuan (至元) 8 December 1335 – 17 January 1341; Zhizheng (至正) 18 January 1341 – 10 September 1368	Son of Khutughtu	25 May 1320 – 23 May 1370 (aged 49) Died of natural causes

=== Ming dynasty (1368–1644) ===
Ming dynasty (大明; 1368–1644)
Portrait	Era name	Personal name	Reign (Note: In the Ming dynasty, a few days usually separate each emperor's reign. When a Ming emperor died there was a period of mourning, after which their successor was crowned as soon a "propitious" day was chosen. Emperors reigned in their predecessor's era name until a new era name was declared at the beginning of the next year. Thus, the Hongwu (洪武) era did not technically end with the Hongwu Emperor's death on 24 June 1398, but ended on 5 February 1399 when the subsequent Jianwen Emperor began a new era on 6 February 1399.)	Succession	Life details
	Hongwu 洪武 Other names: Temple name: Taizu (太祖) Posthumous name (short): Emperor Gao (高皇帝) Posthumous name (long): Emperor Kaitian Xingdao Zhaoji Liji Dasheng Zhishen Renwen Yiwu Junde Chenggong Gao (開天行道肇紀立極大聖至神仁文義武俊德成功高皇帝)	Zhu Yuanzhang 朱元璋	23 January 1368 – 24 June 1398 (30 years, 5 months and 1 day) Era(s): Hongwu (洪武) 23 January 1368 – 24 June 1398	Born into poverty, he led the Red Turban Rebellions to establish the Ming dynasty	21 October 1328 – 24 June 1398 (aged 69) Initiated cultural reconstruction and political reform, also noted for his extreme and violent methods of enforcement. Died of natural causes
Jianwen 建文 Other names: Temple name: Huizong (惠宗) (Note: The temple name Huizong was given to the Jianwen Emperor long after his reign by Zhu Yousong, the Prince of Fu, in 1644.) Posthumous name (short): Emperor Hui (惠皇帝) Posthumous name (long): Emperor Gōngmǐn Hui (恭閔惠皇帝) (Note: The posthumous name Emperor Gongmin Hui was given to the Jianwen Emperor long after his reign by the Qianlong Emperor in 1736.)		Zhu Yunwen 朱允炆	30 June 1398 – 13 July 1402 (4 years and 13 days) Era(s): Hongwu (洪武) 30 June 1398 – 5 February 1399; Jianwen (建文) 6 February 1399 – 13 July 1402	Grandson of Hongwu	5 December 1377 – 13 July 1402 (aged 24) Overthrown by the future Yongle Emperor, his uncle. Either died in or disappeared after the fires in the Ming Palace.
	Yongle 永樂 Other names: Temple name: Chengzu (成祖) (Note: Following his death, the Yongle Emperor was given the temple name Taizong (太宗) by his successor the Hongxi Emperor, but this was changed on 3 October 1538 to Chengzu (成祖) by the Jiajing Emperor. The latter has been used since its bestowment) Posthumous name (short): Emperor Wen (文皇帝) Posthumous name (long): Emperor Qitian Hongdao Gaoming Zhaoyun Shengwu Shengong Chunren Zhixiao Wen (啓天弘道高明肇運聖武神功純仁至孝文皇帝)	Zhu Di 朱棣	17 July 1402 – 12 August 1424 (22 years and 26 days) Era(s): Hongwu (洪武) 30 July 1402 – 22 January 1403; Yongle (永樂) 23 January 1403 – 19 January 1425	Son of Hongwu	2 May 1360 – 12 August 1424 (aged 64) Raised the Ming to its highest power. Patron of many projects, including the Porcelain Tower of Nanjing, Yongle Encyclopedia and the Ming treasure voyages. Died of natural causes.
	Hongxi 洪熙 Other names: Temple name: Renzong (仁宗) Posthumous name (short): Emperor Zhao (昭皇帝) Posthumous name (long): Emperor Jingtian Tidao Chuncheng Zhide Hongwen Qinwu Zhangsheng Daxiao Zhao (敬天體道純誠至德弘文欽武章聖達孝昭皇帝)	Zhu Gaochi 朱高熾	7 September 1424 – 29 May 1425 (8 months and 22 days) Era(s): Yongle (永樂) 7 September 1424 – 19 January 1425; Hongxi (洪熙) 20 January 1425 – 7 February 1426	Son of Yongle	16 August 1378 – 29 May 1425 (aged 46) Focused primarily on domestic affairs. Died of natural causes
	Xuande 宣德 Other names: Temple name: Xuanzong (宣宗) Posthumous name (short): Emperor Zhang (章皇帝) Posthumous name (long): Emperor Xiantian Chongdao Yingming Shensheng Qinwen Zhaowu Kuanren Chunxiao Zhang (憲天崇道英明神聖欽文昭武寬仁純孝章皇帝)	Zhu Zhanji 朱瞻基	27 June 1425 – 31 January 1435 (9 years, 7 months and 4 days) Era(s): Hongxi (洪熙) 28 June 1425 – 7 February 1426; Xuande (宣德) 8 February 1426 – 17 January 1436	Son of Hongxi	16 March 1399 – 31 January 1435 (aged 35) A noted painter. Died of natural causes
	known by his temple: Yingzong 英宗 Other names: Temple name: Yingzong (英宗) Posthumous name (short): Emperor Rui (睿皇帝) Posthumous name (long): Emperor Fatian Lidao Renming Chengjing Zhaowen Xianwu Zhide Guangxiao Rui (法天立道仁明誠敬昭文憲武至德廣孝睿皇帝)	Zhu Qizhen 朱祁镇	7 February 1435 – 1 September 1449 (14 years, 6 months and 25 days) (Note: From 1 September 1449 to 20 September 1450, Emperor Yingzong was a captive of the Northern Yuan dynasty during the Tumu Crisis. He was restored to power on 11 February 1457.) Era(s): Xuande (宣德) 7 February 1435 – 17 January 1436; Zhengtong (正統) 18 January 1436 – 13 January 1450	Son of Xuande	29 November 1427 – 23 February 1464 (aged 36) His reign was dominated by eunuchs, particularly Wang Zhen, which led to growing instability. Captured by the Northern Yuan dynasty during the Tumu Crisis.
Jingtai 景泰 Other names: Temple name: Daizong (代宗) Posthumous name (short): Emperor Jing (景皇帝) Posthumous name (long): Emperor Gongren Kangding Jing (恭仁康定景皇帝)		Zhu Qiyu 朱祁鈺	22 September 1449 – 24 February 1457 (7 years, 5 months and 2 days) Era(s): Zhengtong (正統) 18 January 1436 – 13 January 1450; Jingtai (景泰) 14 January 1450 – 11 February 1457	Son of Xuande	11 September 1428 – 14 March 1457 (aged 28) Briefly ruled while his brother was held captive; deposed soon after. Died a month later, possibly from murder.
	Yingzong 英宗 (second reign)	Zhu Qizhen 朱祁镇	11 February 1457 – 23 February 1464 (7 years and 12 days) Era(s): Tianshun (天順) 11 February 1457 – 26 January 1465	Son of Xuande	29 November 1427 – 23 February 1464 (aged 36) Restored to power after his release. Died of natural causes
	Chenghua 成化 Other names: Temple name: Xianzong (憲宗) Posthumous name (short): Emperor Chun (純皇帝) Posthumous name (long): Emperor Jitian Ningdao Chengming Renjing Chongwen Suwu Hongde Shengxiao Chun (繼天凝道誠明仁敬崇文肅武宏德聖孝純皇帝)	Zhu Jianshen 朱見濡	28 February 1464 – 9 September 1487 (23 years, 6 months and 12 days) Era(s): Jingtai (景泰) 28 February 1464 – 26 January 1465; Chenghua (成化) 27 January 1465 – 9 September 1487	Son of Yingzong	9 December 1447 – 9 September 1487 (aged 39) Died of natural causes
	Hongzhi 弘治 Other names: Temple name: Xiaozong (孝宗) Posthumous name (short): Emperor Jing (敬皇帝) Posthumous name (long): Emperor Datian Mingdao Chuncheng Zhongzheng Shengwen Shenwu Zhiren Dade Jing (達天明道純誠中正聖文神武至仁大德敬皇帝)	Zhu Youcheng 朱祐樘	22 September 1487 – 8 June 1505 (17 years, 8 months and 17 days) Era(s): Chenghua (成化) 22 September 1487 – 13 January 1488; Hongzhi (弘治) 14 January 1488 – 23 January 1506	Son of Chenghua	30 July 1470 – 9 June 1505 (aged 34) Died of natural causes
	Zhengde 正德 Other names: Temple name: Wuzong (武宗) Posthumous name (short): Emperor Yi (毅皇帝) Posthumous name (long): Emperor Chengtian Dadao Yingsu Ruizhe Zhaode Xiangong Hongwen Sixiao Yi (承天達道英肅睿哲昭德顯功弘文思孝毅皇帝)	Zhu Houzhao 朱厚㷖	19 June 1505 – 20 April 1521 (15 years, 10 months and 1 day) Era(s): Hongzhi (弘治) 19 June 1505 – 23 January 1506; Zhengde (正德) 24 January 1506 – 20 April 1521	Son of Hongzhi	14 November 1491 – 20 April 1521 (aged 29) His reign saw the rise of influence from eunuchs, particularly Liu Jin. Probably drowned after his boat sank.
	Jiajing 嘉靖 Other names: Temple name: Shizong (世宗) Posthumous name (short): Emperor Su (肅皇帝) Posthumous name (long): Emperor Qintian Lüdao Yingyi Shengshen Xuanwen Guangwu Hongren Daxiao Su (欽天履道英毅聖神宣文廣武洪仁大孝肅皇帝)	Zhu Houcong 朱厚熜	27 May 1521 – 23 January 1567 (45 years, 7 months and 26 days) Era(s): Zhengde (正德) 27 May 1506 – 26 January 1522; Jiajing (嘉靖) 28 January 1522 – 23 January 1567	Grandson of Chenghua, cousin of Zhengde	16 September 1507 – 23 January 1567 (aged 59) Died of natural causes
	Longqing 隆慶 Other names: Temple name: Muzong (穆宗) Posthumous name (short): Emperor Zhuang (莊皇帝) Posthumous name (long): Emperor Qitian Longdao Yuanyi Kuanren Xianwen Guangwu Chunde Hongxiao Zhuang (契天隆道淵懿寬仁顯文光武純德弘孝莊皇帝)	Zhu Zaiji 朱載坖	4 February 1567 – 5 July 1572 (5 years, 5 months and 1 day) Era(s): Jiajing (嘉靖) 4 February 1567 – 8 February 1567; Longqing (隆慶) 9 February 1567 – 5 July 1572	Son of Jiajing	4 March 1537 – 5 July 1572 (aged 35) Died of natural causes
	Wanli 萬曆 Other names: Temple name: Shénzōng (神宗) Posthumous name (short): Emperor Xian (顯皇帝) Posthumous name (long): Emperor Fantian Hedao Zhesu Dunjian Guangwen Zhangwu Anren Zhixiao Xian (範天合道哲肅敦簡光文章武安仁止孝顯皇帝)	Zhu Yijun 朱翊鈞	19 July 1572 – 18 August 1620 (48 years and 30 days) Era(s): Longqing (隆慶) 19 July 1572 – 1 February 1573; Wanli (萬曆) 2 February 1573 – 18 August 1620	Son of Longqing	4 September 1563 – 18 August 1620 (aged 56) Despite early successes, the gradual decline of Ming began towards the end of his reign. Died of natural causes
	Taichang 泰昌 Other names: Temple name: Guangzong (光宗) Posthumous name (short): Emperor Zhen (貞皇帝) Posthumous name (long): Emperor Chongtian Qidao Yingrui Gongchun Xianwen Jingwu Yuanren Yixiao Zhen (崇天契道英睿恭純憲文景武淵仁懿孝貞皇帝)	Zhu Changluo 朱常洛	28 August – 26 September 1620 (29 days) Era(s): Taichang (泰昌) 28 August 1620 – 26 September 1620	Son of Wanli	28 August 1582 – 26 September 1620 (aged 38) Died suddenly after a reign of around a month, possibly murdered by poison
	Tianqi 天啓 Other names: Temple name: Xizong (熹宗) Posthumous name (short): Emperor Zhen (貞皇帝) Posthumous name (long): Emperor Datian Chandao Dunxiao Duyou Zhangwen Xiangwu Jingmu Zhuangqin Zhen (達天闡道敦孝篤友章文襄武靖穆莊勤悊皇帝)	Zhu Youjiao 朱由校	1 October 1620 – 30 September 1627 (6 years, 11 months and 29 days) Era(s): Taichang (泰昌) 1 October 1620 – 21 January 1621; Tianqi (天啓) 22 January 1621 – 30 September 1627	Son of Taichang	23 December 1605 – 30 September 1627 (aged 21) A weak ruler, his reign was dominated by the eunuch Wei Zhongxian. Died from an unknown illness
Chongzhen 崇禎 Other names: Temple name: Sīzōng (思宗) Posthumous name (short): Emperor Min (愍皇帝) Posthumous name (long): Emperor Zhuanglie Min (莊烈愍皇帝)		Zhu Youjian 朱由檢	2 October 1627 – 25 April 1644 (16 years, 6 months and 23 days) Era(s): Tianqi (天啓) 2 October 1627 – 4 February 1628; Chongzhen (崇禎) 5 February 1628 – 25 April 1644	Son of Taichang, brother of Tianqi	6 February 1611 – 25 April 1644 (aged 33) Committed suicide, possibly by hanging himself on a tree.

=== Qing dynasty (1644–1912) ===
Qing dynasty (大清; 1644–1912)
Portrait	Era name	Personal name	Reign (Note: In the Qing dynasty, a few days usually separate each emperor's reign. When a Qing emperor died there was a period of mourning, after which the successor was crowned as soon a "propitious" day was chosen. Emperors reigned in their predecessor's era name until a new era name was declared at the beginning of the next year. Thus, the Shunzhi (順治) era did not technically end with the Shunzhi Emperor's death on 5 February 1661, but ended on 17 February 1662 when the subsequent Kangxi Emperor began a new era on 18 February 1662.)	Succession	Life details
	Shunzhi 順治 Other names: Temple name: Shizu (世祖) Posthumous name (short): Emperor Zhang (章皇帝) Posthumous name (long): Emperor Titian Longyun Dingtong Jianji Yingrui Qinwen Xianwu Dahe Honggong Zhiren Chunxiao Zhang (體天隆運定統建極英睿欽文顯武大德弘功至仁純孝章皇帝)	Fulin 福臨	8 November 1644 – 5 February 1661 (16 years, 2 months and 28 days) (Note: The Shunzhi Emperor actually began his reign in 1643, but did not control China proper until 1644. His predecessor, Hong Taiji (r. 1636–1643), ruled as a rival to the Ming dynasty.) Era(s): Shunzhi (順治) 8 November 1644 – 5 February 1661	Son of Hong Taiji; chosen by a council of Manchu princes	15 March 1638 – 5 February 1661 (aged 22) Finished the Manchu conquest of the Ming, pushing the remaining Ming sympathizers to the South. Died suddenly of smallpox
	Kangxi 康熙 Other names: Temple name: Shengzu (聖祖) Posthumous name (short): Emperor Ren (仁皇帝) Posthumous name (long): Emperor Hetian Hongyun Wenwu Ruizhe Gongjian Kuanyu Xiaojing Chengxin Zhonghe Gongde Dacheng Ren (合天弘運文武睿哲恭儉寬裕孝敬誠信中和功德大成仁皇帝)	Xuanye 玄燁	5 February 1661 – 20 December 1722 (61 years, 10 months and 15 days) Era(s): Shunzhi (順治) 17 February 1661 – 17 February 1662; Kangxi (康熙) 18 February 1662 – 20 December 1722	Son of Shunzhi	4 May 1654 – 20 December 1722 (aged 68) Longest ruling Chinese emperor. Expanded the empire's territory, and commissioned both the Kangxi Dictionary and Complete Tang Poems. Died of natural causes
	Yongzheng 雍正 Other names: Temple name: Shizong (世宗) Posthumous name (short): Emperor Xian (憲皇帝) Posthumous name (long): Emperor Jingtian Changyun Jianzhong Biaozhen Wenwu Yingming Kuanren Xinyi Ruisheng Daxiao Zhicheng Xian (敬天昌運建中表正文武英明寬仁信毅睿聖大孝至誠憲皇帝)	Yinzhen 胤禛	27 December 1722 – 8 October 1735 (12 years, 9 months and 11 days) Era(s): Kangxi (康熙) 20 December 1722 – 4 February 1723; Yongzheng (雍正) 5 February 1723 – 8 October 1735	Son of Kangxi	13 December 1678 – 8 October 1735 (aged 56) Ruled for a relatively short period, establishing the Grand Council. Probably died of alchemical elixir poisoning; death officially recorded as natural causes. (Note: There are popular, though unsubstantiated, rumors that the Yongzheng Emperor was killed by the daughter of Lü Liuliang, whom he had executed.)
	Qianlong 乾隆 Other names: Temple name: Gaozong (高宗) Posthumous name (short): Emperor Chun (純皇帝) Posthumous name (long): Emperor Fatian Longyun Zhicheng Xianjue Tiyuan Liji Fuwen Fenwu Qinming Xiaoci Shensheng Chun (法天隆運至誠先覺體元立極敷文奮武欽明孝慈神聖純皇帝)	Hongli 弘曆	18 October 1735 – 9 February 1796 (60 years, 3 months and 22 days) Era(s): Yongzheng (雍正) 18 October 1735 – 11 February 1736; Qianlong (乾隆) 12 February 1736 – 8 February 1796	Son of Yongzheng	25 September 1711 – 7 February 1799 (aged 87) Brought the empire to its height. Died of natural causes
	Jiaqing 嘉慶 Other names: Temple name: Renzong (仁宗) Posthumous name (short): Emperor Rui (睿皇帝) Posthumous name (long): Emperor Shoutian Xingyun Fuhua Suiyou Chongwen Jingwu Guangyu Xiaogong Qinjian Duanmin Yingzhe Rui (受天興運敷化綏猷崇文經武光裕孝恭勤儉端敏英哲睿皇帝)	Yongyan 顒琰	9 February 1796 – 2 September 1820 (24 years, 6 months and 24 days) Era(s): Jiaqing (嘉慶) 9 February 1796 – 2 September 1820	Son of Qianlong	13 November 1760 – 2 September 1820 (aged 59) Died suddenly from apoplexy
A man in a grey suit, white shirt and dark tie, he has a birthmark on his forehead	Daoguang 道光 Other names: Temple name: Xuanzong (宣宗) Posthumous name (short): Emperor Cheng (成皇帝) Posthumous name (long): Emperor Xiaotian Fuyun Lizhong Tizheng Zhiwen Shengwu Zhiyong Renci Jianqin Xiaomin Kuanding Cheng (效天符運立中體正至文聖武智勇仁慈儉勤孝敏寬定成皇帝)	Minning 旻寧	3 October 1820 – 26 February 1850 (29 years, 4 months and 23 days) Era(s): Jiaqing (嘉慶) 3 October 1820 – 2 February 1821; Daoguang (道光) 3 February 1821 – 25 February 1850	Son of Jiaqing	16 September 1782 – 25 February 1850 (aged 67) An ineffective ruler who led a highly unstable reign, marked by the First Opium War and the early Taiping Rebellion. Probably died from a stroke
	Xianfeng 咸豐 Other names: Temple name: Wenzong (文宗) Posthumous name (short): Emperor Xian (顯皇帝) Posthumous name (long): Emperor Xietian Yiyun Zhizhong Chuimo Maode Zhenwu Shengxiao Yuangong Duanren Kuanmin Zhuangjian Xian (協天翊運執中垂謨懋德振武聖孝淵恭端仁寬敏莊儉顯皇帝)	Yizhu 奕詝	9 March 1850 – 22 August 1861 (11 years, 5 months and 13 days) Era(s): Daoguang (道光) 9 March 1850 – 30 January 1851; Xianfeng (咸豐) 1 February 1851 – 22 August 1861	Son of Daoguang	17 July 1831 – 22 August 1861 (aged 30) The last Chinese emperor to have personal power for the entirety of his reign, which was unstable after the Taiping Rebellion, Nian Rebellion and Second Opium War. Died of natural causes
	Tongzhi 同治 Other names: Temple name: Muzong (穆宗) Posthumous name (short): Emperor Yi (毅皇帝) Posthumous name (long): Emperor Jitian Kaiyun Shouzhong Juzheng Baoda Dinggong Shengzhi Chengxiao Xinmin Gongkuan Mingsu Yi (繼天開運受中居正保大定功聖智誠孝信敏恭寬明肅毅皇帝)	Zaichun 載淳	11 November 1861 – 12 January 1875 (13 years, 2 months and 1 day) Era(s): Qixiang (祺祥) August 1861 – 11 November 1861; Xianfeng (咸豐) 11 November 1861 – 29 January 1862; Tongzhi (同治) 30 January 1862 – 12 January 1875	Son of Xianfeng	27 April 1856 – 12 January 1875 (aged 18) Reign was completely dominated by Empress Dowager Cixi, who initiated the Tongzhi Restoration. Died suddenly, under suspicious circumstances
	Guangxu 光緒 Other names: Temple name: Dezong (德宗) Posthumous name (short): Emperor Jing (景皇帝) Posthumous name (long): Emperor Tongtian Chongyun Dazhong Zhizheng Jingwen Weiwu Renxiao Ruizhi Duanjian Kuanqin Jing (同天崇運大中至正經文緯武仁孝睿智端儉寬勤景皇帝)	Zaitian 載湉	25 February 1875 – 14 November 1908 (33 years, 8 months and 20 days) Era(s): Guangxu (光緒) 25 February 1875 – 14 November 1908	Cousin of Tongzhi	14 August 1871 – 14 November 1908 (aged 37) Initiated the failed Hundred Days' Reform, and from 1898 on, his reign was completely dominated by Empress Dowager Cixi. Died of poisoning, possibly from Cixi.
	Xuantong 宣統 Other names: Temple name: Gongzong (恭宗) (Note: The Xuantong Emperor was only given posthumous and temple names in 2004 when the Qing family's descendants bestowed him with them.) Posthumous name (short): Emperor Min (愍帝) Posthumous name (long): Emperor Peitian Tongyun Fagu Shaotong Cuiwen Jingfu Kuanrui Zhengmu Tiren Lixiao Min (配天同運法古紹統粹文敬孚寬睿正穆體仁立孝愍皇帝)	Puyi 溥儀	2 December 1908 – 12 February 1912 (3 years, 2 months and 10 days) Era(s): Xuantong (宣統) 2 December 1908 – 12 February 1912	Nephew of Guangxu	7 February 1906 – 17 October 1967 (aged 61) Reigned as a young child, but was forced to abdicate in 1912 amid the 1911 Revolution, ending the 2,000-year monarchial system of Imperial China.
For the subsequent heads of state of China, see List of presidents of the Republic of China and List of state representatives of the People's Republic of China

== Restoration attempts ==
=== Empire of China (1915–1916) ===
Empire of China (中華帝國; 1915–1916)
Portrait	Era name	Personal name	Reign	Succession	Life details
	Hongxian 洪憲	Yuan Shikai 袁世凱	12 December 1915 – 22 March 1916 (3 months and 10 days) Era(s): Hongxian (洪憲) 12 December 1915 – 22 March 1916	President of the Republic of China; self-proclaimed emperor in an attempt to secure his rule	16 September 1859 – 6 June 1916 (aged 56) Proclamation as emperor was highly unpopular, prompting his abdication and a restoration of the republic. Died of kidney failure, whereafter China was plunged into a period of warlordism.

=== Manchu Restoration (1917) ===
Qing dynasty (大清; 1917)
Portrait	Era name	Personal name	Reign	Succession	Life details
	Xuantong (second reign)	Aisin-Gioro Puyi 愛新覺羅溥儀	1–12 July 1917 (11 days) Era(s): Xuantong (宣統) 1–12 July 1917	Briefly restored to the throne by the warlord Zhang Xun	7 February 1906 – 17 October 1967 (aged 61) Deposed again. Later made puppet emperor of the Japanese puppet state Manchukuo (1934–1945) during World War II. Died of natural causes.
