= Historical capitals of China =

- Traditional Chinese: 中國四大古都
- Simplified Chinese: 中国四大古都
Transcriptions
Standard Mandarin
- Hanyu Pinyin: Zhōngguó sì dà gǔdū
- Wade–Giles: Chung-kuo ssu ta ku-tu

Xi'an

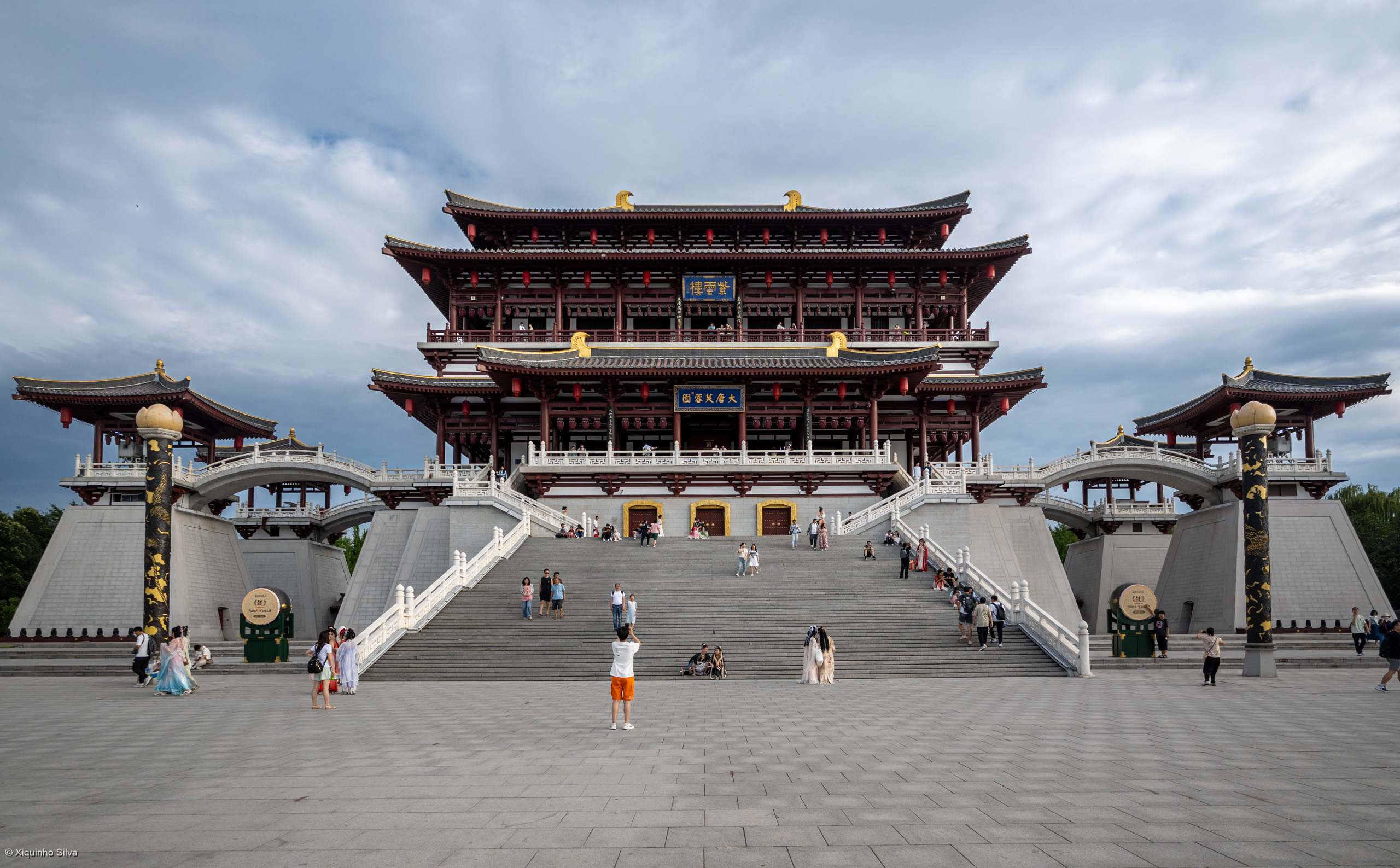
Tang Paradise, a complex in Xi'an to show the restoration of its past. Xi'an used to be the capital of 13 dynasties, among whom were Zhou, Qin, Han, Sui, and Tang, which are regarded as the most important dynasties in Chinese history

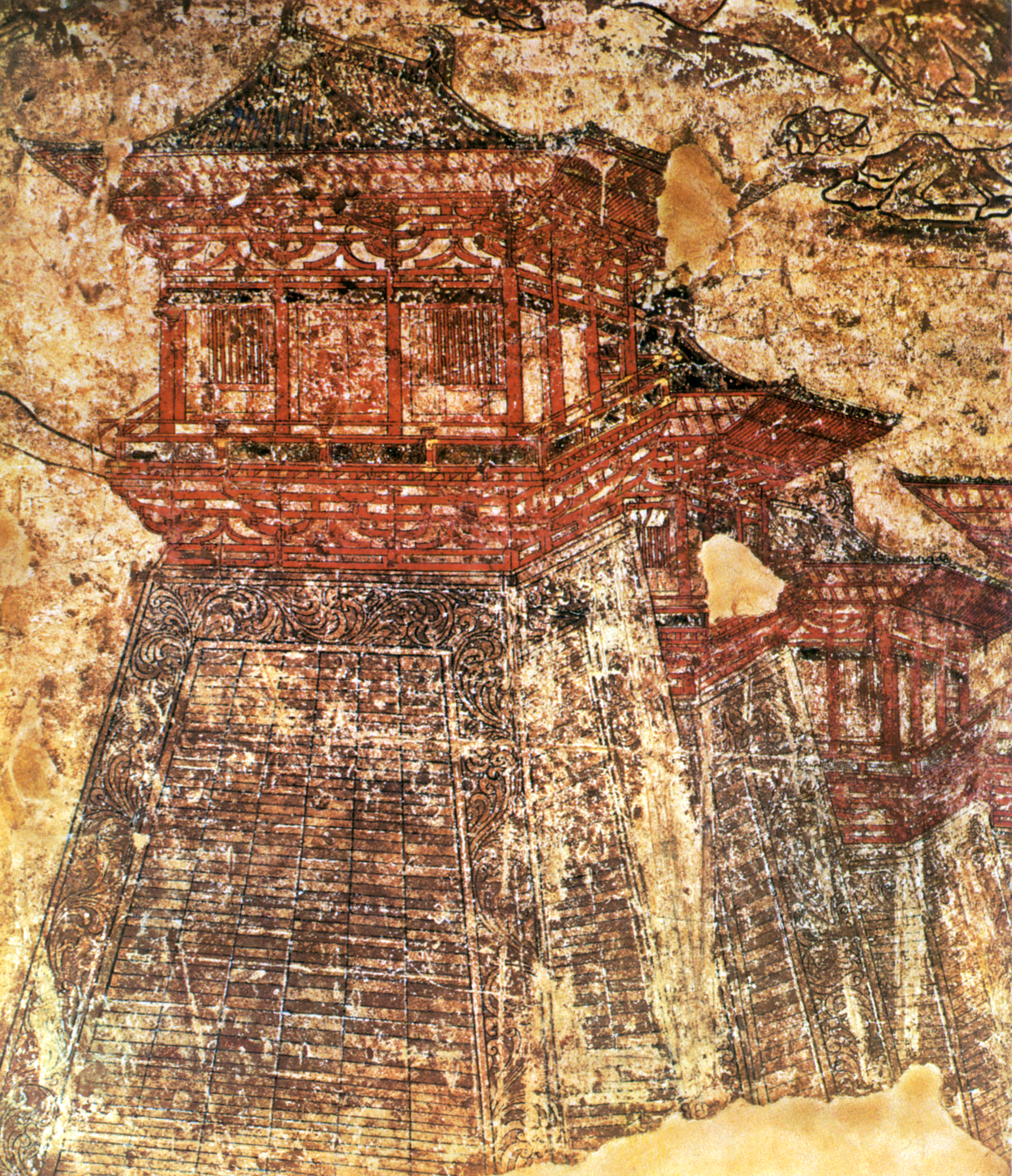
8th century murals in Prince Yide's tomb illustrating the architectures in Chang'an

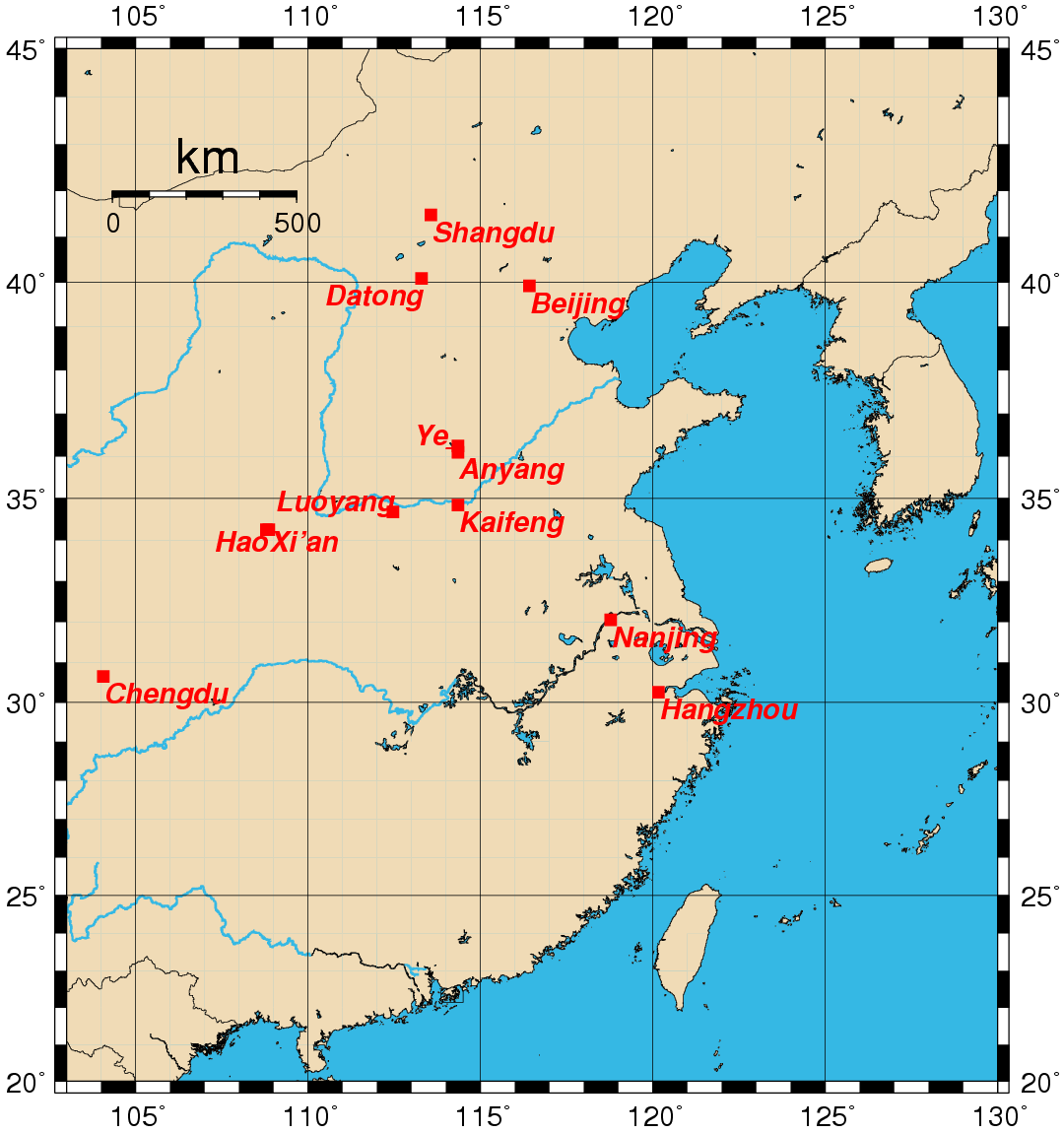
Plot of major historical capitals of China prior to the 20th century

There are traditionally five major historical capitals of China, often addressed using cardinal directions:

- Xi'an or the "western capital", known as Fenghao during the Western Zhou dynasty, as Chang'an during the Western Han, Western Jin and Tang dynasties, and as Daxing during the Sui dynasty;
- Luoyang or the "central capital", during the Eastern Zhou and Eastern Han dynasties;
- Nanjing or the "southern capital", as Jiankang during the Eastern Jin, the four Southern Dynasties and the late Republic of China, and as Yingtian during the early Ming dynasty;
- Kaifeng or the "eastern capital", during the Five Dynasties and the Northern Song dynasty;
- Beijing or the "northern capital", during the Ming and Qing dynasties (and the contemporary People's Republic of China), and as Dadu during the Yuan dynasty.

There are also many other cities that historically served as capitals of various rump states and minor states, although only the capitals of the uniform dynasties are typically mentioned.

== List of historical capitals of China ==
Sorted in alphabetical order

- Acheng District of the city of Harbin was the capital of the Jin dynasty from 1115 to 1153. It was called Shangjing (上京; Shàngjīng; 'Upper Capital') or Huining Prefecture at the time. It was destroyed in 1157 and reestablished as a secondary capital in 1173.
- Anyang was the capital of the Shang dynasty (1600 BC – 1046 BC) at its peak. It was called Yin (殷; Yīn) by the Zhou.
- Balasagun in modern Kyrgyzstan was the capital of the Western Liao dynasty from 1134 to 1218.
- Beijing (also romanized Peking), literally meaning "Northern Capital", previously also known as Beiping, was the capital of various dynasties and regional regimes, including:

- The state of Yan (11th century BC – 222 BC) in the Zhou dynasty, when it was called Ji (蓟; 薊; Jì).
- The short-lived regional kingdom of Yan (911–914) established by Liu Shouguang during Five Dynasties period.
- The Liao dynasty (907–1125), when it was a secondary capital called Yanjing (燕京; Yānjīng; 'Capital of Yan'). (Liao Lang is used as another name for Dadu during Yuan dynasty. The city is called Nanjing (南京, not to be confused with city in Jiangsu) in Liao dynasty due to the southerly location.)
- The Jurchen-led Jin dynasty, from the 1160s to 1215, when it was called Zhongdu (中都; Zhōngdū; 'Central Capital').
- The Yuan dynasty (1271–1368), when it was called Dadu (大都; Dàdū; 'Great Capital') in Chinese, Daidu (direct translation from Chinese) in Mongolian, and Khanbaliq ("city of the Khan") in Mongolian and Turkic languages. Marco Polo called it Cambuluc.
- The Ming dynasty, from 1403 to 1644, when it was called Shuntian Prefecture (顺天府; 順天府; Shùntiān Fǔ) and then later simply as Jingshi (京师; 京師; Jīngshī; 'Capital').
- The Qing dynasty, from 1644 to 1912.
- The Beiyang government of the Republic of China, from 1912 to 1927.
- The People's Republic of China since 1949.

- Changchun was the capital of Japanese puppet state Manchukuo during the Japanese occupation in WWII, then named Xinjing (新京; Japanese: Shinkyō, Mandarin: Xīnjīng, literally "New Capital").
- Chengde was the summer residence and capital of the Qing dynasty from 1703 to 1820.
- Chengdu was the capital city of various regional kingdoms in ancient China:

- State of Shu in Warring States period
- Shu Han (AD 221–263) during the Three Kingdoms period
- Kingdom of Cheng-Han during Eastern Jin period
- Qiao Shu, a short-lived kingdom during Eastern Jin period
- The kingdom of Li Shu, a short-lived regime established by Wang Xiaobo and Li Shun during Song dynasty
- Former Shu, one of Ten Kingdoms between Tang and Song dynasties
- Later Shu, one of Ten Kingdoms between Tang and Song dynasties
- Da Xi established by Zhang Xianzhong during the transition between Ming and Qing dynasties
- It was also briefly the seat of the Nationalist government of the Republic of China in late 1949 towards the end of the Chinese Civil War.

- Chongqing was the capital city of Ba State during Warring States period. Ming Yuzhen, the rebellion leader during the transition time between Yuan and Ming dynasties, established the Xia kingdom and set the capital city in Chongqing. Chongqing was also the provisional capital of the Nationalist government of the Republic of China during the Second Sino-Japanese War (1937–1945), and briefly the seat of the Nationalist government in late 1949 towards the end of the Chinese Civil War.
- Datong was the capital of the Northern Wei dynasty from 398 to 493.
- Emin was briefly the capital of the Western Liao dynasty from 1132 to 1134.
- Fenghao, consisting of the twin cities of Fengjing and Haojing, was the capital of the Western Zhou dynasty.
- Fuzhou was briefly the capital of the Southern Ming dynasty from 1645 to 1646.
- Guangzhou (also romanized Canton) was the capital of:

- Nanyue Kingdom (204–111 BC).
- Southern Ming dynasty from 1646 to 1647.
- Nationalist government of the Republic of China, before 1928 and in 1949 towards the end of the Chinese Civil War.

- Hangzhou was the capital of:

- Wuyue Kingdom (907–978) during the Five Dynasties and Ten Kingdoms period.
- Southern Song dynasty, from 1127 to 1276, when it was called Lin'an (临安; 臨安; Lín'ān).

- Kaifeng was the capital of various dynasties, including:

- The state of Wei (443 BC – 225 BC) in the Zhou dynasty, when it was called Daliang.
- Later Liang dynasty during the Five Dynasties and Ten Kingdoms period, from AD 913 to 923.
- Later Jin dynasty during the Five Dynasties and Ten Kingdoms period, in AD 937.
- Later Han dynasty (AD 947–951) during the Five Dynasties and Ten Kingdoms period.
- Later Zhou dynasty (AD 951–960) during the Five Dynasties and Ten Kingdoms period.
- Northern Song dynasty (960–1127), when it was called Bianjing (汴京; Biànjīng).

- Karakorum in modern Mongolia was the capital of the Northern Yuan dynasty from 1371 to 1388.
- Luoyang was the capital of various dynasties, including:

- The Eastern Zhou dynasty, from 510 BC to 314 BC.
- The Eastern Han dynasty from AD 25 to 190 and then briefly in AD 196.
- The Cao Wei (AD 220–265) during the Three Kingdoms period.
- The Western Jin dynasty, from AD 265 to 311.
- The Northern Wei dynasty from AD 493 to 534.
- The Wu Zhou from AD 690 to 705.
- The Later Tang dynasty during the Five Dynasties and Ten Kingdoms period, from AD 923 to 936.
- The Later Liang dynasty during the Five Dynasties and Ten Kingdoms period, from AD 907 to 913.

- Nanjing (also romanized Nanking), literally meaning "Southern Capital", was the capital of various dynasties and governments, including:

- All the Six Dynasties from AD 220 to 589, when Nanjing was called Jianye (建業; Jiànyè) or Jiankang (建康; Jiànkāng). The Six Dynasties were:

- Eastern Wu during the Three Kingdoms period, from AD 229 to 265, and then from AD 266 to 280.
- Eastern Jin dynasty, from AD 317 to 420.
- Liu Song dynasty (AD 420–479)
- Southern Qi dynasty (AD 479–502)
- Liang dynasty, from AD 502 to 552, and then from AD 555 to 557.
- Chen dynasty (AD 557–589)

- The Southern Tang dynasty (AD 937–976) during the Five Dynasties and Ten Kingdoms period, when it was called Jiangning Prefecture (江宁府; 江寧府; Jiāngníng Fǔ)
- The Ming dynasty, from 1368 to 1644, when it was also called Yingtian Prefecture (应天府; 應天府; Yìngtiān Fǔ)
- The Southern Ming dynasty from 1644 to 1645.
- The Taiping Heavenly Kingdom (1851–1864) during the Taiping Rebellion in the Qing dynasty, when it was called Tianjing (天京; Tiānjīng; 'Heavenly Capital').
- The Nationalist government of the Republic of China from 1928 to 1949.
- The Reorganized National Government of the Republic of China (1940–1945), a pro-Japanese collaborationist government headed by Wang Jingwei during the Second Sino-Japanese War.

- Ruijin in Jiangxi province was the capital of the self-declared Chinese Soviet Republic from 1931 to 1934, until the Communist defeat during the Fifth Encirclement and the start of the Long March.
- Shaoguan, then known in English as Kukong, was the temporary capital of Nationalist-controlled areas of Guangdong province (then known as Kwangtung) during the Sino-Japanese war, after the fall of Guangzhou.
- Shenyang in the northeastern province of Liaoning, previously also known as Shengjing (盛京; Shèngjīng; 'Prosperous Capital') or Mukden, briefly served as the capital of the Manchu Later Jin, the predecessor of the Qing dynasty, from 1625 until Qing occupation of Beijing in 1644.
- Taipei in Taiwan has been the de facto capital and the seat of the Government of the Republic of China since the retreat of the Nationalist Government to the island in 1949 at the end of the Chinese Civil War.
- Tongwancheng was the capital of the Hu Xia dynasty from 419 to 427.
- Wuhan was the capital of a government formed in 1927 by Wang Jingwei and leftist members of the Kuomintang, who opposed the Nationalist government led by Kuomintang leader Chiang Kai-shek. It was also briefly a "provisional wartime capital" in 1937 during the Second Sino-Japanese War, when Wang was treasonously collaborating with the Japanese.
- Xanadu / Shangdu (上都; Shàngdū; 'Upper Capital'), located northwest of present-day Dolon Nor in Inner Mongolia, China, was the summer capital of the Yuan dynasty. After the fall of the Yuan dynasty, it briefly became the capital of the Northern Yuan dynasty between 1368 and 1369. It was destroyed in 1369.
- Xi'an (also romanized Sian), previously usually called Chang'an, and including its surrounding areas in present-day Shaanxi Province, was the capital of various dynasties, including:

- The Western Zhou dynasty, from around 1046 BC to 771 BC. See also Fenghao.
- The state of Qin (9th century BC – 221 BC) and the Qin dynasty (221–206 BC). The Qin capital, called Xianyang (simplified Chinese: 咸阳; traditional Chinese: 咸陽; pinyin: Xiányáng), was located near present-day Xi'an. It was destroyed by fire in 206 BC by Xiang Yu.
- The Western Han dynasty, from 206 BC to AD 9.
- The Xin dynasty (AD 9–23), referred as Chang'an (常安; Cháng'ān; 'perpetually safe')
- The Eastern Han dynasty, from AD 190 to 195.
- The Western Jin dynasty, from AD 312 to 316.
- The state of Former Zhao during the Sixteen Kingdoms period, from AD 318 to 329.
- The State of Former Qin during the Sixteen Kingdoms period, from AD 351 to 385.
- The State of Later Qin during the Sixteen Kingdoms period, from AD 384 to 417.
- The Western Wei dynasty (AD 535–557)
- The Northern Zhou dynasty (AD 557–581)
- The Sui dynasty, from AD 581 to 605, referred to as Daxing (大兴; 大興; Dàxīng; 'Great Prosperity')
- The Tang dynasty, from AD 618 to 684, and then from AD 705 to 904.

- Ye (邺; 鄴; Yè), located within the present-day city of Handan, was one of secondary capital cities of Cao Wei (220–265), and the capital city of several of the Sixteen Kingdoms during the Eastern Jin period: Later Zhao (319–351), Ran Wei (350–352) and Former Yan (337–370). It was also the capital of two major northern dynasties in Southern and Northern dynasties period: Eastern Wei dynasty (534–550), and the Northern Qi dynasty (550–577).
- Yinchuan was the capital of the Tangut Western Xia from 1038 to 1227, when it was called Xingqing (simplified Chinese: 兴庆; traditional Chinese: 興慶; pinyin: Xīngqìng).
- Yingchang was briefly the capital of the Northern Yuan dynasty from 1369 to 1370.
- Zhaoge was the secondary capital city during last years of Shang dynasty when it was ruled by the final monarch King Zhou. Later, it was the capital city of Wey state during the Eastern Zhou period.
- Zhaoqing was the capital of the Southern Ming dynasty from 1646 to 1662.
Legend: "Four Great Ancient Capitals", "Eight Great Ancient Capitals".

== Chronology ==
Dynasty / Government		Capital	Period	Notes
Three Sovereigns and Five Emperors	Nüwa			
Three Sovereigns and Five Emperors	Youchao			
Three Sovereigns and Five Emperors	Suiren			
Three Sovereigns and Five Emperors	Zhurong			
Three Sovereigns and Five Emperors	Fuxi	Chen 陳	c. 2852–2737 BC	
Three Sovereigns and Five Emperors	Shennong / Yan Emperor	Lu 魯	c. 2737–2699 BC	
Three Sovereigns and Five Emperors	Yellow Emperor	Xuanyuan 軒轅	c. 2699–2588 BC	
Three Sovereigns and Five Emperors	Taihao	Wanqiu 宛丘		
Three Sovereigns and Five Emperors	Shaohao	Qiongsang 窮桑	c. 2587–2491 BC	
Three Sovereigns and Five Emperors	Gonggong			
Three Sovereigns and Five Emperors	Zhuanxu	Gaoyang 高陽	c. 2490 BC – 25th century BC	
Three Sovereigns and Five Emperors	Zhuanxu	Diqiu 帝丘	c. 25th century BC – 2413 BC	
Three Sovereigns and Five Emperors	Ku	Diqiu 帝丘	c. 2412 BC – 24th century BC	
Three Sovereigns and Five Emperors	Ku	Bo 亳	c. 24th century BC – 2343 BC	
Three Sovereigns and Five Emperors	Zhi	Qinghua 清化	c. 2343–2333 BC	
Three Sovereigns and Five Emperors	Yao	Pingyang 平陽	c. 2333–2234 BC	
Three Sovereigns and Five Emperors	Shun	Puban 蒲坂	c. 2233–2184 BC	
Xia dynasty		Daxia 大夏	Gun	
Xia dynasty		Song 嵩	Gun	
Xia dynasty		Yangcheng 陽城	Yu	
Xia dynasty		Yangzhai 陽翟	Yu, Qi, Taikang	
Xia dynasty		Chu 鉏	Hou Yi	
Xia dynasty		Qiongshi 窮石	Hou Yi, Hanzhuo	
Xia dynasty		Zhen 斟	Taikang, Zhongkang	
Xia dynasty		Diqiu 帝丘	Xiang, Shaokang	
Xia dynasty		Yuan 原	Zhu	
Xia dynasty		Laoqiu 老丘	Zhu to Jiong	
Xia dynasty		Xihe 西河	Jin to Fa	
Xia dynasty		Zhen 斟	Jie	
Xia dynasty		Henan 河南	Jie	
Shang dynasty		Bo 亳	Tang	
Shang dynasty		Fan 蕃	Xie	
Shang dynasty		Dishi 砥石	Zhaoming	
Shang dynasty		Shang 商	Zhaoming	
Shang dynasty		Shangqiu 商邱	Xiangtu	
Shang dynasty		Foot of Mount Tai 泰山麓	Xiangtu	
Shang dynasty		Shangqiu 商邱	Xiangtu	
Shang dynasty		Yin 殷	Shanghou	
Shang dynasty		Shangqiu 商邱	Yinhou	
Shang dynasty		Bo "西"亳	Tang	
Shang dynasty		Xiao 囂	Zhongding	
Shang dynasty		Xiang 相	Hedanjia	
Shang dynasty		Xing 邢	Zuyi	
Shang dynasty		Bi 庇	Zuyi	
Shang dynasty		Yan 奄	Nangeng	
Shang dynasty		Yin 殷	Pangeng	
Zhou dynasty	Western Zhou	Zongzhou 宗周	1046 BC – 771 BC	Western capital
Zhou dynasty	Western Zhou	Chengzhou 成周	1039 BC – 771 BC	Eastern capital(auxiliary capital)
Zhou dynasty	Eastern Zhou	Chengzhou 成周	770 BC – 367 BC	
Zhou dynasty	Eastern Zhou	Henan 河南	367 BC – 256 BC	capital of the Western Zhou State
Zhou dynasty	Eastern Zhou	Gong 鞏	367 BC – 249 BC	capital of the Eastern Zhou State
Qin dynasty		Xiquanqiu 西犬丘		Modern Tianshui, Gansu.
Qin dynasty		Pingyang 平陽	– 677 BC	Modern Baoji, Shaanxi.
Qin dynasty		Yong 雍	677 BC –	Near Baoji, Shaanxi.
Qin dynasty		Jingyang 涇陽	– 383 BC	Near Xianyang, Shaanxi.
Qin dynasty		Yueyang 櫟陽	383 BC – 250 BC	Located in modern Xi'an.
Qin dynasty		Xianyang 咸陽	350 BC – 207 BC	Near modern Xianyang, Shaanxi
Han dynasty	Western Han	Luoyang 雒陽	202 BC	
Han dynasty	Western Han	Yueyang 櫟陽	202 BC – 200 BC	Located in modern Xi'an
Han dynasty	Western Han	Chang'an 長安	200 BC – 8 BC	
Xin dynasty		Chang'an 常安	AD 8–23	
Han dynasty	Eastern Han	Luoyang 雒陽	AD 25–190	
Han dynasty	Eastern Han	Chang'an 長安	191–195	
Han dynasty	Eastern Han	Xu 許	196–220	Modern Xuchang, Henan.
Three Kingdoms period	Cao Wei	Luoyang 洛陽	220–265	
Three Kingdoms period	Shu Han	Chengdu 成都	221–263	
Three Kingdoms period	Eastern Wu	Jianye 建業	227–279	Later called Jiankang. Located near modern Nanjing.
Jin dynasty	Western Jin	Luoyang 洛陽	265–313	
Jin dynasty	Western Jin	Chang'an 長安	313–316	
Jin dynasty	Eastern Jin	Jiankang 建康	317–420	Located near modern Nanjing.
Northern dynasties	Northern Wei	Pingcheng 平城	386–493	Modern Datong, Shanxi.
Northern dynasties	Northern Wei	Luoyang 洛陽	493–534	
Northern dynasties	Eastern Wei	Ye 鄴	534–550	Located in modern Handan, Hebei.
Northern dynasties	Western Wei	Chang'an 長安	535–557	
Northern dynasties	Northern Qi	Ye 鄴	550–577	
Northern dynasties	Northern Zhou	Chang'an 長安	557–581	
Southern dynasties	Liu Song	Jiankang 建康	420–479	
Southern dynasties	Southern Qi	Jiankang 建康	479–502	
Southern dynasties	Liang dynasty	Jiankang 建康	502–557	
Southern dynasties	Chen dynasty	Jiankang 建康	557–589	
Sui dynasty		Daxing 大興	581–618	auxiliary capital (605–618). Modern Chang'an.
Sui dynasty		Dongdu 東都	605–618	Modern Luoyang, Henan.
Tang dynasty		Chang'an 長安	618–690	
Tang dynasty		Luoyang 洛陽	657–690	auxiliary capital
Wu Zhou		Luoyang 洛陽	690–705	
Tang dynasty (restored)		Chang'an 長安	705–904	
Tang dynasty (restored)		Luoyang 洛陽	705–736	auxiliary capital
Tang dynasty (restored)		Luoyang 洛陽	904–907	
Five Dynasties and Ten Kingdoms period	Later Liang	Dongdu 東都	907–923	
Five Dynasties and Ten Kingdoms period	Later Tang	Dongdu 東都	923–936	
Five Dynasties and Ten Kingdoms period	Later Jin	Dongjing 東京	936–947	
Five Dynasties and Ten Kingdoms period	Later Han	Dongjing 東京	947–950	
Five Dynasties and Ten Kingdoms period	Later Zhou	Dongjing 東京	951–960	
Song dynasty	Northern Song	Dongjing 東京	960–1127	Modern Kaifeng, Henan.
Song dynasty	Southern Song	Nanjing 南京	1127–1129	After the fall of Dongjing, Zhao Gou declares himself emperor in Henan
Song dynasty	Southern Song	Yangzhou 揚州	1129–1130	Flight of Emperor Gaozong during the Jin invasion of the Yangtze Delta in 1129–1130.
Song dynasty	Southern Song	Zhenjiang 鎮江	1129–1130	Flight of Emperor Gaozong during the Jin invasion of the Yangtze Delta in 1129–1130.
Song dynasty	Southern Song	Lin'an 臨安	1129–1130	Flight of Emperor Gaozong during the Jin invasion of the Yangtze Delta in 1129–1130.
Song dynasty	Southern Song	Yuezhou 越州	1129–1130	Flight of Emperor Gaozong during the Jin invasion of the Yangtze Delta in 1129–1130.
Song dynasty	Southern Song	Mingzhou 明州	1129–1130	Flight of Emperor Gaozong during the Jin invasion of the Yangtze Delta in 1129–1130.
Song dynasty	Southern Song	Dinghai 定海	1129–1130	Flight of Emperor Gaozong during the Jin invasion of the Yangtze Delta in 1129–1130.
Song dynasty	Southern Song	Off the coast Taizhou, Wenzhou "海上朝廷"	1129–1130	Flight of Emperor Gaozong during the Jin invasion of the Yangtze Delta in 1129–1130.
Song dynasty	Southern Song	Zhang'an 章安	1129–1130	Flight of Emperor Gaozong during the Jin invasion of the Yangtze Delta in 1129–1130.
Song dynasty	Southern Song	Yuezhou 越州	1129–1130	Flight of Emperor Gaozong during the Jin invasion of the Yangtze Delta in 1129–1130.
Song dynasty	Southern Song	Lin'an 臨安	1130–1276	Song court settles in Lin'an for 146 years
Song dynasty	Southern Song	Fuzhou 福州	1276–1277	Flight of Emperor Duanzong along the southeast coast following the fall of Lin'an in 1276.
Song dynasty	Southern Song	Guangzhou 廣州	1277–1278	Flight of Emperor Duanzong along the southeast coast following the fall of Lin'an in 1276.
Song dynasty	Southern Song	Guanfuchang 官富場	1278	Flight of Emperor Duanzong along the southeast coast following the fall of Lin'an in 1276.
Song dynasty	Southern Song	Gangzhou 碙州	1278	Emperor Bingzong succeeds Duanzong on Lantau Island in modern Hong Kong
Song dynasty	Southern Song	Yashan 崖山	1278–1279	Song court makes last stand off the coast of Yashan
Liao dynasty		Shangjing 上京	907–1120	Modern Linhuangfu, Inner Mongolia.
Liao dynasty		Nanjing 南京	1122–1123	Modern Beijing.
Western Liao		Emin 葉密立	1132–1134	In modern Xinjiang.
Western Liao		Balasagun 虎思斡耳朵	1134–1218	
Jin dynasty		Shangjing 上京	1115–1153	Also called Huiningfu.
Jin dynasty		Zhongdu 中都	1153–1214	Located in modern-day Beijing.
Jin dynasty		Nanjing 南京	1214–1234	Modern Kaifeng.
Western Xia		Xingqing 興慶	1038–1227	Modern Yinchuan in Ningxia.
Yuan dynasty		Shangdu 上都	May 1264 – 1267	Known in the West as "Xanadu."
Yuan dynasty		Dadu 大都	1267 – August 1368	Also called Khanbaliq; located in modern-day Beijing.
Northern Yuan		Shangdu 上都	August 1368 – 1369	Known in the West as "Xanadu."
Northern Yuan		Yingchang 應昌	1369–1370	
Northern Yuan		Karakorum 哈拉和林	1371–1388	
Ming dynasty		Nanjing 南京	23 January 1368 – 2 February 1421	
Ming dynasty		Beijing 北京	2 February 1421 – 25 April 1644	
Southern Ming		Nanjing 南京	1644 – 1645	
Southern Ming		Fuzhou 福州	1645 – 1646	
Southern Ming		Guangzhou 廣州	1646 – 1647	
Southern Ming		Zhaoqing 肇慶	1646 – 25 April 1662	
Later Jin		Fe Ala 費阿拉	1587–1603	
Later Jin		Hetu Ala 赫圖阿拉	1603–1619	Later renamed Xingjing (興京).
Later Jin		Jiefan 界凡	1619 – September 1620	
Later Jin		Sarhu 薩爾滸	September 1620 – April 1621	
Later Jin		Dongjing 東京	April 1621 – 11 April 1625	
Later Jin		Shengjing 盛京	11 April 1625 – 1636	Today known as Shenyang, also called by the Manchu name "Mukden."
Qing dynasty		Shengjing 盛京	1636 – 30 October 1644	Today known as Shenyang, also called by the Manchu name "Mukden."
Qing dynasty		Beijing 北京	30 October 1644 – 12 February 1912	
Republic of China		Nanjing 南京	1 January 1912 – 2 April 1912	Provisional Government
Republic of China		Beijing 北京	2 April 1912 – 30 May 1928	Beiyang government
Republic of China		Fengtian 奉天	30 May 1928 – 29 December 1928	Beiyang government
Republic of China		Guangzhou 廣州	1 July 1925 – 21 February 1927	Guangzhou Nationalist Government
Republic of China		Wuhan 武漢	21 February 1927 – 19 August 1927	Wuhan Nationalist Government
Republic of China		Nanjing 南京	18 April 1927 – 20 November 1937	the Nanjing decade
Republic of China		Luoyang 洛陽	29 Jan 1932 – 1 December 1932	
Republic of China		Beijing 北平	9 September 1930 – 23 September 1930	Beiping Nationalist Government
Republic of China		Taiyuan 太原	23 September 1930 – 4 November 1930	Beiping Nationalist Government
Republic of China		Guangzhou 廣州	28 May 1931 – 22 December 1931	Guangzhou Nationalist Government
Republic of China		Chongqing 重慶	21 November 1937 – 5 May 1946	during the Second Sino-Japanese War
Republic of China		Nanjing 南京	30 March 1940 – 10 August 1945	Wang Jingwei Government
Republic of China		Nanjing 南京	5 May 1946 – 1 May 1991	From 23 April 1949 to 1 May 1991, Nanjing was the claimed capital of the Republic of China
Republic of China		Guangzhou 廣州	23 April 1949 – 14 October 1949	during the Chinese Civil War
Republic of China		Chongqing 重慶	14 October 1949 – 30 November 1949	during the Chinese Civil War
Republic of China		Chengdu 成都	30 November 1949 – 27 December 1949	during the Chinese Civil War
Republic of China		Xichang 西昌	27 December 1949 – 27 March 1950	during the Chinese Civil War
Republic of China		Taipei 台北	10 December 1949 – Present	Established as capital following the Republic of China retreat to Taiwan
Chinese Soviet Republic; People's Republic of China		Ruijin 瑞金	7 November 1931 – 10 October 1934	Establishments of the Chinese Soviet Republic
Chinese Soviet Republic; People's Republic of China		Bao'an 保安	July 1936 – January 1937	From 1934 to 1936, the Long March occurred.
Chinese Soviet Republic; People's Republic of China		Yan'an 延安	January 1937 – 22 September 1937	CSR dissolves in the midst of the formation of the Second United Front
Chinese Soviet Republic; People's Republic of China		Beijing 北京	1 October 1949 – Present	

== See also ==
- Former capitals of Chinese provinces
- Chinese palace
- Dynasties of China
- History of China
- Names of Beijing
