= King Kang =

King Kang may refer to:

- King Kang of Xia, three rulers of the Xia dynasty with the personal name Kang:
  - Tai Kang (literally "Highest Kang"), third king of Xia
  - Zhong Kang (literally "Second Kang" or "Middle Kang"), fourth king of Xia
  - Shao Kang (literally "Younger Kang"), sixth king of Xia
- King Kang of Zhou (r. 1020–996 BC), king of the Zhou Dynasty
- King Kang of Chu (r. 559–545 BC), king of the State of Chu

== See also ==
- Duke Kang (disambiguation)
