= Xinzhai =

Archaeological site in Henan, China

Xinzhai 新砦
- Location within China
- 34.441667°N 113.541667°E
- Periods: Xia dynasty
- Location: Xinmi, Zhengzhou
- Region: Henan, China
- Part of: Bronze Age China

History
- Built: c. 1870 – c. 1720 BC

Xinzhai (Chinese: 新砦; pinyin: Xīnzhài) is an early Bronze Age archaeological site that was found in 1979 in Henan, China. It is located about 20 kilometres (12 mi) southeast of Xinmi, Zhengzhou.

The culture in Xinzhai existed during the Xia dynasty and is dated from about 1870 BC to 1720 BC. The most prominent finding at Xinzhai is a cultural link between the older Longshan culture and the younger Erlitou culture, and the excavations at Xinzhai show traces of the two adjacent cultures. The city Xinzhai is believed to has been founded by King Qi of Xia, and was the capital of the Xia dynasty until Qi's descendant Shao Kang took control of the dynasty.

== See also ==
- Longshan culture
- Erlitou culture
