= Baishui County =

Coordinates: 35°10′44″N 109°34′48″E

Baishui County 白水县 Paishui
- County
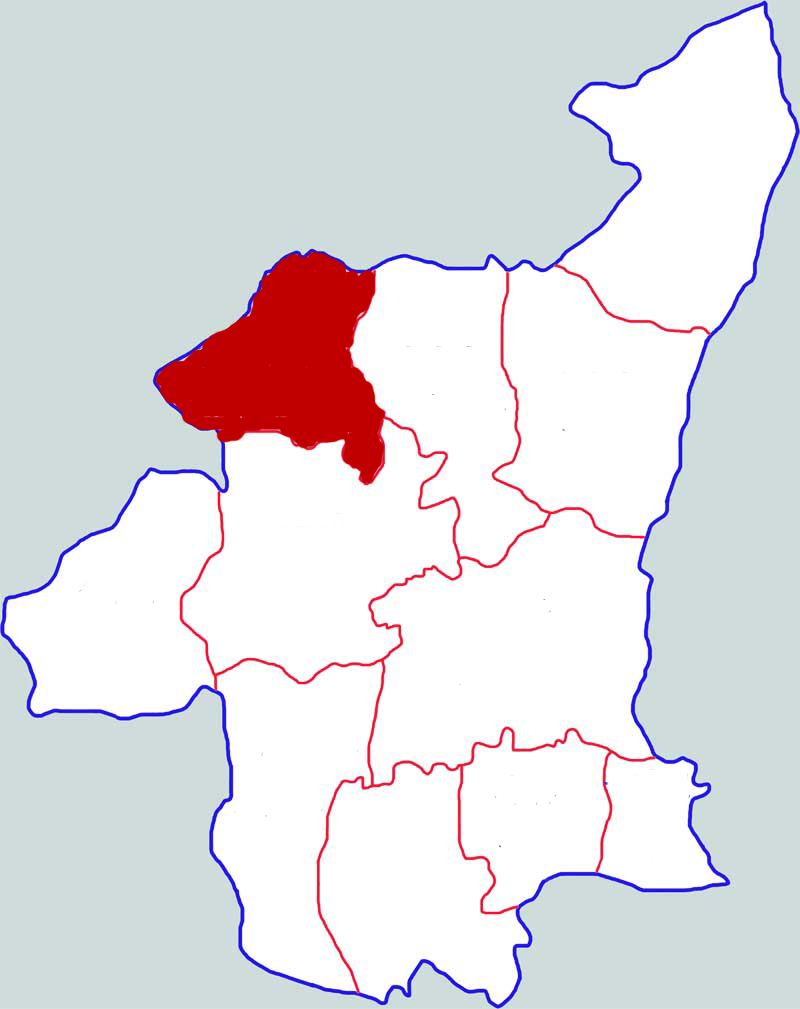
- Location of the county
- Country: People's Republic of China
- Province: Shaanxi
- Prefecture-level city: Weinan

Area
  - Total: 986.6 km^{2} (380.9 sq mi)

Population (2018)
  - Total: 278,590
  - Density: 282.4/km^{2} (731.3/sq mi)
- Time zone: UTC+8 (China standard time)
- Postal Code: 715699
- Website: http://www.baishui.gov.cn

Baishui (Chinese: 白水; pinyin: Báishuǐ) is a county of Weinan City, Shaanxi Province, China.

== Baishui County ==
Baishui County contains the following smaller divisions: Chengguan Township, Dukang Township, Xigu Township, Fenglei Township, Yaohe Township, Chengjiao Village, North Jingtou Village, Leiya Village, Leicun Village, Mengong Village, Shoushui Village, Zongzi Village, Shiguan Village, Beiyuan Village, Dayang Village, Xudao Village, Lingao Village, and Yuntai Village.

Two of Baishui's areas are well-known or of historical importance. Shiguan Village is, according to tradition, the birthplace of Cang Jie, a famed figure in ancient Chinese history who was scribe and historian for the Yellow Emperor and is credited with the creation of Chinese characters. The village's name, Shiguan 史官, means “Historian”. Dukang Township produces the "Du Kang" brand of Chinese baijiu, so named for the legendary figure Du Kang, a Xia dynasty man credited with the invention of liquor in China. Though not fully referenced in classical literature, Du Kang was famously lauded in verse by Three Kingdoms general Cao Cao: "What means can loose man's worries? He has only Du Kang..."

On Friday, November 9, 2018 at around 11:00 AM local time, a cache of around 100,000 pieces of Northern Song dynasty currency (in weight totalling 460 kilograms) was discovered at a construction site in Baishui County.

== Administrative divisions ==
As of 2019, Baishui County is divided to 1 subdistrict and 7 towns.

Subdistricts

- Chengguan Subdistrict (城关街道)

Towns

- Yaohe (尧禾镇)
- Dukang (杜康镇)
- Xigu (西固镇)
- Lingao (林皋镇)
- Shiguan (史官镇)
- Beiyuan (北塬镇)
- Leiya (雷牙镇)

== Climate ==
Climate data for Baishui, elevation 804 m (2,638 ft), (1991–2020 normals, extremes 1981–2010)
Month	Jan	Feb	Mar	Apr	May	Jun	Jul	Aug	Sep	Oct	Nov	Dec	Year
Record high °C (°F)	15.0 (59.0)	21.4 (70.5)	27.8 (82.0)	35.7 (96.3)	35.8 (96.4)	38.9 (102.0)	37.7 (99.9)	37.3 (99.1)	37.2 (99.0)	30.3 (86.5)	22.5 (72.5)	20.4 (68.7)	38.9 (102.0)
Mean daily maximum °C (°F)	3.9 (39.0)	7.8 (46.0)	13.8 (56.8)	20.6 (69.1)	25.3 (77.5)	29.5 (85.1)	30.3 (86.5)	28.6 (83.5)	23.7 (74.7)	18.0 (64.4)	11.4 (52.5)	5.4 (41.7)	18.2 (64.7)
Daily mean °C (°F)	−2.1 (28.2)	1.7 (35.1)	7.4 (45.3)	13.8 (56.8)	18.6 (65.5)	23.1 (73.6)	24.8 (76.6)	23.2 (73.8)	18.1 (64.6)	12.0 (53.6)	5.3 (41.5)	−0.6 (30.9)	12.1 (53.8)
Mean daily minimum °C (°F)	−6.3 (20.7)	−2.8 (27.0)	2.3 (36.1)	7.8 (46.0)	12.5 (54.5)	16.9 (62.4)	19.8 (67.6)	18.7 (65.7)	13.9 (57.0)	7.7 (45.9)	1.0 (33.8)	−4.7 (23.5)	7.2 (45.0)
Record low °C (°F)	−18.1 (−0.6)	−14.8 (5.4)	−10.8 (12.6)	−3.2 (26.2)	1.5 (34.7)	9.1 (48.4)	13.0 (55.4)	10.5 (50.9)	3.6 (38.5)	−4.3 (24.3)	−13.4 (7.9)	−18.4 (−1.1)	−18.4 (−1.1)
Average precipitation mm (inches)	7.1 (0.28)	10.1 (0.40)	17.5 (0.69)	31.0 (1.22)	47.1 (1.85)	62.2 (2.45)	110.0 (4.33)	97.6 (3.84)	88.5 (3.48)	45.8 (1.80)	19.0 (0.75)	4.1 (0.16)	540 (21.25)
Average precipitation days (≥ 0.1 mm)	3.4	3.9	4.8	6.9	8.5	8.6	10.9	9.9	10.1	8.7	5.0	2.8	83.5
Average snowy days	4.1	3.9	2.1	0.2	0	0	0	0	0	0.2	1.9	3.3	15.7
Average relative humidity (%)	52	54	53	55	57	59	71	75	76	72	64	55	62
Mean monthly sunshine hours	183.8	167.6	189.8	214.7	231.1	226.8	225.2	212.1	169.8	176.5	171.1	184.5	2,353
Percentage possible sunshine	59	54	51	54	53	52	51	51	46	51	56	61	53
Source: China Meteorological Administration

== Transport ==
- Xi'an–Yan'an Railway
