= Han Zhuo =

Mythical Chinese hero

- Chinese: 寒浞
Transcriptions
Standard Mandarin
- Hanyu Pinyin: Hán Zhuó
- Wade–Giles: Han Cho

Han Zhuo was a mythical Chinese hero who usurped Houyi as leader of a people near the Xia in prehistoric China. He and his sons appear in a number of Chinese legends, and there are various conflicting accounts of how he died.

== Legends ==
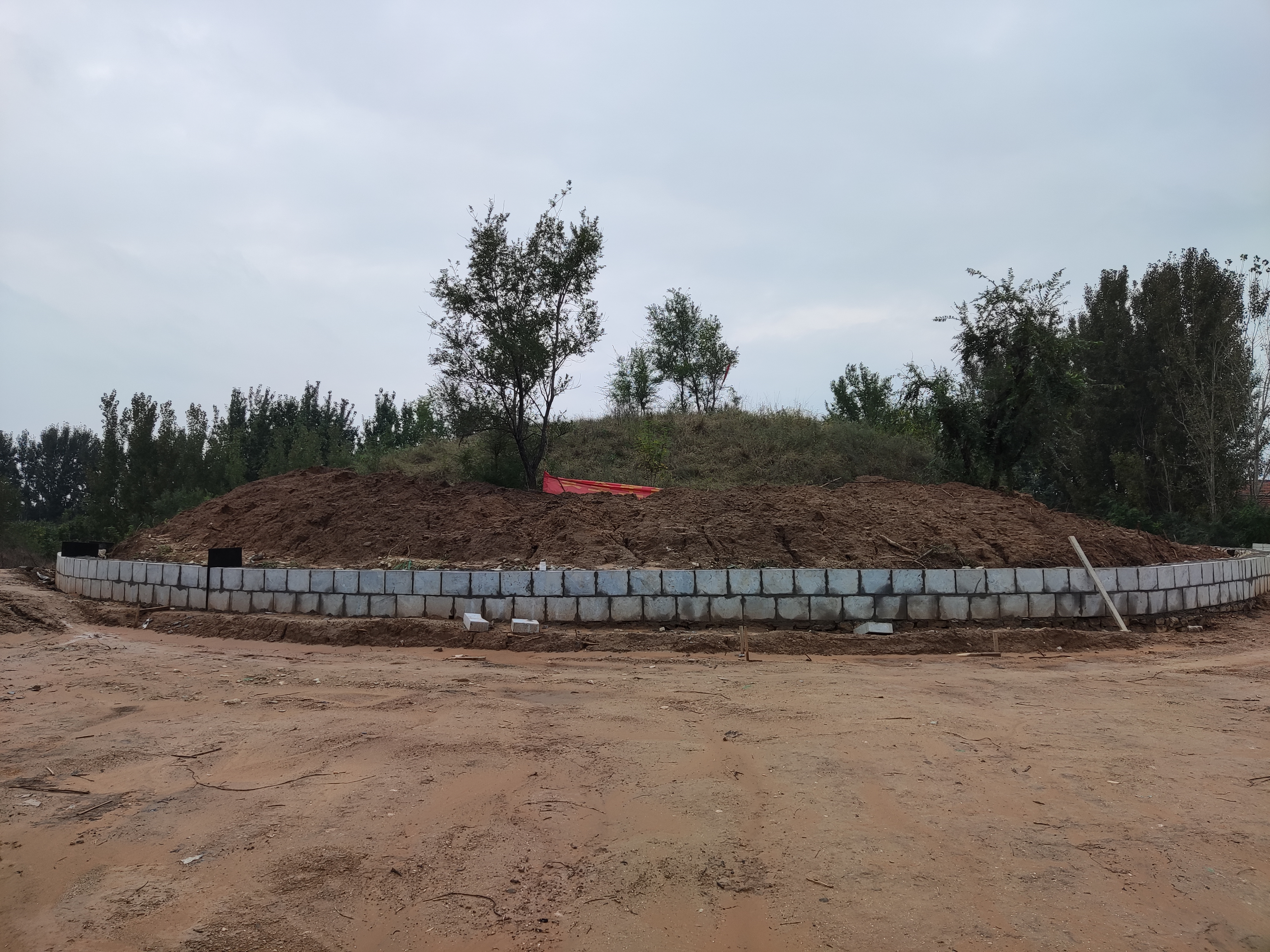
The legendary tomb of Han Zhuo, location in Hanting Subdistrict, Shandong.

Houyi was said to have saved the world from destruction by destroying nine of the ten suns which once shone over the world. Under the Shang, the Chinese week was divided into ten days, each honoring particular royal ancestors and each regarded as having a separate sun shining in turn. He was said to have become a tyrant after his wife Chang'e stole his elixir of immortality and ascended to the moon. Separately, he appeared as a historical figure in records such as the Bamboo Annals, where he conquered the Xia capital Zhenxun during the early years of the reign of King Taikang. Han Zhuo was originally from the state of Hai. He was a relative or "minor functionary" of Bo Ming (伯明), lord of Han, but was dismissed. (Note: The Zuo Zhuan, translated in Selby.)

He joined Houyi's court and ingratiated himself to its ladies. Liberal in his gifts and unwilling to do the daily drudgework of rule, Houyi entrusted him with greater and greater responsibility while he focused on his archery. Ultimately, Han Zhuo became Houyi's "chancellor" and performed most of the duties of government. He is said to have usurped Houyi during the 8th year of the reign of Taikang's nephew Xiang of Xia at the instigation of Houyi's wife. In one account, the pair waylaid him as he was returning from a hunt; in another, Han Zhuo bludgeoned him to death with help from Xuan Qi; in another, he was waylaid by his own retainers led by his closest pupil Pangmeng (蠭蒙); (Note: According to Zhu Xi, related in Selby.) in a fourth, he talked the palace staff into turning on the king and killing him. Houyi's body was prepared as a meal for his son or sons, who refused to eat it and were killed. Their bodies were displayed at the gates of Qiong (窮). Houyi's wife Chun Hu (純狐 lit. "Sable/Pure Fox"; aka Xuan Qi 眩妻 "Dark Lady"), Han Zhuo's co-conspirator, then became Han Zhuo's consort and bore him two sons, Ao (奡, Ào) or Jiao (澆, Jiāo) and Yi (豷).

As ruler, Han Zhuo conquered two other states but their refugees gathered with the Ge (鬲, Gé) under a man named Mi who fought for the cause of Shao Kang. Mi who claimed to be the long-lost son of the deposed king Xiang and his escaped wife Min.

In some accounts, Han Zhuo was killed by a Kuei minister while in battle with the Xia refugees. In other accounts, he committed suicide, after which Shao Kang restored the Xia dynasty. In others, he was first succeeded by his son Ao, remembered as a strongman and revered as the "Arrogant King", a culture hero credited with the invention of ships and numbered among the Kings of the Water Immortals. Han Jiao was killed by Xiang's son King Shaokang.
