= Hou Yi =

Chinese mythological archer

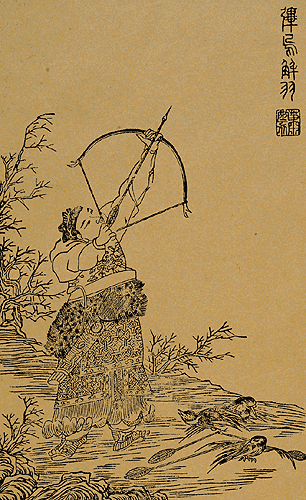
- Houyi, as depicted in Xiao Yuncong's Illustrated 'Inquiry of the Heavens' (蕭雲從天問圖), published 1645
- Chinese: 后羿
Transcriptions
Standard Mandarin
- Hanyu Pinyin: Hòu Yì
- Wade–Giles: Hou^{4}-i^{4}
- IPA: [xôʊ.î]
Yue: Cantonese
- Jyutping: hau^{6} ngai^{6}
Southern Min
- Hokkien POJ: Hō͘-gē
Middle Chinese
- Middle Chinese: /ɦəu^{X} ŋei^{H}/
Old Chinese
- Zhengzhang: /*ɡoːʔ ŋeːs/

Hou Yi (Chinese: 后羿) is a mythological Chinese archer. He was also known as Shen Yi and simply as Yi (羿). He is also typically given the title of "Lord Archer". He is sometimes portrayed as a god of archery or a xian descended from heaven to aid humankind. Other times, he is portrayed as either simply half-divine or fully mortal. His wife, Chang'e, is one of the lunar deities.

== Lore ==
In Chinese mythology, there were originally 10 suns; in some forms of this myth they are the sons or grandsons of the Jade Emperor. Initially, the 10 suns would cross the sky one by one, but one day the 10 suns decided to come out all at once so that they could play with each other, and scorched the earth. Hou Yi was tasked by the mythical Emperor Yao—in some versions, the Jade Emperor—to rein in the suns. Hou Yi first tried to reason with the suns. When that did not work, he then pretended to shoot at them with his bow to intimidate them. When the suns again refused to heed Hou Yi's warnings, he began to shoot at them one by one. As each one fell, they turned into three-legged crows. Finally, only one sun was left. Emperor Yao and the sun's mother Xihe asked for him to be spared for the prosperity of man. In other variants, Hou Yi's final arrow was stolen, either by a brave boy or by Emperor Yao himself, who realized that the land requires a sun.

Hou Yi was also known for the slaying, maiming and imprisonment of several other mythical beasts such as the Yayu, Zaochi, Jiuying, Dafeng, Fengxi, and Xiushe. He had been directed by King Yao to go after these creatures as they were all causing trouble for humans.

Hou Yi was gifted the pill of immortality by the gods. One of Hou Yi's apprentices called Feng Meng broke into Hou Yi's house in search of the pill of immortality while Hou Yi was out hunting. His wife Chang'e swallowed the pill before Feng Meng could get it. After eating the pill, Chang'e became immortal and flew to the moon.

In another version, after Hou Yi shot down the suns, he was proclaimed as a hero-king by the people. However, once he was crowned king, he became a tyrant and subjugated his people. Hou Yi had also obtained an immortality elixir from Xiwangmu to live forever. Chang'e was afraid that if he lived forever, that people would forever be victim to his cruelty. Therefore, Chang'e consumed the elixir herself and floated away. As she did, Hou Yi tried to shoot her down but failed. For her sacrifice, people have taken to honoring her during the Mid-Autumn Festival.

The Heavenly Questions section of the anthology Chu Ci recorded: "The Emperor sent Hou Yi to reform the people of Xia. Why did he shoot Hebo and take his wife Luoshen?" The poem tells the story of Hou Yi, who was sent by the Emperor to reform the people of Xia. He was a skilled archer and hunter, and he used his skills to rid the world of many monsters and pests. However, he also became arrogant and tyrannical, and he eventually killed Hebo, the god of Yellow River and took his wife Luoshen as his own.

== Historical references ==
Hou Yi was also depicted as a tribal leader of ancient China in classical sources, usually conflated with the legendary figure. According to the Bamboo Annals, Hou Yi attacked the Xia dynasty during the first year of King Taikang's reign, occupying the Xia capital Zhenxun while Taikang was hunting beyond the Luo River. In the eighth year of the reign of Taikang's nephew Xiang of Xia, Hou Yi was deposed by his lieutenant Han Zhuo. Recent research suggests the legend of Hou Yi shooting 10 suns (十日) originated with a miswriting of Hou Yi shooting Xiang (相).

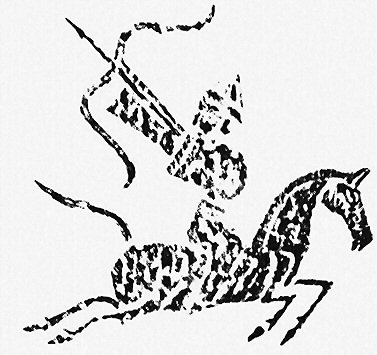
Relief rubbing of Houyi

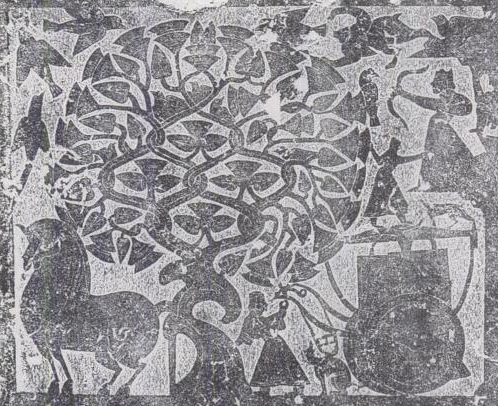
Houyi takes aim at the Suns (right upper corner), rubbing from the Wu Liang Shrines reliefs

== See also ==
- Mid-Autumn Festival for variants of this legend
- Korean creation narratives
- Pixiu
- Tiangou
