= Duke Kang =

Duke Kang may refer to these ancient Chinese rulers:

- Duke of Shao (died c. 1000 BC)
- Duke Kang of Qin (died 609 BC)
- Duke Kang of Qi (died 379 BC)

== See also ==
- King Kang (disambiguation)
