= Zhong Kang =

Zhong Kang 仲康
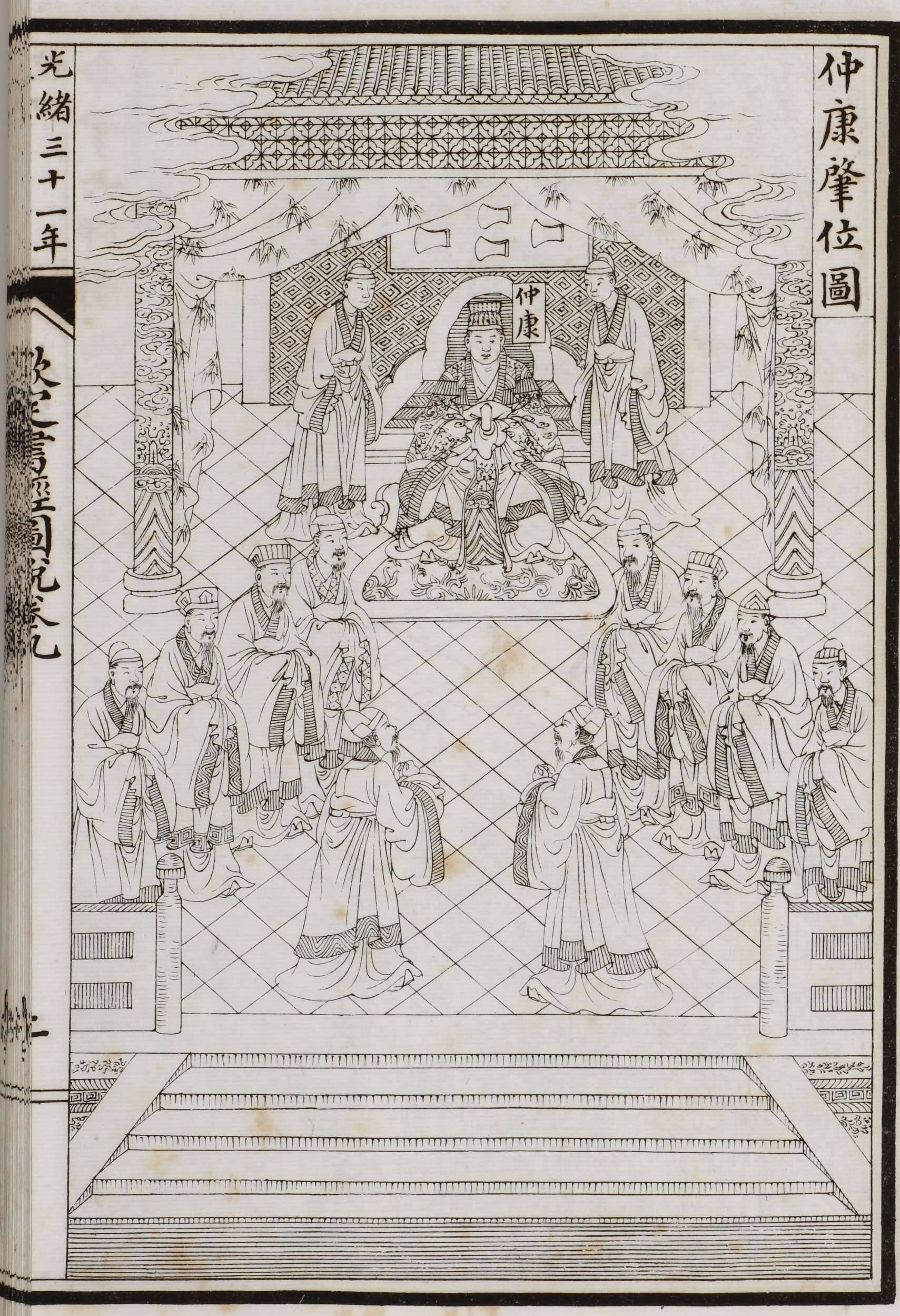

King of the Xia dynasty
- Predecessor: Tai Kang
- Successor: Xiang
- Dynasty: Xia dynasty
- Father: Qi of Xia

Zhong Kang (Chinese: 仲康; pinyin: Zhòng Kāng; Wade–Giles: Chung-k'ang) was the fourth sovereign of the Xia dynasty, the first dynasty in traditional Chinese history.

== Family ==
Zhong Kang was a son of king Qi of Xia and thus the younger brother of Tai Kang. He was the father of Xiang of Xia.

== Reign ==
According to the Bamboo Annals, Zhong Kang took the throne in the year of Jichou (己丑). His capital was at Zhenxun.

On the day of gengwu (庚戌), the 9th month in the 5th year of his reign, there was a solar eclipse. Since the royal astronomers at that time were licentious and drunk, they failed to predict this eclipse, resulting in confusion and panic among the common people. Zhong Kang sent the nobleman Yin to punish the Ministers of Astronomy for thus neglecting their duties. This is described more fully in the document known as the Punitive Expedition of Yin (胤征) in the Book of Documents. In the Bamboo Annals, this was reflected as nobleman Yin conquering Xihe, which is the god of astronomy.

In the 6th year of Zhong Kang's reign, he appointed the prince of Kunwu (昆吾) as his prime minister.

In his 7th year he died, and his son, named Xiang, declared a new capital at Shangqiu, supported by the prince of Pi (邳).

== See also ==
- List of Chinese monarchs

== Sources ==
Zhong Kang Xia dynasty
Regnal titles
Preceded by Tai Kang	King of China; 2088 BC – 2075 BC	Succeeded by Xiang
