= Xiang of Xia =

Xiang 相

King of the Xia dynasty
- Predecessor: Zhong Kang
- Successor: Shao Kang
- Spouse: Ji
- Issue: Shao Kang
- Father: Zhong Kang

Xiang (Chinese: 相; pinyin: Xiāng; Wade–Giles: Hsiang) was the fifth sovereign of the semi-legendary Chinese Xia dynasty who is said to have reigned during the 3rd millennium BC. He was the fifth king of the Xia dynasty.

== Life ==
Xiang was preceded on the throne of Xia by his father Zhong Kang, and before that by his uncle Tai Kang.

=== Reign according to the Bamboo Annals ===
Xiang ascended the throne in the year of Wuxu and set his capital in Shangqiu.

In the first year of his reign, he sent troops against the Huai Barbarians and Fei Barbarians (畎夷, aka Quanyi). In the third year, he sent troops to the Feng Barbarians and Huang Barbarians.

In his 7th year, "the hordes of Yu came to make their submission", while in the 8th year, the warlord Han Zhuo killed Hou Yi. Han Zhuo also sent his son Jiao against Ge.

In his 9th year, Xiang moved his court to Zhenguan.

In the 15th year, Xiang's vassal, Xiangtu duke of Shang, "prepared carriages and horses, and removed to Shangqiu".

In the 20th year, Han Zhuo conquered Ge. In the 26th year, Han Zhuo ordered his son Jiao to fight in Zhenguan. In the 27th year of Xiang's reign, Jiao attacked Xia at Wei in Zhenxun.

=== 28th year of reign ===
In the 28th year of Xiang's reign, Han Zhuo ordered his son Jiao to kill King Xiang. At that time, Xiang's wife, Queen Ji was pregnant. She escaped and hid in Youren. Prime minister Mi fled to Youge. Later, Ji gave birth to a boy named Shao Kang.

19 years later, Shao Kang, heir to the throne, went from Youren to Yu. In the following years, Shao Kang and Mi led the forces of Zhenxun and Zhenguan to fight against the renegade Han Zhuo. Shao Kang sent Ru Ai to fight Jiao in Guo, and Jiao was killed. He also sent his son Zishu to recover Ge. Finally, forty years after Xiang's death, Mi executed Han Zhuo.

Shao Kang returned in triumph to the capital and took the throne, while the former Xia vassals came to do homage.

== See also ==
- List of Chinese monarchs

Xiang of Xia Xia dynasty
Regnal titles
Preceded by Zhong Kang	King of China; 2075 BC – 2047 BC	Succeeded by Shao Kang
