= Zhu of Xia =

7th ruler of the Xia dynasty

Zhu 杼

7th King of the Xia dynasty
- Predecessor: Shao Kang
- Successor: Huai
- Issue: Huai
- Dynasty: Xia dynasty
- Father: Shao Kang
- Mother: A daughter of Yu Si

Zhu (Chinese: 杼; pinyin: Zhù; Wade–Giles: Chu, also 予, 宁, 佇, or 宇) was the seventh sovereign of the semi-legendary Xia dynasty (c. 2070–1600 BCE) of Ancient China. Along with the reign of his father Shao Kang, Zhu's rule was considered a peaceful and prosperous period of the Xia's history.

== Background ==
The Xia dynasty (夏朝; c. 2070–1600 BCE) is the first dynasty of traditional Chinese historiography. Founded by Yu the Great, both the dynasty and its rulers are of highly uncertain and controversial historicity.

There is some uncertainty as to the correct character for Zhu's name. Some sources refer to him as Yu (予). According to Sima Zhen, his named is read "Zhù".

== Traditional narrative ==
Extant sources offer little information on Zhu's reign. He was the son of Shao Kang. According to the Zuo Zhuan, Shao Kang's wife—and presumably Zhu's mother—was a daughter of Yu Si, a descendant of the legendary Yu dynasty. Shao Kang had been born during an interregnum in the Xia's history, when the region was ruled by the usurper Han Zhuo. During Shao Kang's attack to restore the throne, the Zuo Zhuan described Zhu as commanding a "diversionary force" at the rear. Towards his reign's end, Shao Kang enfeoffed his son Wuyu with a fief near Kuaiji; the sinologist Wu Kuo-Chen speculates that a rivalry from Wuyu living under the heir Zhu "might have grown into bickering that could be resolved only by this settlement".

The Bamboo Annals gives a brief account of Zhu's reign. He ascended in the year of the ji si (己巳) and resided in Yuan (原; now Jiyuan), moving the capital to Laoqiu (老丘; now Kaifeng) after five years. During his reign's eighth year Zhu undertook a punitive expedition in the East China Sea, conquering as far as Sanshou. While hunting amid the exhibition, Zhu killed a nine-tailed fox. In the thirteenth year his Shang vassal Ming died at He. He died in the seventeenth year of his reign and was succeeded by his son Huai.

Traditional accounts are generally interpreted as indicating the reigns of Shao Kang and Zhu as a "period of union and tranquillity". Amid the renewed peace and conquering of Eastern peoples, Zhu's reign has been described as "the most powerful and prosperous period of the Xia dynasty." The Guoyu describes Zhu as following Yu the Great's example, a "further indication that this is in some sense a new beginning".

== Chronology ==
Zhu is traditionally held to have succeeded his father Shao Kang and been succeeded by his son Huai. Aside from this, all reign periods and lengths are speculative and unverifiable.

Differing reign lengths of Zhu (BCE)
Source	Length	Speculative Years
Traditional	16	2057–2041
Bamboo Annals	17	1851–1868

Zhu of Xia Xia dynasty
Regnal titles
Preceded by Shao Kang	King of China	Succeeded by Huai
