= Former capitals of Chinese provinces =

This is a list of the current and former capitals of the subdivisions of China since the Yuan dynasty. The history of China and its administrative divisions is long and convoluted. Provinces (shěng 省) were first created during the Yuan dynasty. Years may not line up perfectly during periods of turmoil (e.g. at the end of each dynasty).

The list includes current and former provinces, as well as other first-level administrative units that have been used over the course of China's recent history, such as autonomous regions, military command zones during the Qing dynasty, and so forth. Unless otherwise specified, a given administrative unit can be assumed to be a province with its present name. Historical names of provinces and entities that are not provinces will be specified as they arise.

Excluded from the list:

- units below the first level;
- Direct-controlled municipalities of China and special administrative regions;
- subnational entities of short-lived regimes, such as the Taiping Heavenly Kingdom, the Chinese Soviet Republic, Manchukuo, Mengjiang, Wang Jingwei Government, etc. This is because their provinces were usually transitory in existence and tended to be smaller than usual.

Many of the capitals given in this chart have had multiple historical names during different dynasties. In some cases, different names were used concurrently for the same city. This chart gives only the modern names for the sake of simplicity.

For the sake of simplicity, the chart will not attempt to be exhaustive in its descriptions of border changes.

National entities since 1279:

Year	1271–1368	1368–1644	1644–1912	1912–1949	1949–present
Government	Yuan dynasty	Ming dynasty	Qing dynasty	Republic of China (on Mainland China)	People's Republic of China (on Mainland China) and Republic of China (on Taiwan Island)

List of capitals:

Province (or equivalent)	Capital	When	Remarks
Anhui	During the Yuan dynasty, modern Anhui was split between the Secretariat (中書省) of the central government, the province of Jianghuai, and (from 1291) the province of Henanjiangbei.		
Anhui	N/A	1366–1644	As part of Zhili up to 1421; as part of Nanzhili after 1421. Administered directly by the central government, instead of a province.
Anhui	N/A	1645–1661	Part of Jiangnan Province, formed out of former Nanzhili in 1645. Split into Jiangsu and Anhui in 1661.
Anhui	Nanjing	1661–1760	Nanjing is now the capital of neighbouring Jiangsu province.
Anhui	Anqing	1760–1853	
Anhui	Hefei	1853–1862	During the Taiping Rebellion.
Anhui	Anqing	1862–1946	
Anhui	Hefei	1946–1949	
Anhui	Hefei (north)	1949–1952	As North Anhui and South Anhui administrative regions.
Anhui	Wuhu (south)	1949–1952	As North Anhui and South Anhui administrative regions.
Anhui	Hefei	1952–present	
Fujian	Fuzhou, Quanzhou	1278–1299	Between 1278 and 1299, separate provinces in the Fujian area were repeatedly split out and remerged back into Jiangzhe Province.
Fujian	N/A	1299–1356	Part of Jiangzhe Province until Fujian Province was split out of it.
Fujian	Fuzhou	1356–1938	
Fujian	Yong'an	1938–1945	During the Second Sino-Japanese War
Fujian	Fuzhou	1945–present	In 1949, the PRC created the "Fujian Provincial People's Government". The ROC's "Fujian Provincial Government" moved to Kinmen.
Fujian	Kinmen (ROC)	1949–1956	After the ROC's relocation to Taiwan.
Fujian	Hsintien (ROC)	1956–1996	In Taiwan Province, ROC enforced military governance in Kinmen and Matsu
Fujian	Kinmen (ROC)	1996–2018	Demilitarized
Fujian	N/A (ROC)	2019–present	Fujian Provincial Government defunct
Gansu	Zhangye	1286–1368	
Gansu	N/A	1368–1667	Part of Shaanxi Province.
Gansu	Lanzhou	1667–present	Gansu was called Gongchang 1667–1670.
Guangdong	Before 1369, modern Guangdong was split between the provinces of Jiangxi, Huguang, and (from 1364) Guangxi.		
Guangdong	Guangzhou	1369–present	Included modern Hainan until 1988.
Guangxi	Mostly found within Huguang Province before 1364.		
Guangxi	Guilin	1364–1912	Included parts of modern Guangdong until 1369.
Guangxi	Nanning	1912–1936	
Guangxi	Guilin	1936–1950	
Guangxi	Nanning	1950–present	Guangxi Province became Guangxi Zhuang Autonomous Region in 1958.
Guizhou	Mostly found within the provinces of Huguang, Sichuan, and Yunnan before 1413.		
Guizhou	Guiyang	1413–present	
Hainan	Part of Huguang before 1364; part of Guangxi from 1364 to 1369; part of Guangdong after 1369.		
Hainan	N/A	1369–1988	Part of Guangdong Province.
Hainan	Haikou	1988–present	
Hebei	Administered by the Secretariat (中書省) of the central government before 1368. Briefly split between Henan and Shandong provinces, 1368–1369.		
Hebei	Beiping	1369–1421	As Beiping Province.
Hebei	N/A	1421–1669	As Beizhili up to 1645; as Zhili after 1645. Administered directly by the central government, instead of a province.
Hebei	Baoding	1669–1902	As "Zhili". Converted into a province in 1911 as "Zhili Province"
Hebei	Tianjin	1902–1928	As "Zhili". Converted into a province in 1911 as "Zhili Province"
Hebei	Beiping	1928–1930	
Hebei	Tianjin	1930–1935	
Hebei	Baoding	1935–1958	
Hebei	Tianjin	1958–1966	
Hebei	Baoding	1966–1968	
Hebei	Shijiazhuang	1968–present	
Heilongjiang	N/A	1264–1368	Part of Liaoyang Province. "Liaoyang" was the final name of the province after several changes between 1264 and 1287.
Heilongjiang	Mongols, Manchus, and Ming China military garrisons in the area during the Ming dynasty.		
Heilongjiang	Aigun	1683–1690	Area of control of the General of Heilongjiang. Became Heilongjiang Province in 1907.
Heilongjiang	Nenjiang	1690–1699	Area of control of the General of Heilongjiang. Became Heilongjiang Province in 1907.
Heilongjiang	Qiqihar	1699–1907	Area of control of the General of Heilongjiang. Became Heilongjiang Province in 1907.
Heilongjiang	Qiqihar	1907–1931	
Heilongjiang	N/A	1931–1945	Part of Manchukuo.
Heilongjiang	Bei'an	1945–1949	As Heilongjiang Province (northwestern part of modern Heilongjiang)
Heilongjiang	Jiamusi	1945–1949	As Hejiang Province (northeastern part of modern Heilongjiang)
Heilongjiang	Qiqihar	1945–1949	As Nenjiang Province (southwestern part of modern Heilongjiang)
Heilongjiang	Mudanjiang	1945–1949	As Songjiang Province (southeastern part of modern Heilongjiang)
Heilongjiang	Qiqihar	1949–1954	As Heilongjiang Province (western part of modern Heilongjiang)
Heilongjiang	Harbin	1949–1954	As Songjiang Province (eastern part of modern Heilongjiang)
Heilongjiang	Harbin	1954–present	New Heilongjiang formed from Songjiang + old Heilongjiang in 1954
Henan	Administered by the Secretariat (中書省) of the central government for the most part before 1291.		
Henan	Kaifeng	1291–1954	Initially as Henanjiangbei Province, which included parts of modern Jiangsu, Anhui, and Hubei provinces. Given approximately modern borders and modern name in 1368.
Henan	Zhengzhou	1954–present	
Hubei	During the Yuan dynasty, modern Hubei was split between the provinces of Huguang, (from 1291) Henanjiangbei, and Sichuan.		
Hubei	N/A	1277–1664	Part of Huguang Province.
Hubei	Wuchang	1664–1927	
Hubei	Wuhan	1927–present	Wuhan is the amalgamation of Wuchang, Hankou, and Hanyang.
Hunan	N/A	1277–1664	Part of Huguang Province.
Hunan	Changsha	1664–present	
Inner Mongolia	See the history section of Inner Mongolia for the administrative entities of that region before 1947.		
Inner Mongolia	Ulaanhot	1947–1950	As Inner Mongolia Autonomous Region.
Inner Mongolia	Hohhot	1950–present	As Inner Mongolia Autonomous Region.
Jiangsu	Before 1356, modern Jiangsu was split between the Secretariat (中書省) of the central government, the province of Jianghuai (from 1289), Jiangzhe (from 1291), the province of Henanjiangbei, and (from 1354) the province of Huainanjiangbei.		
Jiangsu	N/A	1366–1644	As part of Zhili up to 1421; as part of Nanzhili after 1421. Administered directly by the central government, instead of a province.
Jiangsu	N/A	1645–1661	Part of Jiangnan Province, formed out of former Nanzhili in 1645. Split into Jiangsu and Anhui in 1661.
Jiangsu	Nanjing, Suzhou	1661–1912?	
Jiangsu	Nanjing	1912?–1928	
Jiangsu	Zhenjiang	1928–1949	
Jiangsu	Shengsi County (ROC)	1949–1950	Following the fall of Nanjing to the communists, the "Jiangsu Provincial People's Government" was formed; Jiangsu Provincial Government moved to Shengsi County in Zhejiang.
Jiangsu	Yangzhou (north)	1949–1952	As North Jiangsu and South Jiangsu administrative regions.
Jiangsu	Wuxi (south)	1949–1952	As North Jiangsu and South Jiangsu administrative regions.
Jiangsu	N/A (ROC)	1950–present	Jiangsu Provincial Government defunct
Jiangsu	Nanjing	1952–present	
Jiangxi	Nanchang	1277–present	Included parts of modern Guangdong until 1369.
Jiangxi	Gan County (ROC)	1949	The communists captured Nanchang on May 22, establishing the "Jiangxi Provincial People's Government". Government moved to Gan County
Jiangxi	Taichung (ROC)	1949	Provincial seat moved to Taichung City in Taiwan Province after Gan County was captured.
Jiangxi	N/A (ROC)	1949–present	Jiangxi Provincial Government defunct
Jilin	N/A	1264–1368	Part of Liaoyang Province. "Liaoyang" was the final name of the province after several changes between 1264 and 1287.
Jilin	Mongols, Manchus, and Ming China military garrisons in the area during the Ming dynasty.		
Jilin	Ningguta	1662–1757	Area of control of the General of Ningguta (up to 1757) or the General of Jilin (from 1757). Became Jilin Province in 1907.
Jilin	Jilin City	1757–1907	Area of control of the General of Ningguta (up to 1757) or the General of Jilin (from 1757). Became Jilin Province in 1907.
Jilin	Jilin City	1907–1931	
Jilin	N/A	1931–1945	Part of Manchukuo.
Jilin	Jilin City	1945–1954	
Jilin	Changchun	1954–present	
Liaoning	N/A	1264–1368	Part of Liaoyang Province. "Liaoyang" was the final name of the province after several changes between 1264 and 1287.
Liaoning	Partially under Shandong province during the Ming dynasty, until Manchu conquest c. 1618.		
Liaoning	Shenyang	1662–1907	Area of control of the General of Shengjing. Became Fengtian Province in 1907.
Liaoning	Shenyang	1907–1931	Fengtian Province from 1907 to 1929; Liaoning Province from 1929 onwards.
Liaoning	N/A	1931–1945	Part of Manchukuo.
Liaoning	Shenyang	1945–1949	As Liaoning Province (central part of modern Liaoning)
Liaoning	Tonghua	1945–1949	As Andong Province (eastern part of modern Liaoning; southern part of modern Jilin)
Liaoning	Liaoyuan	1945–1949	As Liaobei Province (northern part of modern Liaoning; western part of modern Jilin)
Liaoning	Jinzhou	1949–1954	As Liaoxi Province (western part of modern Liaoning)
Liaoning	Dandong	1949–1954	As Liaodong Province (eastern part of modern Liaoning; southern part of modern Jilin). Dandong was then known as "Andong"
Liaoning	Shenyang	1954–present	
Ningxia	Mostly part of Gansu Province (up to c. 1370); part of Shaanxi Province (up to 1667); part of Gansu Province (1667 onwards)		
Ningxia	Yinchuan	1928–1954	Ningxia Province split out of Gansu in 1928.
Ningxia	N/A	1954–1958	Part of Gansu Province.
Ningxia	Yinchuan	1958–present	Ningxia Hui Autonomous Region split out of Gansu in 1958.
Qinghai	Historically Oyirad Mongols in the north, Amdo and Kham Tibetans in the south. Overseen by commissioner stationed at Xining (then part of Gansu Province) during Qing dynasty, early Republic of China (up to 1928).See History section of Qinghai.		
Qinghai	Xining	1928–present	
Shaanxi	Xi'an	1286–present	From 1260 to 1286, Shaanxi Province (and in some cases, a combined Shaanxi-Sichuan Province) was established and disbanded several times. Included modern Gansu and Ningxia until 1667.
Shandong	Administered by the Secretariat (中書省) of the central government before c. 1357.		
Shandong	Qingzhou	1357?–1377?	
Shandong	Jinan	1377–present	
Shanxi	Administered by the Secretariat (中書省) of the central government before 1368.		
Shanxi	Taiyuan	1369–present	
Sichuan	Chengdu	1286–1287	From 1260 to 1286, Sichuan Province (and in some cases, a combined Shaanxi-Sichuan Province) was established and disbanded several times.
Sichuan	Chongqing	1287–1289	
Sichuan	Chengdu	1289–1646	
Sichuan	Langzhong	1646–1665	
Sichuan	Chengdu	1665–1949	
Sichuan	Nanchong (north)	1949–1952	As North Sichuan, South Sichuan, East Sichuan and West Sichuan administrative regions.
Sichuan	Luzhou (south)	1949–1952	As North Sichuan, South Sichuan, East Sichuan and West Sichuan administrative regions.
Sichuan	Chongqing (east)	1949–1952	As North Sichuan, South Sichuan, East Sichuan and West Sichuan administrative regions.
Sichuan	Chengdu (west)	1949–1952	As North Sichuan, South Sichuan, East Sichuan and West Sichuan administrative regions.
Sichuan	Chengdu	1952–present	
Taiwan	Formosan people lived in the area before 1624; European colonization from 1624 to 1661; Kingdom of Tungning from 1661 to 1683. See History of Taiwan.		
Taiwan	N/A	1683–1887	Part of Fujian Province.
Taiwan	Taiwan-fu	1887–1894	Planned, around today's Taichung
Taiwan	Taipei	1887–1956	De facto until 1894; official after 1894
Taiwan	Zhongxing New Village	1956–2018	In Nantou City
Taiwan	—N/a	2018–present	Taiwan Provincial Government defunct
Tibet	Part of Yuan dynasty up to fourteenth century; struggle between Sakyapa, Kagyüpa, later Gelukpa schools of Tibetan Buddhism up to seventeenth century, when Gelukpa became dominant.		
Tibet	Lhasa	(1720s)–present	The Dalai Lamas (Gelukpa school) ruled over Ü-Tsang (or more) from Lhasa from 1642 onwards. Qing China began to assert control over Tibet in the 1720s until its fall in 1912; from 1912 to 1951, Tibet was self-ruling but was recognized internationally as a part of China. Planning Committee for Tibet Autonomous Region (TAR) from 1955 to 1965; TAR established in 1965.
Xinjiang	Ruled by Chagatai Khanate from thirteenth to fifteenth century; fragmented until eighteenth century when Qing China conquered the region. See History section of Xinjiang.		
Xinjiang	Yining	1762–1888	General of Ili, based in Yining, held administrative powers until 1888; central control lapsed during Yakub Beg's revolt from 1865, until his forces were defeated in 1881.
Xinjiang	Ürümqi	1884–present	Xinjiang Province until 1955; Xinjiang Uyghur Autonomous Region from 1955.
Xinjiang	Taipei	1949–1992	After the ROC relocated to Taiwan. Government abolished in 1992.
Yunnan	Kunming	1275–present	Included parts of morden Sichuan and Guizhou until Ming dynasty.
Zhejiang	N/A	1289–1367	Part of Jiangzhe Province.
Zhejiang	Hangzhou	1367–present	
Chahar	See Inner Mongolia for history before 1914.		
Chahar	Zhangjiakou	1914–1937	Chahar Special Administrative Region until 1928; province from 1928.
Chahar	N/A	1937–1945	Part of Mengjiang.
Chahar	Zhangjiakou	1945–1952	Disbanded in 1952, distributed into Hebei Province, Shanxi Province.
Huainanjiangbei	Tianchang	1354–1364?	Established out of Henanjiangbei; disappeared with end of Yuan dynasty (c. 1368). Found mainly in modern Jiangsu province.
Huguang	Changsha	1277–1281	
Huguang	Wuchang	1281–1664	Included modern Guangxi, Hainan, and parts modern Guangdong until 1364, included parts of modern Guizhou until 1413. Split into Hubei and Hunan provinces in 1664
Jiangnan	Nanjing	1645–1661	Converted from the directly administered Nanzhili region in 1645; split into Jiangsu and Anhui provinces in 1661. See also remarks at Jiangsu and Anhui entries.
Jiangzhe	Hangzhou	1289–1367?	A province was established in the region in 1276; its seat was moved around and it was renamed several times, until settling upon Jiangzhe Province with seat at Hangzhou in 1289. Split into Zhejiang and Fujian Provinces by Ming dynasty.
Jiaodong	Laiyang	1364–1368?	Established in the Shandong Peninsula; does not appear to have outlasted the end of the Yuan dynasty.
Liaoyang	Liaoyang	1264–1368?	"Liaoyang" was the final name of the province after several changes between 1264 and 1287. Lasted until the end of Yuan dynasty (c. 1368); found today mostly in Liaoning, Jilin, Heilongjiang.
Pingyuan	Xinxiang	1949–1952	Split out of Hebei, Shandong, and Henan provinces in 1949; distributed into Henan and Shandong provinces in 1952.
Rehe	See Inner Mongolia for history before 1914.		
Rehe	Chengde	1914–1933	Rehe Special Administrative Region until 1928; province from 1928.
Rehe	N/A	1933–1945	Part of Manchukuo.
Rehe	Chengde	1945–1955	Disbanded in 1955, different parts were merged into Hebei Province, Liaoning Province, and Inner Mongolia Autonomous Region.
Suiyuan	See Inner Mongolia for history before 1914.		
Suiyuan	Hohhot	1914–1937	Suiyuan Special Administrative Region until 1928; province from 1928.
Suiyuan	N/A	1937–1945	Part of Mengjiang.
Suiyuan	Hohhot	1945–1954	Merged into Inner Mongolia Autonomous Region in 1954.
Xikang	Kangding	1914–1950	Chuanbian Special Region created in 1914, from western Sichuan and territory formerly ruled from Lhasa; it is roughly equivalent to southern Kham and southern Amdo. Converted into Xikang Province (established in 1939); merged into Sichuan province in 1955. See also remarks at entries for Tibet and Sichuan.
Xikang	Ya'an	1950–1955	Chuanbian Special Region created in 1914, from western Sichuan and territory formerly ruled from Lhasa; it is roughly equivalent to southern Kham and southern Amdo. Converted into Xikang Province (established in 1939); merged into Sichuan province in 1955. See also remarks at entries for Tibet and Sichuan.
Xing'an	Hailar	1945–1947?	After the end of Manchukuo at the end of World War II, Xing'an Province was created from the northwestern part of Manchuria, which was administered by Heilongjiang province before the war. The region was superseded by Inner Mongolia Autonomous Region.
Zhili; Beizhili; Nanzhili	Regions directly administered by the central government, not part of any province. "Zhili" (modern Jiangsu and Anhui) from 1366 to 1421; "Beizhili" (modern Hebei) and "Nanzhili" (modern Jiangsu, Anhui) from 1421 to 1645; "Zhili" (modern Hebei) from 1645 to 1669. Name kept for "Zhili Province" (modern Hebei) from 1669 to 1927. See also remarks at Hebei, Jiangsu, and Anhui entries.		

== See also ==
- Historical capitals of China
- List of capitals in China
- The Historical Atlas of China
