= Feng Meng =

Figure from Chinese mythology

Feng Meng/Beng Meng (Peng Meng), or Fengmeng (Chinese: 逢蒙; pinyin: féng/péng méng; Wade–Giles: feng²/peng² meng²), was a figure from Chinese mythology closely associated with the divine archer Houyi. He was the apprentice of the divine archer and was envious of his skill with the bow and arrow. In a fit of envy and anger, Feng Meng murdered Yi with a club made from a peach tree.

== Role in mythology ==
After Houyi’s wife, Chang'e consumed the elixir of immortality, Houyi realized that he would never again be immortal and would soon die. He resolved to pass his knowledge and skills of archery and hunting to the next generation to ensure that they would live on after his death. In order to do so, he decided to take an apprentice, Feng Meng; this apprentice soon became an expert archer. But even so, he was still envious of Houyi's superior abilities, especially after a fateful archery competition in which Houyi killed as many geese as Feng Meng did with his archery despite having a far more difficult target. Feng Meng made multiple attempts on his old master's life; tried to ambush him with his bow and arrow only for Houyi to stop his arrows with a return volley. Finally, Feng Meng resorted to the use of a club made from the wood of a peach tree to bludgeon his master to death.

Other stories are told of Feng Meng, set in times previous to or after this fateful event. In one telling, told during the Chinese 'Mooncake Festival' or Mid-Autumn Festival, Feng Meng (rendered in this translation as Peng Meng), was the cause of Chang'e's fateful decision to consume the elixir of immortality herself instead of sharing it with him. In this telling, Feng Meng attempted to steal the elixir of immortality from Chang'e by force while Houyi was out. As she realized that she could not defeat him, Chang'e escaped the only way she could—by consuming the elixir of immortality and ascending to the heavens where he could not reach her.
