= Du Kang =

Inventor of fermented drink in Chinese legend

- Chinese: 杜康
Transcriptions
Standard Mandarin
- Hanyu Pinyin: Dù Kāng
- Wade–Giles: Tu-k‘ang

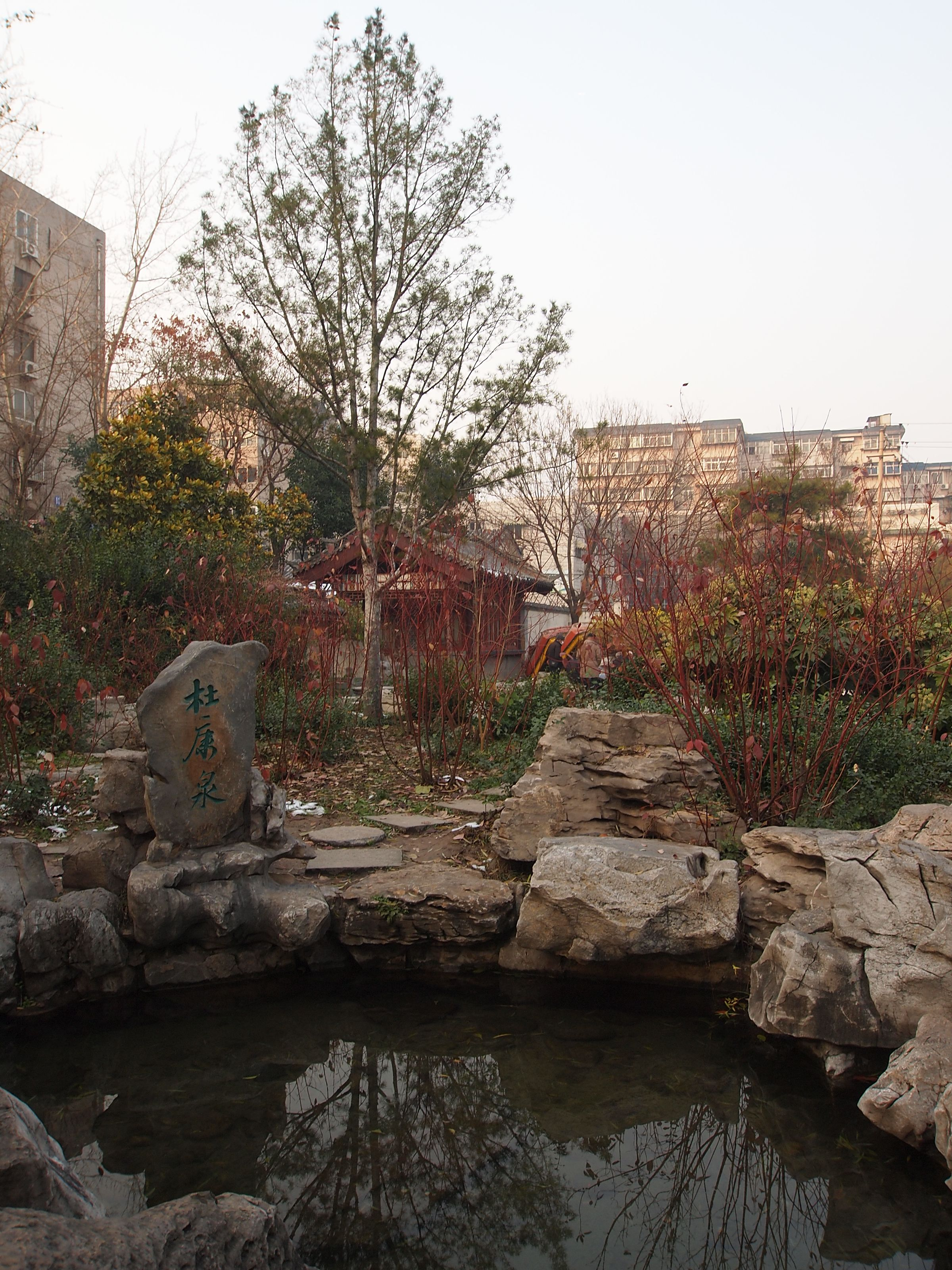
Dukang Spring in Jinan; local legend claims that Du Kang once set up a pot of wine here.

Du Kang, sometimes identified with Shao Kang, is one of the figures credited with the invention of alcoholic beverages in Chinese legend. He became the deified patron of winemakers in China and Japan (Tōji). Grain wines were an important part of ancient Chinese rites and court culture, but their invention cannot be reliably attributed to a single person.

It is unknown where, when, or if Du Kang actually lived. The dates in ancient sources range over thousands of years and miles. He is sometimes made a minister of the Yellow Emperor or the Xia ruler Shao Kang. In the 2nd-century Shuowen Jiezi, he is identified with Shao Kang himself. Du Kang's story is referenced in Cao Cao's 3rd-century poems. Since Cao, Du Kang has also been used as a metonym for any good alcohol. Ruan Ji references Du Kang in his attributed guqin piece Jiukuang. A modern Chinese wine brand carries the name.

Du Kang's son Heita is sometimes said to have accidentally invented Chinkiang vinegar when his forgetfulness allowed a vat to spoil.

== See also ==
- Ancient Legends
- Baishui County
- Chinese alcoholic beverages
- Poetry of Cao Cao
- Ruan Ji
- Sima Xiangru
