= Qi of Xia =

Qi 啓
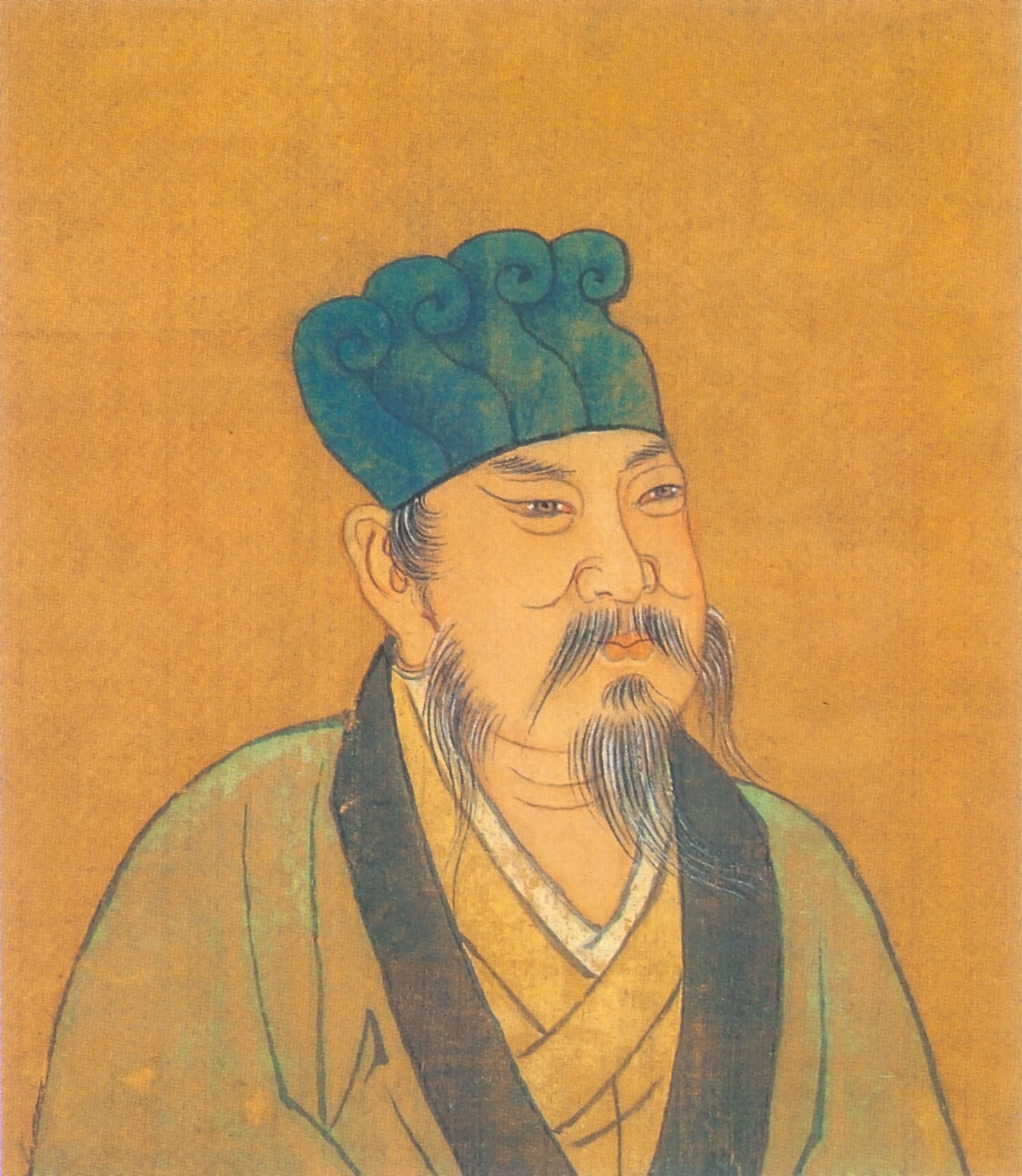
- Qing dynasty illustration of Qi.

King of the Xia dynasty
- Predecessor: Yu the Great
- Successor: Tai Kang
- Father: Yu the Great
- Mother: Nu Jiao

Qi (啓; Qǐ) was the second sovereign of the Xia dynasty. The son of Yu the Great. He ruled for roughly nine to ten years.

== Biography ==
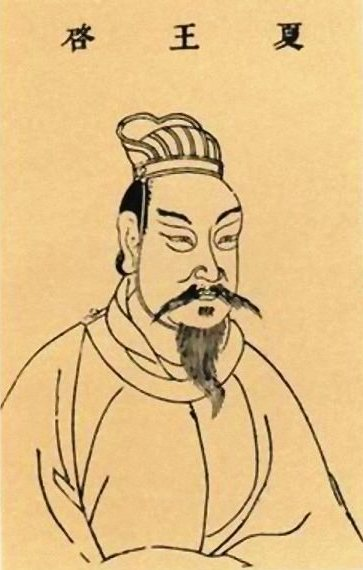
Portrait of King Qi of Xia from Sancai Tuhui

=== Family ===
Qi's father, Yu the Great, also the founder of the Xia dynasty, married Nu Jiao and had Qi. Qi was not to be the next king but due to public pressure Qi was chosen as Yu's successor, starting the dynastic tradition. Later, Qi had a son named Tài Kāng who also became the next king.

=== Reign ===
Yu died 45 years into his reign. After Qi's rule, Qi's son Tai Kang succeeded him as king.

According to the historian Sima Qian, Yu did not want his son to become king and intended to give the throne to Gao Yao, his Minister of Justice, but when Gao died Yu designated as his heir Yi (also known as Boyi), his former companion for thirteen years fighting the flood and his current Minister of Animal Husbandry. But due to Yu's great influence, all the leaders of the Xia states came to admire Qi instead of Yi, so Yi had no choice but to pass up the throne to Qi at the end of three years of mourning for Yu.

The Bamboo Annals also mention that Yu appointed Yi as his successor, but mention nothing of Yi's reigning, stating only that Yu's son Qi took the throne of Xia after the 3 years of mourning for Yu. It relates that Boyi (Yi or Yih) died in Qi's 6th year and that Qi "appointed a sacrifice for him". However, in a footnote, translator James Legge observes: "This account does not agree with the account of the death of Yih, which is often attributed to the Annals, and which was no doubt in some of the Bamboo Books; viz. that 'Yih was aiming at the throne, and K'e [Qi] put him to death'."

Qi got his throne in the year of Guihai (癸亥), and he celebrated his inauguration with all his vassals (諸侯) at Juntai (鈞臺, a platform that used to be in Yuzhou city in Henan.). He died sixteen years after he got the throne (some source say 10 years or 29 years).

== Events during his reign ==
The Bamboo Annals record the following events for Qi's reign:

- In his first year, he held great feasts in both the former capital, and his new one.
- In the second year, Boyi (伯益) "left the court and went to his state". Qi led his army to fight the rebellious prince of Hu County at the Battle of Gan (background of the "Speech at Gan" chapter in the Shang shu).
- In the sixth year, Boyi died, and Qi "appointed a sacrifice" to memorialize him.
- In the eighth year of his reign, Qi sent Mengtu (孟塗), one of his ministers to Ba 'to preside over litigations'.
- In the tenth year, he "made a tour of inspection, and celebrated a complete service of Shun's music" in Damu (大穆). Some sources may add that he created a dance named Nine Shao (九韶, see Jiu Ge).
- In his 11th year, Qi banished his youngest son Wuguan 'beyond the Yellow River's western part'.
- In the 15th year, Wuguan led a rebellion on the western Ho. Qi sent one of his ministers, Shou to lead an army to punish Wuguan, when Wuguan surrendered.

== Literary references elsewhere ==
The Eastern Zhou anthology Discourses of the States mentions Qi as one of the examples of originally virtuous kings who would beget wicked sons.

The Classic of Mountains and Seas mentions Qi several times, as 啟; Qǐ and 開; Kǎi: he is depicted as a fanciful shamanic intermediary who received sacred dances and music from the Supreme God (aka Shangdi 上帝).

== Locations presumed to be related with reign ==
The city Xinzhai is believed to have been founded by king Qi of Xia, and was the capital of the Xia dynasty until Qi's descendant Shao Kang took control of the dynasty.

Chinese archaeologist Feng Shi (冯時; 馮時) identifies Taosi culture's site Wenyi 文邑 with Xiayi 夏邑, Xia dynasty's second capital and Qi's capital. He also points to traces of violence among the archaeological evidence there to propose that "Qi seized the royal power with violence and changed the abdication system into hereditary system."

Qi of Xia Xia dynasty
Regnal titles
Preceded by Yu	King of China	Succeeded by Tai Kang
