= Xia dynasty =

Traditional first dynasty in Chinese history

Xia
- c. 2070 – c. 1600 BC
- Proposed location of the Xia dynasty
- Capital: Yangzhai (陽翟) (during Yu the Great's reign); Yangcheng; Zhenxun (from Tai Kang's reign); Shangqiu (from Xiang of Xia)
- Government: Monarchy
- King
- History
  - Established: c. 2070 BC (Note: According to the Xia–Shang–Zhou Chronology Project.)
  - Disestablished: c. 1600 BC
| Preceded by | Succeeded by |
| Three Sovereigns and Five Emperors | Shang dynasty |

Xia
- Chinese: 夏
- Hanyu Pinyin: Xià
Transcriptions
Standard Mandarin
- Hanyu Pinyin: Xià
- Bopomofo: ㄒㄧㄚˋ
- Wade–Giles: Hsia^{4}
- Tongyong Pinyin: Sià
- Yale Romanization: Syà
- MPS2: Shià
- IPA: [ɕjâ]
Wu
- Romanization: Gho
Yue: Cantonese
- Yale Romanization: Hah
- Jyutping: Haa6
- IPA: [ha˨]
Southern Min
- Tâi-lô: Hē (col.); Hā (lit.)
Middle Chinese
- Middle Chinese: /ɦˠaX/
Old Chinese
- Baxter–Sagart (2014): *[ɢ]ˤraʔ
- Zhengzhang: /*ɡraːʔ/

The Xia dynasty (/ˈʃi.ɑː/, SHEE-ah; Chinese: 夏朝; pinyin: Xiàcháo; Wade–Giles: Hsia Ch'ao) is the first dynasty in traditional Chinese historiography. Some scholars, especially Western historians and Sinologists, consider the Xia dynasty legendary or at least unsubstantiated, while a majority of Chinese archeologists consider it historical and identify it with the archaeological Erlitou culture (c. 1900–1500 BC). According to tradition, it was established by the likely legendary figure Yu the Great, after Shun, the last of the Five Emperors, gave the throne to him. In traditional historiography, the Xia dynasty was succeeded by the Shang dynasty.

There are no contemporaneous records of the Xia, and they are not mentioned in the oldest Chinese texts, the earliest oracle bone inscriptions dating from the Late Shang period (13th century BC). The earliest mentions occur in the oldest chapters of the Book of Documents, which report speeches from the early Western Zhou period and are accepted by most scholars as dating from that time. The speeches justify the Zhou conquest of the Shang as the passing of the Mandate of Heaven and liken it to the succession of the Xia by the Shang. That political philosophy was promoted by the Confucian school in the Eastern Zhou period. The succession of dynasties was incorporated into the Bamboo Annals and Shiji and became the official position of imperial historiography and ideology.

According to the traditional chronology, based upon calculations by Liu Xin, the Xia ruled between 2205 and 1766 BC. According to the chronology based on the "current text" Bamboo Annals, it ruled between 1989 and 1558 BC. Comparing the same text with dates of five-planet conjunctions, David Pankenier, supported by David Nivison, proposed dates of 1953 and 1555 BC. The Xia–Shang–Zhou Chronology Project, commissioned by the Chinese government in 1996, proposed that the Xia existed between 2070 and 1600 BC.

== Traditional historiography ==
The Xia dynasty was described in several Chinese classics, including the Book of Documents, the Bamboo Annals, and Sima Qian's Shiji. These sources make clear that the Xia was considered a historical dynasty in the first millennium BCE. The Shiji and Book of Rites say that Yu the Great, the founder of the Xia dynasty, was the grandson of Zhuanxu, who was the grandson of the Yellow Emperor. But there are also other records, like Ban Gu's, that say Yu's father was a fifth-generation descendant of Zhuanxu. Other sources, such as Classic of Mountains and Seas mention Yu's father Gun was the son of Luoming, who was the son of the Yellow Emperor. Sima Qian traced the origin of the dynasty to the name of a fief granted to Yu, who would use it as his own surname and his state's name.

According to Sima Qian and other early texts, Gun, the father of Yu the Great, is the earliest recorded member of the Xia clan. He describes how when the Yellow River flooded, many tribes united together to control and stop the flooding and Gun was appointed by Emperor Yao to stop the flooding. He ordered the construction of large levees to block the path of the water. The attempts of Gun to stop the flooding lasted for nine years, but ultimately failed because the floods strengthened. After nine years, Yao had already given his throne to Shun. Shun ordered that Gun be imprisoned for life at Yushan (羽山, 'Feather Mountain'), a mountain located between modern Donghai County in Jiangsu, and Linshu County in Shandong.

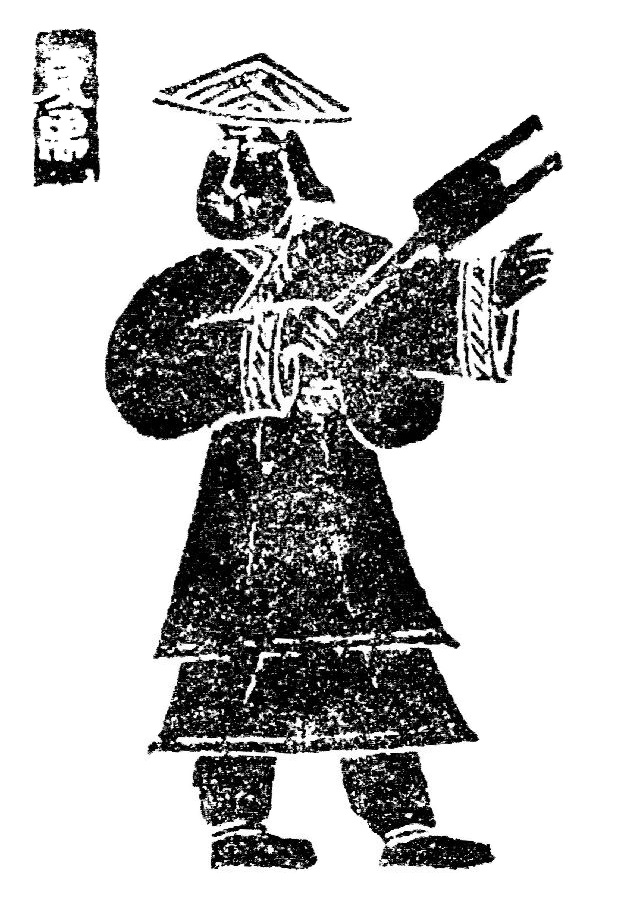
Han dynasty stone relief rendering of Yu the Great

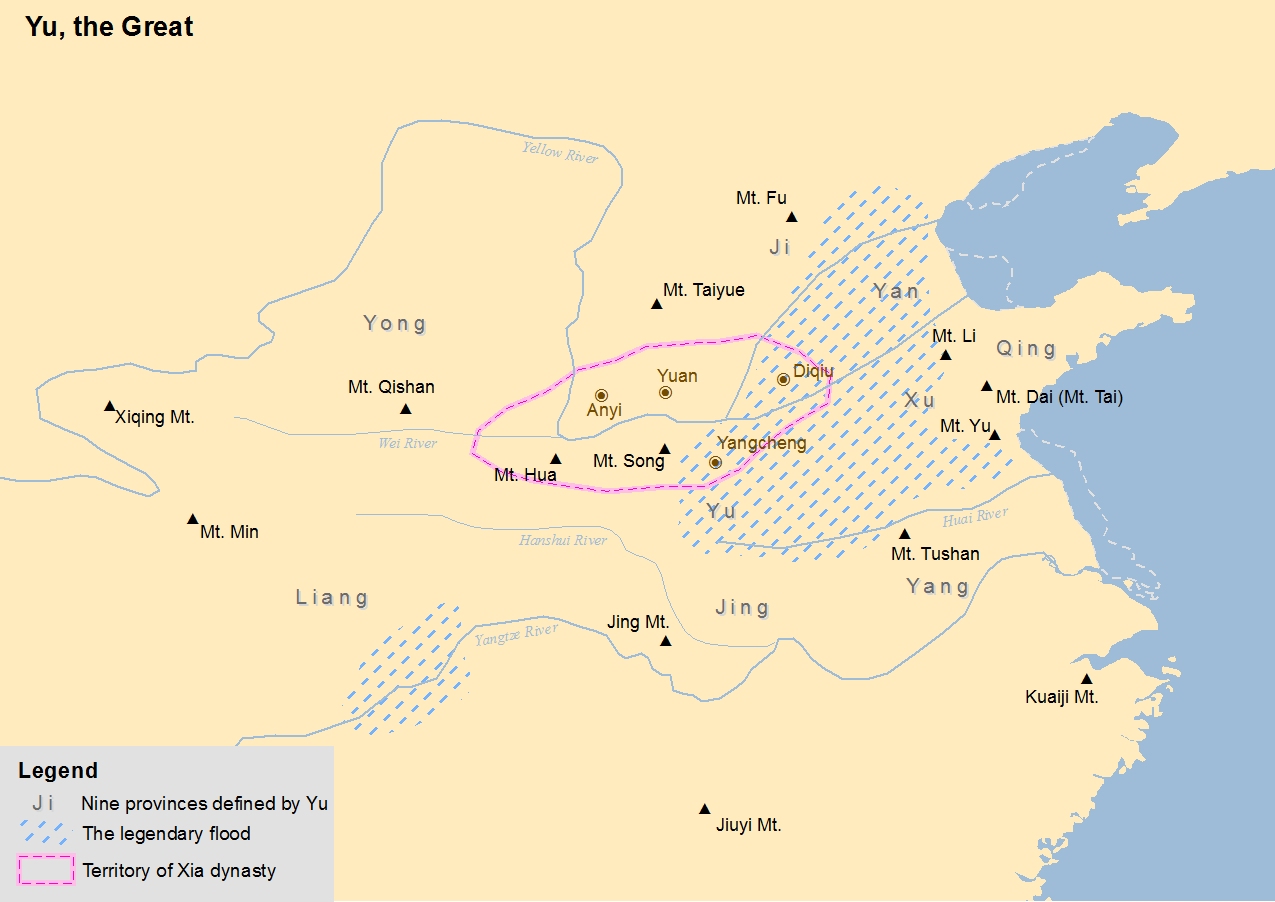
Approximate location of Xia dynasty (in pink) in traditional Chinese historiography. Because of the lack of written records, the existence of Xia is uncertain.

According to traditional accounts, Shun trusted Yu and appointed him to stop the flooding, which he did by organizing people from different tribes and ordered them to help him dig channels in all the major rivers and lead the water out to the sea. This was considered to have established the layout of the world's rivers. Legend says that in the 13 years it took him to successfully complete the work to stop the floods, he never went back to his home village to stop and rest, even though he passed by his house three times.

=== Story of founding ===
According to traditional texts, Yu's success in stopping the flooding increased agricultural production. The Xia tribe's power increased and Yu became the leader of the surrounding tribes. Soon afterwards Shun sent Yu to lead an army to suppress the Sanmiao tribe, which continuously abused the border tribes. After defeating them, he exiled them south to the Han River area. This victory strengthened the Xia tribe's power even more. As Shun aged, he thought of a successor and relinquished the throne to Yu, whom he deemed worthy. Yu's succession marks the start of the Xia dynasty. As Yu neared death he passed the throne to his son, Qi, instead of passing it to the most capable candidate, thus setting the precedent for dynastic rule or the Hereditary System. The Xia dynasty began a period of family or clan control. It is believed that Zhenxun (modern Gongyi) and Yangcheng (modern Gaocheng) were two of the capitals of the dynasty.

=== Interregnum ===
According to Sima Qian, the third Xia king was Tai Kang, described as an avid hunter but ineffective ruler. The Bamboo Annals describe the Xia capital at Zhenxun being attacked by Hou Yi, leader of the Youqiong tribe, while Tai Kang was on a hunt beyond the Luo River. The occupation of Zhenxun marked the beginning of a significant interregnum. In the eighth year of the reign of Tai Kang's nephew Xiang, Hou Yi was killed by his former chief minister Han Zhuo. 20 years later, Han Zhuo's forces killed King Xiang and usurped the throne, but the royal family escaped.

Xiang's son Shao Kang was sheltered by a tribal chief, surviving for years as a fugitive despite the efforts of Han Zhuo to eliminate him and prevent any reemergence of the Xia. Upon reaching adulthood, Shao Kang began organizing with local lords who hated Han Zhuo's rule. Shao Kang emerged victorious in the military confrontation that followed, and Han Zhuo committed suicide. The reign of Shao Kang and his son Zhu is traditionally characterized as one of the most prosperous periods in the Xia's history.

=== Overthrow ===
Jie is recorded as the final King of Xia, and as with many last rulers in Chinese historiography, he was said to be immoral, lascivious, and tyrannical. He was overthrown by Tang, who inaugurated the new Shang dynasty. King Tang is said to have given the remnants of the Xia clan a fief comprising the small state of Qi. This practice was referred to as "the two crownings and the three respects".

== Traditional structure ==
=== Nine Provinces ===
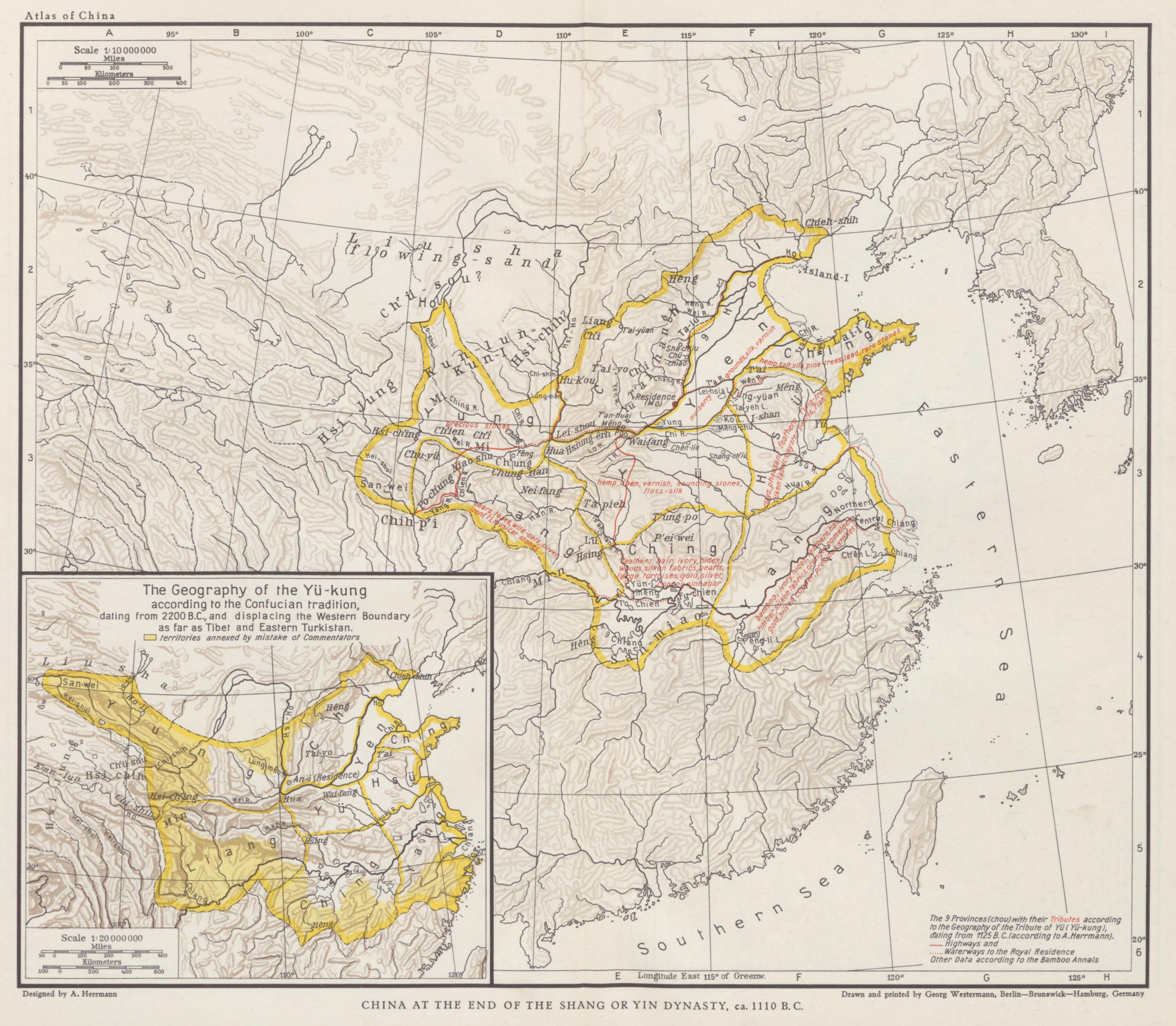
The geography of the Nine Provinces according to traditional analysis of literary sources before modern archaeological discoveries, which show them to have been greatly inflated

According to the Book of Documents, Yu the Great divided his state into nine provinces (九州). These are Ji (冀), Yan (兗), Qing (青), Xu (徐), Yang (揚), Jing (荊), Yu (豫), Liang (梁) and Yong (雍). Each province was briefly described by the Book of Documents in terms of their soil quality, their productivity and other geographical characteristics. According to the chapter "Tribute of Yu" in the text, the Nine Provinces respectively correspond to modern regions of China as:

- Ji Province corresponds to modern Hebei, Shanxi and a part of Liaoning;
- Yan Province corresponds to parts of Shandong and Hebei;
- Qing Province corresponds to the part of Shandong to the east of Mount Tai;
- Xu Province corresponds to northern parts of Jiangsu, Anhui, and the southern parts of Shandong;
- Yang Province corresponds to southern Jiangsu, southern Anhui, northern Zhejiang, and northern Jiangxi;
- Jing Province corresponds to parts of Hunan, and northwestern Jiangxi;
- Yu Province corresponds to Henan, northern Hubei, southeastern Shaanxi, and southwestern Shandong;
- Liang Province corresponds to Sichuan, southern Gansu, and Shaanxi;
- Yong Province corresponds to parts of Shaanxi, Gansu, Ningxia, and Qinghai.

=== Capital cities ===
The Xia dynasty moved the capital many times. According to traditional records, these capitals are as follows:

Capital cities of the Xia
| King | Capital city | Present location |
|---|---|---|
| Gun | Daxia | Part of Shanxi |
| Gun | Chong (崇) | Chong, Henan |
| Yu | Gaomi (密都) | Xin'an, Henan |
| Yu | Yangcheng (阳城阳翟) | Gaocheng, Dengfeng, Henan |
| Yu | Yangzhai (阳城阳翟) | Xuchang, Henan |
| Yu | Jinyang (晋阳平阳) | Jinyuan, Taiyuan |
| Yu | Pingyang (晋阳平阳) | Southwest of Linfen, Shanxi |
| Yu | Anyi (安邑) | Xia County, Yuncheng, Shanxi |
| Qi, Tai Kang | Yangzhai (陽翟) | |
| Tai Kang, Zhong Kang | Zhenxun | Speculated to be an Erlitou site 18 kilometers east of Luoyang |
| Xiang | Diqiu (商丘) or Shangqiu | Southwestern Puyang, Henan (简明中国历史地图集) |
| Xiang | Zhenxun | |
| Shao Kang | Lun (纶邑) | Yucheng, Henan |
| Shao Kang | Xiayi | Xia County, Henan |
| Shao Kang | Shangqiu | |
| Zhu | Yuan (原) | Jiyuan, Henan |
| Zhu, Huai, Mang, Xie, Bu Jiang, Jiong | Laoqiu | Kaifeng, Henan |
| Jin, Kong Jia, Gao, Fa | Xihe | Speculated to have been in Anyang, Henan |
| Jie | Zhenxun | |

=== Fangguo tribes ===
According to traditional Chinese records, the fangguo tribes were polities outside the Xia clan's direct rule. They were mostly large tribal peoples, but some were massive enough to become small states with more complex social structures, rivaling that of the Xia. Many of the tribes were described as in regular relationships with the Xia court, being either allies or enemies. Eventually, some of the tribal chiefs joined the force of Tang to overthrow Jie's regime.

=== Geopolitical system ===
According to the "Tribute of Yu" chapter of the Book of Documents, the scope of direct jurisdiction of the Xia state was limited to a small area controlled by the ruling clan. Beyond the Xia's own tribe, other tribal leaders enjoyed relatively independent management and ruling rights in their own territories; for the Xia Hou, they expressed their mutual relations in the form of submission and tribute. The Book of Documents says that Yu the Great determined the relationships between Xia and Fangguo tribes, dividing them into 5 categories according to the tribes' relative locations from the Xia clan's residence:

He [Yu] conferred lands and surnames. (He said), 'Let me set the example of a reverent attention to my virtue, and none will act contrary to my conduct, Five hundred li formed the Domain of the Sovereign. From the first hundred they brought as revenue the whole plant of the grain; from the second, the cars, with a portion of the stalk; from the third, the straw, but the people had to perform various services; from the fourth, the grain in the husk; and from the fifth, the grain cleaned.

Five hundred li (beyond) constituted the Domain of the Nobles. The first hundred li was occupied by the cities and lands of the (sovereign's) high ministers and great officers; the second, by the principalities of the barons; and the (other) three hundred, by the various other princes.

Five hundred li (still beyond) formed the Peace−securing Domain. In the first three hundred, they cultivated the lessons of learning and moral duties; in the other two, they showed the energies of war and defence.

Five hundred li (remoter still) formed the Domain of Restraint. The (first) three hundred were occupied by the tribes of the Yi; the (other) two hundred, by criminals undergoing the lesser banishment.

Five hundred li (the most remote) constituted the Wild Domain. The (first) three hundred were occupied by the tribes of the Man; the (other) two hundred, by criminals undergoing the greater banishment.

Texts like the Book of Documents, the Book of Rites, and the Mencius describe that the Xia had already established a distinguished official system with positions helping the Xia clan in managing the state. There were also laws set forth to maintain social stability within the country.

=== Economic status ===
Traditional narratives describe the Xia as enjoying prosperity in agriculture; the Analects describe how Yu the Great devoted himself to irrigation, improving the drainage system for cultivating crops. The texts also say that the people of Xia were gifted in producing alcohol, thanks to the notable legendary figure of Du Kang who is usually identified with Shao Kang (traditionally associated with the invention of alcohol). The population was described as having vegetables and rice as staple crops, with meat usually reserved for sacrifices. Additionally, manufacture of goods and trade with outside tribes flourished. The site at Erlitou contains many metallic fragments, suggesting that the time assigned to the Xia was characterized by bronze metallurgy.

During Yu the Great's controlling of the floods, he renewed the transportation system. Sima Qian wrote in his Records of the Grand Historian that Yu used carriages to travel on land, boats to travel on rivers, sleds to travel on mud, and horses to cross the mountains. He surveyed the lands and opened up routes through geographical locations so that tributes from tribal chiefs to the Xia would be more convenient. He organized people to build roads connecting the Nine Provinces, helping to improve tributary and economic relations between the tribes. Traditional texts record that the transport system of the Xia clan extended at least 500 – 600 li horizontally and 300 – 400 li vertically. The Guoyu also records that the Xia dynasty ordered the roads to be opened up in the 9th month, the bridges to be finished in the 10th month.

=== Population estimates ===
Although the existence of the Xia dynasty remains unproven and there are no population records from the Bronze Age, scholars have attempted to estimate its population by projecting backwards from known populations 1500 years later. The Book of the Later Han quotes Huangfu Mi's work Diwang Shiji, which claims that when Yu the Great finished establishing the Nine Provinces, the total population was 13,553,923 individuals; however, this number is highly speculative because Huangfu Mi reached his conclusion by extrapolating from demographic statuses of the Qin, Han, Jin dynasties. Modern Chinese scholars estimated the Xia's population by employing records from ancient texts. Records have it that when Tai Kang established Lun as his capital, the settlement had about 500 soldiers (one lu according to Du Yu). Modifying the figures and adding other types of people, Song Zhenhao postulated that this supposed city had between 1500 and 2500 individuals by the time of Tai Kang, a number he classified as medium. Estimating the number of populous cities, Song finally calculated the result of over 2 million. Wang Yumin, using description of demography during the reign of Emperor Shun who directly preceded the Xia, concluded that the population of the dynasty was around 2.1 million.

== Modern studies ==
The time gap between the supposed time of the Xia and the first written references to it have meant that the historicity of the Xia dynasty itself and the traditional narrative of its history are at best uncertain. The Doubting Antiquity School led by Gu Jiegang in the 1920s were the first scholars within China to systematically question the traditional story of its early history. By critically examining the development of the narrative of early Chinese history throughout history, Gu concluded, "the later the time, the longer the legendary period of earlier history [...] early Chinese history is a tale told and retold for generations, during which new elements were added to the front end".

Some historians have suggested that the Zhou rulers invented the Xia as a pretext, to justify their conquest of the Shang, by noting that just as the Shang had supplanted the Xia, they had supplanted the Shang. The existence of the Xia remains unproven, despite efforts by Chinese archaeologists to link them with the Bronze Age Erlitou culture.

Among other points, Gu and other historians note certain parallels between the traditional narrative of Xia history and Shang history that would suggest probable Zhou-era fabrication or at least embellishment of Xia history. Yun Kuen Lee's criticism of nationalist sentiment in developing an explanation of Three Dynasties chronology focuses on the dichotomy of evidence provided by archaeological versus historical research, in particular, the claim that the archaeological Erlitou culture is also the historical Xia dynasty. "How to fuse the archaeological dates with historical dates is a challenge to all chronological studies of early civilization."

In The Shape of the Turtle: Myth, Art, and Cosmos in Early China, Sarah Allan noted that many aspects of the Xia are simply the opposite of traits held to be emblematic of the Shang. The implied dualism of the Shang myth system, Allan argues, is that while the Shang represent the suns, sky, birds, east and life, the Xia represent the moons, watery underworld, dragons, west and death. Allan argues that this mythical Xia was re-interpreted by the Zhou as a ruling dynasty replaced by the Shang, a parallel with their own replacement of the Shang.

Other scholars also argue that Shang political class's remnants still existed during the early Zhou dynasty, Zhou rulers could not simply justify their succession to pacify Shang remnants if it had been entirely fabricated since the Shang remnants, who remembered prior histories, would not believe it in the first place. For example, the Classic of Poetry preserves the "Eulogies of Shang" (商頌 Shāng sòng) which represents the powerful state of Song, whose rulers were the direct descendants of Shang dynasty. Among those eulogies, the eulogy Chang Fa (長發) celebrated victories by the "martial king" Tang of Shang against Wei (韋), Gu (顧), Kunwu (昆吾), and Jie of Xia. During the later Song dynasty (960–1279 AD), an ancient bronze artifact, Shu Yi Zhong (叔夷鐘), was unearthed with an inscription describing how the founder of the Shang dynasty, Tang, overthrew the Xia dynasty. Shu Yi, the owner of this artifact, was a high officer of the state of Qi during the Spring and Autumn period (c. 600 BC), was actually a direct descendant of the Song rulers, which means he himself was a descendant of Shang people. This bronze artifact was used to memorialize his Shang ancestors. The inscription contradicts the hypothesis that the Zhou manufactured the existence of the Xia.

Although the Shang oracle bone inscriptions contain no mention of the Xia, some scholars have suggested that polities they mention might be remnants of the Xia. Guo Moruo suggested that an enemy state called "Tufang" mentioned in many inscriptions might be identified with the Xia. Historian Shen Changyun points to four inscriptions mentioning Qi, the same name as the state of Qi, which according to traditional accounts was established by the defeated royal house of Xia.

== Archaeological discoveries ==
Erlitou sites (black) and Xia capitals identified in traditional sources (red, with numbers for those from the "current text" Bamboo Annals)

Inspired by the discovery of the late Shang capital (Yinxu) near modern Anyang, Chinese archaeologists searched the Yellow River basin for earlier capitals. In 1959, Xu Xusheng conducted a survey of the Yi–Luo basin, which he had identified from received texts as a possible location of Xia capitals. Among his discoveries was the large Bronze Age site of Erlitou near modern Yanshi. The site was an urban centre, with rammed-earth foundations of several buildings, which were interpreted as palaces or temples. Radiocarbon dating in the late 20th century had wide error margins, and placed the Erlitou culture between 2100 and 1300 BC, which fit well with the traditional dates of the Xia. Most Chinese archaeologists identify the Xia with Erlitou, while many western archaeologists argue that the identification, and indeed the very existence of Xia, is unprovable, due to the lack of testable detail in the traditional accounts. For a time, archaeologists debated which of the four phases of Erlitou should be interpreted as Xia and which as Shang.

The refined dating techniques used by the Xia–Shang–Zhou Chronology Project produced a narrower range for the Erlitou culture of 1880 to 1520 BC. The project assigned all four phases of Erlitou to the Xia, and identified the transition to the Shang with the construction of walled cities at Yanshi and Zhengzhou around 1600 BC. Since the project had settled on a start date for the Xia of 2070 BC, based on received texts, this forced them to designate the late part of the Henan Longshan culture, including the Xinzhai phase, as the early part of the Xia period. No corresponding cultural transition in the archaeological record has yet been discovered. Even more refined carbon dating in 2005 and 2006 produced more tightly defined ranges, dating Xinzhai at 1870–1720 BC and Erlitou at 1735–1530 BC.

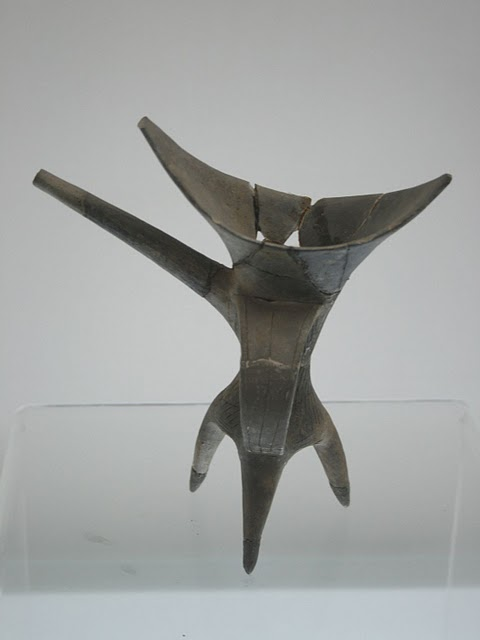
Erlitou jue vessel

The only musical instruments found at Erlitou are a qing sounding stone, two small clapper bells (one earthenware, one bronze) and a xun with one finger hole. Due to this extreme scarcity of surviving instruments and the general uncertainty surrounding most of the Xia, creating a musical narrative of the period is impractical.

Archaeological evidence of a large outburst flood at Jishi Gorge that destroyed the Lajia site on the upper reaches of the Yellow River has been dated to c. 1920 BC. This date is shortly before the rise of the Erlitou culture in the middle Yellow River valley and the Yueshi culture in Shandong, following the decline of the Longshan culture in the North China Plain. The authors suggest that this flood may have been the basis for the later myth of Yu the Great, and contributed to the cultural transition into the Erlitou period. They further argue that the timing is further evidence for the identification of the Xia with the Erlitou culture. However, no evidence of contemporaneous widespread flooding in the North China Plain has yet been found.

The Cambridge History of Ancient China (1999) takes the beginning of Chinese history as the Xia's successor Shang dynasty (c. 1600 – c. 1046 BC). Xie Weiyang responded to this standpoint unfavorably towards efforts in China to link archaeological research to historical records:

The Cambridge History of Ancient China adopted this standpoint with the promise of providing a commonly accepted synthesis based on an exhaustive discussion of the latest pre-Qin material available at the end of the 1990s. This is of extraordinary significance, because if this book aims to provide a commonly accepted synthesis, then the blood, sweat, and tears of Chinese scholars over the past decade that brought about countless achievements in Xia period research will become a joke, and many Chinese scholars in the field will lose all sense of direction and not know how to get back on the right track.

However, as Chen Chun and Gong Xin point out, the debate upon the Xia dynasty's historical existence stems from different research orientations between Chinese and Western scholars. The authors assert that overseas scientific communities are hesitant to accept the results of Chinese researchers because their studies used traditional narratives of the Xia as a guide that instructed them on what to find, and because they quickly linked newly discovered artifacts, constructions and other evidences as representing the proof for the Xia's actual existence. They claim that mainland Chinese scholars focused mainly on extrapolations of excavated evidence to establish a historical perspective, and overlooked other complex factors in ancient human activities. This method, according to the two authors, resulted in high levels of subjectivity and contradicted the common trend among Western researchers, which took the physical discoveries as not necessarily representing real social or political units.

== Sovereigns ==
The following table lists the rulers of Xia according to the Records of the Grand Historian. Unlike Sima's list of Shang kings, which is closely matched by inscriptions on oracle bones from late in that period, records of Xia rulers have not yet been found in archaeological excavations of contemporary sites, or records on later Shang dynasty oracle bones.

Posthumous names
| No. | Years | Name | Notes |
|---|---|---|---|
| 1 | 45 | Yu 禹 | Founder of the Xia |
| 2 | 10 | Qi of Xia 啟 | Son of Yu |
| 3 | 29 | Tai Kang 太康 | Son of Qi |
| 4 | 13 | Zhong Kang 仲康 | Son of Qi, younger brother of Tai Kang |
| 5 | 28 | Xiang 相 | Son of Zhong Kang |
| 6 | 21 | Shao Kang 少康 | Son of Xiang. Restored the Xia. |
| 7 | 17 | Zhu 杼 | Son of Shao Kang |
| 8 | 26 | Huai 槐 | Son of Zhu |
| 9 | 18 | Mang 芒 | Son of Huai |
| 10 | 16 | Xie 泄 | Son of Mang |
| 11 | 59 | Bu Jiang 不降 | Son of Xie |
| 12 | 21 | Jiong 扃 | Son of Xie, younger brother of Bu Jiang |
| 13 | 21 | Jin 廑 | Son of Jiong |
| 14 | 31 | Kong Jia 孔甲 | Son of Bu Jiang, nephew of Jiong, cousin of Jin |
| 15 | 11 | Gao 皋 | Son of Kong Jia |
| 16 | 11 | Fa 發 | Son of Gao |
| 17 | 52 | Jie 桀 | Son of Fa. Also known as Lu Gui (履癸). |

=== Family tree ===
Xia dynasty

^{(1)} Yu the Great 大禹
^{(2)} Qi 啟
^{(3)} Tai Kang 太康 | ^{(4)} Zhong Kang 仲康
^{(5)} Xiang 相
^{(6)} Shao Kang 少康
^{(7)} Zhu 杼
^{(8)} Huai 槐
^{(9)} Mang 芒
^{(10)} Xie 泄
^{(11)} Bu Jiang 不降 | ^{(12)} Jiong 扃
^{(14)} Kong Jia 孔甲 | ^{(13)} Jin 廑
^{(15)} Gao 皋
^{(16)} Fa 發
^{(17)} Jie 桀

== See also ==
- Predynastic Shang
- List of Neolithic cultures of China

== Notes ==
| Preceded by Three Sovereigns and Five Emperors | Dynasties in Chinese history 2070–1600 BC | Succeeded by Shang dynasty |
