= Tai Kang =

Tai Kang 太康
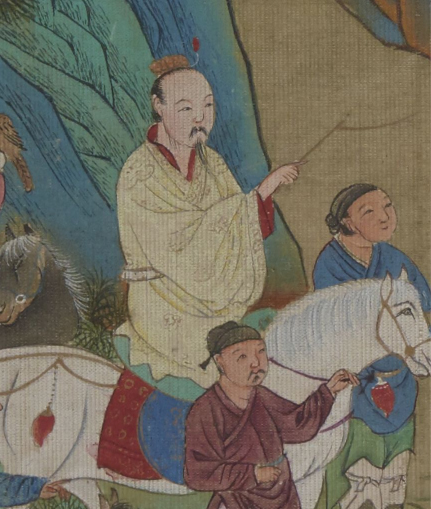
- Tai Kang as depicted in the 18th-century Chinese-French edition of the Dijian Tushuo(帝鑑圖說), Recueil Historique de Principaux Traits de la Vie des Empereurs Chinois

King of the Xia dynasty
- Predecessor: Qi of Xia
- Successor: Zhong Kang
- Dynasty: Xia dynasty
- Father: Qi of Xia

Tai Kang (Chinese: 太康; pinyin: Tài Kāng; Wade–Giles: T'ai-k'ang) was the third sovereign of the Xia dynasty. He was the son of the king Qi of Xia and paternal grandson of Yu the Great and his queen Nu Jiao.

== Biography ==
Tai Kang loved to hunt and did not rule well.

According to the Bamboo Annals, Tai Kang took the throne in the year of Guiwei. His capital was in Zhenxun (斟鄩). In his first year, while he went hunting beyond the Luo River, Houyi came and occupied Zhenxin. Tai Kang died 4 years later, or according to the book Lushi, 10 years later.

According to Records of the Grand Historian, he ruled about 19 years and lost his regime. "Taiping Yulan" claims he was a tyrant who ruled for 29 years, then lost his regime and vanished.

He was succeeded by his brother Zhong Kang and nephew Xiang of Xia.

In some sources, Tai Kang was drowned in a lake.

== See also ==
- List of Chinese monarchs

== In literature ==
The Book of Documents features Songs of the Five Sons (五子之歌) among the documents of Xia (Chapter 8). According to the introductory note, the document contains the pieces composed by Tai Kang's five younger brothers when he lost the country. Yongbieocheonga mentions the king as a person that should not be imitated.

== Commemoration ==
Taikang County in Henan was named after him, and his mausoleum is also inside his county.

== Sources ==
Tai Kang Xia dynasty
Regnal titles
Preceded by Qi	King of China	Succeeded by Zhong Kang
