= Shao Kang =

Shao Kang 少康
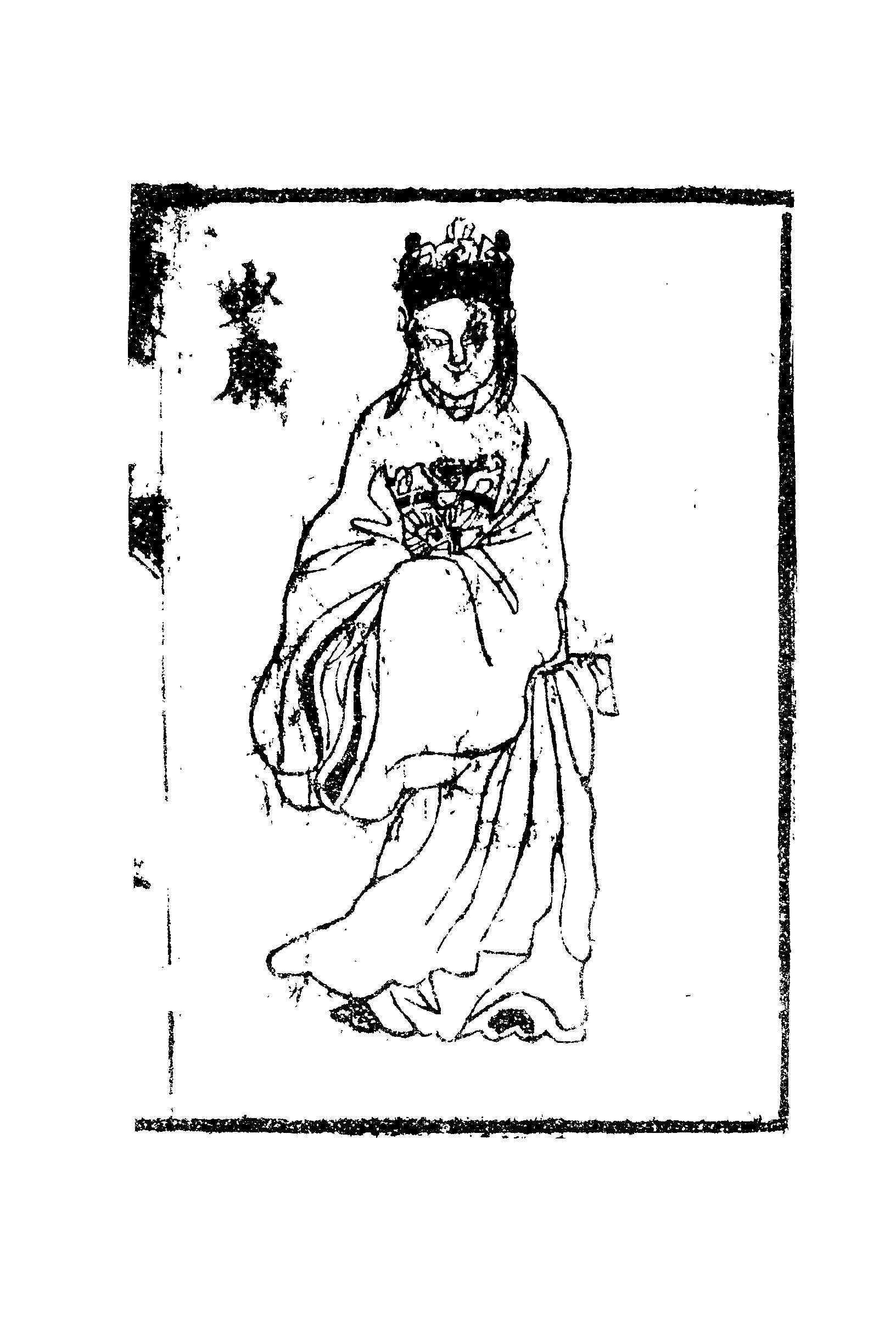
- 1814 illustration

King of the Xia dynasty
- Predecessor: Xiang
- Successor: Zhu
- Spouse: Daughter of the Chief of Northern Tribe
- Issue: Zhu
- Dynasty: Xia dynasty
- Father: Xiang of Xia
- Mother: Ji

Shao Kang (Chinese: 少康; pinyin: Shào Kāng; Wade–Giles: Shao-k'ang, his surname was Sì 姒) was the sixth sovereign of the Xia dynasty of ancient China. He was the son of Xiang. His father was killed in a battle against Han Zhuo's two sons, Han Jiao and Han Yi; Shao Kang's mother Ji managed to escape and had him after a few months. After he grew up, Shao Kang and his followers engaged in a battle against Han Zhuo, defeated and killed him, and restored the Xia dynasty.

He was succeeded as king by his son Zhu. Another son Wuyu was traditionally credited with civilizing the Yue of Zhejiang and establishing the state of Yue at Kuaiji.

Shao Kang is sometimes identified with Du Kang, the legendary inventor of wine in Chinese mythology.

== Early history ==
Shao Kang's restoration of Xia is considered a significant Chinese legend. Prior to Shao Kang, the Xia kings had become corrupt, squandered away the family fortune, and lost the good will of the people. Shao Kang's father was on the run and only held the title of Emperor in name. When Xiang was killed, Shao Kang's mother supposedly escaped by crawling through a hole dug by dogs at the foot of a wall. She escaped to her parents' holding and secretly gave birth to Shao Kang. Because the world did not know about Shao Kang, most presumed that the last of the Xia family had died.

Under the protection of his maternal grandfather, Shao Kang grew up. From an early age, his mother taught Shao Kang his birthright, the failing of his family in corruption, and the need to restore rule. Under his mother and grandfather's watchful eyes, Shao Kang learned history, literature and the art of war, for the eventual goal of overthrowing Han Zhuo and restoring Xia.

By the time Shao Kang turned 16, the rumor of his existence as the last heir of Xia had reached Han Zhuo. Soon Han Zhuo dispatched his two sons to find and kill Shao Kang, and he was forced to flee from his grandfather's estate.

== Restoration ==
He managed to find safety in a northern tribe. The tribal leader had some past ties to the Xia royal family and resented the rule of Han Zhuo and his tyrannical ways. He saw potential in the young exiled prince of Xia, so he decided to grant Shao Kang his daughter's hand in marriage, and 100 sq. "li" (about 25 sq. miles) of rich farm land as his own fief. This gave Shao Kang a base of operation, from which he could learn the art of state management and build his own population center to prepare.

In the first three dynasties of China, most of China was sparsely populated wilderness. It was often the case that secondary heirs of noble and royal families were given land grants over vast, empty regions, where they were expected to build their own population centers, attract migrant populations to settle in their regions, and thus build their own fortunes. Eldest sons were expected to inherit the primary estate of their fathers and continue to build the existing population centers. Younger sons and secondary heirs were given the opportunity to prove their worth by the land grants. Successful leaders could build their own city states and eventually their own Kingdoms.

Coincidentally, to the good fortune of Shao Kang in his marriage and his land grant, a former minister of Xia had hidden away a vast sum of treasure and had been buying arms and building an army in secret preparation for revenge on Han Zhuo. This minister, upon hearing that the heir of Xia had survived, rejoiced and immediately joined forces with Shao Kang, thus renewing his loyalty to Xia. With his base secure and his army building and training, Shao Kang continued to build his estate under the old banner of Xia, preaching and reminding people of the benevolence of old Xia rule.

In the meantime, Han Zhuo grew increasingly tyrannical and imposed heavy taxes upon the people of Xia. Many people fled from his rule. When Shao Kang's new Xia Kingdom grew in size and fortune, so spread the word of Shao Kang's benevolence. People began to compare Shao Kang to the 1st benevolent emperors of Xia. Many fled to settle in Shao Kang's estate.

== Victory ==
Han Zhuo became fearful that Xia had survived and now rivaled his power in size. He despatched his sons in the largest expedition force he could muster to destroy Shao Kang. Shao Kang by this time had become a seasoned leader. He gathered up his forces to meet Han Zhuo's army. He won the battle decisively and killed Han Zhuo's sons. Then Shao Kang's army swept to the door step of the old Xia capital, where the Xia people greeted him as a liberator by opening the door to the citadel. Han Zhuo, sensing defeat, committed suicide.

Shao Kang entered the Xia capital as the king of Xia. He ordered his army to protect the people and their possessions and to restore peace, allowing Xia to prosper.

== As king ==
With Xia's ancestral home secured, Shao Kang paid homage to his ancestors and received the homage of surrounding tributary kingdoms, cementing his reclamation of his regal birthright.

This highly political and symbolic ritual grew into the official ancestor veneration religion of China. Each kingdom was essentially one clan. As the heads of their respective clans, royal families were protectors of the clan ancestors' bones and were responsible for officiating religious ceremonies as a state function, thereby enhancing their prestige. A kingdom that was too poor to conduct its ceremonies with sufficient splendor was considered weak enough to be destroyed.

Zengzi was a descendant of Shao Kang.

Shao Kang Xia dynasty
Regnal titles
Preceded by Xiang	King of China; 2007–1985 BC	Succeeded by Zhu
