= Zhenxun =

Last capital of the Chinese Xia dynasty

Zhenxun (Chinese: 斟鄩; pinyin: Zhēnxún) was the last capital for the pre historical Chinese Xia dynasty. There is a consensus among many Chinese scholars that the Erlitou site about 20 km east of central Luoyang is identified as Zhenxun.
