= Outline of ancient China =

Overview of and topical guide to ancient China

The following outline is provided as an overview of and topical guide to ancient China:

Ancient China – China under the rule of the Xia, Shang, and Zhou dynasties, beginning around 2070 B.C. and extending until approximately 256 B.C.

== Geography of ancient China ==
=== Locations in ancient China ===
- List of Bronze Age sites in China

==== Regions of ancient China ====
- Regions of ancient China during the Xia and Shang dynasties
  - Nine Provinces
    1. Ji Province
    2. Jing Province
    3. Liang Province
    4. Qing Province
    5. Xu Province
    6. Yan Province
    7. Yang Province
    8. Yong Province
    9. Yu Province

== Government and politics of ancient China ==
- Political thought in ancient China
  - Mandate of Heaven
- Ancient Chinese states
- Interstate relations during the Spring and Autumn period
- Family tree of ancient Chinese emperors
- Aristocracy in ancient China (nobility)

=== Rulers in ancient China ===
- Three Sovereigns and Five Emperors
  - Yellow Emperor
  - Shaohao
  - Zhuanxu
  - Ku
  - Zhi
  - Yao
  - Shun
- Kings of the Xia dynasty
  - Yu the Great
  - Qi
  - Tai Kang
  - Zhong Kang
  - Xiang
  - Shao Kang
  - Zhu
  - Huai
  - Mang
  - Xie
  - Bu Jiang
  - Jiong
  - Jin
  - Kong Jia
  - Gao
  - Fa
  - Jie
- Kings of the Shang Dynasty
  - Early Shang period
    - Da Yi
    - Da Ding
    - Da Jia
    - Bu Bing
    - Da Geng
    - Xiao Jia
    - Da Wu
    - Lü Ji
    - Zhong Ding
    - Bu Ren
    - Jian Jia
    - Zu Yi
    - Zu Xin
    - Qiang Jia
    - Zu Ding
    - Nan Geng
    - Xiang Jia
  - Yin period
    - Pan Geng
    - Xiao Xin
    - Xiao Yi
    - Wu Ding
    - Zu Geng
    - Zu Jia
    - Lin Xin
    - Kang Ding
    - Wu Yi
    - Wen Wu Ding
    - Di Yi
    - Di Xin
  - Kings of the Zhou Dynasty
    - Western Zhou
      - King Wen
      - King Wu
      - King Cheng
      - King Kang
      - King Zhao
      - King Mu
      - King Gong
      - King Yih
      - King Yi
      - King Li
      - King Xuan
      - King You
    - Eastern Zhou
      - King Ping
      - King Huan
      - King Zhuang
      - King Xi
      - King Hui
      - King Xiang
      - King Kuang
      - King Ding
      - King Jian
      - King Ling
      - King Jing
      - King Dao
      - King Jing
      - King Yuan
      - King Zhending
      - King Ai
      - King Si
      - King Kao
      - King Weilie
      - King An
      - King Lie
      - King Xian
      - King Shenjing
      - King Nan

=== Ancient Chinese law ===
- Traditional Chinese law

=== Military history of ancient China ===
==== Military of ancient China ====
- Ancient Chinese armor
- Crossbow
- Military thought
  - During the Zhou Dynasty
    - Six Secret Teachings – attributed to Lü Shang (a.k.a. Jiang Ziya), a top general of King Wen of Zhou, founder of the Zhou dynasty
  - During Warring States period – great period for military strategy; of the Seven Military Classics of China, four were written during this period:
    - The Art of War – attributed to Sun Tzu, a highly influential study of strategy and tactics.
    - Sun Bin's Art of War – attributed to Sun Bin, a general and military strategist who was supposedly the descendant of Sun Tzu.
    - Wuzi – attributed to Wu Qi, a statesman and commander who served the states of Wei and then Chu.
    - Wei Liaozi – of uncertain authorship.
    - The Methods of the Sima – attributed to Sima Rangju, a commander serving the state of Qin.

== General history of ancient China ==
=== Ancient Chinese history, by period ===
History of ancient China

- Neolithic China (c. 8500 – c. 2070 BC) – predates ancient China
- Bronze Age China
  - Xia dynasty (c. 2070 – c. 1600 BC)
  - Shang dynasty (c. 1600 – c. 1046 BC)
  - Zhou dynasty (c. 1046 – 256 BC|BCE)
    - Western Zhou (1046–771 BC)
- Iron Age China
  - Zhou dynasty (continued)
    - Eastern Zhou
      - Spring and Autumn period (771 – 476 BC)
      - Warring States period (475 – 221 BC)

=== Ancient Chinese history, by region ===
See also Regions of ancient China, above

- Ancient history of Beijing
- Ancient history of Shanghai
- Ye

=== Ancient Chinese history, by subject ===
See the rest of this outline

=== Works on ancient Chinese history ===
- Records of the Grand Historian
- The Cambridge History of Ancient China
- Twenty-Four Histories

== Culture of ancient China ==
- Ancient Chinese urban planning
- Architecture in ancient China
  - Ancient Chinese wooden architecture
- Dogs in ancient China
- Elephants in ancient China
- Games in ancient China
  - Chuiwan
  - Cuju
  - Go
  - Liubo
- Mythology of China
  - Chinese creation myth
  - Chinese dragon
  - Chinese flood myths
    - Great Flood (China)
    - Great flood and procreation
    - Sinking city myth
  - Imperial examination in Chinese mythology
- Rhinoceroses in ancient China
- Women in ancient and imperial China

=== Art in ancient China ===
==== Performing arts in ancient China ====
- Juggling in ancient China
- Music in ancient China
  - Yayue

=== Language in ancient China ===
- Old Chinese or Archaic Chinese
- Classical Chinese or Literary Chinese
- History of names in ancient China
  - History of Chinese personal names
  - History of Chinese surnames in ancient China
    - Origin of Chinese surnames
    - Eight Great Surnames of Chinese Antiquity
- Evolution of written Chinese
  - Oracle bone script – earliest confirmed evidence of the Chinese script yet discovered is the body of inscriptions carved on oracle bones from the late Shang dynasty (c. 1200–1050 BC).
  - Chinese bronze inscriptions
  - Seal script

=== Literature in ancient China ===
- Ancient Chinese classics

=== People in ancient China ===
- Ancient Chinese philosophers
- Family tree of ancient Chinese emperors

=== Philosophy in ancient China ===
Ancient Chinese philosophy

- Hundred Schools of Thought
- School of Names
- Ancient Chinese philosophers

== Economics and infrastructure of ancient China ==
- Economic history of ancient China
- Coinage in ancient China

== Science and technology of ancient China ==
- Chariots in ancient China
  - Xi Zhong
- Bamboo and wooden slips
- Crossbow

== See also ==
- Outline of ancient history
  - Outline of ancient Egypt
  - Outline of ancient Greece
  - Outline of ancient India
  - Outline of ancient Rome
- Early Imperial period
  - Qin dynasty (221–206 BC)
  - Han dynasty (206 BC – 220 CE)
    - End of the Han dynasty (189 – 220 CE)
