= Family tree of Chinese monarchs (before 256 BCE) =

This is a family tree of Chinese monarchs covering the period of the Five Emperors up through the end of the Spring and Autumn period.

Family trees of Chinese monarchs
- (ancient)
- (Spring and Autumn period)
- (Warring States period)
- (early)
- (middle)
- (late)

== Five Emperors ==
The legendary Five Emperors were traditionally regarded as the founders of the Chinese state. The Records of the Grand Historian states that Shaohao did not accede to the throne while Emperor Zhi’s ephemeral and uneventful rule disqualify him from the Five Emperors in all sources. Other sources name Yu the Great, the founder of the Xia dynasty, as the last of the Five. Pretenders are italicized.

Family tree of ancient Five Emperors

Legend

Descent

Adopted

^{(1)} Taihao 太昊
□
Youxiong (clan) 有熊氏
Shaodian 少典
^{(3)} Yellow Emperor 黃帝	^{(2)} Flame Emperor 炎帝
^{(4)} Shaohao 少昊	Changyi 昌意
Jiaoji 蟜極	^{(5)} Zhuanxu 顓頊
^{(6)} Emperor Ku 嚳	Qiongchan 窮蟬	King of Gu Shu 古蜀王	□	Cheng 称	Taowu 梼杌	Wangliang 魍魉
^{(7)} Emperor Zhi 挚	Xie of Shang 契	^{(8)} Emperor; Yao 堯	Houji 后稷	Jingkang 敬康	□	Lao Tong 老童
Danzhu 丹朱	Juwang 句望	Luo Ming
Zhurong 祝融	Wuhui 吳回
Qiaoniu 橋牛	Gun 鯀
Gusou 瞽叟	^{(10)} Yu 禹	Luzhong 陸終
Ehuang 娥皇	^{(9)} Emperor Shun 舜	Nuying 女英	Kunwu 昆吾	Shen Hu 參胡	Peng Zu 彭祖	Hui Ren 會人	Yan An 晏安	Ji Lian 季連
Shangjun 商均

Numbers in parentheses mark a possible enthronement order of the emperors that are considered by one or more authorities to be among the "Five Emperors".

== Xia dynasty ==
This is a family tree for the Xia dynasty which ruled circa 2000–1750 BC. The historicity of the dynasty has sometimes been questioned, but circumstantial archaeological evidence supports its existence.

Xia dynasty

^{(1)} Yu the Great 大禹
^{(2)} Qi 啟
^{(3)} Tai Kang 太康	^{(4)} Zhong Kang 仲康
^{(5)} Xiang 相
^{(6)} Shao Kang 少康
^{(7)} Zhu 杼
^{(8)} Huai 槐
^{(9)} Mang 芒
^{(10)} Xie 泄
^{(11)} Bu Jiang 不降	^{(12)} Jiong 扃
^{(14)} Kong Jia 孔甲	^{(13)} Jin 廑
^{(15)} Gao 皋
^{(16)} Fa 發
^{(17)} Jie 桀

== Shang dynasty ==
This is a family tree for the Shang dynasty, which ruled China proper between circa 1750 BC and 1046 BC. The Shang rulers bore the title Di (帝).

Shang kings

Xie 契
Zhao Ming 昭明
Xiang Tu 相土
Chang Ruo 昌若
Cao Yu 曹圉
Ming 冥
Wang Hai 王亥	Wang Gen 王亙
Jia Wei 上甲微
Bao Yi 报乙
Bao Bing 报丙
Bao Ding 报丁
Zhu Ren 主壬
Zhu Kui 主癸
^{(1)}Tang 湯
^{(2)}Da Ding 大丁	^{(4)}Wai Bing 外丙	^{(5)}Zhong Ren 仲壬
^{(3)}Tai Jia 太甲
^{(6)}Qiang Ding 羌丁	^{(7)}Da Geng 大庚
^{(8)}Xiao Jia 小甲	^{(9)}Yong Ji 雍己	^{(10)}Da Wu 大戊
^{(11)}Zhong Ding 中丁	^{(12)}Wai Ren 外壬	^{(13)}He Dan Jia 河亶甲
^{(14)}Zu Yi 祖乙
^{(15)}Zu Xin 祖辛	^{(16)}Qiang Jia 羌甲
^{(17)}Zu Ding 祖丁	^{(18)}Nan Geng 南庚
^{(19)}Yang Jia 陽甲	^{(20)}Pan Geng 盤庚	^{(21)}Xiao Xin 小辛	^{(22)}Xiao Yi 小乙
^{(23)}Wu Ding 武丁; 1250–1192 BC
Xiao Ji 孝己	^{(24)}Zu Geng 祖庚; 1192–1181 BC	^{(25)}Zu Jia 祖甲; 1181–1159 BC
^{(26)}Lin Xin 廩辛; 1159–1155 BC	^{(27)}Kang Ding 康丁; 1155–1147 BC
^{(28)}Wu Yi 武乙; 1147–1112 BC
^{(29)}Wen Ding 文丁; 1112–1102 BC
Bi Gan 比干	^{(30)}Di Yi 帝乙; 1101–1076 BC
Kiji 微子启	Wei Zhong Yan 微仲衍	^{(31)}Di Xin 帝辛; 1075–1046 BC
Wu Geng 武庚

== Zhou dynasty ==
This is a family tree for the Zhou dynasty, descendants of Duke Wu of Zhou who overthrew the last Shang ruler, thereby establishing the dynasty. Ruling from 1046 BC to 256 BC, it is notable as the longest dynasty in Chinese history, although the actual political and military control of China by the dynasty only lasted during the Western Zhou.

Zhou dynasty kings

Emperor Ku 嚳
Houji 后稷
Buzhu 不窋
Ju 鞠
Duke Liu 公劉
Qingjie 慶節
Huangpu 皇僕
Chaifu 差弗
Huiyu 毀渝
Duke Fei 公非
Gaoyu 高圉
Yayu 亞圉
Gong Shu Zulei 公叔祖類; Duke Uncle Zulei
Old Duke Danfu; King Tai of Zhou 周太王
Jili 季歷; King Ji of Zhou	Taibo 吳泰伯 (founder of Wu)	Zhongyong 仲雍 (ancestor of the kings of Wu)
Guo Zhong 虢仲	Guo Shu 虢叔	King Wen of Zhou 文王 (1099–1050 BC)	State of Wu	State of Wu
Bo Yikao 伯邑考	King Wu 武王; 1050/1046–1043BC	Duke of Zhou 周公旦
King Cheng 成王 (1042–1021 BC)	Tang Shuyu 唐叔虞; Marquis of Tang; 1042–? BC	Bo Qin 伯禽
King Kang 康王 (1021–995 BC)	Marquis Xie of Jin 晉侯燮	State of Lu
King Zhao 昭王 (995–976 BC)	State of Jin
King Mu 穆王 (976–921 BC)
King Gong 共王 (921–909 BC)	King Xiao 孝王 (884–875 BC)
King Yi 懿王 (909–884 BC)
King Yi 夷王 (875–864 BC)
King Li 厲王 (864–841 BC)	Gonghe 共和 (Regent: 841–828 BC)
King Xuan 宣王 (827–782 BC)	Duke Huan 鄭桓公 of Zheng; 806–771 BC
King Xie 携王 c. 770–750 BCE	King You 幽王 (781–771 BC)	Bao Si 褒姒	State of Zheng
King Ping 平王 (771–720 BC)	Bofu 伯服 ?–771CE
Taizi; Xiefu 太子泄父
King Huan 桓王 (720–697 BC)
King Zhuang 莊王 (697–682 BC)
King Xi 僖王 (682–677 BC)	Prince Tui 王子颓
King Hui 惠王 (677–652 BC)
King Xiang 襄王 (651–619 BC	Prince Dai 王子带
King Qing 頃王 (618–613 BC)
King Kuang 匡王 (612–607 BC)	King Ding 定王 (606–586 BC)
King Jian 簡王 (585–572 BC)
King Ling 靈王 (571–545 BC)
King Jing 景王 (544–520 BC)
Prince Chao 王子朝	King Dao 悼王 (520 BC)	King Jing 敬王 (520–476 BC)
King Yuan 元王 (475–469 BC)
King Zhending 貞定王 (468–441 BC)
King Ai 哀王 (441 BC)	King Si 思王 (441 BC)	King Kao 考王 (440–426 BC)	Duke Huan of West Zhou 西周桓公
King Weilie 威烈王 (425–402 BC)	Duke Wei of West Zhou 西周威公
King An 安王 (401–376 BC)	Duke Hui of West Zhou 西周惠公	Prince Ban 班 Duke Hui of East Zhou 東周惠公
King Lie 烈王 (375–369 BC)	King Xian 顯王 (368–321 BC)	Duke Wu of West Zhou 西周武公
King Shenjing 慎靚王 (320–315 BC)
King Nan 赧王 (314–256 BC)
