= List of state leaders in the 19th century BC =

State leaders in the 20th century BC – State leaders in the 18th century BC – State leaders by year

This is a list of state leaders in the 19th century BC (1900–1801 BC).

== Africa: Northeast ==
Kush

- Kingdom of Kush (complete list) –

- Kaa, King (c.1900 BC)
- Teriahi, King (c.1880 BC)
- Awawa, King (c.1870 BC)
- Utatrerses, King (c.1850 BC)

Egypt

- Twelfth Dynasty of Middle Kingdom Egypt (complete list) –

- Amenemhat I, King (1991–1962 BC)
- Senusret I, King (1971–1926 BC)
- Amenemhat II, King (1914–1879/6 BC, 1878–1843 BC, or 1877/6–1843/2 BC)
- Senusret II, King (1897–1878 BC)
- Senusret III, King (1878–1839 BC)
- Amenemhat III, King (1860–1814 BC)
- Amenemhat IV, King (1822–1812 BC)
- Sobekneferu, Queen (1806–1802 BC)

- Thirteenth Dynasty of Second Intermediate Period Egypt (complete list) –

- Sekhemre Khutawy Sobekhotep, King (1803–1800 BC)

- Fourteenth Dynasty of the Second Intermediate Period (complete list) –

- Yakbim Sekhaenre, King (1805–1780 BC)

== Asia: East ==
=== Asia: East ===
China

Type	Name	Title	Royal house	From	To	Refs
Sovereign	Xie	King	Xia dynasty	1906 BC	1890 BC	
Sovereign	Bu Jiang	King	Xia dynasty	1890 BC	1831 BC	
Sovereign	Jiong	King	Xia dynasty	1831 BC	1810 BC	
Sovereign	Jin	King	Xia dynasty	1810 BC	1789 BC	

=== Asia: Southeast ===
Vietnam

- Hồng Bàng dynasty (complete list) –

- Tốn line, (c.1912–c.1713 BC)

=== Asia: West ===
Assyria

- Assyria: Old Period

Type	Name	Title	Royal house	From	To	Refs
Sovereign	Sargon I	King	—	1920 BC	1881 BC	
Sovereign	Erishum I	King	—	Around 1905 BC?	1867 BC	
Sovereign	Naram-Suen	King	—	1872 BC	1844 BC	
Sovereign	Ikunum	King	—	1867 BC	1860 BC	
Sovereign	Puzur-Ashur II	King	—	1865 BC	1857 BC	
Sovereign	Erishum II	King	—	1819 BC or 1815 BC	1814 BC or 1809 BC	
Sovereign	Shamshi-Adad I	King	—	1813 BC	1791 BC or 1781 BC	

Babylonia

- Babylonia

Type	Name	Title	Royal house	From	To	Refs
Sovereign	Sumu-abum	King	First dynasty	1830 BC	1817 BC	
Sovereign	Sumu-la-El	King	First dynasty	1817 BC	1781 BC	

Elam

- Elam

Type	Name	Title	Royal house	From	To	Refs
Sovereign	Atta-hushu	Sukkal and Ippir of Susa, Shepherd of the people of Susa & Shepherd of Inshushinak	Epartid dynasty	1928 BC?	After 1894 BC	
Sovereign	Tetep-Mada	Shepherd of the people of Susa	Epartid dynasty	After around 1890 BC	?	
Sovereign	Palar-Ishshan	Sukkalmah	Epartid dynasty	?	?	
Sovereign	Kuk-Sanit	?	Epartid dynasty	?	?	
Sovereign	Kuk-Kirwash	Sukkalmah & Sukkal of Elam, Simashki and Susa	Epartid dynasty	?	?	
Sovereign	Tem-Sanit	?	Epartid dynasty	?	?	
Sovereign	Kuk-Nahhunte	?	Epartid dynasty	?	?	
Sovereign	Kuk-Nashur II	Sukkalmah & Sukkal of Elam and Simashki and Susa	Epartid dynasty	?	?	
