= 440s BC =

Decade

This article concerns the period 449 BC – 440 BC.

== Events ==
=== 449 BC ===
==== By place ====
====== Greece ======
- The Greek city-states make peace with the Persian Empire through the Peace of Callias, named after Callias II, the chief Greek ambassador to the Persian Court, an Athenian who is a brother-in-law of Cimon. Athens agrees to end its support for the Egyptian rebels still holding out in parts of the Nile Delta, while the Persians agree not to send ships of war into the Aegean Sea. Athens now effectively controls all the Greek city states in Ionia.
- Pericles begins a great building plan including the re-fortification of Athens main port Piraeus and its long walls extending to Athens main city.
- Pericles proposes a "Congress Decree" allowing the use of 9,000 talents to finance the massive rebuilding program of Athenian temples. This leads to a meeting ("Congress") of all Greek states in order to consider the question of rebuilding the temples destroyed by the Persians. The Congress fails because of Sparta's opposition.
- Pericles places the Athenian sculptor Phidias in charge of all the artistic aspects of his reconstruction program. Construction begins on the Temple of Hephaestus in Athens, while the Athenian Senate commissions Callicrates to construct a temple to Athena Nike on the Acropolis.
- The Second Sacred War erupts between Athens and Sparta, when Sparta forcefully detaches Delphi from Phocis and renders it independent.

====== Rome ======
- The Law of the Twelve Tables (developed by the Decemvirates) is formally promulgated in 450 B.C. The Twelve Tables are literally drawn up on twelve ivory tablets which are posted in the Forum Romanum so that all Romans can read and know them.
- When the Decemvirate's term of office expires, the decemviri refuse to leave office or permit successors to take office. Appius Claudius Crassus is said to have made an unjust decision which would have forced a young woman named Verginia into prostitution, prompting her father to kill her. This leads to an uprising against the Decemvirate forcing the decemviri to resign their offices. The ordinary magistrates (magistratus ordinarii) are re-instituted. Appius Claudius is said to have committed suicide as a result of these events.

==== By topic ====
====== Literature ======
- Herodotus completes his History, which records the events concerning the Persian War.

=== 448 BC ===
==== By place ====
====== Greece ======
- Pericles leads the Athenian army against Delphi to restore the sanctuary of the oracle of Delphi to Phocis.
- The Athenians begin constructing the middle component of the Long Walls from their main city to its port of Piraeus.

====== Rome ======
- Following the co-optation of two patricians to the office of Tribune of the Plebs, the tribune Lucius Trebonius Asper introduces the Lex Trebonia, a law forbidding tribunes from co-opting their colleagues in the future.

=== 447 BC ===
==== By place ====
====== Greece ======
- Pericles leads Athenian forces in the expulsion of barbarians from the Thracian peninsula of Gallipoli, in order to establish Athenian colonists in the region. Thus Pericles starts a policy of cleruchy (klerouchos) or "out-settlements". This is a form of colonisation where poor and unemployed people are assisted to emigrate to new regions.
- A revolt breaks out in Boeotia as the oligarchs of Thebes conspire against the democratic faction in the city. The Athenians, under their general Tolmides, with 1000 hoplites plus other troops from their allies, march into Boeotia to take back the towns revolting against Athenian control. They capture Chaeronea, but are attacked and defeated by the Boeotians at Coronea. As a result, the Athenians are forced to give up control of Boeotia as well as Phocis and Locris, which all fall under the control of hostile oligarchs who quit the Delian League.
- The middle component of the Long Walls from Athens to the port of Piraeus is completed.

==== By subject ====
====== Literature ======
- Achaeus of Eretria, a Greek playwright, produces his first play.

====== Architecture ======
- Pericles commissions the architects Kallikrates and Iktinos to design a larger temple for the Parthenon and the construction begins on rebuilding the great temple of Athena (the Parthenon) on the Acropolis at Athens soon afterwards.

=== 446 BC ===
==== By place ====
====== Greece ======
- Achaea achieves its independence from Athens, while Euboea, crucial to Athenian control of the sea and food supplies, revolts against Athens. Pericles crosses over to Euboea with his troops.
- Megara joins the revolt against Athens. The strategic importance of Megara is immediately demonstrated by the appearance, for the first time in 12 years, of a Spartan army under King Pleistoanax in Attica. The threat from the Spartan army leads Pericles to arrange, by bribery and by negotiation, that Athens will give up its mainland possessions and confine itself to a largely maritime empire.
- The Spartan army retires, so Pericles crosses back to Euboea with 50 ships and 5,000 soldiers, cracking down any opposition. He punishes the landowners of Chalcis, who lose their properties, while the residents of Histiaea are uprooted and replaced by 2,000 Athenian settlers.
- After hearing that the Spartan army had accepted bribes from Pericles, Pleistoanax, the King of Sparta, is impeached by the citizens of Sparta, but flees to exile in Arcadia. His military adviser, Cleandridas also flees and is condemned to death in his absence.

====== Sicily ======
- Ducetius, the Hellenised leader of the Siculi, an ancient people of Sicily, returns from exile in Corinth to Sicily and colonises Cale Acte on the north coast with Greek and Siculi settlers.
- Acragas declares war on Syracuse because of the return of Ducetius and is defeated by Syracuse in the Battle of the Himera River.

====== Roman Republic ======
- In the Battle of Corbione, Titus Quinctius Capitolinus Barbatus leads Roman troops to a victory over the Aequi of north-east Latium and the Volsci of southern Latium.

=== 445 BC ===
==== By place ====
====== Greece ======
- Pericles, concerned over the draining effect of years of war on Athenian manpower, looks for peace with the support of the Assembly. Athenian diplomat, Callias, goes to Sparta and after much bargaining arranges a peace treaty with Sparta and her Peloponnesian allies, thus extending the 5 year truce of 451 BC for another 30 years. According to this treaty, Megara is to be returned to the Peloponnesian League, Troezen and Achaea become independent, Aegina is to become a tributary to Athens but autonomous, and disputes are to be settled by arbitration. Each party agrees to respect the alliances of the other.

====== Roman Republic ======
- A new law, the Lex Canuleia removes the ban on inter-marriage of the Roman classes, i.e. plebeian with patrician.
- The Plebeians demand the right to stand for election as consul but the Roman senate refused to grant them this right. Ultimately, a compromise is reached, and consular command authority is granted to Consular Tribunes ("Military Tribunes with Consular powers" or tribuni militares consulari potestate).

=== 444 BC ===
==== By place ====
====== Greece ======
- The conservative and democratic factions in Athens confront each other. The ambitious new leader of the conservatives, Thucydides, accuses the leader of the democratic faction, Pericles, of profligacy and criticises the way Pericles is spending money on his ambitious building plans for the city. Thucydides manages, initially, to gain the support of the ecclesia. Pericles responds by proposing to reimburse the city for all the expenses from his private property, on the condition that he would make the inscriptions of dedication in his own name. His stance is supported by the ecclesia, so Thucydides' efforts to dislodge Pericles from power are defeated.

====== Persian empire ======
- Nehemiah, the Jewish cupbearer to Artaxerxes I at Susa, is given permission by Artaxerxes to return to Jerusalem as governor of Judea, in order to rebuild parts of it.

=== 443 BC ===
==== By place ====
====== Roman Republic ======
- No consuls are elected in Rome, but rather military tribunes with consular power are appointed in their stead. While only patricians could be consuls, some military tribunes were plebeians. These positions had responsibility for the census, a vital function in the financial administration of Rome. So to stop the plebeians from possibly gaining control of the census, the patricians remove from the consuls and tribunes the right to take the census, and rather entrust it to two magistrates, called censores who were to be chosen exclusively from the patricians in Rome.

====== Italy ======
- Pericles founds the colony of Thurii near the site of the former city of Sybaris, in southern Italy. Its colonists include Herodotus and Lysias.

=== 442 BC ===
==== By place ====
====== Greece ======
- As a result of his failure to effectively challenge Pericles, the Athenian citizens ostracise Thucydides for 10 years and Pericles is once again unchallenged in Athenian politics.

==== By topic ====
====== Literature ======
- Sophocles writes Antigone.

=== 441 BC ===
==== By place ====
====== China ======
- Zhou Ai Wang becomes king of the Zhou dynasty of China but dies before the year's end, to be succeeded by Zhou Si Wang.

==== By topic ====
====== Literature ======
- The Greek playwright, Euripides, wins his first victory in a dramatic festival.
- The Greek playwright Sophocles writes Antigone.

=== 440 BC ===
==== By place ====
====== Greece ======
- Samos, an autonomous member of the Delian League and one of Athens' principal allies with a substantial fleet of its own, quarrels with Miletus. Miletus, also a member of the Delian League, appeals to Athens for assistance. Pericles decides in favour of Miletus, so Samos revolts. Pericles then sails to Samos with a fleet to overthrow its oligarchic government and install a democratic one. Sparta threatens to interfere. However, at a congress of the Peloponnesian League, its members vote not to intervene on behalf of Samos against Athens.

The Histories by Herodotus was written that contain the knowledge of the Greco Persian wars.

====== Roman Republic ======
- A famine strikes in Rome.

====== China ======
- Zhou Kao Wang becomes king of the Zhou dynasty of China.

==== By topic ====
====== Physics ======
- Democritus proposes the existence of indivisible particles, which he calls atoms.

====== Art ======
- Polykleitos completes one of his greatest statues, the Doryphorus (The Spear Bearer) (approximate date).
- The stela, Demeter, Persephone and Triptolemos, from Eleusis, is made (approximate date). It is now kept at the National Archaeological Museum of Athens.
- A temple for Poseidon is erected in Sounion.

== Births ==
448 BC

- Bardyllis, king of Dardania (d. 358 BC)

446 BC

- Aristophanes, Greek playwright (approximate year) (d. c. 385 BC)
- Marcus Furius Camillus, Roman soldier and statesman (traditional date) (d. 365 BC)

445 BC

- Approximate date – Antisthenes, Athenian philosopher (d. c.365 BC)

440 BC

- Cynisca, Greek princess of Sparta

== Deaths ==
449 BC

- Appius Claudius Crassus, former decemvir (suicide)

446 BC

- Cleinias, a close relative of Roman politician and military commander Alcibiades. (approximate year) (b. disputed)

444 BC

- Udayin, king of Magadha in ancient India.

443 BC

- Duke Ligong of Qin, 22nd ruler of the Zhou dynasty
- Pindar, Greek poet (b. 522 BC)

442 BC

- Zhou zhen ding wang, king of the Zhou dynasty of China

441 BC

- King Zhending of Zhou, 28th king of the Zhou dynasty of China
- King Ai of Zhou, 29th king of the Zhou dynasty of China
- King Si of Zhou, 30th king of the Zhou dynasty of China

440 BC

- Ducetius, a Hellenized leader of the Sicels and founder of a united Sicilian state
- Ezra, Jewish scribe and priest (b. c. 480 BCE)
- Amestris, Achaemenid queen (approximate date)
