= 520 (disambiguation) =

520 may refer to:

- 520 AD, a Gregorian calendar year
- 520 BC, a pre-Gregorian calendar year
- Area code 520
- 520 (number)

== Astronomy ==
- 520 Franziska, an asteroid
- Abell 520, a galaxy cluster
- Kosmos 520, a Soviet satellite
- NGC 520, a pair of colliding spiral galaxy

== Buildings ==
- 520 Park Avenue, New York City, New York, United States
- 520 West 28th Street, New York City, New York, United States
- 520 West 41st Street, New York City, New York, United States
- 520 West End Avenue, New York City, New York, United States

== Electronics ==
- HP 520 Notebook, a business laptop
- Lenovo IdeaPad 520, a discontinued brand of notebook computers
- Nokia Lumia 520, an entry-level smartphone
- Nokia Talkman 520, a portable phone

== Literature ==
- Minuscule 520, a Greek minuscule manuscript

== Military ==
- No. 520 Squadron RAF, a meteorological squadron of the Royal Air Force
- United Nations Security Council Resolution 520

=== Equipment and vehicles ===
- Stevens Model 520, a pump-action shotgun
- USS Alacrity (MSO-520), an Ability-class minesweeper

== Transportation ==
=== Air transportation ===
- Boeing 520, a family of small turboshaft/turboprop engines

=== Automobiles ===
- Datsun 520, a 1965–1972 Japanese light commercial vehicle
- Fiat 520, a 1921–1923, 1927–1930 Italian luxury car series
- Lifan 520, a 2006–2012 Chinese compact sedan

=== Rail transportation ===
- South Australian Railways 520 class
- Tin Sau stop, Hong Kong (station code)

=== Roads and routes ===
- List of highways numbered 520
- Evergreen Point Floating Bridge, commonly called "520 bridge"

== Other uses ==
- An amorous expression in Chinese Internet slang, sometimes associated with the date 5-20

== See also ==
- 520th (disambiguation)
- 5200 (disambiguation)
