= 441 BC =

441 BC in various calendars
Gregorian calendar	441 BC; CDXLI BC
Ab urbe condita	313
Ancient Egypt era	XXVII dynasty, 85
Pharaoh	Artaxerxes I of Persia, 25
Ancient Greek Olympiad (summer)	84th Olympiad, year 4
Assyrian calendar	4310
Balinese saka calendar	N/A
Bengali calendar	−1034 – −1033
Berber calendar	510
Buddhist calendar	104
Burmese calendar	−1078
Byzantine calendar	5068–5069
Chinese calendar	己亥年 (Earth Pig); 2257 or 2050 — to — 庚子年 (Metal Rat); 2258 or 2051
Coptic calendar	−724 – −723
Discordian calendar	726
Ethiopian calendar	−448 – −447
Hebrew calendar	3320–3321
- Hindu calendars
Vikram Samvat	−384 – −383
Shaka Samvat	N/A
Kali Yuga	2660–2661
Holocene calendar	9560
Iranian calendar	1062 BP – 1061 BP
Islamic calendar	1095 BH – 1094 BH
Javanese calendar	N/A
Julian calendar	N/A
Korean calendar	1893
Minguo calendar	2352 before ROC 民前2352年
Nanakshahi calendar	−1908
Thai solar calendar	102–103
Tibetan calendar	阴土猪年 (female Earth-Pig) −314 or −695 or −1467 — to — 阳金鼠年 (male Iron-Rat) −313 or −694 or −1466

Year 441 BC was a year of the pre-Julian Roman calendar. At the time, it was known as the Year of the Consulship of Fusus and Crassus (or, less frequently, year 313 Ab urbe condita). The denomination 441 BC for this year has been used since the early medieval period, when the Anno Domini calendar era became the prevalent method in Europe for naming years.

== Events ==
=== By place ===
==== China ====
- Zhou Ai Wang becomes king of the Zhou dynasty of China but dies before the year's end, to be succeeded by Zhou Si Wang.

=== By topic ===
==== Literature ====
- The Greek playwright, Euripides, wins his first victory in a dramatic festival.
- The Greek playwright Sophocles writes Antigone.

== Deaths ==
- King Zhending of Zhou, 28th king of the Zhou dynasty of China
- King Ai of Zhou, 29th king of the Zhou dynasty of China
- King Si of Zhou, 30th king of the Zhou dynasty of China
