= Duke Wen of Eastern Zhou =

Chinese Zhou dynasty ruler from 255 BC to 249 BC

King Hui of Zhou

King of China
- Reign: 255–249 BC
- Predecessor: King Nan of Zhou
- Successor: Remaining elements of Zhou dynasty dissolved
- Died: 249 BC
Names
- Ancestral name: Jī (姬); Given name: Jié (杰)
- House: Zhou dynasty

Duke Wen of Eastern Zhou (Chinese: 東周文公; pinyin: Dōng Zhōu Wén Gōng) (?–249 BC), personal name Jī Jié, reigned as King Hui of Zhou over the remaining rump state of the Zhou dynasty from 255 BC to 249 BC, when he was captured and executed by the army of Qin. Wen was the last member of the Zhou dynasty who claimed the throne of China, though he was never recognized as king outside his own small domain at Chengzhou. Forced to spend his entire reign fighting against the state of Qin, Wen's death meant the final end of the Zhou dynasty.

== Life ==
Jī Jié was born into the large royal Jī family that ruled China since 1046 BC, though by his time the dynasty had become effectively powerless. Their remaining crown land was embroiled in infighting and succession disputes, so that it was split into two factions, led by rival nobles: Western Zhou and Eastern Zhou. Jié, as Duke Wen, ruled over the East from Chengzhou, and largely ignored the authority of King Nan of Zhou who resided in Wangcheng and was supported by the western nobles. In 256 BC, however, war broke out between West Zhou under Nan and the state of Qin under King Zhaoxiang of Qin. Qin annexed the West, deposed King Nan and forcibly ended the Zhou dynasty. Many citizens and members of the royal family then fled to East Zhou, where they proclaimed Wen as the King of China (Son of Heaven) in 255 BC.

Allied with Ji Zhao, son of King Nan, Wen organized a resistance against Qin, and managed to preserve the last Zhou holdouts for six years. Ji Zhao's forces were defeated in 251 BC, and two years later the army of Qin took Chengzhou. Wen was executed, and the city given to Lü Buwei for his services to King Zhuangxiang of Qin. The remaining Jī family members fled to the State of Wey.
