= Ji Wei =

Ji Wei may refer to:

- King Kao of Zhou (died 426 BC), personal name Ji Wei
- Ji Wei (hurdler) (born 1984), Chinese hurdler
