= Western Zhou (state) =

Ancient Chinese state during the Warring States period

State of Western Zhou 西周
- 440 BCE–256 BCE
- Status: Duchy
- Capital: Henan Wangcheng
- Common languages: Old Chinese
- Government: Monarchy
- History
  - Established: 440 BCE
  - Annexed by Qin: 256 BCE

Western Zhou (Chinese: 西周) was an ancient Chinese state during the Warring States period. Its capital was Henan (河南), located just west of present-day Luoyang, a prefecture-level city in Henan Province.

The Duchy of Western Zhou was established by Prince Jie (王子揭) in 440 BC. After King Kao of Zhou successfully ascended the throne, Prince Jie (aka Duke Huan of Western Zhou), a younger brother of King Kao was given a fief centred on Henan.

In 367 BC, Duchy of Eastern Zhou won independence from Western Zhou. The two tiny duchies attacked each other. The kings of Zhou had lost almost all political and military power, even their remaining crown land was occupied by the two tiny duchies.

Western Zhou was attacked by Qin in 256 BC, just after King Nan of Zhou plotted with the states of Chu and Yan for a failed joint expedition against Qin. Duke Wu of Western Zhou surrendered, but was released by the king of Qin. In the same year, both Duke Wu and King Nan died. Qin deposed the last duke of Western Zhou and exiled him to Zhonghu (忠狐, located just northwest of present-day Ruzhou), the duchy was annexed by Qin.

== List of Duke of Western Zhou ==
Name	Given name	Reign	Notes
Duke Huan of Western Zhou (西周桓公)	Jie (揭)	440–415 BC	son of King Zhending of Zhou
Duke Wei of Western Zhou (西周威公)	Zao (竈)	414–367 BC	son of Duke Huan
Duke Hui of Western Zhou (西周惠公)	Chao (朝) or Zai (宰)	366 BC–?	son of Duke Wei
Duke Wu of Western Zhou (西周武公)	unknown	?–256 BC	son of Duke Hui
Duke Wen of Western Zhou (西周文公)	Jiu (咎)	256 BC	son of Duke Wu last duke of Western Zhou
