= King Gao =

King Gao may refer to:

- Gao of Xia
- Go of Balhae
