= 520th =

520th may refer to:

- 520th Air Defense Group, disbanded United States Air Force organization
- 520th Fighter-Interceptor Squadron, inactive United States Air Force unit

== See also ==
- 520 (number)
- 520 (disambiguation)
- 520, the year 520 (DXX) of the Julian calendar
- 520 BC
