= King Nan of Zhou =

Zhou Dynasty king of China from 314 to 256 BC

King Nan of Zhou 周赧王

King of the Zhou dynasty
- Reign: 314–256 BC
- Predecessor: King Shenjing of Zhou
- Successor: Title officially extinct, though claimed by King Hui of Zhou
- Died: 256 BC
- Issue: Jī Wen; Jī Zhao
Names
- Ji Yan (姬延) or Ji Dan (姬誕)
Posthumous name
- King Nan (赧王) or King Yin (隱王)
- House: Ji
- Dynasty: Zhou (Eastern Zhou)
- Father: King Shenjing of Zhou

King Nan of Zhou

Posthumous name
- Chinese: 周赧王
- Literal meaning: The Blushing King of Zhou; The Ruddy King of Zhou
Transcriptions
Standard Mandarin
- Hanyu Pinyin: Zhōu Nǎn Wáng
- Wade–Giles: Chou Nan-wang; King Nan of Chou

Second alternative Chinese name
- Literal meaning: The Beclouded King of Zhou
Transcriptions
Standard Mandarin
- Hanyu Pinyin: Zhou Yin Wang
- Wade–Giles: Chou Yin-wang; King Yin of Chou

Personal name
- Chinese: 姬延
Transcriptions
Standard Mandarin
- Hanyu Pinyin: Ji Yan
- Wade–Giles: Chi Yen

King Nan (Note: Nan is not a title but a sort of cognomen (e.g. "The Timid" or "The Dishonorable.") At times he is referred to as "Lord of Zhou" or just "The King." The Bamboo Annals call him King Yin, (隱王) meaning "the Beclouded.") of Zhou (?–256 BC), personal name Ji Yan, also less commonly known as King Yin of Zhou, was the 37th and last king of the Zhou dynasty of China. He was the son of King Shenjing and grandson of King Xian. He was king from 314 BC until his death in 256 BC, a reign of fifty-nine years, the longest in the Zhou dynasty and all of pre-imperial China.

By the time of King Nan's reign, the king of Zhou had lost almost all political and military power, as even their remaining crown land was split into two states, led by rival feudal lords: Western Zhou state, where the capital Wangcheng was located, and Eastern Zhou state, centred at Chengzhou. (Note: The exact location of Wangcheng and its relation to Chengzhou is disputed and confusing. According to Xu Zhaofeng, "Chengzhou" and "Wangcheng" were originally synonymous and used to name several Zhou capitals of the Spring and Autumn period. "The creation of a distinction between Wangcheng and Chengzhou probably occurred during the reign of King Jing", under whom a new capital "Chengzhou" was built to the east of the old city "Wangcheng". Nevertheless, the new Chengzhou was still sometimes called Wangcheng and vice versa, adding to the confusion.) Therefore, King Nan lacked any personal territory and was effectively under the control of the local feudal lords, essentially relying on their charity.

However, Nan's symbolic and ritual power remains disputed. On one side, the feudal states largely ignored the king's activities and adopted royal titles and rituals for themselves, while the Zhou dynasty's fall generally received meagre contemporary coverage and attention. This led to the assumption that King Nan no longer had any symbolic power or semblance of royal authority left. On the other side, recent epigraphic discoveries and some accounts in the Records of the Grand Historian and Strategies of the Warring States suggest that until his death, King Nan was still respected as the Son of Heaven. Either way, the last king of Zhou managed to preserve his weakened dynasty through diplomacy and conspiracies for fifty-nine years until his deposition by the Qin state and death in 256 BC.

== Life ==
=== Reign ===
At the beginning of his reign in 314 BC, King Nan moved the capital from Chengzhou to Wangcheng. From then on, the Zhou crown lands were invaded several times by foreign powers, beginning with Qin's attack on Yiyang in West Zhou in 307 BC. Only constant political manoeuvring and ever-changing alliances of the king and the feudal lords ensured the survival of West and East Zhou, even though the two Zhou states often weakened themselves by conspiring against each other. Once, Qin planned to march its troops through East and West Zhou to attack Han, so that the lords of Zhou feared to be caught in war between the two states. The Scribe Yan advised King Nan that it would be of advantage if Han would cede some territory to Zhou and Zhou send some hostages to Chu. Qin would then suspect the state of Chu was planning an attack on Qin during its campaign against Han. At the same time the king of Zhou should, as Yan suggested, explain to the king of Qin that Han suspected Zhou of conspiring with Qin because of the present of land made to Zhou. With this method the king of Zhou would increase his territory and avoid Qin troops marching through his land. On another occasion, King Nan was summoned to Qin's royal court to debate the question of attacking the Han city of Nanyang. Instead of following the request, Nan conspired with Han to block the way between Zhou and Qin in order to prevent the debate and avoid a war.

King Nan's rule was not only threatened by outside powers, but also by the constant conflict between the lords of West and East Zhou. When they went to war, the state of Han initially supported West Zhou's nobles, but went on to betray its allies. Instead of fighting East Zhou, the Han forces looted Wangcheng and Nan's royal palace, while avoiding war with the Son of Heaven, King Nan, as they were still officially "allies". As Zhou grew increasingly weak, the king's rule was more frequently challenged by expansionist Qin. In 273 BC Ma Fan developed a plan to protect the Nine Tripod Cauldrons of Yu the Great representing royal authority by enlisting the help of King Anxi of Wei, who constructed a fortification wall for Zhou. Nevertheless, the Zhou dynasty remained unable to stop Qin's expansion, and Nan's kingdom was only spared because the rulers of Qin believed that the annihilation of the land of the Son of Heaven would damage their names. In order to survive, Nan and his officials even used to function as a spy for Qin in explaining the military changes in the state of Han, Wei and Zhao.

=== Fall ===
Only when Qin occupied the town of Fushu, belonging to Han, but in the vicinity of the ancient royal capital, Nan and the lords of West Zhou became so frightened of an impending invasion that they joined an alliance against Qin. West Zhou attacked Qin, but was quickly driven back. Wangcheng was finally conquered in 256 BC, and King Nan travelled to Xianyang to submit to King Zhaoxiang of Qin. West Zhou was then annexed by Qin, whereupon Nan was demoted to Duke of West Zhou. Imprisoned in Wangcheng, he died shortly afterwards, "and the rituals of the Zhou dynasty ceased forever". Qin seized the Nine Tripod Cauldrons and exiled Nan's heir, Ji Wen, to Danhu. Both the royal Ji family and many citizens of West Zhou then fled to East Zhou, where they and the local lords proclaimed Duke Wen of Eastern Zhou the new king. Duke Wen was never recognized king outside of East Zhou, however, so that Nan is generally considered the last rightful King of Zhou. Together with Nan's son Ji Zhao, Wen led the resistance against Qin, but they were defeated in 251 and 249 BC, respectively. East Zhou was annexed by Qin, and none of Nan's sons subsequently laid claim to the Zhou dynastic imperial title. The remaining royal Ji family fled to the State of Wey. Thus ended the Zhou dynasty, whose fall was hardly noted by the people and states of China. However, soon after Nan's death a king of Qin lamented the dynasty's fall as disruptive for the order of Heaven and Earth. Likewise, the scholars of Qin wrote in the Lüshi Chunqiu:

"Nowadays, the house of Zhou has been destroyed, [the line of] the Sons of Heaven has been severed. There is no greater turmoil than the absence of the Son of Heaven; without the Son of Heaven, the strong overcome the weak, the many lord it over the few, they use arms to harm each other having no rest."

The title of "Son of Heaven" was eventually adopted by Qin Shi Huang, when he proclaimed himself the First Emperor.

== See also ==
1. Family tree of ancient Chinese emperors
2. Duke Wen of Eastern Zhou — the last Zhou ruler and claimant to the throne

== Notes ==
King Nan of Zhou Zhou dynasty Died: 256 BC
Regnal titles
Preceded by King Shenjing of Zhou	King of China; 314–256 BC	Vacant Qin's wars of unification Title next held by Qin Shi Huang as Emperor of China
