= Huai Emperor =

Huaidi, Huai Di, Emperor Huai, or the Huai Emperor may refer to:

- Huai of Xia (Chinese: 槐, Huái), a semilegendary monarch of the Xia dynasty
- Emperor Huai of Jin (懷, Huái), an early 4th-century monarch
