= King Si =

King Si may refer to:

- King Si of Zhou (died 441 BC), king of the Eastern Zhou dynasty
- Shi Xie (137–226), honoured as King Si in Vietnam
