= Wu Xian (diviner) =

Chinese shaman and astronomer

- 巫咸
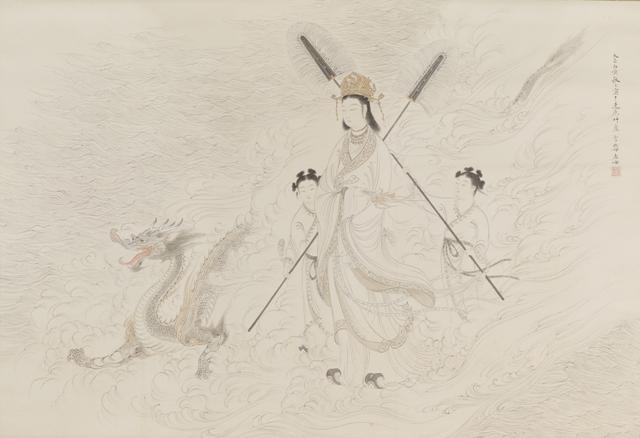
- Risō by Reika Kikkawa (right scroll), argued to depict Wu Xian descending to guide the poet.
- Born: Mt. Yu (虞山)
- Occupation: Diviner (巫)
- Known for: Divination, serving Tai Wu
- Monarch: Tai Wu

Chinese name
- Chinese: 巫咸
Transcriptions
Standard Mandarin
- Wade–Giles: wu^{1} hsien^{2}
Middle Chinese
- Middle Chinese: mju haem
Old Chinese
- Baxter–Sagart (2014): /*C.m(r)[o] [ɡ]ˤr[ə]m/
- Zhengzhang: /*ma ɡrɯːm/

Wu Xian (Chinese: 巫咸) was a Chinese shaman who practiced divination, prayer, sacrifice, rainmaking, and healing during the Shang dynasty (c. 1250 BCE, Anyang period), serving under king Tai Wu.

Wu Xian is considered one of the more prominent ancient Chinese astronomers, alongside Warring States (403–221 BC) figures such as Gan De and Shi Shen. They (Note: Wu Xian's gender is not known.) were also represented as one of the "Three Astronomical Traditions" on the Dunhuang map during the Tang dynasty (618–907).

== Name ==
The wū 巫 defines Wu Xian's profession as a Shang dynasty diviner. The term originally described a unisex role, but had come to be regarded as a role for women come the Zhou dynasty within which Wu Xian is discussed. The masculine term would be xí (覡). Given this, Wu Xian essentially means "Diviner Xian."

== Life ==
Little is known about the actual life of Wu Xian as they pertain to the Shang dynasty. This is because their name has not been tied to Oracle bone mentions and, being from the days of Tai Wu, they predate the Late Shang that extant Oracle bones date to. Therefore, study of Wu Xian's life is restricted to texts from the Zhou dynasty and beyond.

The account that can be placed earliest in Wu Xian's life is in the Lost Book of Yue (越絕書):

虞山者，巫咸所出也。虞故神出奇怪。去縣百五里。
Mt. Yu is where Wu Xian came from. The region of Yu is therefore a godly place where strange phenomena occurs. Mt. Yu is 500 li from the county.

The Classic of Mountains and Seas also mentions Wu Xian as coming from a mountain. In Lunheng, Han dynasty scholar Wang Chong mentions that Wu Xian was born to the south of the River Yangtze and use blessings to cure one's ailments and misfortunes. He also says that immense qi comes from the south of the River Yangtze, thus their abilities.

The Bamboo Annals bears a single mention of Wu Xian:

十一年，命巫咸禱于山川。
In the 11th year, [Tai Wu] ordered Wu Xian to pray at the mountains and rivers.

Sima Qian writes about Wu Xian, who was assigned the post of astronomer for Shang, as having managed the royal household of Shang admirably, and writing a treatise. In the Annals of Yin, Tai Wu and Yi Zhi, the son of Yi Yin, had noticed a stalk of grain and a mulberry tree growing in the royal court of Bo (亳). Considering it an omen, Yi Zhi advised Tai Wu to cultivate virtue, was made Prime Minister, and went to consult Wu Xian. Wu Xian then wrote "Xian on Mugwort" (咸艾) and a poem about Tai Wu, managed the royal house, and the grain and tree withered away. Tai Wu was overjoyed and praised Yi Zhi at a temple, saying Yi Zhi was not a mere minister, but Yi Zhi refused the compliment, composing "The Original Order" (原命). It was from then-on that Tai Wu was given the epithet Zhong Zong (中宗) "Central Master."

== In the Chinese classics ==
Wu Xian is mentioned in myriad places in the Chinese classics.

Legalist philosopher Han Fei cites a proverb in his eponymous book regarding Wu Xian:

巫咸雖善祝，不能自祓也
While Wu Xian is skilled in blessings, he cannot heal himself.

In Shuowen Jiezi, Wu Xian is noted as having created the field of divination:

巫：祝也。女能事無形，以舞降神者也。象人兩褎舞形。與工同意。古者巫咸初作巫。凡巫之屬皆从巫。
巫: Means zhu 祝 "blessing, blesser, protection, divine, diviner". It refers to a woman who can serve the formless (spirits) and causes spirits to descend by means of dancing. It depicts a person with two sleeves dancing. It shares meaning with gong 工 "work/skill". In antiquity, Wu Xian was the first to create the wu [role]. All characters belonging to the wu category take 巫 as their radical.

Xu Shen heavily implies that Wu Xian is a woman, which has drawn debate in academia. In the Shang dynasty, wu 巫 was a unisex role (thus "Diviner Xian"), but come the Zhou dynasty, it had been split into wu for women, and xi (覡) for men, as mentioned in Guoyu several centuries earlier.

Wu Xian famously appears in Li Sao (離騷), a classic poem attributed to Qu Yuan.

欲從靈氛之吉占兮，心猶豫而狐疑。
I wished to follow Ling Fen's auspicious divination, but my heart was hesitant and full of doubt.

巫咸將夕降兮，懷椒糈而要之。
Wu Xian was to descend at dusk; I embraced pepper and rice and went to receive them (Wu Xian).

百神翳其備降兮，九疑繽其並迎。
The myriad deities, shadowing, all descended; the spirits of Jiuyi Mountain came in splendour to greet me.

皇剡剡其揚靈兮，告余以吉故。
Radiant and glorious, they manifested their divine power, and told me of an auspicious outcome!

曰勉陞降以上下兮，求榘矱之所同。
They said: Strive to rise and descend, going up and down, seeking a lord whose measures match your own.

湯禹嚴而求合兮，摯咎繇而能調。
Tang and Yu were reverent in seeking harmony; Yi Yin and Gao Yao worked in concord with them.

=== In the Book of Documents ===
The original Book of Documents was lost during the reign of Qin Shi Huang and rewritten from memory by Fu Sheng in a bid to preserve it. Therefore, even legitimate texts should be considered questionable.

In the Book of Shang, the forged Both Possessed Pure Virtue mentions that Yi Yin's son, Yi Zhi, praised Wu Xian and wrote "Xian's Governance" (咸乂). The legitimate text is the Announcement of Yin, which does not appear to mention this text.

The legitimate Prince Shi (君奭) chapter from the Book of Zhou mentions Wu Xian amongst other ministers who assisted Tai Wu:

在太戊，時則有若伊陟、臣扈，格于上帝；巫咸乂王家。
As for Tai Wu, in his day he had [people] like Yi Zhi, Chen Hu, of whom had lordly virtue; Wu Xian put the royal house into order.

=== In the Classic of Mountains and Seas ===
Depiction of a man from Wuxianguo (巫咸國), a mythical nation named after Wu Xian.

Bingfeng, a mythical pig said to live near Wuxianguo.

In the Classic of Mountains and Seas, Wu Xian is mentioned in two different chapters.

The Western Classic of Overseas Regions (海外西經) mentions a nation named directly after Wu Xian.

巫咸國在女丑北，右手操青蛇，左手操赤蛇，在登葆山，群巫所從上下也。并封在巫咸東，其狀如彘，前後皆有首，黑。女子國在巫咸北，兩女子居，水周之。一曰居一門中。
Wuxianguo is to the north of Nüchou. In the right hand [the people] holds an azure snake, the left hand holds a red one. It is in Dengbao Mountain, from which shamans come, descending and ascending. Also, Bingfeng is to the east of Wuxian, its appearance is like a pig, with faces on the front end and backside, black in colour. Nüziguo is to the north of Wuxianguo, two women live there surrounded by a moat. One says that there is a single gate for each building.

The Western Classic of the Great Wilderness (大荒西經) mentions a place named Lingshan (靈山, lit. "Spirit Mountain") from which many different diviners ascend and descend.

有靈山，巫咸、巫即、巫肦、巫彭、巫姑、巫真、巫禮、巫抵、巫謝、巫羅十巫，從此升降，百藥爰在。
There is Lingshan. Wu Xian, Wu Ji, Wu Yan, Wu Peng, Wu Gu, Wu Zhen, Wu Li, Wu Di, Wu Xie, and Wu Luo, all hike and descend from here. There are many kinds of herbs here too!

== In Oracle bones ==
Oracle bones mention two individuals that have been argued to be connected with Wu Xian. The main point of contention is Heji 01822正.10-13, which bears two parallel inscriptions about individuals affecting the Shang people, both with the day-name (日名) wu (戊). This implies a posthumous or temple name being used for ancestor veneration within the Shang state religion. The following are the bones in question, from x.10 to x.13.

貞惟學戊
Charge: Is it Xue Wu?
貞不惟學戊
Charge: Is it not Xue Wu?

貞惟咸戊
Charge: Is it Xian Wu?
不惟咸戊
Is it not Xian Wu?

Both Xue Wu (學戊) and Xian Wu (咸戊) have received attempted identifications with Xian Wu, as well as other figures, such as Emperor Ku and Tang of Shang.

Ding Shan made the argument that these figures could parallel the Book of Documents: Xian Wu could be Wu Xian, and Xue Wu could be Xu Xian's son, pronounced the same spelled with a different character (巫賢). However, this theory has generally not found widespread acceptance.

=== Arguments for Xian Wu ===
Xian Wu received the earliest arguments from prominent scholars such as Wang Guowei, Chen Mengjia, and Luo Zhenyu.

The initial comparison arose because Xian Wu, when read backwards, reads like Wu Xian. However, this is anachronistic, as the wu 巫 in Wu Xian is reconstructed in Old Chinese by Baxter & Sagart as /*C.m(r)[o]/, and the wu 戊 in Xian Wu's name is reconstructed as /*m(r)uʔ-s/. Therefore, in the days of the Shang dynasty, these were fundamentally different words, and not homophones as seen in modern Mandarin Chinese. As there was no reconstruction beyond Middle Chinese at the time, though, this became the traditional, and thus, consensus, interpretation.

Chen Mengjia argued that it is possible that, at some point, xian 咸 was confused with 成, and thus the name Xian Wu could be Cheng Wu 成戊. He also argued that this could be Tai Wu being sacrificed to. This led to Tsai Che-Mao arguing that this could be an early usage of the epithet Cheng Tang (成湯), a posthumous name for Tang of Shang.

Xiong Lizhang notes that Xian Wu received much, much higher sacrifices than a mere minister, implying a deified status amongst the Shang people. However, if Xian Wu were Wu Xian, one would see sacrifices to them alongside Tai Wu, similar to other ministers. Therefore, while this is a significant individual to the Shang, they may not be Wu Xian.

=== Arguments for Xue Wu ===
Xue Wu has received comparatively little attention. As the upper component for the character xue 學 bears shamanic connotations, it has been argued that this could provide a semantic connection between Wu Xian and Xue Wu. Xiong notes that Xue Wu appears to have minor deity status amongst the Shang, having appeared in various inscriptions as potentially troubling the Shang, and receiving large sacrifices.

Wang Guowei argued that this individual could be Emperor Ku.

== See also ==
- Li Sao
- Tai Wu
