= Eastern Zhou (state) =

Ancient Chinese state during the Warring States period, vassal of the Zhou dynasty

State of Eastern Zhou 東周
- 367 BCE–249 BCE
- Status: Duchy
- Capital: Gong
- Common languages: Old Chinese
- Government: Monarchy
- History
  - Independence from Western Zhou: 367 BCE
  - Annexed by Qin: 249 BCE

Eastern Zhou (Chinese: 東周) was an ancient Chinese state during the Warring States period. Its capital was Gong (鞏), located just southwest of present-day Gongyi, a county-level city in Zhengzhou of Henan Province.

Duke Hui of Western Zhou (西周惠公) succeeded his father Duke Wei in 367 BC. His younger brother Prince Gen (公子根) occupied eastern part of the state and revolted against Duke Hui. With the armed assistance of Zhao and Han, Eastern Zhou won independence from Western Zhou. The two tiny duchies attacked on each other. The kings of Zhou had lost almost all political and military power, even their remaining crown land was occupied by the two tiny duchies. Since 307 BC, Eastern Zhou became a vassal state of Qin.

Kings of Zhou lived in the state of Eastern Zhou, however, during King Nan's reign, duke of Eastern Zhou refused to pay tribute to the king and deported him to Western Zhou.

Eastern Zhou was annexed by Qin in 249 BC, the last ruler was killed by Lü Buwei due to his disloyalty to Qin.

== List of rulers ==
Name	Given name	Reign	Notes
Duke Hui of Eastern Zhou (東周惠公)	Gen (根), Ban (班) or Jie (傑)	367–360 BC	youngest son of Duke Wei of Western Zhou
Duke Wu of Eastern Zhou (東周武公)	unknown	?–?	
Lord Zhaowen of Eastern Zhou (東周昭文君)	unknown	?–?	last ruler (disputed)
Lord of Eastern Zhou? (disputed)	unknown	?–249 BC	
