= Mo Xi =

Concubine of the last ruler of xia dynasty

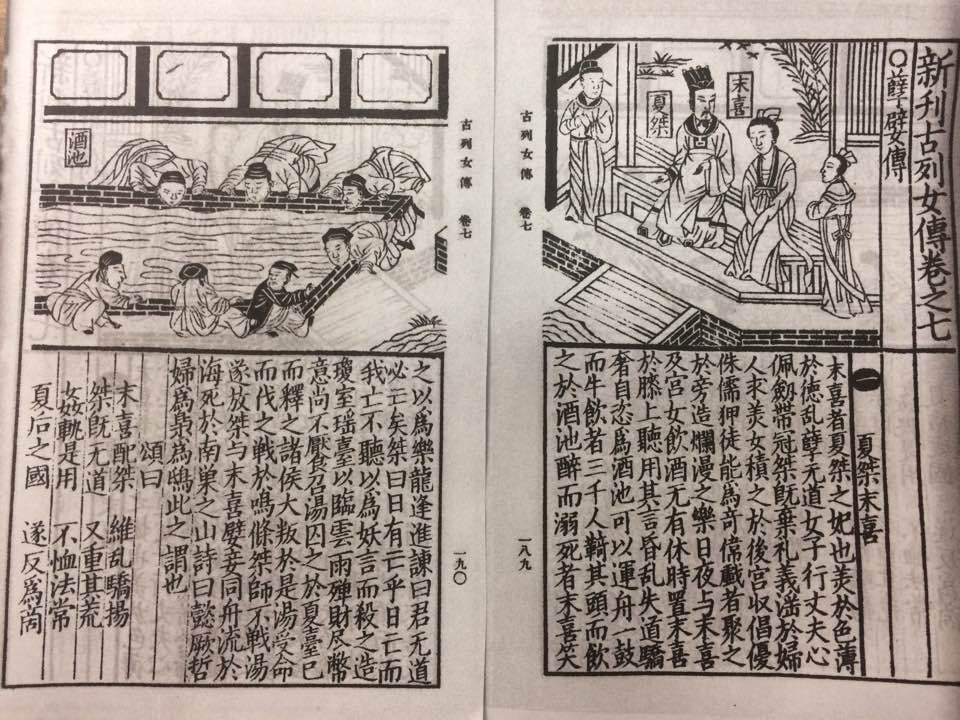
Image of Jie and Mo Xi watching men drinking from the pool of alcohol 酒池, from the Xinkan gu Lienü zhuan 新刊古列女傳 (ca. 1825) edited by Ruan Fu 阮福 (1802-?).

Mo Xi (Chinese: 妺喜; pinyin: Mò Xǐ; Wade–Giles: Mo^{4}Hsi^{3}) was a concubine of Jie, the last ruler of the Chinese Xia dynasty. According to tradition, Mo Xi, Da Ji (concubine of the last ruler of the Shang dynasty) and Bao Si (concubine of the last ruler of the Western Zhou dynasty) are each blamed for the fall of these respective dynasties. According to the Spring and Autumn Annals of Wu and Yue, “Xia fell because of Mo Xi; Yin (Shang) fell because of Da Ji; Zhou fell because of Bao Si” (夏亡以妹喜，殷亡以妲己，周亡以褒姒). Neither Mo Xi nor the Lake of Alcohol, with which she is associated, is mentioned in the story of Jie and the fall of Xia dynasty in the Records of the Grand Historian.

== Biography ==
According to the Lienü Zhuan (列女傳), Mo Xi was the concubine of Jie of Xia. She was beautiful, but lacked in virtue, being depraved and immoral. Even though her actions were those of a woman, she had the heart of a man. She wore a sword on her belt and a (man’s) cap. Jie drank day and night with Mo Xi and his palace ladies. He would place Mo Xi on his knees and listen to whatever came from her mouth. King Jie of Xia also made a lake of wine large enough to transport boats. With a drumbeat, three thousand men drank from it, lowering their faces to it like cattle. When they became drunk, they fell in and drowned. Mo Xi found this entertaining and laughed at them.

Later, Jie summoned Tang and imprisoned him at Xiatai, but afterwards released him. When the vassal lords rebelled, Tang attacked Jie and defeated him at Mingtiao. Tang banished Jie, who was set adrift out to sea on a boat along with Mo Xi and his favorite concubines. He died at Nanchao 南巢 mountain.

The account of Jie’s exile in the Lienü zhuan is different than the version found in the “Xia benji” 夏本紀 chapter of the Shiji, which not only does not mention Mo Xi, but also says, “Jie fled from Mingtiao and subsequently was exiled and died. Jie said to someone, ‘I regret failing to kill Tang at Xiatai, which has caused me to come to this’”.

According to the Guoyu, Mo Xi, who was from the state of Shi, plotted to bring down the Xia from the very beginning. “Formerly, when Jie of Xia attacked the state of Shi, the people of Shi gave Mei Xi to him. Mei Xi was favored, thereupon she colluded with Yi Yin 伊尹 and destroyed Xia” (昔夏桀伐有施，有施人以妹喜女焉，妹喜有寵，于是乎與伊尹比而亡夏).

The version of the Mo Xi’s story recorded in the Zhushu jinian 竹書紀年 (Bamboo Annals) also has her colluding with Yi Yin to bring down the Xia. “15th year (of Jie): [Gui 癸 (King Jie)] ordered Bian 扁 to attack Shan Min 山民. Shan Min presented two women to Jie, one called Wan 琬 and the other Yan 琰. The emperor loved the two, although the women bore him no children. He had their names carved on the gems Tiao 苕 and Hua 華: [that on the gem] Tiao was “Wan,” [on the gem] Hua was “Yan,” and he sent away his first wife Mo Xi to Luo 洛. In the Qing Palace 傾宮 he decorated the Yao Tower 瑤臺 for them to live in. Lady Mo Xi had intercourse with Yi Yin, for the purpose of making dissension between Yin and Xia” (translation by David Nivison).

== See also ==
- Daji
- Bao Si

== Sources ==
- Gu Lienü zhuan 古列女傳. Shanghai: Shangwu yinshuguan 1936.
- Guoyu 國語. Shanghai: Guji, 1978.
- Nivison, David S. The Riddle of the Bamboo Annals. Taipei, Taiwan: Airiti Press, 2009.
- Shiji 史記. Beijing: Zhonghua shuju, 1959.
- Wu Yue chunqiu 吳越春秋 Taipei: Sanmin shuju, 2009.
