= 5200 =

5200 may refer to:

- Atari 5200 video game console
- Nokia 5200 mobile phone
- 5200, a number in the 5000 (number) range
- A.D. 5200, the last year of the 52nd century CE
- 5200 BC, a year in the 6th millennium BCE
- 5200 Pamal, an asteroid in the Asteroid Belt, the 5200th asteroid registered

== See also ==
- 520 (disambiguation)
