= 520 BC =

520 BC in various calendars
- Gregorian calendar: 520 BC; DXX BC
- Ab urbe condita: 234
- Ancient Egypt era: XXVII dynasty, 6
- Pharaoh: Darius I of Persia, 2
- Ancient Greek Olympiad (summer): 65th Olympiad (victor)¹
- Assyrian calendar: 4231
- Balinese saka calendar: N/A
- Bengali calendar: −1113 – −1112
- Berber calendar: 431
- Buddhist calendar: 25
- Burmese calendar: −1157
- Byzantine calendar: 4989–4990
- Chinese calendar: 庚辰年 (Metal Dragon); 2178 or 1971 — to — 辛巳年 (Metal Snake); 2179 or 1972
- Coptic calendar: −803 – −802
- Discordian calendar: 647
- Ethiopian calendar: −527 – −526
- Hebrew calendar: 3241–3242
- Hindu calendars
- Vikram Samvat: −463 – −462
- Shaka Samvat: N/A
- Kali Yuga: 2581–2582
- Holocene calendar: 9481
- Iranian calendar: 1141 BP – 1140 BP
- Islamic calendar: 1176 BH – 1175 BH
- Javanese calendar: N/A
- Julian calendar: N/A
- Korean calendar: 1814
- Minguo calendar: 2431 before ROC 民前2431年
- Nanakshahi calendar: −1987
- Thai solar calendar: 23–24
- Tibetan calendar: ལྕགས་ཕོ་འབྲུག་ལོ་ (male Iron-Dragon) −393 or −774 or −1546 — to — ལྕགས་མོ་སྦྲུལ་ལོ་ (female Iron-Snake) −392 or −773 or −1545

The year 520 BC was a year of the pre-Julian Roman calendar. In the Roman Empire, it was known as year 234 Ab urbe condita. The denomination 520 BC for this year has been used since the early medieval period, when the Anno Domini calendar era became the prevalent method in Europe for naming years. This was the year 520 BC.

== Events ==
=== By place ===
==== China ====
- King Dao becomes king of the Zhou Dynasty of China but dies before the end of the year.

== Births ==
- Duanmu Ci, student of Confucius

== Deaths ==
- King Dao of Zhou, king of the Zhou dynasty of China
- King Jing of Zhou, king of the Zhou dynasty of China from 544 to 520 BC
