= Kong Jia =

Kong Jia 孔甲
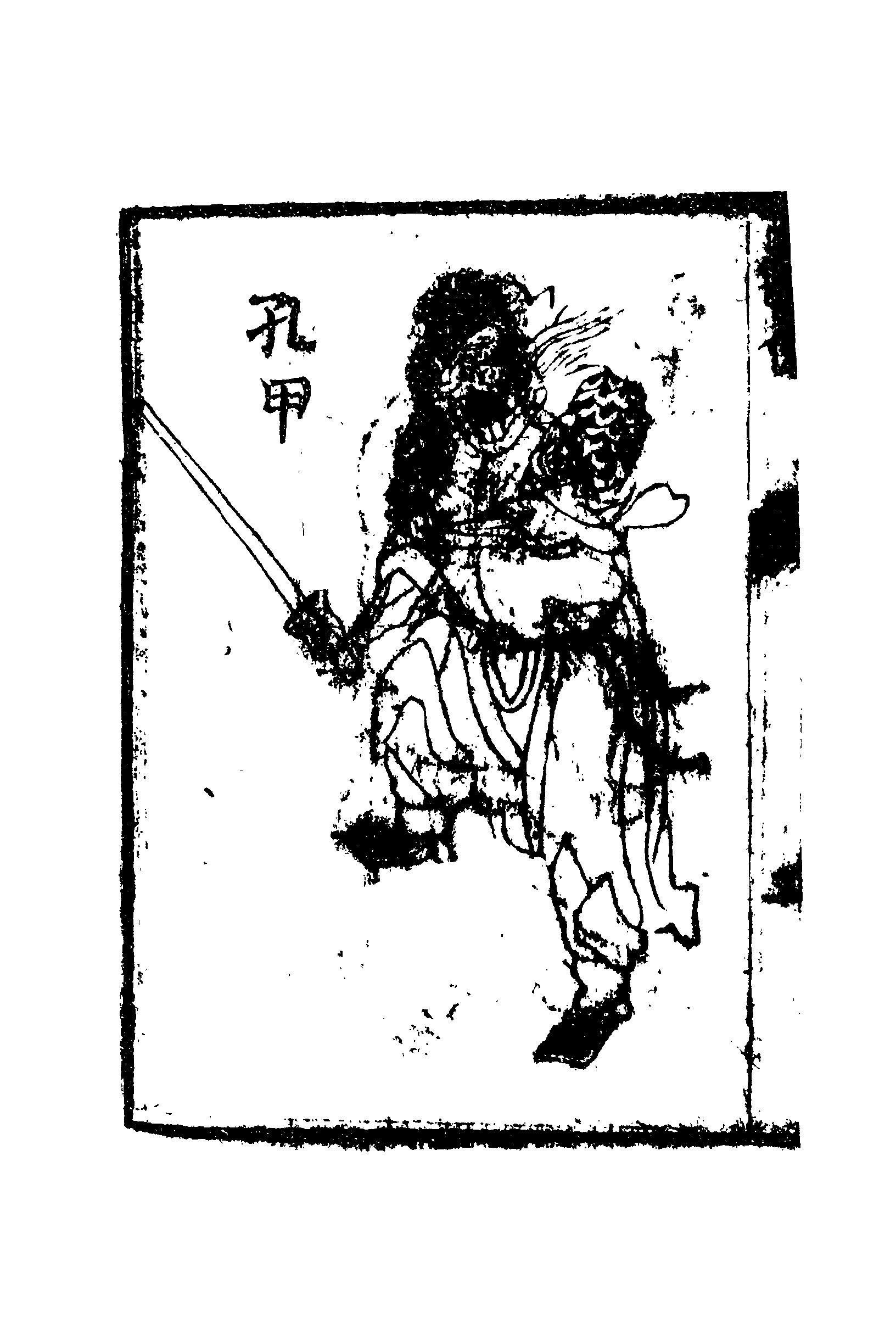
- 1814 illustration.

King of the Xia dynasty
- Reign: 1789–1758 BC
- Predecessor: Jin of Xia
- Successor: Gao
- Issue: Gao
Names
- Family name: Sì (姒); Temple name: Kong Jia (孔甲)
- Father: Bu Jiang

Kǒng Jiǎ (Chinese: 孔甲; pinyin: Kǒng Jiǎ; Wade–Giles: K'ung‑Chia), family name Sì (姒), was the 14th sovereign of the semi-legendary Xia dynasty of ancient China. He possibly ruled for 31 years.

== Family ==
Kong Jia was a son of King Bù Jiàng and an unknown woman and grandson of King Xie of Xia.

His uncle was King Jiong of Xia and his cousin was King Jǐn.

He had many beautiful concubines. He fathered Gāo and was a grandfather of King Houjin.

== Life ==
In the Records of the Grand Historian, King Kong Jia didn't get the throne from his father, the 11th king of the Xia dynasty, because of him being superstitious and absurd. After his father died, his uncle and cousin became the 12th and 13th king of Xia kingdom. When they all died, Kong Jia finally ascended to the throne and became the 14th king of his country. He loved the supernatural, and, following his example, there were soon many supposed shamans and witches. The entire population turned to prayers and oracles instead of working.

According to the Bamboo Annals, Kong Jia lived in the Xia capital of Western River (西河).

In the third year of his reign, he hunted at the Fu Mountains (萯山) in Dongyang (東陽).

He was credited with composing the song "Eastern Sound" (東音), also known as the "Song of Broken Axe" (破斧之歌).

Kong Jia was very superstitious and all he cared about was alcohol. From his time on, the power of Xia started to decline, and the vassal kings (诸侯) of Xia grew more powerful. During his reign, however, he stripped power from one of the nobles named Shiwei (豕韦).

Supposedly, a celestial being gave King Kong Jia two dragons, but they were torpid and ill looking. Kong Jia, in an effort to please them, had a pagoda and lake built for them, but sick they remained. At length there came a man who said he knew what to do. He had 28 men stand in the shapes of the constellations, and wave huge white flags to imitate the clouds. He set gun powder in place of thunder, and firecrackers for lightning. He also had men churn the water of the lake, so the waves leapt high. When he gave his signal, the thunder rumbled, lightning flashed, clouds waved, and water foamed. The dragons, fancying themselves in the heavens again, jumped into the water. However, he accidentally killed one dragon and didn't know how to deal with the dragon's body, so he made it a delicious meal and provided to Kong Jia. After this horrible behavior was found out, this person ran away with his whole family.

A second dragon keeper was very straight-forward and displeased Kong Jia many times, so he was sentenced to death and poorly buried outside of the capital city. After this there were terrible storms and fires, which Kong Jia believed to be caused by the spirit of the dead keeper. He and his witches cast many spells and offered many prayers, but on the way home Kong Jia was so scared he actually died of fear. After King Kong Jia departed, his son King Gao ascended to the throne.

== See also ==
- Buzhu: Legendary noble who is claimed to have served as minister of agriculture under the emperor after his father

== Sources ==
Kong Jia Xia dynasty
Regnal titles
Preceded by Jin	King of China; 1789 BC – 1758 BC	Succeeded by Gao
