= Jie of Xia =

17th and last Xia dynasty king

Jie 桀
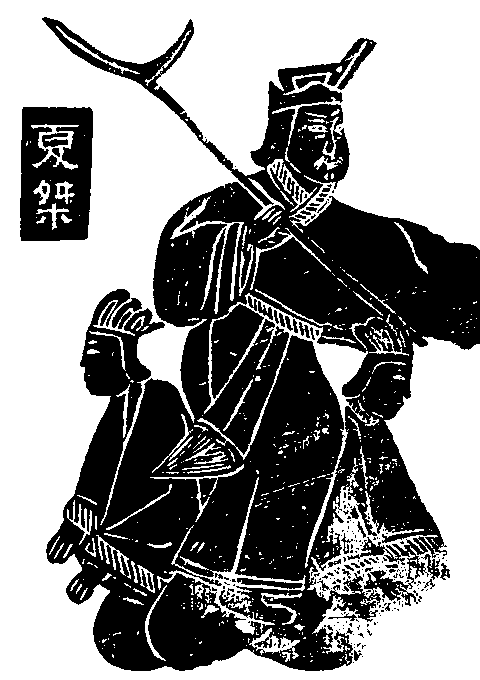
- Jie with a Ji, sitting on two ladies. Relief from a Wu family shrine, Jiaxiang, Shandong.

King of the Xia dynasty
- Reign: 1728–1675 BCE
- Predecessor: Fa of Xia
- Successor: Cheng Tang
- Died: c. 1663 BCE; Tingshan (亭山)
- Spouse: Mo Xi; Zhao; Hua
- Issue: Xunyu (獯粥)
Names
- Personal name: Lu (履); Temple name: Di Gui (帝癸); Posthumous name: Jie (桀)
- Father: Fa of Xia
- Mother: Consort of Fa
- Military career
- Allegiance: Xia dynasty
- Conflicts: Battle of Mingtiao

Jie of Xia
- Jie 桀 in small seal script.
- Chinese: 桀
Transcriptions
Standard Mandarin
- Hanyu Pinyin: Jié
- Gwoyeu Romatzyh: Jye
- Wade–Giles: Chieh^{2}
- IPA: [tɕjě]
Yue: Cantonese
- Yale Romanization: Git
- Jyutping: Git^{3}
Southern Min
- Tâi-lô: Kia̍t
Middle Chinese
- Middle Chinese: gjet
Old Chinese
- Baxter–Sagart (2014): *N-[k]<r>at
- Zhengzhang: /*ɡrad/

King Jie (Chinese: 桀; pinyin: Jié; Wade–Giles: Chieh; traditionally 1728–1675 BCE), also known by his temple name Di Gui (帝癸), was the 17th and last sovereign of the Xia dynasty of China. He is traditionally regarded as a tyrant and oppressor who brought about the collapse of a dynasty.

Around 1600 BCE, Jie was defeated by Tang of Shang, bringing an end to the Xia dynasty that lasted about 500 years, and a rise to the new Shang dynasty.

== Etymology ==
Jié 桀 (variant: 傑) (< Old Chinese: *grad) (ZS) means "outstanding" and later "hero"; with regards to Chinese, it is cognate to qiè 朅 (< OC *kʰrad) (ZS) "martial"; with regards to languages other than Chinese, it is cognate to either Tibetan: གྱད་, Wylie: gyad "strength; champion, athlete", or Mizo: hrât "brave, resolute".

The rime dictionary Guangyun later associates this Xia king's name (or epithet) Jié 桀 with 磔 zhé "to dismember, to cut asunder". Kangxi dictionary states that 磔 (zhé) is synonymous with 疈辜 pìgū "to cut asunder and open up", in Rites of Zhou; and that "the ancients asserted that the fierce and devious (桀黠 jiéxiá) ones are brutal and violent (凶暴 xiōngbào), as if they were cutting [things] asunder (磔 zhé)."

Historian Pei Yin (裴骃) cites Rules for Posthumous Names (謚法/諡法 Shìfǎ) (attributed to the Duke of Zhou), that Jié 桀 was meant for those who harmed and killed numerous people.

In the Bamboo Annals, Jie is known as Di Gui (帝癸), which matches the Shang dynasty system for temple names. (Note: At the time, these were called riming 日名 "day names.") Gu Yanwu is among the first to identify this, noting such in his essay Records of Daily Knowledge (日知录) in 1639.

== Early years ==
Jie is generally known as Xia Jie (夏桀) or Jie of Xia. His given name was Lü Gui (履癸). Jie ascended to the throne in the year of Renchen (壬辰). Initially, his capital was in Zhenxun. He lived there for three years and constructed his tilt palace. About the same time, he destroyed the pyramid of Rong (容台), and quelled a rebellion by the Quanyi people (aka Fei Barbarians) after they entered Qi, near Fen.

His parents were Fa of Xia and his wife.

== Reign ==
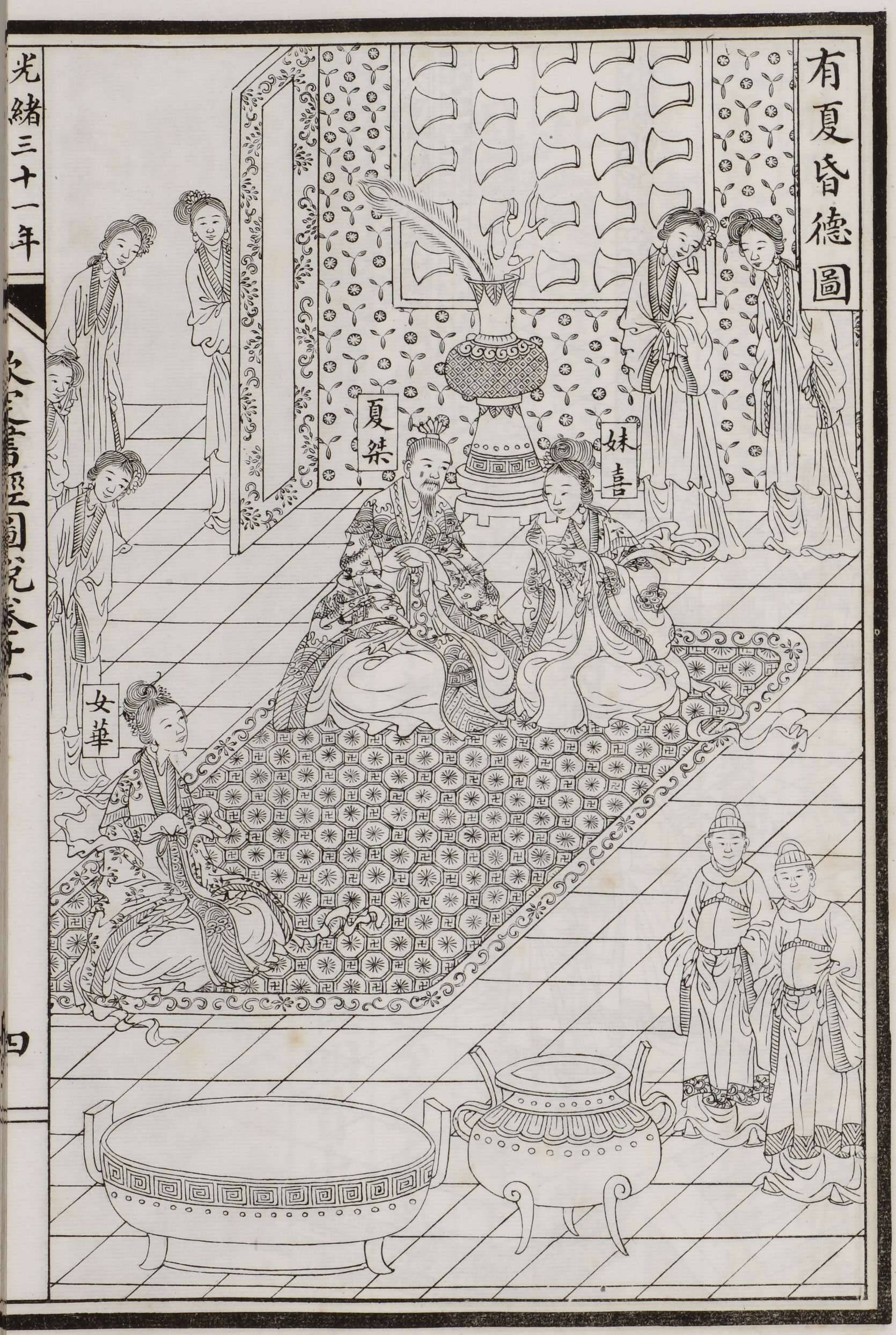
Jie with the concubine Mo Xi

Jie is said to have lived a lavish lifestyle with slaves and treated his people with extreme cruelty. His style of rule was reckless and filled with sex, luxury, and entertainment. He disliked criticism and inspired fear among his subjects. However, Yuri Pines notes that the Rong Cheng Shi, a more recent excavation from 1994, depicts Jie's crimes in a fairly mild light. Comparing with other classics like the Bamboo Annals, he argues that these texts seemingly condemn Tang's overthrow of Jie through its description of a drought that occurred for several years.

In the sixth year of Jie's regime, he entertained envoys from vassals and neighbors. He received an envoy from the Qizhong barbarian people (歧踵戎). In the 11th year, he summoned all his vassals to his court. The Youmin Kingdom (有緡) did not come, so Jie attacked and conquered it.

In the 13th year of his rule, he moved his capital from Zhenxun to 'South of the river' (河南). About that time, he began using the Nian (輦), or sedan chair, on which he was carried by servants.

The next year, he led an army to Minshan. There, he found two of the King of Minshan's daughters, Wan (琬) and Yan (琰). They were unmarried and very beautiful, so he took them as his wives, renaming them Zhao (苕) and Hua (華). He abandoned his original wife Mo Xi (妹喜) and arranged for a pyramid to be built on top of the Tilt Palace for them to live in.

In the Indian epic Mahabharata, Bhima mentions a "China king" Dhautamulaka in Udyoga Parva (Book 5 Chapter 74) , who caused the destruction of his own race. Bhima explains this to Yudhiṣṭhira, elder brother of Pandavas and King of Hastinapura, as a part of a strategic and moral argument as an example of how a King should not behave to his subjects. Bhima uses China King Dhautamulaka as an example of how he destroyed his own family and how Yudhiṣṭhira should not behave like he did. The name "Dhautamulaka" translates to "clean root", and scholarship identified this might be a reference to the last Xia king, Jie.

=== Alcohol lake ===
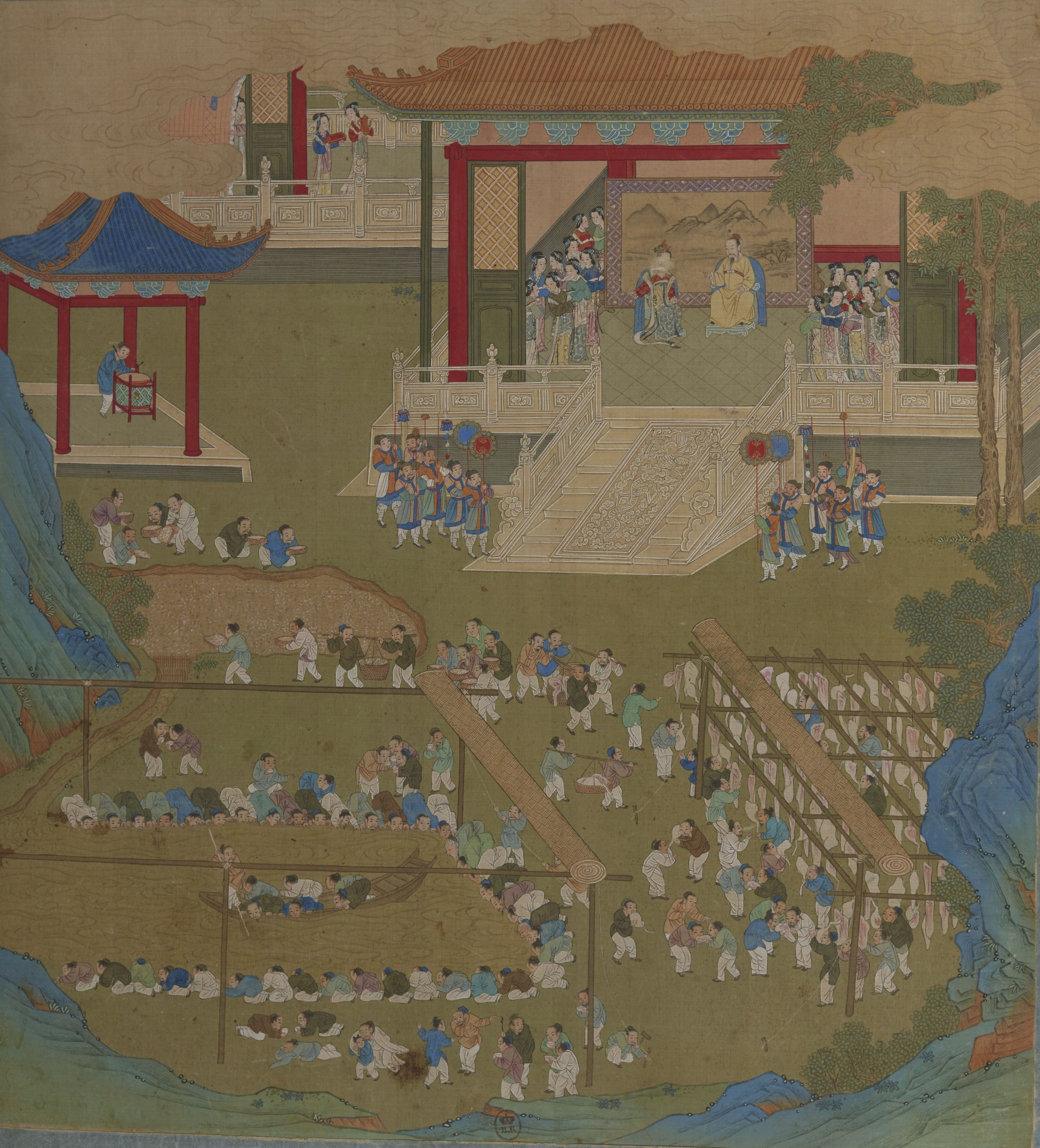
Alcohol lake

According to Liu Xiang's book Lienü zhuan written much later, around 18 BC, Jie was corrupted by his infatuation with his concubine Mo Xi (妺喜 or 末喜), who was beautiful, but completely lacking in virtue. Among other things, she liked to drink, enjoyed music, and also had a penchant for jugglers and sing-song girls. Apparently, she had Jie order a lake of wine made. They both sailed about in the alcohol lake in an orgy of drunken naked men and women bathing and drinking. She then commanded 3,000 men to drink the lake dry, only to laugh when they all drowned. This event was also recorded in Han Ying's book Han shi waizhuan.

The narrative of the wine pool and meat forest notably mirrors similar, more common accusations made towards Di Xin during the Western Zhou period. Song dynasty scholar Luo Mi noticed this in their text Lushi "Grand History," where they argue that the similarities between Jie and Di Xin are due to "copy-paste" forms of historiography, and that this resulted in their collective crimes being greatly exaggerated:

大抵書傳所記桀紂之事多出模倣。如世紀等倒拽九牛、撫梁易柱、引鈎申索、握鐡流湯、傾宮瑤室、與夫璿臺三里、金柱三千、車行酒、騎行炙、酒池糟丘、脯林肉圃、宮中九市、牛飲三千、丘鳴鬼哭、山走石泣、兩日並出、以人食獸、六月獵西山、以百二十日為夜等事。紂為如是，而謂桀亦如是，是豈其俱然哉？

"Generally speaking, the affairs of Jie and Di Xin (Note: Di Xin is referred to here as King Zhou 紂, his pejorative posthumous name) recorded in books and traditions mostly arise from imitation. For example, in works like Records of the Grand Historian, there are stories of dragging nine bulls backward, bracing beams and swapping pillars, stretching bronze hooks, grasping hot iron and flowing hot water, leaning palaces and jasper chambers, along with a jade tower three li around, three thousand golden pillars, carts that travel through wine, riders that travel over roast meat, pools of wine and mounds of lees, forests of dried meat and gardens of flesh, nine markets inside the palace, three thousand drinking like cattle, mounds that wail and ghosts that cry, mountains that run and stones that weep, two suns rising together, humans eating beasts, hunting on West Mountain in the sixth month, and making one hundred and twenty days into a single night. If Di Xin is said to have done these things, and Jie is also said to have done the same, how could it be that both were truly like this?"

=== Jie's cuisine ===
A great deal of effort was spent on Jie's cuisine and his requirements. Vegetables had to come from the northwest, fish had to be from the East Sea, seasonings and sauces had to come from ginger that grew in the south, and sea salt had to come from the north. Several hundred people were employed just to supply Jie with his meals. Anyone that got his meal wrong was beheaded.

Jie was also a known alcoholic, but he did not drink regular wine. He drank a specific type of high-quality, high ABV wine (清醇). Those who could not supply him with this drink were killed. Many people died because of this. While he was drinking wine it was also required that he ride on someone's back like a horse.

In one incident Jie was riding the back of a top chancellor like a horse. After a while the chancellor was tired to the point that he could no longer crawl or move. He asked King Jie to spare him. Jie immediately dragged him out to be executed. Another chancellor, Guan Longfeng (關龍逢), told the king that he was losing the trust of his people along with the Xia dynasty's rivers and mountains (江山). After yelling at Guan, he too was dragged out to be killed.

=== Decline ===
==== The rise of Shang ====
The Xia dynasty held suzerainty over a number of kingdoms, one of which was the Kingdom of Shang. During Jie's reign, Shang grew in power, initially at the expense of Xia's other vassals. A person by the name of Zi Lü (子履) was able to win many supporters from as many as 40 smaller kingdoms. Zi, who became known as Tang of Shang, recognized that Jie mistreated the people and used this as a way to convince other supporters. In one speech Tang of Shang said that creating chaos is not something he wanted, but given the terror of Jie, he has to follow the Mandate of Heaven and use this opportunity to overthrow the Xia. He also pointed out that even Jie's own generals would not obey his orders.

In the 15th year of Jie's reign, Tang of Shang began moving Lü (履) to the capital Bo. About two years later Shang sent his minister Yi Yin as an envoy to Jie. Yi remained in the Xia capital for about three years, before returning to Shang.

The Shang's power continued to grow. In the 26th year of Jie's reign, Shang conquered Wen (溫). Two years later, Shang was attacked by Kunwu (昆吾), and several years of war between Shang and Kunwu followed. Despite this setback, Shang continued to expand on a number of fronts, gathering vassal troops in Jingbo (景亳). The Shang army and allied forces conquered Wei (韋) and Gu (顧). Around the same time Zhong Gu, chief historian of Jie, fled from the Xia to the Shang.

==== Natural disasters ====
As Jie's reign went on, the histories record unusual and increasingly dire natural phenomena. These began in the 10th year of Jie's reign, when five stars were seen in the sky in alignment and a meteor shower occurred, followed by an earthquake.

In the 29th year of Jie's reign he tried to dig a water-tunnel through the Qu mountain, but the next year the mountain collapsed with a landslide. There was also a disaster at Linsui (聆隧) in the winter.

Records from the later Qin dynasty say that during the last year of Jie's reign, ice formed during the summer mornings and frost occurred through July. Heavy rainfall toppled buildings, hot and cold weather arrived in disorder, and crops failed. Some scientists correlate this event with a volcanic winter, possibly due to the Minoan eruption of Thera at around 1600 BC.

=== Battle of Mingtiao ===
In the 32nd year of Jie's reign, Tang of Shang dispatched troops from Er (陑) to simultaneously attack Xia and Kunwu. Kunwu was quickly defeated. By this time, the Xia were getting weaker near the Yellow River while the Shang were becoming stronger.

Jie's forces fought with the Shang forces at Mingtiao in a heavy thunder storm and were defeated.

Jie himself escaped and fled to Sanzong. The Shang forces, under their general Wuzi (戊子), pursued Jie to Cheng (郕), captured him at Jiaomen and deposed him, bringing the Xia dynasty to an end. Eventually, Jie was released in Nanchao (南巢), and Tang of Shang succeeded him as king, and inaugurating the Shang dynasty. Jie eventually died of illness, during a drought in Tingshan (亭山), 12 years later.

== Family ==
King Jie had a wife named Mo Xi (妺喜) who was blamed for the fall of the Xia dynasty, but he later abandoned her for the King of Minshan's daughters Wan and Yan whom Jie renamed Zhao and Hua. King Jie had no known children with his wives. It is alleged that Chunwei, the possible ancestor of the Xiongnu ruling elite, was his son.

== Historicity ==
Due to a lack of direct, testable, archaeological evidence for the Xia dynasty's existence, its historicity, and by extension Jie's, are disputed, especially by western scholars. While the Erlitou culture has been argued to be a site for the Xia dynasty, it was seemingly not literate, with no writing uncovered, and thus no contemporary narratives can be connected to Jie, unlike Di Xin. Records of the Xia dynasty begin to appear during the Zhou dynasty and are not mentioned on Oracle bones dated to the Late Shang.

== See also ==
- Mount Tai earthquake

== Notes ==
Jie of Xia Xia dynasty
Regnal titles
Preceded by Fa	King of China; 1728 BC – 1675 BC	Succeeded by Tang (Shang dynasty)
