= Nokia Talkman 520 =

Mobile phone model

- Manufacturer: Nokia
- First released: October 1984
- Compatible networks: NMT 450
- Form factor: portable phone
- Weight: 4,700 g (166 oz)
- Storage: 184 names
- Battery: stand by (10 h) talk time (60 min)
- Display: Monochrome LCD
- Development status: discontinued

The Nokia Talkman 520 is a discontinued portable phone manufactured by Nokia.
