= King Yuan of Zhou =

Zhou dynasty king of China from 476 to 469 BC

King Yuan of Zhou 周元王

King of the Zhou dynasty
- Reign: 476–469 BC
- Predecessor: King Jìng of Zhou
- Successor: King Zhending of Zhou
- Died: 469 BC
- Issue: King Zhending of Zhou
Names
- Ancestral name: Jī (姬); Given name: Rén (仁)
Posthumous name
- King Yuan (元王)
- House: Ji
- Dynasty: Zhou (Eastern Zhou)
- Father: King Jìng of Zhou

King Yuan of Zhou

Posthumous name
- Chinese: 周元王
- Literal meaning: The Primal King of Zhou
Transcriptions
Standard Mandarin
- Hanyu Pinyin: Zhōu Yuán Wáng
- Wade–Giles: Chou Yuán-wang; King Yuán of Chou

King Yuan of Zhou (Chinese: 周元王; pinyin: Zhōu Yuán Wáng), personal name Ji Ren, was the 27th king of the Chinese Zhou dynasty. He ruled from 476 BC to 469 BC. He was succeeded by his son, King Zhending.

== See also ==
- Family tree of ancient Chinese emperors

== Sources ==
King Yuan of Zhou Zhou dynasty Died: 469 BC
Regnal titles
| Preceded by King Jìng of Zhou | King of China; 476–469 BC | Succeeded by King Zhending of Zhou |
