= USS Alacrity (MSO-520) =

Minesweeper of the United States Navy

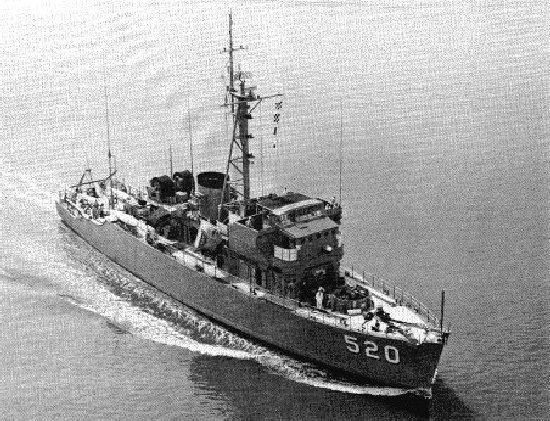
- USS Alacrity (MSO-520) in 1959

History

United States
- Builder: Peterson Builders
- Laid down: 5 March 1956
- Launched: 8 June 1957
- Commissioned: 1 October 1958
- Decommissioned: 30 September 1977
- Stricken: 30 September 1977
- Home port: Charleston, South Carolina
- Fate: Scrapped, 1979

General characteristics
- Displacement: 934 tons
- Length: 190 ft (58 m)
- Beam: 36 ft (11 m)
- Draught: 12 ft (3.7 m)
- Speed: 15 knots
- Complement: 83
- Armament: one 40 mm mount, two .50-caliber machine guns

USS Alacrity (MSO-520/AG-520) was an Ability-class minesweeper acquired by the United States Navy for the task of removing mines that had been placed in the water to prevent the safe passage of ships. In 1973, Alacrity was converted from a minesweeper to anti-submarine warfare ship equipped with the SQR-15 passive towed array, the best long-range passive sonar detection capability in the Navy at that time. Her task was to detect and locate the submarines of cold war adversaries. (Pastore, Michael J. 2025, SONAR—Cold War ASW Adventures).

The third ship to be named Alacrity by the Navy, MSO-520 was laid down on 5 March 1956 at Sturgeon Bay, Wisconsin, by the Peterson Builders; launched on 8 June 1957; sponsored by Mrs. Henry J. Armstrong, the wife of Capt. Armstrong, the chief of staff and aide to the Commandant of the 9th Naval District; ferried to Boston, Massachusetts, via the Great Lakes and the St. Lawrence River; fitted out at the Boston Naval Shipyard; and commissioned there on 1 October 1958, Lt. Theodore W. Pstrak in command.

== USS Alacrity (MSO/AG-520) Commanding Officers ==
From Commissioning 1 October 1958 to Decommissioning September 30, 1977

LT T W Pstrak 1 Oct 1958- 8 July 60

JCDR T Wells 8 July 1960- 15 Jul 1962

LCDR J Allen 15 July 1962-23 July 64

LT P L Gruendl 23 July 1964-16 Sep 66

LCDR H G Vargo 16 Sep 1966- 24 July 68

LT W F Carey 24 Jul 1968-28 Nov 69

LCDR J B Hitchborn 28 Nov 1969 -29 May 71

LT B G Taylor 29 May 1971 – 22 Jul 72

LT R Moser 22 Jul 1972- 12 Jul 74

LT W F Bronaugh, Jr 12 July 1974- 29 Jun 76

LT W C Keller 29 June 1976- 30 Sep 77

(Source- Plaque on door to Commanding Officer’s stateroom, USS Alacrity AG 520)

== East Coast operations ==
The month following commissioning, Alacrity moved south to Charleston, South Carolina, whence she conducted shakedown training before becoming a unit of the Atlantic Fleet Mine Force. The minesweeper began operations in the western Atlantic and in the West Indies. Those duties occupied her time until late in 1960 when she embarked upon her first deployment to the Mediterranean Sea. After her return from duty with the U.S. 6th Fleet late in the spring of 1961, she resumed normal operations along the U.S. East Coast and in the West Indies. That employment lasted until February 1964 at which time Alacrity headed back to the Mediterranean. Her arrival back on the east coast late in the summer of 1964 brought more duty in the western Atlantic. In February 1965, the minesweeper began a four-month tour of duty in the West Indies.

== Dominican Republic emergency operations ==
Near the end of that assignment, in late April 1965, civil war erupted in the Dominican Republic, as supporters of exiled President Juan Bosch instituted a military uprising to seize power from the ruling civilian junta. The resultant strife—the city of Santo Domingo became a battleground—saw the commitment of American marines and paratroopers; Alacrity spent almost the entire month of May helping to evacuate foreign nationals and supporting the troops of an inter-American force sent to restore order.

== Caribbean and Mediterranean operations ==
While operating in the western Atlantic and the West Indies, Alacrity frequently conducted tests for the Naval Ordnance Laboratory Test Facility located at Fort Lauderdale, Florida, and served as a training platform for students at the Mine Warfare School. Those duties, as well as refresher training and independent ship's exercises, occupied her from the beginning of 1966 into the spring of 1969. On 8 May 1969, Alacrity put to sea, once more bound for the Mediterranean. After five months with the U.S. 6th Fleet engaged in training exercises and port visits, the minesweeper headed back to the United States on 11 October. She reached Charleston on 30 October. Then, except for 12 days underway for special operations at the beginning of December, the warship spent the remainder of the year in port at Charleston

== Renewed Mediterranean operations ==
In 1970, Alacrity conducted exercises out of her home port until mid-June. On the 17th of that month, she entered Avondale Shipyards, Inc., for a regular overhaul. The minesweeper completed repairs and left New Orleans, Louisiana, on 1 December. She returned to Charleston on the 6th and, after holiday leave and upkeep, resumed normal operations. After seven months of exercises, drills, and inspections out of Charleston, Alacrity headed back toward the Mediterranean on 2 August. She entered the "Middle Sea" late in August and spent September and the first week in October steaming in the western Mediterranean and making port visits. Alacrity returned to Rota, Spain, on 7 October and two days later sailed for the United States. She returned to Charleston on 27 October and, except for a week at sea for special operations in the middle of December, spent the remainder of the year in her home port.

== Supporting Apollo Project missions ==
On 10 January 1972, Alacrity departed Charleston for an eight-day, cold weather, amphibious exercise off the shores of Maine. By the end of January, the minesweeper was back in Charleston and, in February, resumed normal operations. In April, she interrupted her schedule to provide support for the Apollo 16 moon shot. She resumed operations out of Charleston late in April and remained so occupied almost until the end of the year. Early in December, she returned to the vicinity of Port Canaveral, Florida, to assist in gathering data during the Apollo 17 moon shot. Alacrity concluded that duty at Charleston on 8 December and remained in port for the rest of 1972.

== Converted into a Miscellaneous Auxiliary ==
The warship spent the first four months of 1973 working out of Charleston. On 10 May, she entered Detyen's Shipyard in Mount Pleasant, South Carolina, for modifications. On 1 June 1973, Alacrity was redesignated AG-520. She left Detyen's Shipyard on 23 July and returned to the Naval Station, Charleston, where she remained until 5 August. On that day, the ship headed south to Jacksonville, Florida, where she began further alterations at the Atlantic Drydock Co. on 7 August. The changes were completed by 19 October, and Alacrity returned to Charleston to prepare for refresher training. During November and early December, she conducted refresher training in the West Indies before returning to Charleston on the 10th to begin the annual holiday leave and upkeep period.

== Alacrity’s final Med cruise ==
Alacrity began 1974 engaged in normal operations which kept her busy until midsummer. On 16 July, she stood out of Charleston and embarked upon the final Mediterranean deployment of her active career. The minesweeper operated with the U.S. 6th Fleet conducting training evolutions and port visits until the end of November. She departed Rota, Spain, on 30 November and arrived back in Charleston on 20 December. The ship continued in active service for another 33 months. Throughout that period, she operated in the western Atlantic and in the West Indies on training missions and test-and-evaluation assignments.

== Cold War Operations ==
Background

To appreciate USS Alacrity’s contribution during the Cold War, it is important to know that SONAR (SOund Navigation and Ranging) was the tip of the Navy’s spear for Anti-Submarine Warfare (ASW). As explained by Underwater Sound Lab senior scientist Mike Pastore, in his memoirs (SONAR Cold War ASW Adventures), everything changed in the late 1960s when a new Soviet ballistic missile submarine arrived off the East Coast. There was no longer a 15-minute warning for ICBMs launched from the Soviet heartland. It was imperative that the location of each of these “Yankee” class submarines be known so that they could be neutralized if, and when the time came.

Alacrity’s SONAR had the best long-range passive detection capability in the Navy. She played a key role in the Cold War.

Operation Smoldering Ember

In 1977, the unthinkable happened. The Yankee ballistic missile submarine on patrol in the Atlantic, with missiles aimed at the continental US mainland, went undetected. Alacrity and her sister ship USS Assurance (AG 521) were called to join Operation Smoldering Ember and tasked with the job of finding the lost Yankee.

Mike Pastore was onboard Alacrity at the time, with a new portable tactical tool. In chapter 15 (Smoldering Ember- The Yankee Hunt, p.255) of his book, he explains in detail what he observed. In a separate chapter of the book (Sea Stories, p.355) Alacrity’s commanding officer, Lieutenant William (Coty) Keller, tells his story of Alacrity and Assurance in Smoldering Ember.

Lt. Keller was the on-scene commander for the two-ship task unit. Alacrity gained contact with the previously lost Yankee. Assurance was repositioned to gain contact and obtained a cross fix with the lines of bearing from the two ships. With the aid of Navy patrol aircraft, the Soviet submarine was localized. Problem solved.

At one point towards the end of the operation, Alacrity held contact with the on-station Yankee and detected the incoming (relieving) Yankee. Mike Pastore says this is the only time in history a US Navy ship has held simultaneous contact on two Yankees.

During Operation Smoldering Ember, Alacrity played an important and historic role in winning the Cold War. In recognition of Alacrity and Assurance’s outstanding performance in Operation Smoldering Ember, the Secretary of the Navy awarded them the Meritorious Unit Commendation. It read, in part: “The success of the ASW operations was vital to National Defense and will contribute significantly to the success of future operations. By their exemplary technical skills, sound judgment and total devotion to duty, they reflected great credit upon themselves and upheld the highest traditions of the United States Naval Service.”

== Decommissioning ==
On 30 September 1977, Alacrity was placed out of commission at Charleston, and her name was struck from the Navy list that same day. In December 1979, she was sold to the Ampol Corp. for scrapping.
