= Mount Tai earthquake =

Earliest recorded earthquake in history

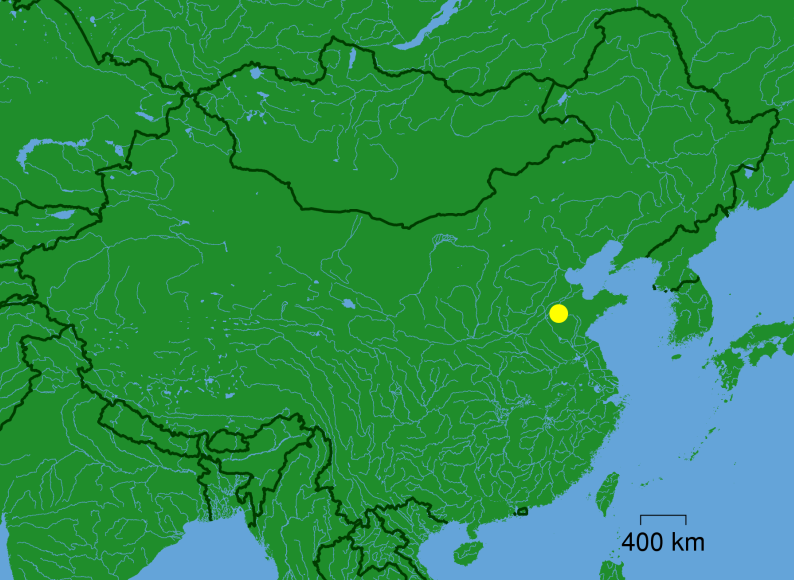
- Local date: c. 1780 BC
- Areas affected: now China

The Mount Tai earthquake (Chinese: 泰山震) was the 2nd recorded earthquake in history. It occurred at Mount Tai, in what is now Shandong, China during the 7th year of the reign of King Fa of the Xia dynasty, which places its occurrence at some point between 2205 BC and 1600 BC. The earthquake was mentioned briefly in the Bamboo Annals. (Note: "current text" (今本 jīnběn), Bamboo Annals, Records of Xia (夏記), "In the seventh year (of King Fa's reign), the king died and (there was) an earthquake in Mount Tai" (七年 陟。泰山震。).) The event has tentatively been dated to between 1831 BC and 1740 BC.
