= King Jing of Zhou (Gai) =

Zhou Dynasty King of China from 519 to 477 BC

King Jing of Zhou 周敬王

King of the Zhou dynasty
- Reign: 519–477 BC
- Predecessor: King Dao of Zhou
- Successor: King Yuan of Zhou
- Died: 477 BC
- Issue: King Yuan of Zhou
Names
- Ancestral name: Jī (姬); Given name: Gài (匄)
Posthumous name
- King Jing (敬王)
- House: Ji
- Dynasty: Zhou (Eastern Zhou)
- Father: King Jǐng of Zhou
- Mother: Queen Mu

King Jing of Zhou (Chinese: 周敬王; pinyin: Zhōu Jìng Wáng), personal name Ji Gai, was the 26th king of China's Zhou dynasty. He ruled from 519 BC to 477 BC. He was succeeded by his son, King Yuan.

After the death of King Jǐng of Zhou, his eldest son Prince Zhao declared himself king. The state of Jin sent troops to attack Prince Zhao and installed Prince Gai as king. This led to frequent conflicts between King Jing and Prince Zhao. In 516 BC, Prince Zhao was forced to flee to the state of Chu. In the spring of 505 BC, Chu was defeated by the state of Wu and was on the brink of destruction. Taking advantage of this, King Jing sent assassins to kill Prince Zhao in Chu. As a result, the supporters of Prince Zhao, led by Dan Pian, rebelled the following year. King Jing fled and returned to the capital with the help of the state of Jin in 503 BC.

The Eastern Zhou established Luoyi (also known as Chengzhou) as its capital during the reign of King Ping of Zhou. After King Ping relocated to the east, Luoyi became known as Wangcheng. During the reign of King Jing, the capital was moved to the east of Luoyi due to the strong influence of Prince Zhao in Luoyi. The new capital was named Chengzhou, while the old capital continued to be referred to as Wangcheng.

== See also ==
1. Family tree of ancient Chinese emperors

King Jing of Zhou (Gai) Zhou dynasty Died: 477 BC
Regnal titles
Preceded by King Dao of Zhou	King of China; 519–477 BC	Succeeded by King Yuan of Zhou
