= Wai Ren =

- King of Shang dynasty
- Predecessor: Zhong Ding
- Successor: Jian Jia
- Issue: He Dan Jia
Full name
- Family name: Zi (子); Given name: Fa (發)
Temple name
- Bu Ren (卜壬) or Wai Ren (外壬)
- Father: Tai Wu

Wai Ren (Chinese: 外壬; pinyin: Wài Rén; Wade–Giles: Wai-Jen) or Bu Ren (Chinese: 卜壬; pinyin: Bǔ Rén; Wade–Giles: Pu-Jen), personal name Zi Fa, was a Shang dynasty King of China.

In the Records of the Grand Historian he was listed by Sima Qian as the eleventh Shang king, succeeding his brother Zhong Ding (仲丁). He was enthroned in the year of Gengxu (Chinese: 庚戌) with Ao (隞) as his capital. During his reign there was a rebellion from Shang's vassals of Pi (邳) and Xian (侁) peoples. He ruled for 15 years (although the Bamboo Annals claim 10 years) before his death. He was given the posthumous name Wai Ren and was succeeded by his son He Dan Jia (河亶甲).

Oracle bone script inscriptions on bones unearthed at Yinxu alternatively record that he was the tenth Shang king, given the posthumous name Bu Ren (卜壬) and succeeded by his youngest brother Jian Jia.

Wai Ren Shang dynasty
Regnal titles
Preceded by Zhong Ding	King of China	Succeeded by Jian Jia
