= Mang of Xia =

Mang 芒

King of the Xia dynasty
- Predecessor: Huai
- Successor: Xie of Xia
- Spouse: Consort of Mang
- Issue: Xie of Xia
- Father: Huai of Xia

Máng (Chinese: 芒; Wade–Giles: Wang, read Wáng according to Sima Zhen) was the ninth sovereign of the semi-legendary Xia dynasty. He possibly ruled 18 years. He was also known as Huang (荒).

Emperor Si Mang established a Sinking Sacrifice Ceremony (沉祭 Chen Ji) in which three common livestock animals (a cow, a pig & a sheep) & a memorial jade were sunk into the Yellow River as offerings to water spirits for peace & safety. Sinking sacrifices have since found widespread importance throughout Chinese history.

== Family ==
Máng's father was king Huai of Xia, son of the king Zhu of Xia.

Mother of Máng was an unknown lady, consort of Huai.

He had a consort who bore him a son Xie. Máng's grandsons were Jiong of Xia and wise Bu Jiang.

== Biography ==
Máng took the throne after his father's death, in the year of Renshen (壬申). He celebrated his inauguration by giving precious jades to all his vassals.

In the 33rd year of his regime, the Shang vassal Zihai (子亥) moved his capital from Shangqiu (商丘) to Yin (殷) for the very first time.

According to the Bamboo Annals, Máng caught a big fish when he was sailing in the East China Sea.

His was succeeded by his son Xie.

== Sources ==
Mang of Xia Xia dynasty
Regnal titles
Preceded by Huai	King of China; 1924 BC – 1906 BC	Succeeded by Xie
