= He Dan Jia =

He Dan Jia 河亶甲
- King of Shang dynasty
- Predecessor: Wai Ren
- Successor: Zu Yi
- Issue: Zu Yi
Full name
- Family name: Zi (子); Given name: Zheng (整)
Temple name
- He Dan Jia (河亶甲) or Jian Jia (戔甲)
- Father: Wai Ren

He Dan Jia (Chinese: 河亶甲; pinyin: Hé Dǎnjiǎ; Wade–Giles: Ho-Tan-Chia) or Jian Jia (Chinese: 戔甲; pinyin: Jiān Jiǎ; Wade–Giles: Chien-Chia), personal name Zi Zheng, was a Shang dynasty King of China.

== Records ==
In the Records of the Grand Historian he was listed by Sima Qian as the twelfth Shang king, succeeding his father Wai Ren. He was enthroned in the year of Gengshen (Chinese: 庚申) with Ao (隞) as his capital. In the first year of his reign, he moved his capital to Xiang (Chinese: 相). In the third year of his reign, his Minister Pengbo (Chinese: 彭伯) conquered Pi (Chinese: 邳) who had rebelled against his father. In the fourth year of his reign he launched another attack against the Blue Barbarians. In the fifth year of his reign the Xian (Chinese: 侁人) occupied Banfang (Chinese: 班方) but were later defeated by the king's ministers Pengbo and Weibo (Chinese: 韦伯) and sent an envoy to the Shang. He ruled for 39 years before his death. He was given the posthumous name He Dan Jia and was succeeded by his son Zu Yi.

Oracle script inscriptions on bones unearthed at Yinxu alternatively record that he was the eleventh Shang king, given the posthumous name Jian Jia (Chinese: 戔甲) and succeeded by his brother Zu Yi.

He Dan Jia Shang dynasty
Regnal titles
Preceded by Bu Ren	King of China	Succeeded by Zu Yi
