= Huai of Xia =

8th ruler of the Xia dynasty

Huai 槐

8th King of the Xia dynasty
- Predecessor: Zhu
- Successor: Mang
- Issue: Mang
- Dynasty: Xia dynasty
- Father: Zhu

Huai (Chinese: 槐; pinyin: Huái; Wade–Giles: Huai) was the eighth sovereign of the semi-legendary Xia dynasty (c. 2070–1600 BCE) of Ancient China. His reign length varies considerably in sources, either around 26 or 44 years.

== Background ==
The Xia dynasty (夏朝; c. 2070–1600 BCE) is the first dynasty of traditional Chinese historiography. Founded by Yu the Great, both the dynasty and its rulers are of highly uncertain and controversial historicity.

Herbert J. Allen notes that the character for Huai's name and the Sophora japonica tree are the same. His name is read Hui according to Sima Zhen; his other name is Fen (芬). His name is also read as Hai.

== Traditional narrative ==
Extant sources offer little information on Huai's reign; they are mainly limited to court appointments and assemblies.

Huai ascended the throne in the year of Wuzi (戊子), after his father Zhu had died.

In the 3rd year of his reign, nine barbarians (九夷) came to his capital.

In the 16th year of his regime, the minister Luobo (洛伯) fought with minister Fengyi (冯夷) at He(河). In the 33rd year of his regime, he assigned the son of Kunwu as minister in Yousu (有苏).

He created a prison called yuantu (圜土) in the 36th year of his reign.

He was succeeded by his son Mang.

== Chronology ==
Huai is traditionally held to have succeeded his father Zhu and been succeeded by his son Mang. Aside from this, all reign periods and lengths are speculative and unverifiable.

Differing reign lengths of Huai (BCE)
Source	Length	Speculative Years
Shiji	26	2040–2015
Bamboo Annals	44	1851–1807

Huai of Xia Xia dynasty
Regnal titles
Preceded by Zhu	King of China	Succeeded by Mang
