= Bu Jiang =

Bu Jiang 不降
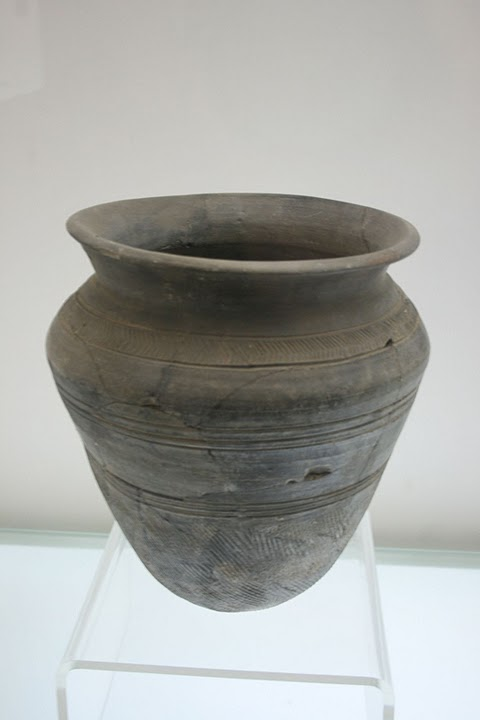
- A vessel from the Erlitou culture

King of the Xia dynasty
- Reign: 1890–1831 BC
- Predecessor: Xie of Xia
- Successor: Jiong of Xia
- Died: c. 1821 BC
- Issue: Kong Jia
- Father: Xie of Xia

Bu Jiang (Chinese: 不降; pinyin: Bù Jiàng; Wade–Giles: Pu-Chiang) was the 11th sovereign of the semi-legendary Xia dynasty. He ruled for 59 years.

== Family ==
Bu Jiang was a son of Xie of Xia and his consort and thus a grandson of Mang of Xia and brother of Jiong of Xia.

His consort is unknown, and it is possible that he had concubines. His son was Kong Jia and his nephew was Jin of Xia.

== Biography ==
According to Bamboo Annals, on the 6th year of his regime, he fought with Jiuyuan(九苑) .

In the 35th year of his reign, his vassal state of Shang defeated Pi (皮氏).

In the 59th year of his regime he passed his throne to his younger brother Jiong. 10 years later, Bu Jiang died.

== Sources ==
Bu Jiang Xia dynasty
Regnal titles
Preceded by Xie	King of China; 1890 BC – 1831 BC	Succeeded by Jiong
