= Zu Yi =

Zu Yi 祖乙
- King of Shang dynasty
- Reign: 1428–1409 BC
- Issue: Zu Xin, Wo Jia
Full name
- Family name: Zǐ (子); Given name: Téng (滕)
Posthumous name
- Zu Yi
- Father: He Dan Jia

Zu Yi (Chinese: 祖乙; pinyin: Zǔ Yǐ; Wade–Giles: Tsu-I), personal name Zǐ Téng, was a Shang dynasty King of China.

In the Records of the Grand Historian he was listed by Sima Qian as the thirteenth Shang king, succeeding his Father He Dan Jia (河亶甲). He was enthroned in the year of Jisi (己巳) with Xiang (相) as his capital. In the first year of his reign he moved his capital to Geng (耿) where he held a ceremony and wrote the article of Zuyi. The following year he moved his capital again, this time to Bi (庇) where six years later his palace was completed. During his reign the Shang became stronger than ever thanks to some fine appointments including Wuxian (巫贤) as his prime minister in the third year of his reign and Gaoyu (高圉) as his vassal in the fifteenth year of his reign. He ruled for about 19 years before his death. He was given the posthumous name Zu Yi and was succeeded by his son Zu Xin (祖辛).

Oracle script inscriptions on bones unearthed at Yinxu alternatively record that he was the 12th Shang king succeeding his brother Jian Jia (戔甲) and given the posthumous name Xia Yi (下乙).

Zu Yi Shang dynasty
Regnal titles
Preceded by Jian Jia	King of China	Succeeded by Zu Xin
