= King Jing of Zhou (Gui) =

Chinese Zhou Dynasty king from 544 BC to 520 BC

King Jing of Zhou 周景王

King of the Zhou dynasty
- Reign: 544–520 BC
- Predecessor: King Ling of Zhou
- Successor: King Dao of Zhou
- Died: 520 BC
- Spouse: Queen Mu
- Issue: Prince Zhao (illegitimate); Crown Prince Shou; King Dao of Zhou; King Jìng of Zhou
Names
- Ancestral name: Jī (姬); Given name: Guì (貴)
Posthumous name
- King Jing (景王)
- House: Ji
- Dynasty: Zhou (Eastern Zhou)
- Father: King Ling of Zhou

King Jing of Zhou

Posthumous name
- Chinese: 周景王
- Literal meaning: The Decisive King of Zhou
Transcriptions
Standard Mandarin
- Hanyu Pinyin: Zhōu Jǐng Wáng
- Wade–Giles: Chou Jǐng-wang; King Jǐng of Chou

King Jing of Zhou (Chinese: 周景王; pinyin: Zhōu Jǐng Wáng), personal name Ji Gui, was the 24th king of the Zhou dynasty of China. He succeeded to the throne after the death of King Ling. King Jing reigned from 544 BC to 520 BC. The country was in financial ruin during King Jing's reign and supplies had to be bought from neighbouring states. He died in 520 BC of a disease and he was briefly succeeded by his son, King Dao.

== Family ==
Queens:

- Queen Mu (穆后; d. 527 BC), the mother of Crown Prince Shou

Concubines:

- The mother of Crown Prince Meng and Prince Gai

Sons:

- First son, Prince Zhao (王子朝; d. 505 BC), born to a concubine, fled toward Chu in 516 BC
- Crown Prince Shou (太子壽; d. 527 BC)
- Crown Prince Meng (太子猛; d. 520 BC), ruled as King Dao of Zhou in 520 BC
- Prince Gai (王子匄; d. 477 BC), ruled as King Jìng of Zhou from 519 to 477 BC

== See also ==
- Family tree of ancient Chinese emperors

King Jing of Zhou (Gui) Zhou dynasty Died: 520 BC
Regnal titles
| Preceded by King Ling of Zhou | King of China; 544–520 BC | Succeeded by King Dao of Zhou |
