= Yong Ji =

Yong Ji 雍己
- King of Shang dynasty
Full name
- Family name: Zi (子); Given name: Dian (佃), Zhou (伷) or Mi(密)
Posthumous name
- Yong Ji (雍己)

Yong Ji (Chinese: 雍己) or Lü Ji(呂己), personal name Zi Dian or Zi Zhou, was a Shang dynasty King of China.

In the Records of the Grand Historian he was listed by Sima Qian as the eighth Shang king, succeeding his brother Xiao Jia (小甲). He was enthroned in the year of Jiaxu (甲戌) with Bo (亳) as his capital. He ruled for 12 years, was given the posthumous name Yong Ji and was succeeded by brother Tai Wu (太戊).

Oracle bone script inscriptions on bones unearthed at Yinxu alternatively record that he was the eighth Shang king succeeding his brother Tai Wu (大戊), given the posthumous name Lü Ji (呂己) and succeeded by his nephew Zhong Ding (中丁). The economy began to decline under his rule.

Yong Ji Shang dynasty
Regnal titles
Preceded by Tai Wu	King of China	Succeeded by Zhong Ding
