= Wo Jia =

Wo Jia 沃甲
- King of Shang dynasty
- Predecessor: Zu Xin
- Successor: Zu Ding
Full name
- Family name: Zi (子); Given name: Yu (逾)
Posthumous name
- Wo Jia (沃甲)
Temple name
- Qiang Jia (羌甲)
- Father: Zu Yi

Wo Jia (Chinese: 沃甲) or Qiang Jia (Chinese: 羌甲), personal name Zi Yu, was a Shang dynasty King of China.

In the Records of the Grand Historian he was listed by Sima Qian as the15th Shang king, succeeding his brother Zu Xin (祖辛). He was enthroned in the year of Renyan (壬寅) with Bi (庇) as his capital. He ruled for about 25 years (although other sources claim 20 years) before his death. He was given the posthumous name Wo Jia and was succeeded by his nephew Zu Ding (祖丁).

Oracle script inscriptions on bones unearthed at Yinxu alternatively record that he was the 14th Shang king, given the posthumous name Qiang Jia (羌甲).

Wo Jia Shang dynasty
Regnal titles
Preceded by Zu Xin	King of China	Succeeded by Zu Ding
