= Tai Wu =

Tai Wu 太戊
- King of Shang dynasty
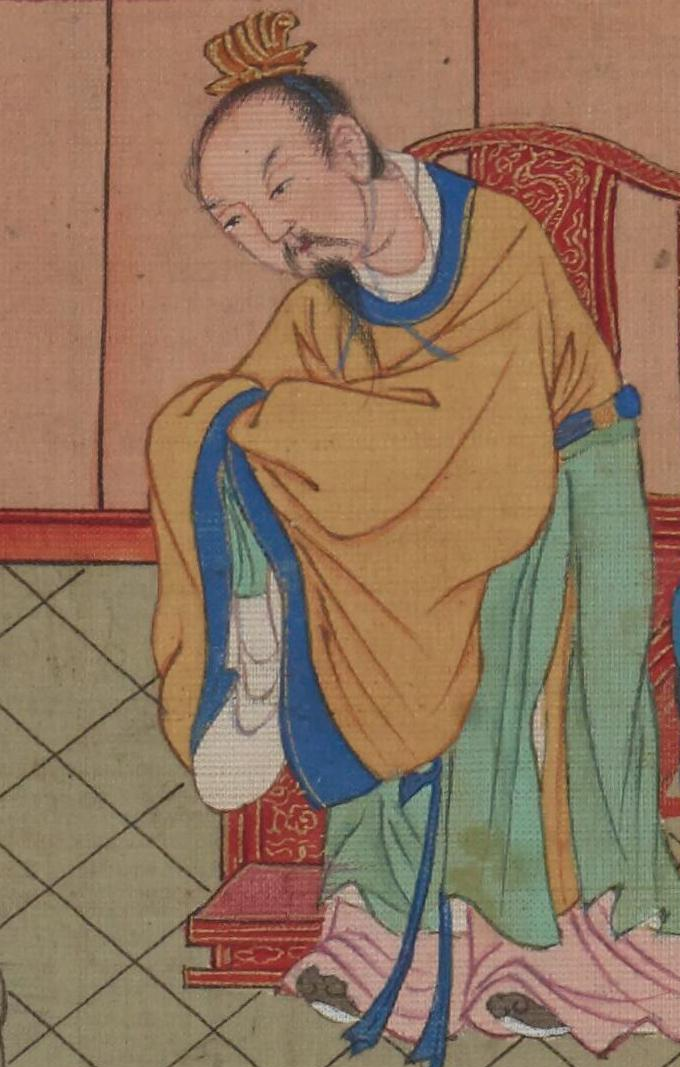
- Predecessor: Xiao Jia
- Successor: Zhong Ding
- Spouse: Bi Ren (妣壬)
- Issue: Zhong Ding, Wai Ren
Full name
- Family name: Zi (子); Given name: Mi (密)
Posthumous name
- Tai Wu
- Father: Tai Geng

Tai Wu (Chinese: 太戊; pinyin: Tài Wù; Wade–Giles: T'ai-Wu) or Da Wu, personal name Zi Mi (子密), was a Shang dynasty King of China. In Records of the Grand Historian he was listed by Sima Qian as the ninth Shang king, succeeding his brother Yong Ji (太庚). He was enthroned with Bo (亳) as his capital. He appointed Yi She (伊陟) and Chen Hu (臣扈) as his higher officers.

On the 7th year of his reign a mulberry tree (桑) and some millet (穀) were found growing together in his palace. According to the Records of the Grand Historian, surprisingly, they grew into tall trees within 7 days. The young king was scared and turned to Yi She and Wu Xian (巫咸) for an explanation, who said it was due to the king's incapable governance. Tai Wu listened to his intelligent ministers and worked diligently to cultivate moral power; then, those two unusual trees withered soon after he became an effective ruler.

In the 11th year of his reign, he ordered Wu Xian to pray at Shanchuan (山川). In the 26th year of his reign, the Queen of West Rong (西戎) sent an envoy to Shang, the king later sent Wangmeng (王孟) on a return visit. In the 31st year of his reign, he appointed Zhongyan (中衍) of Fei vassal (費侯) to the position of Chezheng (車正). In the 35th year of his reign, he wrote a poem called Yanche (寅車,"Tiger chariot" or "To revere the chariot"). In the 46th year of his reign, there was a great harvest of crops. In the 58th year of his reign, he built the city of Pugu (蒲姑). In the 61st year of his reign, the nine Dongyi tribes (東九夷) sent envoys to Shang.

He ruled for 75 years, was given the temple name Tai Wu, and was succeeded by his son Zhong Ding (仲丁).

Oracle script inscriptions on bones unearthed at Yinxu alternatively record that he was the seventh Shang king succeeding his uncle Xiao Jia, given the posthumous name Da Wu (大戊) and succeeded by his brother Lü Ji.

Tai Wu Shang dynasty
Regnal titles
Preceded by Xiao Jia	King of China	Succeeded by Zhong Ding
