= King Dao of Zhou =

King of the Chinese Zhou Dynasty (died 520 BC)

King Dao of Zhou 周悼王

King of the Zhou dynasty
- Reign: 520 BC
- Predecessor: King Jĭng of Zhou
- Successor: King Jìng of Zhou
- Died: 520 BC
Names
- Ancestral name: Jī (姬); Given name: Měng (猛)
Posthumous name
- King Dao (悼王)
- House: Ji
- Dynasty: Zhou (Eastern Zhou)
- Father: King Jĭng of Zhou

King Dao of Zhou

Posthumous name
- Chinese: 周悼王
- Literal meaning: The Mournful King of Zhou
Transcriptions
Standard Mandarin
- Hanyu Pinyin: Zhōu Dào Wáng
- Wade–Giles: Chou Dào-wang; King Dào of Chou

King Dao of Zhou (Chinese: 周悼王; pinyin: Zhōu Dào Wáng; died 520 BC), personal name Ji Meng, was the 25th king of the Chinese Zhou dynasty.

Dao succeeded his father, King Jǐng. After a reign of less than a year, he was killed by his brother Prince Zhao (朝). Following King Dao's death, the throne passed to another of his brothers, King Jìng.

== See also ==
- Family tree of ancient Chinese emperors

King Dao of Zhou Zhou dynasty Died: 520 BC
Regnal titles
Preceded by King Jĭng of Zhou	King of China; 520 BC	Succeeded by King Jìng of Zhou
