= Fa of Xia =

Chinese ruler from 1747 to 1728 BCE

Fa 發
- Fa in small seal script.

King of the Xia dynasty
- Reign: 1747–1728 BC
- Predecessor: Gao
- Successor: Jie
- Issue: Jie
Names
- Given name: Chinese: Hou Jin (后敬); Temple name: Fa (發)
- Father: Gao of Xia

Fa of Xia
- Chinese: 發
Transcriptions
Standard Mandarin
- Hanyu Pinyin: Fā
- Gwoyeu Romatzyh: Jye
- IPA: [fá]
Yue: Cantonese
- Jyutping: Faat^{3}
- IPA: [fa˧]
Southern Min
- Tâi-lô: Kia̍t
Old Chinese
- Baxter–Sagart (2014): *Cə.pat

Fa (Chinese: 發; pinyin: Fā; Wade–Giles: Fa) was the 16th sovereign of the Xia dynasty, father of the infamous Jie who brought the dynasty to its end.

His given name was Houjing (后敬).

== Reign ==
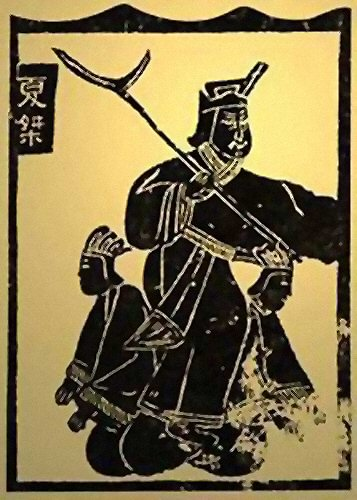
Fa's son Jie with the two ladies

Fa was a son of the King Gao of Xia and thus a grandson of Kong Jia.

During his inaugural celebration, all of his vassals gathered at his palace.

The first earthquake ever recorded took place in the 7th year of his rule at Mount Tai in modern Shandong during his reign. The event has been dated to 1740 BC as the Mount Tai earthquake.

The earthquake was mentioned briefly in the Bamboo Annals.

== See also ==
- Yu the Great

Fa of Xia Xia dynasty
Regnal titles
| Preceded by Gao | King of China; 1747 BC – 1728 BC | Succeeded by Jie |
