= Zu Xin =

Zu Xin 祖辛
- King of Shang dynasty
- Predecessor: Zu Yi
- Successor: Wo Jia
- Spouse: Bi Jia (妣甲); Bi Ren (妣壬)
Full name
- Family name: Zi (子); Given name: Dan (旦)
Temple name
- Zu Xin (祖辛)

Zu Xin (Chinese: 祖辛), personal name Zi Dan, was a Shang dynasty King of China.

In the Records of the Grand Historian he was listed by Sima Qian as the 14th Shang king, succeeding his Father Zu Yi (祖乙). He was enthroned in the year of Wuzi (戊子) with Bi (庇) as his capital. He ruled for about 16 years (although the Bamboo Annals claim 14 years) before his death. He was given the posthumous name Zu Xin and was succeeded by his younger brother Wo Jia (沃甲).

Oracle script inscriptions on bones unearthed at Yinxu alternatively record that he was the 13th Shang king.

Zu Xin Shang dynasty
Regnal titles
Preceded by Zu Yi	King of China	Succeeded by Qiang Jia
