= Zhong Ding =

Zhong Ding 仲丁
- King of Shang dynasty
- Predecessor: Da Wu
- Successor: Bu Wen
- Spouse: Bi Ji (妣己); Bi Gui (妣癸)
Full name
- Family name: Zǐ (子); Given name: Zhuāng (庄)
Temple name
- Zhong Ding (仲丁)

Zhong Ding (Chinese: 仲丁; pinyin: Zhòng Dīng; Wade–Giles: Chung-Ting), personal name Zǐ Zhuāng, was a king of the Shang dynasty.

In the Records of the Grand Historian he was listed by Sima Qian as the tenth Shang king, succeeding his father Tai Wu (太戊). He was enthroned in the year of Xinchou (Chinese: 辛丑) with Bo (亳) as his capital. In the first year of his reign he moved his capital to Ao (隞). In the sixth year of his reign he attacked the Blue Barbarians (蓝夷). He ruled for 11 years (other sources say 9 years) before his death. He was given the posthumous name Zhong Ding and was succeeded by his brother Wai Ren (外壬).

Oracle script inscriptions on bones unearthed at Yinxu alternatively record that he was the ninth Shang king succeeding his uncle Yong Ji (雍己), given the posthumous name Sanzu Ding (三祖丁) and succeeded by his brother Bu Ren.

Zhong Ding Shang dynasty
Regnal titles
Preceded by Tai Wu	King of China	Succeeded by Bu Ren
