= Jiong of Xia =

Jiong 扃
- Jiong in small seal script.

King of the Xia dynasty
- Predecessor: Bu Jiang
- Successor: Jin of Xia
- Issue: Jiong of Xia
- Dynasty: Xia dynasty
- Father: Xie of Xia
- Religion: Chinese mythology

Jiong (Chinese: 扃; pinyin: Jiōng; Wade–Giles: Chiong) was the 12th sovereign of the semi-legendary Xia dynasty.

== Family ==
Jiōng was a son of Xie of Xia and his spouse and thus a grandson of Máng and brother of Bu Jiang.

His own consort is unknown. His son was Jǐn and his nephew was Kong Jia.

== Biography ==
According to the Bamboo Annals, Jiōng ruled about 18 years, while according to the Records of the Grand Historian, he ruled about 21 years.

He acceded to the throne in the Wuxu (戊戌) year.

In the 10th year of Jiōng's reign, Bu Jiang died.

== Sources ==
Jiong of Xia Xia dynasty
Regnal titles
Preceded by Bu Jiang	King of China; 1831 BC – 1810 BC	Succeeded by Jin
