= King Ai of Zhou =

Zhou Dynasty king of China during 441 BC

King Ai of Zhou 周哀王

King of the Zhou dynasty
- Reign: 441 BC
- Predecessor: King Zhending of Zhou
- Successor: King Si of Zhou
- Died: 441 BC
Names
- Ancestral name: Jī (姬); Given name: Qùjí (去疾)
Posthumous name
- King Ai (哀王)
- House: Ji
- Dynasty: Zhou (Eastern Zhou)
- Father: King Zhending of Zhou

King Ai of Zhou

Posthumous name
- Chinese: 周哀王
- Literal meaning: The Lamentable King of Zhou
Transcriptions
Standard Mandarin
- Hanyu Pinyin: Zhōu Āi Wáng
- Wade–Giles: Chou Āi-wang; King Āi of Chou

King Ai of Zhou (Chinese: 周哀王; pinyin: Zhōu Āi Wáng) personal name Ji Quji, was the 29th king of China's Zhou dynasty. He was the eldest son of King Zhending.

He succeeded his father in 441 BC, but was killed by his younger brother, Shuxi (King Si), after only three months on the throne.

== See also ==
1. Family tree of ancient Chinese emperors

== Sources ==
King Ai of Zhou Zhou dynasty Died: 441 BC
Regnal titles
Preceded by King Zhending of Zhou	King of China; 441 BC	Succeeded by King Si of Zhou
