= King Zhending of Zhou =

Zhou dynasty king of China from 468 to 441 BC

King Zhending of Zhou 周貞定王

King of the Zhou dynasty
- Reign: 468–441 BC
- Predecessor: King Yuan of Zhou
- Successor: King Ai of Zhou
- Died: 441 BC
- Issue: King Ai of Zhou; King Si of Zhou; King Kao of Zhou; Duke Huan of Western Zhou (state)
Names
- Ancestral name: Jī (姬); Given name: Jiè (介)
Posthumous name
- King Zhending (貞定王)
- House: Ji
- Dynasty: Zhou (Eastern Zhou)
- Father: King Yuan of Zhou

King Zhending of Zhou

Posthumous name
- Chinese: 周貞定王
- Literal meaning: The Chaste and Calm King of Zhou
Transcriptions
Standard Mandarin
- Hanyu Pinyin: Zhōu Zhēndìng Wáng
- Wade–Giles: Chou Chēndìng-wang; King Chēndìng of Chou

King Zhending of Zhou (Chinese: 周貞定王; pinyin: Zhōu Zhēndìng Wáng), personal name Ji Jie, was the 28th king of the Chinese Zhou dynasty. He ruled between 468 BC and 441 BC.

== Family ==
Sons: King Zhending had four sons:

- First son, Prince Quji (王子去疾; d. 441 BC), ruled as King Ai of Zhou in 441 BC
- Prince Shuxi (王子叔襲; d. 441 BC), ruled as King Si of Zhou in 441 BC
- Prince Wei (王子嵬; d. 426 BC), ruled as King Kao of Zhou from 440 to 426 BC
- Prince Jie (王子揭; d. 415 BC), ruled as Duke Huan of Western Zhou (西周桓公) from 440 to 415 BC

== See also ==
- Family tree of ancient Chinese emperors

== Sources ==
King Zhending of Zhou Zhou dynasty Died: 441 BC
Regnal titles
Preceded by King Yuan of Zhou	King of China; 468–441 BC	Succeeded by King Ai of Zhou
