= Xie of Xia =

Tenth king of the Xia dynasty

Xie 泄
- Xie in small seal script.

King of the Xia dynasty
- Predecessor: Mang
- Successor: Bu Jiang
- Issue: Bu Jiang
- Dynasty: Xia dynasty
- Father: Mang
- Religion: Chinese mythology

Chinese name
Transcriptions
Standard Mandarin
- Hanyu Pinyin: Xiè
- Wade–Giles: Hsieh
Hakka
- Romanization: siet
Yue: Cantonese
- Jyutping: sit3
Middle Chinese
- Middle Chinese: sjet
Old Chinese
- Baxter–Sagart (2014): /*s-lat/
- Zhengzhang: /*sled/

Xie (Chinese: 泄; pinyin: Xiè; Wade–Giles: Hsieh) was the tenth sovereign of the semi-legendary Xia dynasty. The son of Mang, Xie ascended the throne in the "Xinwei" (辛未) year. He possibly ruled 25 years.

== Reign ==
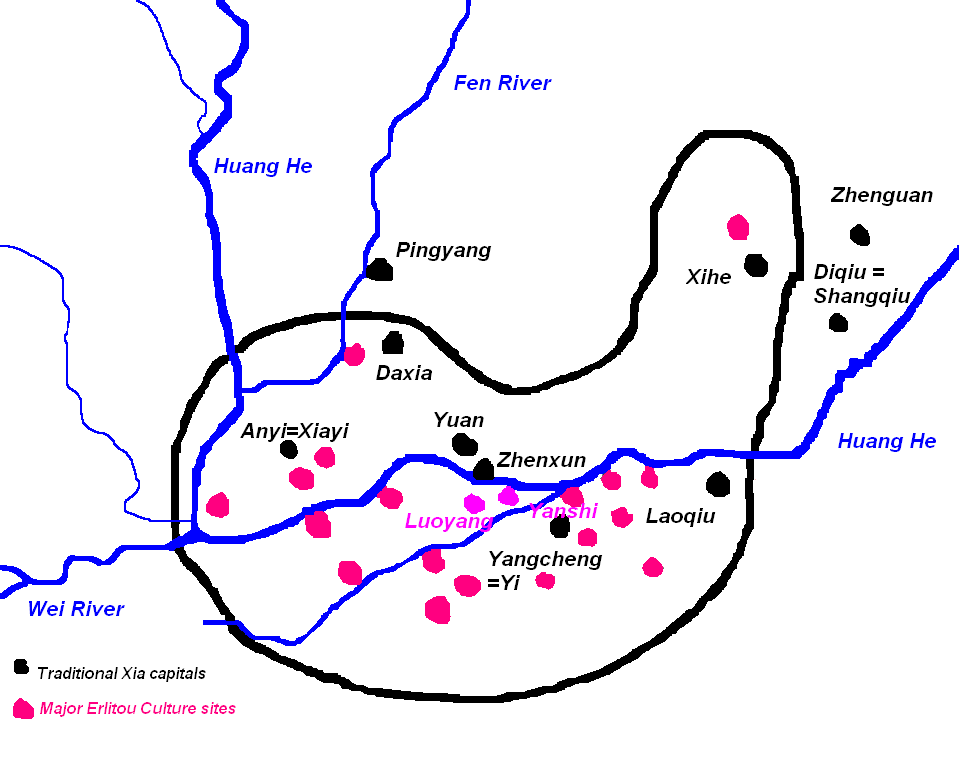
The Erlitou culture that Xie controlled.

According to the Bamboo Annals, in the 12th year of Xie's reign, Wang Hai of Shang, while a guest in Youyi (有易), was "guilty of licentious conduct" and killed by the leader of the place, Mianchen (綿臣), who also sent away his retinue. Four years later, Wang Hai's successor, Shang Jia, allied with the forces of the protection of Hebo, and invaded Youyi, killing Mianchen.

In the 21st year of his reign, Xie "conferred regular dignities" on the chiefs of the surrounding barbarians, including the Quanyi (畎夷), Baiyi (白夷), Chiyi (赤夷), Xuanyi (玄夷), Fengyi (風夷), Huangyi (黃夷), and Yangyi (陽夷), which led to them forming relations with Xia. According to the Book of the Later Han, these are all Dongyi tribes.

Xie was succeeded by his sons Bu Jiang and Jiong.

== See also ==
- Family tree of ancient Chinese emperors

Xie of Xia Xia dynasty
Regnal titles
| Preceded by Mang | King of China; 1906 BC – 1890 BC | Succeeded by Bu Jiang |
