= Gao of Xia =

Gao 皋
- Gao in small seal script.

King of the Xia dynasty
- Reign: 1758–1747 BC
- Predecessor: Kong Jia
- Successor: Fa
- Issue: Fa
- Father: Kong Jia

Gāo (Chinese: 皋; pinyin: Gāo; Wade–Giles: Kao) was the 15th sovereign of the semi-legendary Xia dynasty of ancient China. He possibly ruled for 11 years.

In the 3rd year of his regime, Gao restored the power of Shiwei (豕韋), the nobleman deposed by Kong Jia, the father of Gao.

Gao of Xia Xia dynasty
Regnal titles
Preceded by Kong Jia	King of China; 1758 BC – 1747 BC	Succeeded by Fa
