= Jin of Xia =

Jin 廑

King of the Xia dynasty
- Reign: c. 1810 BC – c. 1789 BC
- Predecessor: Jiong
- Successor: Kong Jia
- Father: Jiong

Jǐn (Chinese: 廑; pinyin: Jǐn; Wade–Giles: Chin) was the 13th sovereign of the semi-legendary Xia dynasty of China. His other name is Yinjia (胤甲).

== Reign ==
Jin probably ruled for about 21 years. His father was King Jiong of Xia and his name means "shack".

According to the Bamboo Annals, Jin moved the capital to 'Western He' (西河). In the fourth year of Jin's reign, he missed his former hometown and made the music of West Sound.

In the eighth year of his reign, it is recorded in the Bamboo Annals that ten suns rose in the sky causing a very serious drought.

One of his vassals, Ji Fan (己樊), was the leader of Kunwu (昆吾) clan. Originally he was assigned to the land of Wei, but he moved his capital from Wei to Xu.

== Sources ==
Jin of Xia Xia dynasty
Regnal titles
Preceded by Jiong	King of China c. 1810 BC – c. 1789 BC	Succeeded by Kong Jia
