= King Si of Zhou =

Zhou Dynasty king of China during 441 BC

King Si of Zhou 周思王

King of the Zhou dynasty
- Reign: 441 BC
- Predecessor: King Ai of Zhou
- Successor: King Kao of Zhou
- Died: 441 BC
Names
- Ancestral name: Jī (姬); Given name: Shūxí (叔襲)
Posthumous name
- King Si (思王)
- House: Ji
- Dynasty: Zhou (Eastern Zhou)
- Father: King Zhending of Zhou

King Si of Zhou (Chinese: 周思王; pinyin: Zhōu Sī Wáng), personal name Ji Shuxi, was the 30th king of the Chinese Zhou dynasty.

He gained the throne in 441 BC by killing his older brother King Ai, but he was in turn killed by his younger brother King Kao after only five months of rule.

== See also ==
1. Family tree of ancient Chinese emperors

King Si of Zhou Zhou dynasty Died: 441 BC
Regnal titles
| Preceded by King Ai of Zhou | King of China; 441 BC | Succeeded by King Kao of Zhou |
