= Wangcheng (Zhou dynasty) =

Ancient Chinese city

- Chinese: 王城
- Literal meaning: King’s [Walled] Town; Royal Capital
Transcriptions
Standard Mandarin
- Hanyu Pinyin: Wángchéng
- Wade–Giles: Wang-ch‘êng

Wangcheng Park
- Traditional Chinese: 王城公園
- Simplified Chinese: 王城公园
Transcriptions
Standard Mandarin
- Hanyu Pinyin: Wángchéng Gōngyuán
- Wade–Giles: Wang-ch‘êng Kung-yuën

Wangcheng was an ancient Chinese city located beside the ceremonial eastern capital of Luoyi during the Zhou dynasty. It was constructed in 1021 BC on the model of the earlier and larger Chengzhou 15 kilometers (9.3 mi) to its east. It was the primary capital of the Eastern Zhou dynasty between 771 and 510 BC.

The Eastern Han dynasty also chose the location in AD 25 as the site of its capital Luoyang, which was built over the earlier Zhou city. The ruins of Wangcheng have been partially excavated and are visible in modern Luoyang's Wangcheng Park.
