= King Kao of Zhou =

Zhou Dynasty king of China from 440 to 426 BC

King Kao of Zhou 周考王

King of the Zhou dynasty
- Reign: 440–426 BC
- Predecessor: King Si of Zhou
- Successor: King Weilie of Zhou
- Died: 426 BC
- Issue: King Weilie of Zhou
Names
- Ancestral name: Jī (姬); Given name: Wéi (嵬)
Posthumous name
- King Kao (考王) or King Kaozhe (考哲王)
- House: Ji
- Dynasty: Zhou (Eastern Zhou)
- Father: King Zhending of Zhou

King Kao of Zhou (Chinese: 周考王; pinyin: Zhōu Kǎo Wáng), alternatively King Kaozhe of Zhou (周考哲王), personal name Ji Wei, was the 31st king of the Zhou dynasty of China. He reigned from 440 BC to 426 BC.

King Kao's father was King Zhending. King Kao was succeeded by his son, King Weilie.

== Family ==
Sons:

- Prince Wu (王子午; d. 402 BC), ruled as King Weilie of Zhou from 425–402 BC

== See also ==
Family tree of ancient Chinese emperors

King Kao of Zhou Zhou dynasty Died: 426 BC
Regnal titles
| Preceded by King Si of Zhou | King of China; 440–426 BC | Succeeded by King Weilie of Zhou |
