= Syam =

Syam may refer to:

- Syam, Jura, a commune in eastern France
- Syam Ben Youssef (born 1989), Tunisian footballer
- Amal Syam (born 1962), member of the Palestinian group Hamas
- Amal Syam (born 1969), Palestinian women’s rights advocate
- Amin Syam (1945–2023), Indonesian military officer and politician
- Satrio Syam (born 1986), Indonesian footballer
- Variant of the Indian given name Shyam (see article for a list of people)

== See also ==
- Siyam, or sawm, the practice of fasting in Islam
- Sjam (disambiguation)
- Siam (disambiguation)
- Château de Syam, a castle in Syam, Jura, France
- Forges de Syam, forge works in Jura département
- Seyam, a list of people with that name
