= Jobez =

Jobez is a surname. Notable people with the surname include:

- Alphonse Jobez (1813–1893), French businessman and politician
- Henri-Jean Jobez (1865–1931), French politician
- Jean-Emmanuel Jobez (1775–1828), French businessman and politician
- Jean Jobez (born 1943), French cross-country skier

== See also ==
- Jabez
