= Constructions of magic squares =

Methods of constructing magic squares

Over the millennia, many ways to construct magic squares have been discovered. These methods can be classified as general methods and special methods, in the sense that general methods allow us to construct more than a single magic square of a given order, whereas special methods allow us to construct just one magic square of a given order. Special methods are specific algorithms whereas general methods may require some trial-and-error.

Special methods are the most simple ways to construct magic squares. They follow certain algorithms which generate regular patterns of numbers in a square. The correctness of these special methods can be proved using one of the general methods given in later sections. After a magic square has been constructed using a special method, the transformations described in the previous section can be applied to yield further magic squares. Special methods are usually referred to using the name of the author(s) (if known) who described the method, for e.g. De la Loubere's method, Starchey's method, Bachet's method, etc.

Magic squares exist for all orders except for order 2, as they can trivially be seen as a homogeneous system of linear equations consisting of (at most) $2n+2$ equations and $n^2 + 1$ variables. Magic squares can be classified according to their order as odd, doubly even (n divisible by four), and singly even (n even, but not divisible by four). This classification is based on the fact that entirely different techniques need to be employed to construct these different species of squares. Odd and doubly even magic squares are easy to generate; the construction of singly even magic squares is more difficult but several methods exist, including John Horton Conway's LUX method for magic squares and the Strachey method for magic squares.

== Special methods of construction ==
=== A method for constructing a magic square of order 3 ===
In the 19th century, Édouard Lucas devised the general formula for order 3 magic squares. Consider the following table made up of positive integers a, b and c:

c − b	c + (a + b)	c − a
c − (a − b)	c	c + (a − b)
c + a	c − (a + b)	c + b

These nine numbers will be distinct positive integers forming a magic square with the magic constant 3c so long as 0 < a < b < c − a and b ≠ 2a. Moreover, every 3×3 magic square of distinct positive integers is of this form.

In 1997 Lee Sallows discovered that leaving aside rotations and reflections, then every distinct parallelogram drawn on the Argand diagram defines a unique 3×3 magic square, and vice versa, a result that had never previously been noted.

=== A method for constructing a magic square of odd order ===
Yang Hui's construction method

A method for constructing magic squares of odd order was published by the French diplomat de la Loubère in his book, A new historical relation of the kingdom of Siam (Du Royaume de Siam, 1693), in the chapter entitled The problem of the magical square according to the Indians. The method operates as follows:

The method prescribes starting in the central column of the first row with the number 1. After that, the fundamental movement for filling the squares is diagonally up and right, one step at a time. If a square is filled with a multiple of the order n, one moves vertically down one square instead, then continues as before. When an "up and to the right" move would leave the square, it is wrapped around to the last row or first column, respectively.

step 1
1

step 2
1	
	2

step 3
	1	
3		
		2

step 4
	1	
3		
4		2

step 5
	1	
3	5	
4		2

step 6
	1	6
3	5	
4		2

step 7
	1	6
3	5	7
4		2

step 8
8	1	6
3	5	7
4		2

step 9
8	1	6
3	5	7
4	9	2

Starting from other squares rather than the central column of the first row is possible, but then only the row and column sums will be identical and result in a magic sum, whereas the diagonal sums will differ. The result will thus be a semimagic square and not a true magic square. Moving in directions other than north east can also result in magic squares.

Order 3
8	1	6
3	5	7
4	9	2

Order 5
17	24	1	8	15
23	5	7	14	16
4	6	13	20	22
10	12	19	21	3
11	18	25	2	9

Order 9
47	58	69	80	1	12	23	34	45
57	68	79	9	11	22	33	44	46
67	78	8	10	21	32	43	54	56
77	7	18	20	31	42	53	55	66
6	17	19	30	41	52	63	65	76
16	27	29	40	51	62	64	75	5
26	28	39	50	61	72	74	4	15
36	38	49	60	71	73	3	14	25
37	48	59	70	81	2	13	24	35

=== A method of constructing a magic square of doubly even order ===
Doubly even means that n is an even multiple of an even integer; or 4p (e.g. 4, 8, 12), where p is an integer.

==== Generic pattern ====
All the numbers are written in order from left to right across each row in turn, starting from the top left hand corner. Numbers are then either retained in the same place or interchanged with their diametrically opposite numbers in a certain regular pattern. In the magic square of order four, the numbers in the four central squares and one square at each corner are retained in the same place and the others are interchanged with their diametrically opposite numbers.

==== A construction of a magic square of order 4 ====
Starting from top left, go left to right through each row of the square, counting each cell from 1 to 16 and filling the cells along the diagonals with its corresponding number. Once the bottom right cell is reached, continue by going right to left, starting from the bottom right of the table through each row, and fill in the non-diagonal cells counting up from 1 to 16 with its corresponding number. As shown below:

M = Order 4
1			4
	6	7	
	10	11	
13			16

M = Order 4
1	15	14	4
12	6	7	9
8	10	11	5
13	3	2	16

==== An extension of the above example for Orders 8 and 12 ====
First generate a pattern table, where a '1' indicates selecting from the square where the numbers are written in order 1 to n^{2} (left-to-right, top-to-bottom), and a '0' indicates selecting from the square where the numbers are written in reverse order n^{2} to 1. For M = 4, the pattern table is as shown below (third matrix from left). With the unaltered cells (cells with '1') shaded, a criss-cross pattern is obtained.

M = Order 4
1	2	3	4
5	6	7	8
9	10	11	12
13	14	15	16

M = Order 4
16	15	14	13
12	11	10	9
8	7	6	5
4	3	2	1

M = Order 4
1	0	0	1
0	1	1	0
0	1	1	0
1	0	0	1

M = Order 4
1	15	14	4
12	6	7	9
8	10	11	5
13	3	2	16

The patterns are a) there are equal number of '1's and '0's in each row and column; b) each row and each column are "palindromic"; c) the left- and right-halves are mirror images; and d) the top- and bottom-halves are mirror images (c and d imply b). The pattern table can be denoted using hexadecimals as (9, 6, 6, 9) for simplicity (1-nibble per row, 4 rows). The simplest method of generating the required pattern for higher ordered doubly even squares is to copy the generic pattern for the fourth-order square in each four-by-four sub-squares.

For M = 8, possible choices for the pattern are (99, 66, 66, 99, 99, 66, 66, 99); (3C, 3C, C3, C3, C3, C3, 3C, 3C); (A5, 5A, A5, 5A, 5A, A5, 5A, A5) (2-nibbles per row, 8 rows).

M = Order 8
1	0	0	1	1	0	0	1
0	1	1	0	0	1	1	0
0	1	1	0	0	1	1	0
1	0	0	1	1	0	0	1
1	0	0	1	1	0	0	1
0	1	1	0	0	1	1	0
0	1	1	0	0	1	1	0
1	0	0	1	1	0	0	1

M = Order 8
1			4	5			8
	10	11			14	15	
	18	19			22	23	
25			28	29			32
33			36	37			40
	42	43			46	47	
	50	51			54	55	
57			60	61			64

M = Order 8
1	63	62	4	5	59	58	8
56	10	11	53	52	14	15	49
48	18	19	45	44	22	23	41
25	39	38	28	29	35	34	32
33	31	30	36	37	27	26	40
24	42	43	21	20	46	47	17
16	50	51	13	12	54	55	9
57	7	6	60	61	3	2	64

For M = 12, the pattern table (E07, E07, E07, 1F8, 1F8, 1F8, 1F8, 1F8, 1F8, E07, E07, E07) yields a magic square (3-nibbles per row, 12 rows.) It is possible to count the number of choices one has based on the pattern table, taking rotational symmetries into account.

== Method of superposition ==
The earliest discovery of the superposition method was made by the Indian mathematician Narayana in the 14th century. The same method was later re-discovered and studied in early 18th century Europe by de la Loubere, Poignard, de La Hire, and Sauveur; and the method is usually referred to as de la Hire's method. Although Euler's work on magic square was unoriginal, he famously conjectured the impossibility of constructing the evenly odd ordered mutually orthogonal Graeco-Latin squares. This conjecture was disproved in the mid 20th century. For clarity of exposition, two important variations of this method can be distinguished.

=== Euler's method ===
This method consists in constructing two preliminary squares, which when added together gives the magic square. As a running example, a 3×3 magic square is considered. Each number of the 3×3 natural square by a pair of numbers can be labeled as

1	2	3
4	5	6
7	8	9

αa	αb	αc
βa	βb	βc
γa	γb	γc

where every pair of Greek and Latin alphabets, e.g. αa, are meant to be added together, i.e. αa = α + a. Here, (α, β, γ) = (0, 3, 6) and (a, b, c) = (1, 2, 3). The numbers 0, 3, and 6 are referred to as the root numbers while the numbers 1, 2, and 3 are referred to as the primary numbers. An important general constraint here is

- a Greek letter is paired with a Latin letter only once.

Thus, the original square can now be split into two simpler squares:

α	α	α
β	β	β
γ	γ	γ

a	b	c
a	b	c
a	b	c

The lettered squares are referred to as Greek square or Latin square if they are filled with Greek or Latin letters, respectively. A magic square can be constructed by ensuring that the Greek and Latin squares are magic squares too. The converse of this statement is also often, but not always (e.g. bordered magic squares), true: A magic square can be decomposed into a Greek and a Latin square, which are themselves magic squares. Thus the method is useful for both synthesis as well as analysis of a magic square. Lastly, by examining the pattern in which the numbers are laid out in the finished square, it is often possible to come up with a faster algorithm to construct higher order squares that replicate the given pattern, without the necessity of creating the preliminary Greek and Latin squares.

During the construction of the 3×3 magic square, the Greek and Latin squares with just three unique terms are much easier to deal with than the original square with nine different terms. The row sum and the column sum of the Greek square will be the same, α + β + γ, if

- each letter appears exactly once in a given column or a row.

This can be achieved by cyclic permutation of α, β, and γ. Satisfaction of these two conditions ensures that the resulting square is a semi-magic square; and such Greek and Latin squares are said to be mutually orthogonal to each other. For a given order n, there are at most n − 1 squares in a set of mutually orthogonal squares, not counting the variations due to permutation of the symbols. This upper bound is exact when n is a prime number.

In order to construct a magic square, we should also ensure that the diagonals sum to magic constant. For this, we have a third condition:

- either all the letters should appear exactly once in both the diagonals; or in case of odd ordered squares, one of the diagonals should consist entirely of the middle term, while the other diagonal should have all the letters exactly once.

The mutually orthogonal Greek and Latin squares that satisfy the first part of the third condition (that all letters appear in both the diagonals) are said to be mutually orthogonal doubly diagonal Graeco-Latin squares.

Odd squares: For the 3×3 odd square, since α, β, and γ are in arithmetic progression, their sum is equal to the product of the square's order and the middle term, i.e. α + β + γ = 3 β. Thus, the diagonal sums will be equal if we have βs in the main diagonal and α, β, γ in the skew diagonal. Similarly, for the Latin square. The resulting Greek and Latin squares and their combination will be as below. The Latin square is just a 90 degree anti-clockwise rotation of the Greek square (or equivalently, flipping about the vertical axis) with the corresponding letters interchanged. Substituting the values of the Greek and Latin letters will give the 3×3 magic square.

β	α	γ
γ	β	α
α	γ	β

c	a	b
a	b	c
b	c	a

βc	αa	γb
γa	βb	αc
αb	γc	βa

6	1	8
7	5	3
2	9	4

For the odd squares, this method explains why the Siamese method (method of De la Loubere) and its variants work. This basic method can be used to construct odd ordered magic squares of higher orders. To summarise:

- For odd ordered squares, to construct Greek square, place the middle term along the main diagonal, and place the rest of the terms along the skew diagonal. The remaining empty cells are filled by diagonal moves. The Latin square can be constructed by rotating or flipping the Greek square, and replacing the corresponding alphabets. The magic square is obtained by adding the Greek and Latin squares.

A peculiarity of the construction method given above for the odd magic squares is that the middle number (n^{2} + 1)/2 will always appear at the center cell of the magic square. Since there are (n − 1)! ways to arrange the skew diagonal terms, we can obtain (n − 1)! Greek squares this way; same with the Latin squares. Also, since each Greek square can be paired with (n − 1)! Latin squares, and since for each of Greek square the middle term may be arbitrarily placed in the main diagonal or the skew diagonal (and correspondingly along the skew diagonal or the main diagonal for the Latin squares), we can construct a total of 2 × (n − 1)! × (n − 1)! magic squares using this method. For n = 3, 5, and 7, this will give 8, 1152, and 1,036,800 different magic squares, respectively. Dividing by 8 to neglect equivalent squares due to rotation and reflections, we obtain 1, 144, and 129,600 essentially different magic squares, respectively.

As another example, the construction of 5×5 magic square is given. Numbers are directly written in place of alphabets. The numbered squares are referred to as primary square or root square if they are filled with primary numbers or root numbers, respectively. The numbers are placed about the skew diagonal in the root square such that the middle column of the resulting root square has 0, 5, 10, 15, 20 (from bottom to top). The primary square is obtained by rotating the root square counter-clockwise by 90 degrees, and replacing the numbers. The resulting square is an associative magic square, in which every pair of numbers symmetrically opposite to the center sum up to the same value, 26. For e.g., 16+10, 3+23, 6+20, etc. In the finished square, 1 is placed at center cell of bottom row, and successive numbers are placed via elongated knight's move (two cells right, two cells down), or equivalently, bishop's move (two cells diagonally down right). When a collision occurs, the break move is to move one cell up. All the odd numbers occur inside the central diamond formed by 1, 5, 25 and 21, while the even numbers are placed at the corners. The occurrence of the even numbers can be deduced by copying the square to the adjacent sides. The even numbers from four adjacent squares will form a cross.

10				5
	10		20	
		10		
	0		10	
15				10

10			0	5
	10		20	0
0		10		
	0		10	
15		0		10

10	15	20	0	5
5	10	15	20	0
0	5	10	15	20
20	0	5	10	15
15	20	0	5	10

2	1	5	4	3
1	5	4	3	2
5	4	3	2	1
4	3	2	1	5
3	2	1	5	4

12	16	25	4	8		
6	15	19	23	2		
5	9	13	17	21		
24	3	7	11	20	24	
18	22	1	10	14	18	22
			4	8	12	16
				2	6	

A variation of the above example, where the skew diagonal sequence is taken in different order, is given below. The resulting magic square is the flipped version of the famous Agrippa's Mars magic square. It is an associative magic square and is the same as that produced by Moschopoulos's method. Here the resulting square starts with 1 placed in the cell which is to the right of the centre cell, and proceeds as De la Loubere's method, with downwards-right move. When a collision occurs, the break move is to shift two cells to the right.

10				20
	10		15	
		10		
	5		10	
0				10

10	0	15	5	20
20	10	0	15	5
5	20	10	0	15
15	5	20	10	0
0	15	5	20	10

1	4	2	5	3
4	2	5	3	1
2	5	3	1	4
5	3	1	4	2
3	1	4	2	5

11	4	17	10	23
24	12	5	18	6
7	25	13	1	19
20	8	21	14	2
3	16	9	22	15

In the previous examples, for the Greek square, the second row can be obtained from the first row by circularly shifting it to the right by one cell. Similarly, the third row is a circularly shifted version of the second row by one cell to the right; and so on. Likewise, the rows of the Latin square is circularly shifted to the left by one cell. The row shifts for the Greek and Latin squares are in mutually opposite direction. It is possible to circularly shift the rows by more than one cell to create the Greek and Latin square.

- For odd ordered squares, whose order is not divisible by three, we can create the Greek squares by shifting a row by two places to the left or to the right to form the next row. The Latin square is made by flipping the Greek square along the main diagonal and interchanging the corresponding letters. This gives us a Latin square whose rows are created by shifting the row in the direction opposite to that of the Greek square. A Greek square and a Latin square should be paired such that their row shifts are in mutually opposite direction. The magic square is obtained by adding the Greek and Latin squares. When the order also happens to be a prime number, this method always creates pandiagonal magic square.

This essentially re-creates the knight's move. All the letters will appear in both the diagonals, ensuring correct diagonal sum. Since there are n! permutations of the Greek letters by which we can create the first row of the Greek square, there are thus n! Greek squares that can be created by shifting the first row in one direction. Likewise, there are n! such Latin squares created by shifting the first row in the opposite direction. Since a Greek square can be combined with any Latin square with opposite row shifts, there are n! × n! such combinations. Lastly, since the Greek square can be created by shifting the rows either to the left or to the right, there are a total of 2 × n! × n! magic squares that can be formed by this method. For n = 5 and 7, since they are prime numbers, this method creates 28,800 and 50,803,200 pandiagonal magic squares. Dividing by 8 to neglect equivalent squares due to rotation and reflections, we obtain 3,600 and 6,350,400 equivalent squares. Further dividing by n^{2} to neglect equivalent panmagic squares due to cyclic shifting of rows or columns, we obtain 144 and 129,600 essentially different panmagic squares. For order 5 squares, these are the only panmagic square there are. The condition that the square's order not be divisible by 3 means that we cannot construct squares of orders 9, 15, 21, 27, and so on, by this method.

In the example below, the square has been constructed such that 1 is at the center cell. In the finished square, the numbers can be continuously enumerated by the knight's move (two cells up, one cell right). When collision occurs, the break move is to move one cell up, one cell left. The resulting square is a pandiagonal magic square. This square also has a further diabolical property that any five cells in quincunx pattern formed by any odd sub-square, including wrap around, sum to the magic constant, 65. For e.g., 13+7+1+20+24, 23+1+9+15+17, 13+21+10+19+2 etc. Also the four corners of any 5×5 square and the central cell, as well as the middle cells of each side together with the central cell, including wrap around, give the magic sum: 13+10+19+22+1 and 20+24+12+8+1. Lastly the four rhomboids that form elongated crosses also give the magic sum: 23+1+9+24+8, 15+1+17+20+12, 14+1+18+13+19, 7+1+25+22+10. Such squares with 1 at the center cell are also called God's magic squares in Islamic amulet design, where the center cell is either left blank or filled with God's name.

10	15	20	0	5
0	5	10	15	20
15	20	0	5	10
5	10	15	20	0
20	0	5	10	15

3	1	4	2	5
4	2	5	3	1
5	3	1	4	2
1	4	2	5	3
2	5	3	1	4

13	16	24	2	10
4	7	15	18	21
20	23	1	9	12
6	14	17	25	3
22	5	8	11	19

We can also combine the Greek and Latin squares constructed by different methods. In the example below, the primary square is made using knight's move. We have re-created the magic square obtained by De la Loubere's method. As before, we can form 8 × (n − 1)! × n! magic squares by this combination. For n = 5 and 7, this will create 23,040 and 29,030,400 magic squares. After dividing by 8 in order to neglect equivalent squares due to rotation and reflection, we get 2,880 and 3,628,800 squares.

15	20	0	5	10
20	0	5	10	15
0	5	10	15	20
5	10	15	20	0
10	15	20	0	5

2	4	1	3	5
3	5	2	4	1
4	1	3	5	2
5	2	4	1	3
1	3	5	2	4

17	24	1	8	15
23	5	7	14	16
4	6	13	20	22
10	12	19	21	3
11	18	25	2	9

For order 5 squares, these three methods give a complete census of the number of magic squares that can be constructed by the method of superposition. Neglecting the rotation and reflections, the total number of magic squares of order 5 produced by the superposition method is 144 + 3,600 + 2,880 = 6,624.

Even squares: We can also construct even ordered squares in this fashion. Since there is no middle term among the Greek and Latin alphabets for even ordered squares, in addition to the first two constraint, for the diagonal sums to yield the magic constant, all the letters in the alphabet should appear in the main diagonal and in the skew diagonal.

An example of a 4×4 square is given below. For the given diagonal and skew diagonal in the Greek square, the rest of the cells can be filled using the condition that each letter appear only once in a row and a column.

α			δ
	δ	α	
	γ	β	
β			γ

α	β	γ	δ
γ	δ	α	β
δ	γ	β	α
β	α	δ	γ

a	b	c	d
d	c	b	a
b	a	d	c
c	d	a	b

αa	βb	γc	δd
γd	δc	αb	βa
δb	γa	βd	αc
βc	αd	δa	γb

1	6	11	16
12	15	2	5
14	9	8	3
7	4	13	10

Using these two Graeco-Latin squares, we can construct 2 × 4! × 4! = 1,152 magic squares. Dividing by 8 to eliminate equivalent squares due to rotation and reflections, we get 144 essentially different magic squares of order 4. These are the only magic squares constructible by the Euler method, since there are only two mutually orthogonal doubly diagonal Graeco-Latin squares of order 4.

Similarly, an 8×8 magic square can be constructed as below. Here the order of appearance of the numbers is not important; however the quadrants imitate the layout pattern of the 4×4 Graeco-Latin squares.

0	8	16	24	32	40	48	56
24	16	8	0	56	48	40	32
48	56	32	40	16	24	0	8
40	32	56	48	8	0	24	16
56	48	40	32	24	16	8	0
32	40	48	56	0	8	16	24
8	0	24	16	40	32	56	48
16	24	0	8	48	56	32	40

1	2	3	4	5	6	7	8
3	4	1	2	7	8	5	6
5	6	7	8	1	2	3	4
7	8	5	6	3	4	1	2
4	3	2	1	8	7	6	5
2	1	4	3	6	5	8	7
8	7	6	5	4	3	2	1
6	5	8	7	2	1	4	3

1	10	19	28	37	46	55	64
27	20	9	2	63	56	45	38
53	62	39	48	17	26	3	12
47	40	61	54	11	4	25	18
60	51	42	33	32	23	14	5
34	41	52	59	6	13	24	31
16	7	30	21	44	35	58	49
22	29	8	15	50	57	36	43

Euler's method has given rise to the study of Graeco-Latin squares. Euler's method for constructing magic squares is valid for any order except 2 and 6.

Variations: Magic squares constructed from mutually orthogonal doubly diagonal Graeco-Latin squares are interesting in themselves since the magic property emerges from the relative position of the alphabets in the square, and not due to any arithmetic property of the value assigned to them. This means that we can assign any value to the alphabets of such squares and still obtain a magic square. This is the basis for constructing squares that display some information (e.g. birthdays, years, etc.) in the square and for creating "reversible squares". For example, we can display the number π ≈ 3.141592 at the bottom row of a 4×4 magic square using the Graeco-Latin square given above by assigning (α, β, γ, δ) = (10, 0, 90, 15) and (a, b, c, d) = (0, 2, 3, 4). We will obtain the following non-normal magic square with the magic sum 124:

10	2	93	19
94	18	12	0
17	90	4	13
3	14	15	92

=== Narayana-De la Hire's method for even orders ===
Narayana-De la Hire's method for odd square is the same as that of Euler's. However, for even squares, we drop the second requirement that each Greek and Latin letter appear only once in a given row or column. This allows us to take advantage of the fact that the sum of an arithmetic progression with an even number of terms is equal to the sum of two opposite symmetric terms multiplied by half the total number of terms. Thus, when constructing the Greek or Latin squares,

- for even ordered squares, a letter can appear n/2 times in a column but only once in a row, or vice versa.

As a running example, if we take a 4×4 square, where the Greek and Latin terms have the values (α, β, γ, δ) = (0, 4, 8, 12) and (a, b, c, d) = (1, 2, 3, 4), respectively, then we have α + β + γ + δ = 2 (α + δ) = 2 (β + γ). Similarly, a + b + c + d = 2 (a + d) = 2 (b + c). This means that the complementary pair α and δ (or β and γ) can appear twice in a column (or a row) and still give the desired magic sum. Thus, we can construct:

- For even ordered squares, the Greek magic square is made by first placing the Greek alphabets along the main diagonal in some order. The skew diagonal is then filled in the same order or by picking the terms that are complementary to the terms in the main diagonal. Finally, the remaining cells are filled column wise. Given a column, we use the complementary terms in the diagonal cells intersected by that column, making sure that they appear only once in a given row but n/2 times in the given column. The Latin square is obtained by flipping or rotating the Greek square and interchanging the corresponding alphabets. The final magic square is obtained by adding the Greek and Latin squares.

In the example given below, the main diagonal (from top left to bottom right) is filled with sequence ordered as α, β, γ, δ, while the skew diagonal (from bottom left to top right) filled in the same order. The remaining cells are then filled column wise such that the complementary letters appears only once within a row, but twice within a column. In the first column, since α appears on the 1st and 4th row, the remaining cells are filled with its complementary term δ. Similarly, the empty cells in the 2nd column are filled with γ; in 3rd column β; and 4th column α. Each Greek letter appears only once along the rows, but twice along the columns. As such, the row sums are α + β + γ + δ while the column sums are either 2 (α + δ) or 2 (β + γ). Likewise for the Latin square, which is obtained by flipping the Greek square along the main diagonal and interchanging the corresponding letters.

α			δ
	β	γ	
	β	γ	
α			δ

α	γ	β	δ
δ	β	γ	α
δ	β	γ	α
α	γ	β	δ

a	d	d	a
c	b	b	c
b	c	c	b
d	a	a	d

αa	γd	βd	δa
δc	βb	γb	αc
δb	βc	γc	αb
αd	γa	βa	δd

1	12	8	13
15	6	10	3
14	7	11	2
4	9	5	16

The above example explains why the "criss-cross" method for doubly even magic square works. Another possible 4×4 magic square, which is also pan-diagonal as well as most-perfect, is constructed below using the same rule. However, the diagonal sequence is chosen such that all four letters α, β, γ, δ appear inside the central 2×2 sub-square. Remaining cells are filled column wise such that each letter appears only once within a row. In the 1st column, the empty cells need to be filled with one of the letters selected from the complementary pair α and δ. Given the 1st column, the entry in the 2nd row can only be δ since α is already there in the 2nd row; while, in the 3rd row the entry can only be α since δ is already present in the 3rd row. We proceed similarly until all cells are filled. The Latin square given below has been obtained by flipping the Greek square along the main diagonal and replacing the Greek alphabets with corresponding Latin alphabets.

α			γ
	γ	α	
	β	δ	
δ			β

α	β	δ	γ
δ	γ	α	β
α	β	δ	γ
δ	γ	α	β

a	d	a	d
b	c	b	c
d	a	d	a
c	b	c	b

αa	βd	δa	γd
δb	γc	αb	βc
αd	βa	δd	γa
δc	γb	αc	βb

1	8	13	12
14	11	2	7
4	5	16	9
15	10	3	6

We can use this approach to construct singly even magic squares as well. However, we have to be more careful in this case since the criteria of pairing the Greek and Latin alphabets uniquely is not automatically satisfied. Violation of this condition leads to some missing numbers in the final square, while duplicating others. Thus, here is an important proviso:

- For singly even squares, in the Greek square, check the cells of the columns which is vertically paired to its complement. In such a case, the corresponding cell of the Latin square must contain the same letter as its horizontally paired cell.

Below is a construction of a 6×6 magic square, where the numbers are directly given, rather than the alphabets. The second square is constructed by flipping the first square along the main diagonal. Here in the first column of the root square the 3rd cell is paired with its complement in the 4th cells. Thus, in the primary square, the numbers in the 1st and 6th cell of the 3rd row are same. Likewise, with other columns and rows. In this example the flipped version of the root square satisfies this proviso.

0	24	18	12	6	30
30	6	12	18	24	0
0	24	12	18	6	30
30	24	12	18	6	0
30	6	18	12	24	0
0	6	18	12	24	30

1	6	1	6	6	1
5	2	5	5	2	2
4	3	3	3	4	4
3	4	4	4	3	3
2	5	2	2	5	5
6	1	6	1	1	6

1	30	19	18	12	31
35	8	17	23	26	2
4	27	15	21	10	34
33	28	16	22	9	3
32	11	20	14	29	5
6	7	24	13	25	36

As another example of a 6×6 magic square constructed this way is given below. Here the diagonal entries are arranged differently. The primary square is constructed by flipping the root square about the main diagonal. In the second square the proviso for singly even square is not satisfied, leading to a non-normal magic square (third square) where the numbers 3, 13, 24, and 34 are duplicated while missing the numbers 4, 18, 19, and 33.

6	30	12	18	0	24
24	0	12	18	30	6
24	0	18	12	30	6
6	30	18	12	0	24
24	0	18	12	30	6
6	30	12	18	0	24

2	5	5	2	5	2
6	1	1	6	1	6
3	3	4	4	4	3
4	4	3	3	3	4
1	6	6	1	6	1
5	2	2	5	2	5

8	35	17	20	5	26
30	1	13	24	31	12
27	3	22	16	34	9
10	34	21	15	3	28
25	6	24	13	36	7
11	32	14	23	2	29

The last condition is a bit arbitrary and may not always need to be invoked, as in this example, where in the root square each cell is vertically paired with its complement:

6	30	12	24	18	0
6	0	18	24	12	30
24	0	12	6	18	30
6	30	18	24	12	0
24	30	12	6	18	0
24	0	18	6	12	30

2	2	5	2	5	5
6	1	1	6	6	1
3	4	3	4	3	4
5	5	2	5	2	2
4	3	4	3	4	3
1	6	6	1	1	6

8	32	17	26	23	5
12	1	19	30	18	31
27	4	15	10	21	34
11	35	20	29	14	2
28	33	16	9	22	3
25	6	24	7	13	36

As one more example, we have generated an 8×8 magic square. Unlike the criss-cross pattern of the earlier section for evenly even square, here we have a checkered pattern for the altered and unaltered cells. Also, in each quadrant the odd and even numbers appear in alternating columns.

0	48	16	32	24	40	8	56
56	8	40	24	32	16	48	0
0	48	16	32	24	40	8	56
56	8	40	24	32	16	48	0
56	8	40	24	32	16	48	0
0	48	16	32	24	40	8	56
56	8	40	24	32	16	48	0
0	48	16	32	24	40	8	56

1	8	1	8	8	1	8	1
7	2	7	2	2	7	2	7
3	6	3	6	6	3	6	3
5	4	5	4	4	5	4	5
4	5	4	5	5	4	5	4
6	3	6	3	3	6	3	6
2	7	2	7	7	2	7	2
8	1	8	1	1	8	1	8

1	56	17	40	32	41	16	57
63	10	47	26	34	23	50	7
3	54	19	38	30	43	14	59
61	12	45	28	36	21	42	5
60	13	44	29	37	20	53	4
6	51	22	35	27	46	11	62
58	15	42	31	39	18	55	2
8	47	24	33	25	48	9	64

Variations: A number of variations of the basic idea are possible: a complementary pair can appear n/2 times or less in a column. That is, a column of a Greek square can be constructed using more than one complementary pair. This method allows us to imbue the magic square with far richer properties. The idea can also be extended to the diagonals too. An example of an 8×8 magic square is given below. In the finished square each of four quadrants are pan-magic squares as well, each quadrant with same magic constant 130.

0	48	56	8	16	32	40	24
56	8	0	48	40	24	16	32
0	48	56	8	16	32	40	24
56	8	0	48	40	24	16	32
48	0	8	56	32	16	24	40
8	56	48	0	24	40	32	16
48	0	8	56	32	16	24	40
8	56	48	0	24	40	32	16

1	8	1	8	7	2	7	2
7	2	7	2	1	8	1	8
8	1	8	1	2	7	2	7
2	7	2	7	8	1	8	1
3	6	3	6	5	4	5	4
5	4	5	4	3	6	3	6
6	3	6	3	4	5	4	5
4	5	4	5	6	3	6	3

1	56	57	16	23	34	47	26
63	10	7	50	41	32	17	40
8	49	64	9	18	39	42	31
58	15	2	55	48	25	24	33
51	6	11	62	37	20	29	44
13	60	53	4	27	46	35	22
54	3	14	59	36	21	28	45
12	61	52	5	30	43	38	19

== Method of borders ==
=== Bordering method for order 3 ===
In this method, the objective is to wrap a border around a smaller magic square which serves as a core. Consider the 3×3 square for example. Subtracting the middle number 5 from each number 1, 2, ..., 9, we obtain 0, ±1, ±2, ±3, and ±4, which we will, for lack of better words, following S. Harry White, refer to as bone numbers. The magic constant of a magic square, which we will refer to as the skeleton square, made by these bone numbers will be zero since adding all the rows of a magic square will give nM = Σ k = 0; thus M = 0.

It is not difficult to argue that the middle number should be placed at the center cell: let x be the number placed in the middle cell, then the sum of the middle column, middle row, and the two diagonals give Σ k + 3 x = 4 M. SinceΣ k = 3 M, we have x = M / 3. Here M = 0, so x = 0.

Putting the middle number 0 in the center cell, we want to construct a border such that the resulting square is magic. Let the border be given by:

u	a	v
b^{∗}	0	b
v^{∗}	a^{∗}	u^{∗}

Since the sum of each row, column, and diagonals must be a constant (which is zero), we have

a + a^{∗} = 0,
b + b^{∗} = 0,
u + u^{∗} = 0,
v + v^{∗} = 0.

Now, if we have chosen a, b, u, and v, then we have a^{∗} = −a, b^{∗} = −b, u^{∗} = −u, and v^{∗} = −v. This means that if we assign a given number to a variable, say a = 1, then its complement will be assigned to a^{∗}, i.e. a^{∗} = −1. Thus out of eight unknown variables, it is sufficient to specify the value of only four variables. We will consider a, b, u, and v as independent variables, while a^{∗}, b^{∗}, u^{∗}, and v^{∗} as dependent variables. This allows us to consider a bone number ±x as a single number regardless of sign because (1) its assignment to a given variable, say a, will automatically imply that the same number of opposite sign will be shared with its complement a^{∗}, and (2) two independent variables, say a and b, cannot be assigned the same bone number. But how should we choose a, b, u, and v? We have the sum of the top row and the sum of the right column as

u + a + v = 0,
v + b + u^{∗} = 0.

Since 0 is an even number, there are only two ways that the sum of three integers will yield an even number: 1) if all three were even, or 2) if two were odd and one was even. Since in our choice of numbers we only have two even non-zero number (±2 and ±4), the first statement is false. Hence, it must be the case that the second statement is true: that two of the numbers are odd and one even.

The only way that both the above two equations can satisfy this parity condition simultaneously, and still be consistent with the set of numbers we have, is when u and v are odd. For on the contrary, if we had assumed u and a to be odd and v to be even in the first equation, then u^{∗} = −u will be odd in the second equation, making b odd as well, in order to satisfy the parity condition. But this requires three odd numbers (u, a, and b), contradicting the fact that we only have two odd numbers (±1 and ±3) which we can use. This proves that the odd bone numbers occupy the corners cells. When converted to normal numbers by adding 5, this implies that the corners of a 3×3 magic square are all occupied by even numbers.

Thus, taking u = 1 and v = 3, we have a = −4 and b = −2. Hence, the finished skeleton square will be as in the left. Adding 5 to each number, we get the finished magic square.

1	−4	3
2	0	−2
−3	4	−1

6	1	8
7	5	3
2	9	4

Similar argument can be used to construct larger squares. Since there does not exist a 2×2 magic square around which we can wrap a border to construct a 4×4 magic square, the next smallest order for which we can construct bordered square is the order 5.

=== Bordering method for order 5 ===
Consider the fifth-order square. For this, we have a 3×3 magic core, around which we will wrap a magic border. The bone numbers to be used will be ±5, ±6, ±7, ±8, ±9, ±10, ±11, and ±12. Disregarding the signs, we have 8 bone numbers, 4 of which are even and 4 of which are odd. In general, for a square of any order n, there will be 4(n − 1) border cells, which are to be filled using 2(n − 1) bone numbers. Let the magic border be given as

u	a	b	c	v
d^{∗}				d
e^{∗}				e
f^{∗}				f
v^{∗}	a^{∗}	b^{∗}	c^{∗}	u^{∗}

As before, we should

- place a bone number and its complement opposite to each other, so that the magic sum will be zero.

It is sufficient to determine the numbers u, v, a, b, c, d, e, f to describe the magic border. As before, we have the two constraint equations for the top row and right column:

u + a + b + c + v = 0
v + d + e + f + u* = 0.

Multiple solutions are possible. The standard procedure is to

- first try to determine the corner cells, after which we will try to determine the rest of the border.

There are 28 ways of choosing two numbers from the set of 8 bone numbers for the corner cells u and v. However, not all pairs are admissible. Among the 28 pairs, 16 pairs are made of an even and an odd number, 6 pairs have both as even numbers, while 6 pairs have them both as odd numbers.

We can prove that the corner cells u and v cannot have an even and an odd number. This is because if this were so, then the sums u + v and v + u^{∗} will be odd, and since 0 is an even number, the sums a + b + c and d + e + f should be odd as well. The only way that the sum of three integers will result in an odd number is when 1) two of them are even and one is odd, or 2) when all three are odd. Since the corner cells are assumed to be odd and even, neither of these two statements are compatible with the fact that we only have 3 even and 3 odd bone numbers at our disposal. This proves that u and v cannot have different parity. This eliminates 16 possibilities.

Using similar type reasoning we can also draw some conclusions about the sets {a, b, c} and {d, e, f}. If u and v are both even, then both the sets should have two odd numbers and one even number. If u and v are both odd, then one of the sets should have three even numbers while the other set should have one even number and two odd numbers.

As a running example, consider the case when both u and v are even. The 6 possible pairs are: (6, 8), (6, 10), (6, 12), (8, 10), (8, 12), and (10, 12). Since the sums u + v and v + u^{∗} are even, the sums a + b + c and d + e + f should be even as well. The only way that the sum of three integers will result in an even number is when 1) two of them are odd and one is even, or 2) when all three are even. The fact that the two corner cells are even means that we have only 2 even numbers at our disposal. Thus, the second statement is not compatible with this fact. Hence, it must be the case that the first statement is true: two of the three numbers should be odd, while one be even.

Now let a, b, d, e be odd numbers while c and f be even numbers. Given the odd bone numbers at our disposal: ±5, ±7, ±9, and ±11, their differences range from D = {±2, ±4, ±6} while their sums range from S = {±12, ±14, ±16, ±18, ±20}. It is also useful to have a table of their sum and differences for later reference. Now, given the corner cells (u, v), we can check its admissibility by checking if the sums u + v + c and v + u^{∗} + f fall within the set D or S. The admissibility of the corner numbers is a necessary but not a sufficient condition for the solution to exist.

For example, if we consider the pair (u, v) = (8, 12), then u + v = 20 and v + u* = 6; and we will have ±6 and ±10 even bone numbers at our disposal. Taking c = ±6, we have the sum u + v + c to be 26 and 14, depending on the sign of ±6 taken, both of which do not fall within the sets D or S. Likewise, taking c = ±10, we have the sum u + v + c to be 30 and 10, both of which again do not fall within the sets D or S. Thus, the pair (8, 12) is not admissible. By similar process of reasoning, we can also rule out the pair (6, 12).

As another example, if we consider the pair (u, v) = (10, 12), then u + v = 22 and v + u^{∗} = 2; and we will have ± 6 and ± 8 even bone numbers at our disposal. Taking c = ±6, we have the sum u + v + c to be 28 and 16. While 28 does not fall within the sets D or S, 16 falls in set S. By inspection, we find that if (a, b) = (−7, − 9), then a + b = −16; and it will satisfy the first constraint equation. Also, taking f = ± 8, we have the sum v + u^{∗} + f to be 10 and -6. While 10 does not fall within the sets D or S, −6 falls in set D. Since −7 and −9 have already been assigned to a and b, clearly (d, e) = (-5, 11) so that d + e = 6; and it will satisfy the second constraint equation.

Likewise, taking c = ±8, we have the sum u + v + c to be 30 and 14. While 30 does not fall within the sets D or S, 14 falls in set S. By inspection, we find that if (a, b) = (−5, −9), then a + b = −14. Also, taking f = ± 6, we have the sum v + u^{∗} + f to be 8 and -4. While 8 does not fall within the sets D or S, −4 falls in set D. Clearly, (d, e) = (−7, 11) so that d + e = 4, and the second constraint equation will be satisfied.

Hence the corner pair (u, v) = (10, 12) is admissible; and it admits two solutions: $(a, b, c, d, e, f) = (-7, -9, -6, -5, 11, -8)$ and $(a, b, c, d, e, f) = ( -5, -9, -8, -7, 11, -6)$. The finished skeleton squares are given below. The magic square is obtained by adding 13 to each cells.

10	-7	-9	-6	12
5				-5
-11				11
8				-8
-12	7	9	6	-10

23	6	4	7	25
18				8
2				24
21				5
1	20	22	19	3

10	-5	-9	-8	12
7				-7
-11				11
6				-6
-12	5	9	8	-10

23	8	4	5	25
20				6
2				24
19				7
1	18	22	21	3

Using similar process of reasoning, we can construct the following table for the values of u, v, a, b, c, d, e, f expressed as bone numbers as given below. There are only 6 possible choices for the corner cells, which leads to 10 possible border solutions.

u, v	a, b, c	d, e, f
12, 10	-6, -7, -9	-11, 5, 8
12, 10	-5, -8, -9	-11, 6, 7
11, 5	6, -10, -12	-9, 7, 8
10, 6	5, -9, -12	-11, 7, 8
10, 6	7, -11, -12	-9, 5, 8
9, 7	5, -10, -11	-12, 6, 8
9, 7	6, -10, -12	-11, 5, 8
8, 6	7, -10, -11	-12, 5, 9
8, 6	9, -11, -12	-10, 5, 7
7, 5	9, -10, -11	-12, 6, 8

Given this group of 10 borders, we can construct 10×8×(3!)^{2} = 2880 essentially different bordered magic squares. Here the bone numbers ±5, ..., ±12 were consecutive. More bordered squares can be constructed if the numbers are not consecutive. If non-consecutive bone numbers were also used, then there are a total of 605 magic borders. Thus, the total number of order 5 essentially different bordered magic squares (with consecutive and non-consecutive numbers) is 174,240. See history. The number of fifth-order magic squares constructible via the bordering method is about 26 times larger than via the superposition method.

=== Continuous enumeration methods ===
Exhaustive enumeration of all the borders of a magic square of a given order, as done previously, is very tedious. As such a structured solution is often desirable, which allows us to construct a border for a square of any order. Below we give three algorithms for constructing border for odd, doubly even, and singly even squares. These continuous enumeration algorithms were discovered in 10th century by Arab scholars; and their earliest surviving exposition comes from the two treatises by al-Buzjani and al-Antaki, although they themselves were not the discoverers. Since then many more such algorithms have been discovered.

Odd-ordered squares: The following is the algorithm given by al-Buzjani to construct a border for odd squares. A peculiarity of this method is that for order n square, the two adjacent corners are numbers $n - 1$ and $n + 1$.

Starting from the cell above the lower left corner, we put the numbers alternately in left column and bottom row until we arrive at the middle cell. The next number is written in the middle cell of the bottom row just reached, after which we fill the cell in the upper left corner, then the middle cell of the right column, then the upper right corner. After this, starting from the cell above middle cell of the right column already filled, we resume the alternate placement of the numbers in the right column and the top row. Once half of the border cells are filled, the other half are filled by numbers complementary to opposite cells. The subsequent inner borders is filled in the same manner, until the square of order 3 is filled.

Below is an example for 9th-order square.

8	80	78	76	75	12	14	16	10
67	22	64	62	61	26	28	24	15
69	55	32	52	51	36	34	27	13
71	57	47	38	45	40	35	25	11
73	59	49	43	41	39	33	23	9
5	19	29	42	37	44	53	63	77
3	17	48	30	31	46	50	65	79
1	58	18	20	21	56	54	60	81
72	2	4	6	7	70	68	66	74

Doubly even order: The following is the method given by al-Antaki. Consider an empty border of order n = 4k with k ≥ 3. The peculiarity of this algorithm is that the adjacent corner cells are occupied by numbers n and $n - 1$.

Starting at the upper left corner cell, we put the successive numbers by groups of four, the first one next to the corner, the second and the third on the bottom, and the fourth at the top, and so on until there remains in the top row (excluding the corners) six empty cells. We then write the next two numbers above and the next four below. We then fill the upper corners, first left then right. We place the next number below the upper right corner in the right column, the next number on the other side in the left column. We then resume placing groups of four consecutive numbers in the two columns as before. Once half of the border cells are filled, the other half are filled by numbers complementary to opposite cells.

The example below gives the border for order 16 square.

15	1	255	254	4	5	251	250	8	9	10	246	245	244	243	16
240															17
18															239
19															238
237															20
236															21
22															235
23															234
233															24
232															25
26															231
27															230
229															28
228															29
30															227
241	256	2	3	253	252	6	7	249	248	247	11	12	13	14	242

For order 8 square, we just begin directly with the six cells.

7	1	2	62	61	60	59	8
56							9
10							55
11							54
53							12
52							13
14							51
57	64	63	3	4	5	6	58

Singly even order: For singly even order, we have the algorithm given by al-Antaki. Here the corner cells are occupied by n and n − 1. Below is an example of 10th-order square.

Start by placing 1 at the bottom row next to the left corner cell, then place 2 in the top row. After this, place 3 at the bottom row and turn around the border in anti-clockwise direction placing the next numbers, until n − 2 is reached on the right column. The next two numbers are placed in the upper corners (n − 1 in upper left corner and n in upper right corner). Then, the next two numbers are placed on the left column, then we resume the cyclic placement of the numbers until half of all the border cells are filled. Once half of the border cells are filled, the other half are filled by numbers complementary to opposite cells.

9	100	2	98	5	94	88	15	84	10
83									18
16									85
87									14
12									89
11									90
93									8
6									95
97									4
91	1	99	3	96	7	13	86	17	92

== Method of composition ==
=== For squares of order m × n where m, n > 2 ===
This is a method reminiscent of the Kronecker product of two matrices, that builds an nm × nm magic square from an n × n magic square and an m × m magic square. The "product" of two magic squares creates a magic square of higher order than the two multiplicands. Let the two magic squares be of orders m and n. The final square will be of order m × n. Divide the square of order m × n into m × m sub-squares, such that there are a total of n^{2} such sub-squares. In the square of order n, reduce by 1 the value of all the numbers. Multiply these reduced values by m^{2}, and place the results in the corresponding sub-squares of the m × n whole square. The squares of order m are added n^{2} times to the sub-squares of the final square. The peculiarity of this construction method is that each magic subsquare will have different magic sums. The square made of such magic sums from each magic subsquare will again be a magic square. The smallest composite magic square of order 9, composed of two order 3 squares is given below.

Order 3
8	1	6
3	5	7
4	9	2

Order 3×3
63	63	63	0	0	0	45	45	45
63	63	63	0	0	0	45	45	45
63	63	63	0	0	0	45	45	45
18	18	18	36	36	36	54	54	54
18	18	18	36	36	36	54	54	54
18	18	18	36	36	36	54	54	54
27	27	27	72	72	72	9	9	9
27	27	27	72	72	72	9	9	9
27	27	27	72	72	72	9	9	9

Order 3×3
71	64	69	8	1	6	53	46	51
66	68	70	3	5	7	48	50	52
67	72	65	4	9	2	49	54	47
26	19	24	44	37	42	62	55	60
21	23	25	39	41	43	57	59	61
22	27	20	40	45	38	58	63	56
35	28	33	80	73	78	17	10	15
30	32	34	75	77	79	12	14	16
31	36	29	76	81	74	13	18	11

Since each of the 3×3 sub-squares can be independently rotated and reflected into 8 different squares, from this single 9×9 composite square we can derive 8^{9} = 134,217,728 essentially different 9×9 composite squares. Plenty more composite magic squares can also be derived if we select non-consecutive numbers in the magic sub-squares, like in Yang Hui's version of the 9×9 composite magic square. The next smallest composite magic squares of order 12, composed of magic squares of order 3 and 4 are given below.

Order 3
2	9	4
7	5	3
6	1	8

Order 4
1	14	11	8
12	7	2	13
6	9	16	3
15	4	5	10

Order 3 × 4
2	9	4	119	126	121	92	99	94	65	72	67
7	5	3	124	122	120	97	95	93	70	68	66
6	1	8	123	118	125	96	91	98	69	64	71
101	108	103	56	63	58	11	18	13	110	117	112
106	104	102	61	59	57	16	14	12	115	113	111
105	100	107	60	55	62	15	10	17	114	109	116
47	54	49	74	81	76	137	144	139	20	27	22
52	50	48	79	77	75	142	140	138	25	23	21
51	46	53	78	73	80	141	136	143	24	19	26
128	135	130	29	36	31	38	45	40	83	90	85
133	131	129	34	32	30	43	41	39	88	86	84
132	127	134	33	28	35	42	37	44	87	82	89

Order 4 × 3
17	30	27	24	129	142	139	136	49	62	59	56
28	23	18	29	140	135	130	141	60	55	50	61
22	25	32	19	134	137	144	131	54	57	64	51
31	20	21	26	143	132	133	138	63	52	53	58
97	110	107	104	65	78	75	72	33	46	43	40
108	103	98	109	76	71	66	77	44	39	34	45
102	105	112	99	70	73	80	67	38	41	48	35
111	100	101	106	79	68	69	74	47	36	37	42
81	94	91	88	1	14	11	8	113	126	123	120
92	87	82	93	12	7	2	13	124	119	114	125
86	89	96	83	6	9	16	3	118	121	128	115
95	84	85	90	15	4	5	10	127	116	117	122

For the base squares, there is only one essentially different 3rd order square, while there 880 essentially different 4th-order squares that we can choose from. Each pairing can produce two different composite squares. Since each magic sub-squares in each composite square can be expressed in 8 different forms due to rotations and reflections, there can be 1×880×8^{9} + 880×1×8^{16} ≈ 2.476×10^{17} essentially different 12×12 composite magic squares created this way, with consecutive numbers in each sub-square. In general, if there are c_{m} and c_{n} essentially different magic squares of order m and n, then we can form c_{m} × c_{n} × ( 8^{m^{2}} + 8^{n^{2}}) composite squares of order mn, provided m ≠ n. If m = n, then we can form (c_{m})^{2} × 8^{m^{2}} composite squares of order m^{2}.

=== For squares of doubly even order ===
When the squares are of doubly even order, we can construct a composite magic square in a manner more elegant than the above process, in the sense that every magic subsquare will have the same magic constant. Let n be the order of the main square and m the order of the equal subsquares. The subsquares are filled one by one, in any order, with a continuous sequence of m^{2}/2 smaller numbers (i.e. numbers less than or equal to n^{2}/2) together with their complements to n^{2} + 1. Each subsquare as a whole will yield the same magic sum. The advantage of this type of composite square is that each subsquare is filled in the same way and their arrangement is arbitrary. Thus, the knowledge of a single construction of even order will suffice to fill the whole square. Furthermore, if the subsquares are filled in the natural sequence, then the resulting square will be pandiagonal. The magic sum of the subsquares is related to the magic sum of the whole square by $M_m = \frac{M_n}{k}$ where n = km.

In the examples below, we have divided the order 12 square into nine subsquares of order 4 filled each with eight smaller numbers and, in the corresponding bishop's cells (two cells diagonally across, including wrap arounds, in the 4×4 subsquare), their complements to n^{2} + 1 = 145. Each subsquare is pandiagonal with magic constant 290; while the whole square on the left is also pandiagonal with magic constant 870.

1	142	139	8	9	134	131	16	17	126	123	24
140	7	2	141	132	15	10	133	124	23	18	125
6	137	144	3	14	129	136	11	22	121	128	19
143	4	5	138	135	12	13	130	127	20	21	122
25	118	115	32	33	110	107	40	41	102	99	48
116	31	26	117	108	39	34	109	100	47	42	101
30	113	120	27	38	105	112	35	46	97	104	43
119	28	29	114	111	36	37	106	103	44	45	98
49	94	91	56	57	86	83	64	65	78	75	72
92	55	50	93	84	63	58	85	76	71	66	77
54	89	96	51	62	81	88	59	70	73	80	67
95	52	53	90	87	60	61	82	79	68	69	74

69	74	79	68	29	114	119	28	61	82	87	60
75	72	65	78	115	32	25	118	83	64	57	86
66	77	76	71	26	117	116	31	58	85	84	63
80	67	70	73	120	27	30	113	88	59	62	81
21	122	127	20	53	90	95	52	13	130	135	12
123	24	17	126	91	56	49	94	131	16	9	134
18	125	124	23	50	93	92	55	10	133	132	15
128	19	22	121	96	51	54	89	136	11	14	129
45	98	103	44	5	138	143	4	37	106	111	36
99	48	41	102	139	8	1	142	107	40	33	110
42	101	100	47	2	141	140	7	34	109	108	39
104	43	46	97	144	3	6	137	112	35	38	105

In another example below, we have divided the order 12 square into four order 6 squares. Each of the order 6 squares are filled with eighteen small numbers and their complements using bordering technique given by al-Antaki. If we remove the shaded borders of the order 6 subsquares and form an order 8 square, then this order 8 square is again a magic square. In its full generality, we can take any m^{2}/2 smaller numbers together with their complements to n^{2} + 1 to fill the subsquares, not necessarily in continuous sequence.

60	82	88	56	90	59	24	118	124	20	126	23
64	69	74	79	68	81	28	33	110	115	32	117
83	75	72	65	78	62	119	111	36	29	114	26
84	66	77	76	71	61	120	30	113	112	35	25
58	80	67	70	73	87	22	116	31	34	109	123
86	63	57	89	55	85	122	27	21	125	19	121
6	136	142	2	144	5	42	100	106	38	108	41
10	15	128	133	14	135	46	51	92	97	50	99
137	129	18	11	132	8	101	93	54	47	96	44
138	12	131	130	17	7	102	48	95	94	53	43
4	134	13	16	127	141	40	98	49	52	91	105
140	9	3	143	1	139	104	45	39	107	37	103

=== Medjig method for squares of even order 2n, where n > 2 ===
In this method a magic square is "multiplied" with a Medjig square to create a larger magic square. The namesake of this method derives from mathematical game called Medjig created by Willem Barink in 2006, although the method itself is much older. An early instance of a magic square constructed using this method occurs in Yang Hui's text for order 6 magic square. The LUX method to construct singly even magic squares is a special case of the Medjig method, where only 3 out of 24 patterns are used to construct the Medjig square.

The pieces of the Medjig puzzle are 2×2 squares on which the numbers 0, 1, 2 and 3 are placed. There are three basic patterns by which the numbers 0, 1, 2 and 3 can be placed in a 2×2 square, where 0 is at the top left corner:

0	1
2	3

0	1
3	2

0	2
3	1

Each pattern can be reflected and rotated to obtain 8 equivalent patterns, giving us a total of 3×8 = 24 patterns. The aim of the puzzle is to take n^{2} Medjig pieces and arrange them in an n × n Medjig square in such a way that each row, column, along with the two long diagonals, formed by the Medjig square sums to 3n, the magic constant of the Medjig square. An n × n Medjig square can create a 2n × 2n magic square where n > 2.

Given an n×n Medjig square and an n×n magic square base, a magic square of order 2n×2n can be constructed as follows:

- Each cell of an n×n magic square is associated with a corresponding 2×2 subsquare of the Medjig square
- Fill each 2×2 subsquares of the Medjig square with the four numbers from 1 to 4n^{2} that equal the original number modulo n^{2}, i.e. x+n^{2}y where x is the corresponding number from the magic square and y is a number from 0 to 3 in the 2×2 subsquares.

Assuming that we have an initial magic square base, the challenge lies in constructing a Medjig square. For reference, the sums of each Medjig piece along the rows, columns and diagonals, denoted in italics, are:

1	0	1	
5	2	3	
3	2	4	3

1	0	1	
5	3	2	
4	3	3	2

2	0	2	
4	3	1	
5	3	3	1

Doubly even squares: The smallest even ordered Medjig square is of order 2 with magic constant 6. While it is possible to construct a 2×2 Medjig square, we cannot construct a 4×4 magic square from it since 2×2 magic squares required to "multiply" it does not exist. Nevertheless, it is worth constructing these 2×2 Medjig squares. The magic constant 6 can be partitioned into two parts in three ways as 6 = 5 + 1 = 4 + 2 = 3 + 3. There exist 96 such 2×2 Medjig squares. In the examples below, each 2×2 Medjig square is made by combining different orientations of a single Medjig piece.

Medjig 2×2
0	1	3	2
2	3	1	0
3	2	0	1
1	0	2	3

Medjig 2×2
0	1	2	3
3	2	1	0
1	0	3	2
2	3	0	1

Medjig 2×2
0	2	3	1
3	1	0	2
0	2	3	1
3	1	0	2

We can use the 2×2 Medjig squares to construct larger even ordered Medjig squares. One possible approach is to simply combine the 2×2 Medjig squares together. Another possibility is to wrap a smaller Medjig square core with a Medjig border. The pieces of a 2×2 Medjig square can form the corner pieces of the border. Yet another possibility is to append a row and a column to an odd ordered Medjig square. An example of an 8×8 magic square is constructed below by combining four copies of the left most 2×2 Medjig square given above:

Order 4
1	14	4	15
8	11	5	10
13	2	16	3
12	7	9	6

Medjig 4 × 4
0	1	3	2	0	1	3	2
2	3	1	0	2	3	1	0
3	2	0	1	3	2	0	1
1	0	2	3	1	0	2	3
0	1	3	2	0	1	3	2
2	3	1	0	2	3	1	0
3	2	0	1	3	2	0	1
1	0	2	3	1	0	2	3

Order 8
1	17	62	46	4	20	63	47
33	49	30	14	36	52	31	15
56	40	11	27	53	37	10	26
24	8	43	59	21	5	42	58
13	29	50	34	16	32	51	35
45	61	18	2	48	64	19	3
60	44	7	23	57	41	6	22
28	12	39	55	25	9	38	54

The next example is constructed by bordering a 2×2 Medjig square core.

Order 4
1	14	4	15
8	11	5	10
13	2	16	3
12	7	9	6

Medjig 4 × 4
0	1	0	1	2	3	3	2
2	3	3	2	1	0	1	0
0	3	0	2	3	1	0	3
1	2	3	1	0	2	1	2
2	1	0	2	3	1	2	1
3	0	3	1	0	2	3	0
3	2	0	1	2	3	0	1
1	0	3	2	1	0	2	3

Order 8
1	17	14	30	36	52	63	47
33	49	62	46	20	4	31	15
8	56	11	43	53	21	10	58
24	40	59	27	5	37	26	42
45	29	2	34	64	32	35	19
61	13	50	18	16	48	51	3
60	44	7	23	41	57	6	22
28	12	55	39	25	9	38	54

Singly even squares: Medjig square of order 1 does not exist. As such, the smallest odd ordered Medjig square is of order 3, with magic constant 9. There are only 7 ways of partitioning the integer 9, our magic constant, into three parts. If these three parts correspond to three of the Medjig pieces in a row, column or diagonal, then the relevant partitions for us are:

9 = 1 + 3 + 5 = 1 + 4 + 4 = 2 + 3 + 4 = 2 + 2 + 5 = 3 + 3 + 3.

A 3×3 Medjig square can be constructed with some trial-and-error, as in the left most square below. Another approach is to add a row and a column to a 2×2 Medjig square. In the middle square below, a left column and bottom row has been added, creating an L-shaped Medjig border, to a 2×2 Medjig square given previously. The right most square below is essentially same as the middle square, except that the row and column has been added in the middle to form a cross while the pieces of 2×2 Medjig square are placed at the corners.

Medjig 3 × 3
2	3	0	2	0	2
1	0	3	1	3	1
3	1	1	2	2	0
0	2	0	3	3	1
3	2	2	0	0	2
0	1	3	1	1	3

Medjig 3 × 3
0	3	0	1	3	2
2	1	2	3	1	0
3	0	3	2	0	1
2	1	1	0	2	3
0	1	3	1	3	1
2	3	0	2	0	2

Medjig 3 × 3
0	1	0	3	3	2
2	3	2	1	1	0
3	1	0	1	3	1
0	2	2	3	0	2
3	2	3	0	0	1
1	0	2	1	2	3

Once a 3×3 Medjig square has been constructed, it can be converted into a 6×6 magic square. For example, using the left most 3×3 Medjig square given above:

Order 3
8	1	6
3	5	7
4	9	2

Medjig 3 × 3
2	3	0	2	0	2
1	0	3	1	3	1
3	1	1	2	2	0
0	2	0	3	3	1
3	2	2	0	0	2
0	1	3	1	1	3

Order 6
26	35	1	19	6	24
17	8	28	10	33	15
30	12	14	23	25	7
3	21	5	32	34	16
31	22	27	9	2	20
4	13	36	18	11	29

There are 1,740,800 such 3×3 Medjig squares. An easy approach to construct higher order odd Medjig square is by wrapping a smaller odd ordered Medjig square with a Medjig border, just as with even ordered Medjig squares. Another approach is to append a row and a column to an even ordered Medjig square. Approaches such as the LUX method can also be used. In the example below, a 5×5 Medjig square is created by wrapping a Medjig border around a 3×3 Medjig square given previously:

Order 5
17	24	1	8	15
23	5	7	14	16
4	6	13	20	22
10	12	19	21	3
11	18	25	2	9

Medjig 5 × 5
0	1	3	1	0	1	3	1	3	2
2	3	0	2	2	3	0	2	1	0
3	0	2	3	0	2	0	2	1	2
1	2	1	0	3	1	3	1	3	0
0	2	3	1	1	2	2	0	1	3
1	3	0	2	0	3	3	1	0	2
3	0	3	2	2	0	0	2	1	2
1	2	0	1	3	1	1	3	3	0
3	2	1	3	1	0	1	3	0	1
1	0	2	0	3	2	2	0	2	3

Order 10
17	42	99	49	1	26	83	33	90	65
67	92	24	74	51	76	8	58	40	15
98	23	55	80	7	57	14	64	41	66
48	73	30	5	82	32	89	39	91	16
4	54	81	31	38	63	70	20	47	97
29	79	6	56	13	88	95	45	22	72
85	10	87	62	69	19	21	71	28	53
35	60	12	37	94	44	46	96	78	3
86	61	43	93	100	25	27	77	9	34
36	11	68	18	95	75	52	2	59	84
