= Siamese =

Siamese describes something of or related to Siam (now called Thailand), or more specifically the region of Central Thailand, usually including Southern Thailand.

Siamese may refer to:

== Animals ==
- Siamese cat, a domestic cat breed
- Siamese crocodile, a species of crocodile
- Siamese mud carp, a species of freshwater fish in the carp family, Cyprinidae
- Siamese algae eater, a species of freshwater fish in the carp family, Cyprinidae
- Siamese fighting fish, a species of fish from genus Betta
- Siamese fireback, Lophura diardi, the national bird of Thailand
- Siamese tigerfish, a species of fish from genus Datnioides, tiger perch

== Other uses ==
- Conjoined twins or Siamese twins, identical twins joined in utero
  - Chang and Eng Bunker, The "Siamese Twins", Siamese-American conjoined twin brothers from whom the term derives
- Siamese (band), formerly Siamese Fighting Fish, Danish rock and metal band
- Siamese connection or a splitter in fire protection engineering
- Siamese method, a mathematical method described by Simon de la Loubère
- Sukhothai language, a kind of Thai topolect, by the end of the 18th century, they gradually diverged into regional variants, which subsequently developed into the modern Central Thai and Southern Thai.
  - Central Thai language or Siamese language, the sole official language of Thailand and first language of most people in Central Thailand and include Thai Chinese in Southern Thailand (Known in Southern Thai as Leang Ka Luang (Thai: แหลงข้าหลวง)).
  - Southern Thai language, or Southern Siamese language, or Tambralinga language, language of Southern Thailand first language of most people in Southern Thailand
- Thai people, Siamese people, Central/Southern Thai people or Thai noi people, an ethnic group from Central Thailand and Southern Thailand
  - Khorat Thai, ethnic groups in Nakhon Ratchasima Province.
  - Malaysian Siamese, ethnic groups in Northern Peninsular Malaysia.
  - Koh Kong people, ethnic groups in Koh Kong.
  - Tanintharyi Thai, Thai minority in Tanintharyi.
  - Yodaya people, Bamar with Thai ancestry in Central Myanmar.

== See also ==
- Siamese twins (disambiguation)
- Siam (disambiguation)
- Thai (disambiguation)
