= Thai Empire =

Thai Empire may refer to:

- Great Thai Empire, a name used under the idea of Pan-Thaiism in the 1930s–1940s
- Other historical kingdoms of Thailand; see Siam (disambiguation)
