= Arnaud Courlet de Vregille =

French painter (born 1958)

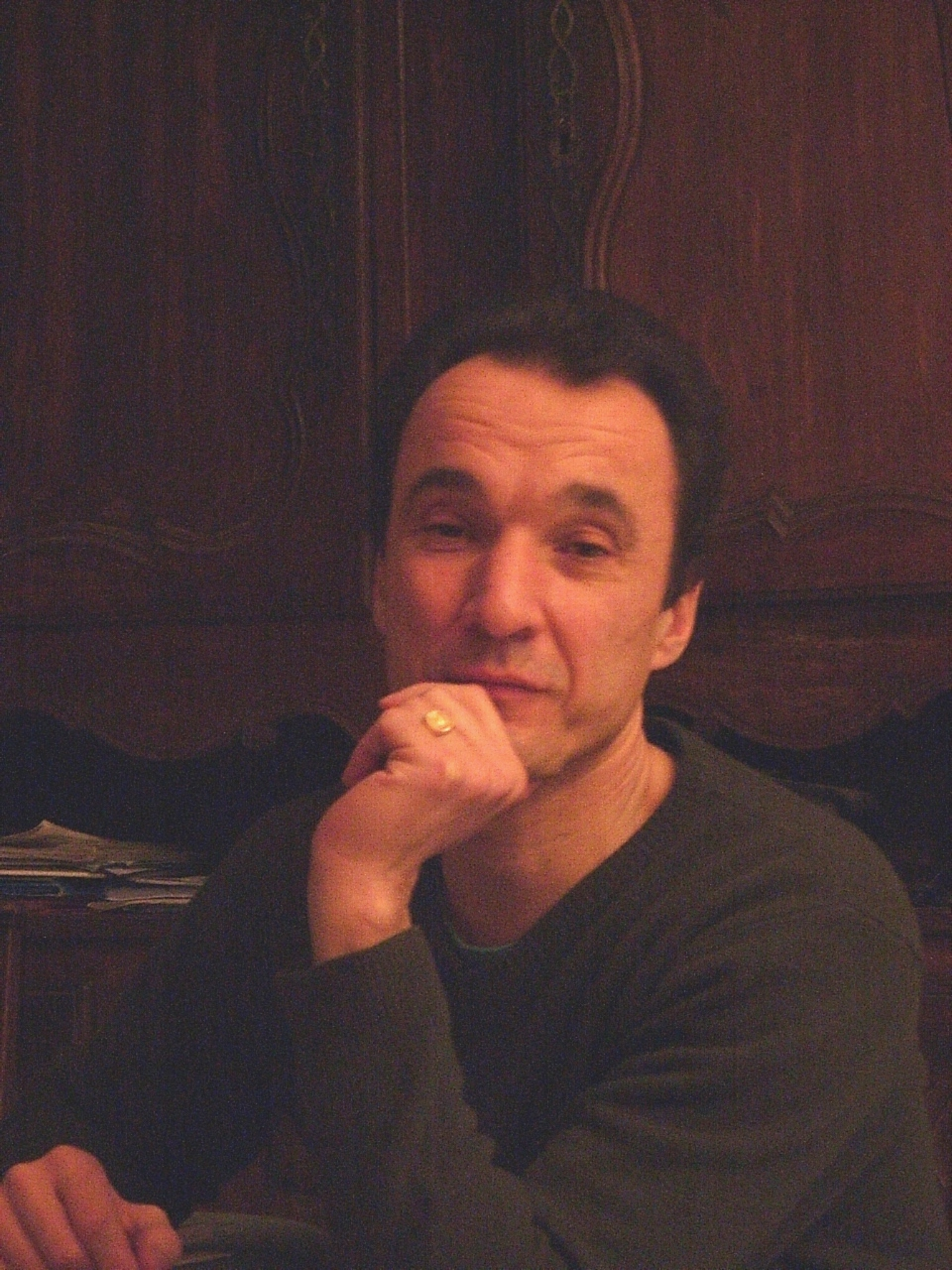
- Arnaud Courlet de Vregille, in 2007
- Born: Arnaud Courlet de Vregille; 5 March 1958 (age 68); Bourges, France
- Known for: Painting, Printmaking

Arnaud Courlet de Vregille (born 5 March 1958) is a French painter.

== Biography ==
Born into a family of painters and collectors related to Otto van Veen, Peter Paul Rubens' teacher, Arnaud Courlet de Vregille began to draw at a very early age and subsequently embarked on a painting-career : paintings, murals (fresco), theatre decors. In 1993, his talent as a painter was revealed when the Institut Supérieur de Paris awarded him a prize for his work Laisse-moi which work was acquired by the Ministry of Finance for the decoration of the Cité Administrative de Bobigny.

The painter lives in Besançon (Doubs) where he pursues his artistic career. His work is known in France but also in Armenia and Russia.

== A style ==
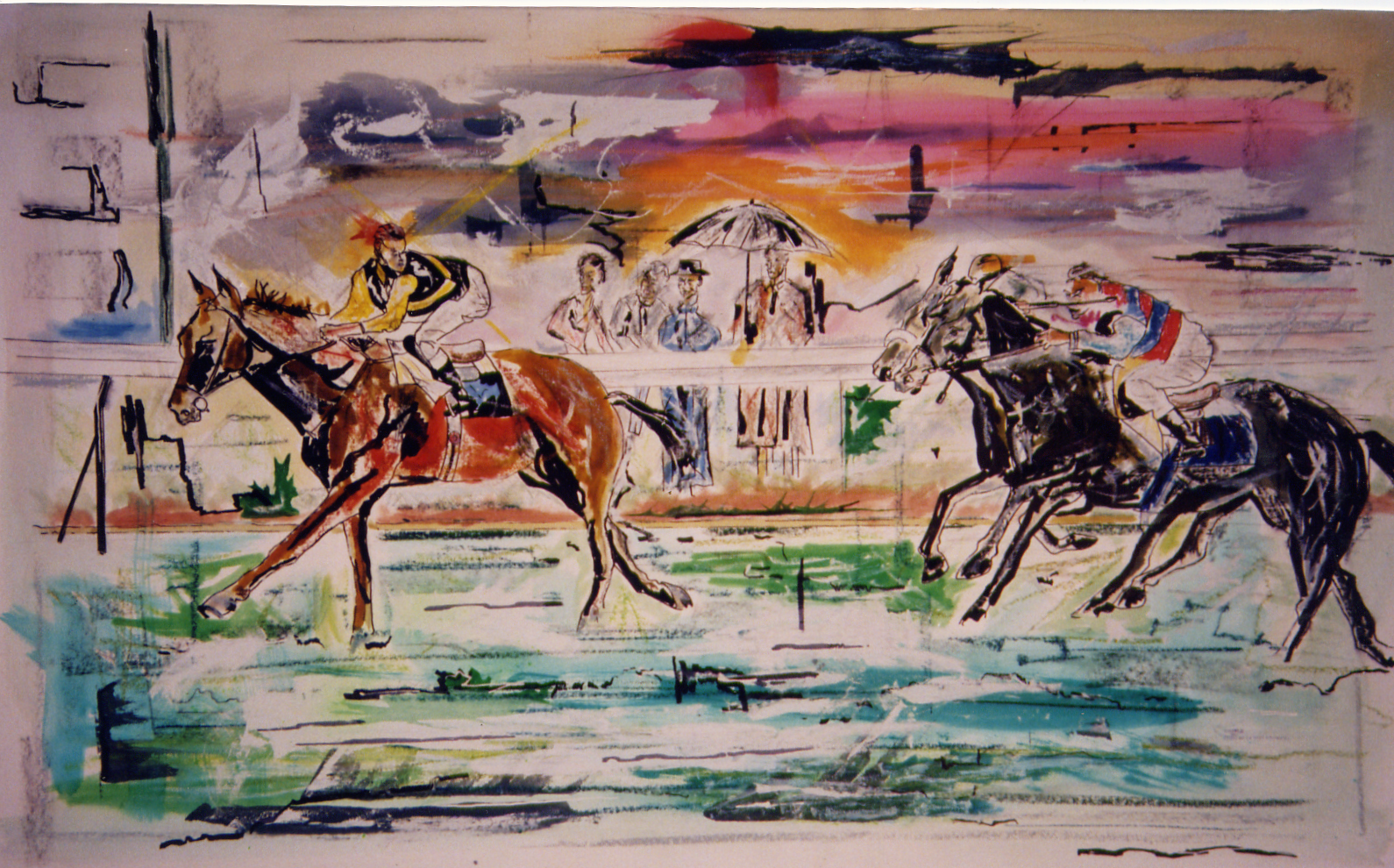
Douard III (1996, Acrylic and pastel, 120 x 80)

The Who's Who Art considers his art as a "lyrical abstraction", "futurism", "spontaneous painting". In 2004, the Encyclopédie des Arts en Franche-Comté dedicated him a reference article :

"Painter who does not fit into any fixed category, exploring the very depths of abstract art in order to bring to the surface the merest of the figurative. His painting, which seems to emerge from a kind of coloured skin, expresses all the warmth of tortured reality. In the words of the artists, he paints his canvases both impulsively and after a phase of blending and condensing which are the fruits of lengthy period of preparation within himself. He marks some of his works with an often partially concealed circle of solitude which shatters to evoke the moment when reality become fragile and crakcks, giving way to the invisible as well as displaying the puzzling conspicuousness of visible. The emotion which pervades his painting seems to spring from his movement, his violence, his light".

On the occasion of the bicentenary exhibition of Claude Nicolas Ledoux (renowned French architect of the 18th century) at the Royal Saltworks in Arc-et-Senans, Franche-Comté (site listed as World Heritage by Unesco), the catalog Le deuxième regard wrote :

"The painting of Courlet de Vregille enters into an almost natural relation with the inspiration of Ledoux; indeed both explore those paths which Bachelard referred to as "materialised imagination, that spiritual place where all forms of art converge and meet."

"Following a very contemporary trend, an expression of the point of view of one art on another, which resumes here in an independent vision the wonder of new discovery", a portrait of the Lumière brothers : Lumière ou Projection privée (Light or Private projection), is exhibited in l'Eden Théâtre de La Ciotat. L'Eden Théâtre, heritage label of the 20th century, was restored in 2013 within the framework of Marseille-Provence 2013, European capital of culture.

== Shows ==
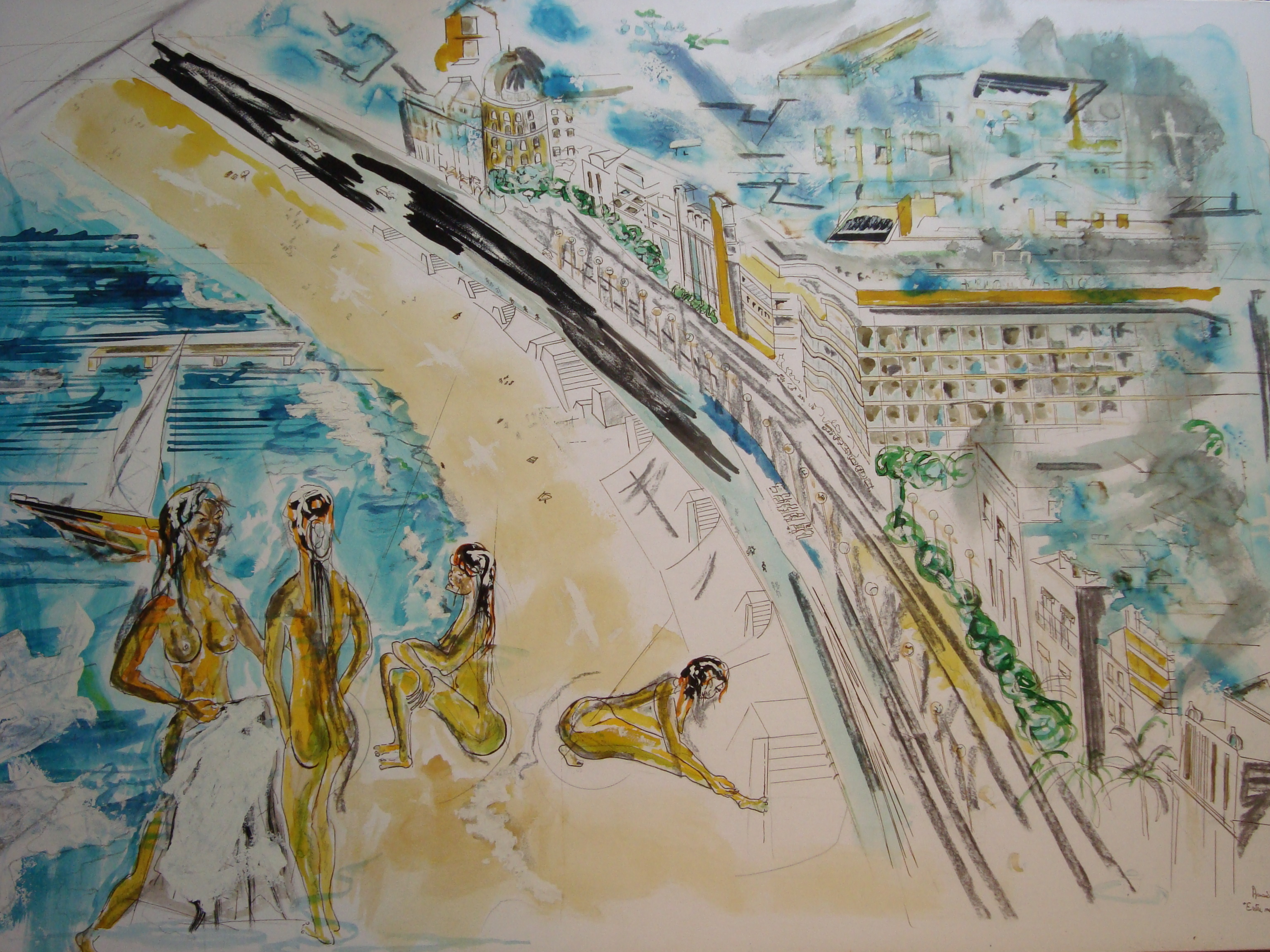
La baie des Anges (1994, Acrylic, 80 x 60)

- Exposition décoration Cité Administrative de Bobigny (Paris, 1993)
- Galerie Barthélémy (Besançon, 1993)
- Salon Victor Chocquet, Ministry of Finances (Paris, 1995, 1996, 1997, 1998, 1999, 2000, 2001, 2007)
- Exposition pour le bicentenaire du Cadastre, école nationale du Cadastre (Toulouse, 2007)
- Galerie Everarts (Paris, 2001)
- Salon de Peinture et Sculpture des Armées Nord-est (Douai, 2002)
- Salon National de Peinture et Sculpture des Armées (Château de Vincennes, 2002)
- Château de Syam (Syam, 2005)
- Exposition Désert Art’ique (Besançon, 2006)
- Exposition pour le bicentenaire de Claude Nicolas Ledoux (Besançon, Conseil Général, 2006)
- Salines royales d'Arc-et-Senans, (Arc-et-Senans 2006)
- Festival de Peinture et de Sculpture de Belfort (Belfort, 2007, 2008)
- Exposition pour le bicentenaire du Cadastre, Ecole nationale du Cadastre (Toulouse, 2007)
- Exposition dans le cadre du 16e salon d'art Richelieu, 2017
- Exposition Art et foi, Chapelle des Annonciades, Pontarlier, 2019
- Exposition Blick in die Zukunft, Fribourg-en-Brisgau, 2019
- Exposition Regards d'artistes sur l'avenir, Besançon, October 2019
- Exposition au Château de Moncley, 2020

=== Jury of Paris exhibitions ===
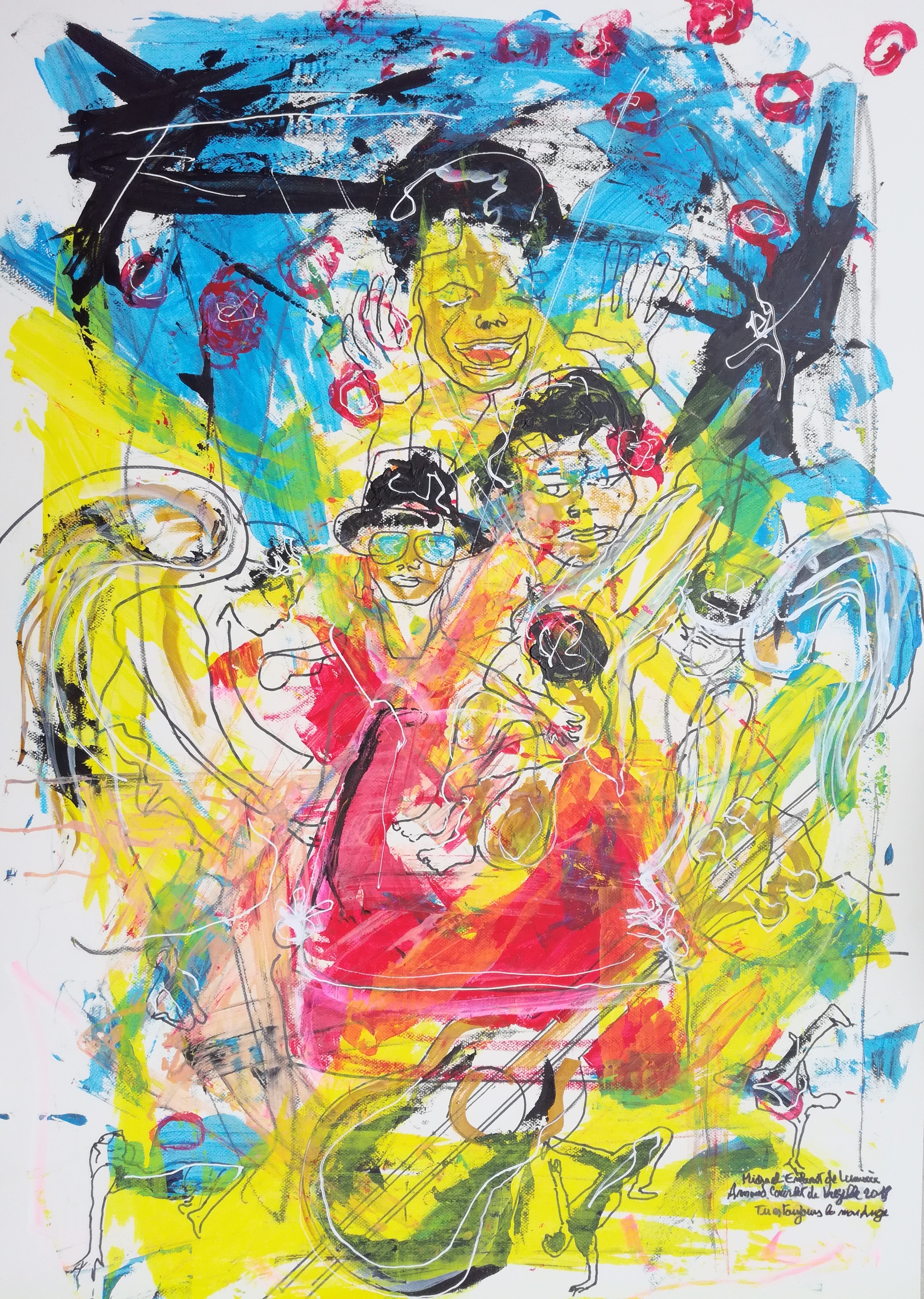
Michael Enfant de Lumière (2018, Acrylic, 90 x 120)

- Laurence Cavy, Christie’s
- Françoise de Perthuis, Gazette Drouot
- Claude Maruno, Expert of 19e and contemporary art
- Edmond Laznikas, Critic
- Georges Véaud, President of the Société Historique et Archéologique, Paris (XIV)
- Jean-Paul Welzer, Expert of contemporary painting

=== Auctioneers Paris exhibitions ===
- Pierre Cornette de Saint-Cyr
- Guy Loudemer
- Maître Pillon
- Maître Machoïr

== Exhibitions ==
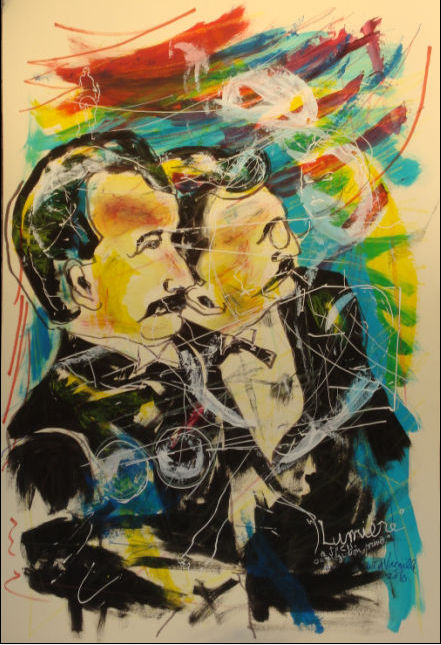
Lumière ou Projection privée (2010, Acrylic and Pastel, 90 x 120)

- Hôtel de Paris (Besançon, 1994)
- Citadelle de Besançon (Besançon, 1996)
- Avenue George V (Paris, 1998, 1999)
- Galerie Vauban (Dijon, 1999)
- Atelier Pierre Beuchey (Besançon, 2000)
- Relais culturel des Saintes-Maries-de-la-Mer (2001)
- Galerie Everarts (Paris, 2001)
- Pianos Jean Michel Maître (Besançon, 2008)
- Journée du Patrimoine (Dampierre-sur-Salon, Maison Couyba, 2012)
- Salon du livre (Dampierre-sur-Salon 2009, 2012, with musical accompaniment of Hasan Bakalli, violinist for the Orchestre de Besançon Franche-Comté, Pays de Montbéliard)
- Rectorat Académie de Besançon (Besançon, 2012)
- 16ème Salon de l'Art Richelieu (2017)
- Journée du patrimoine, Château de Vaire (2018)
- Data Music, Besançon (2023, 2019)
- Château de Savigny-le-Vieux, Curgy (2026, 2025)

== Distinctions and rewards ==
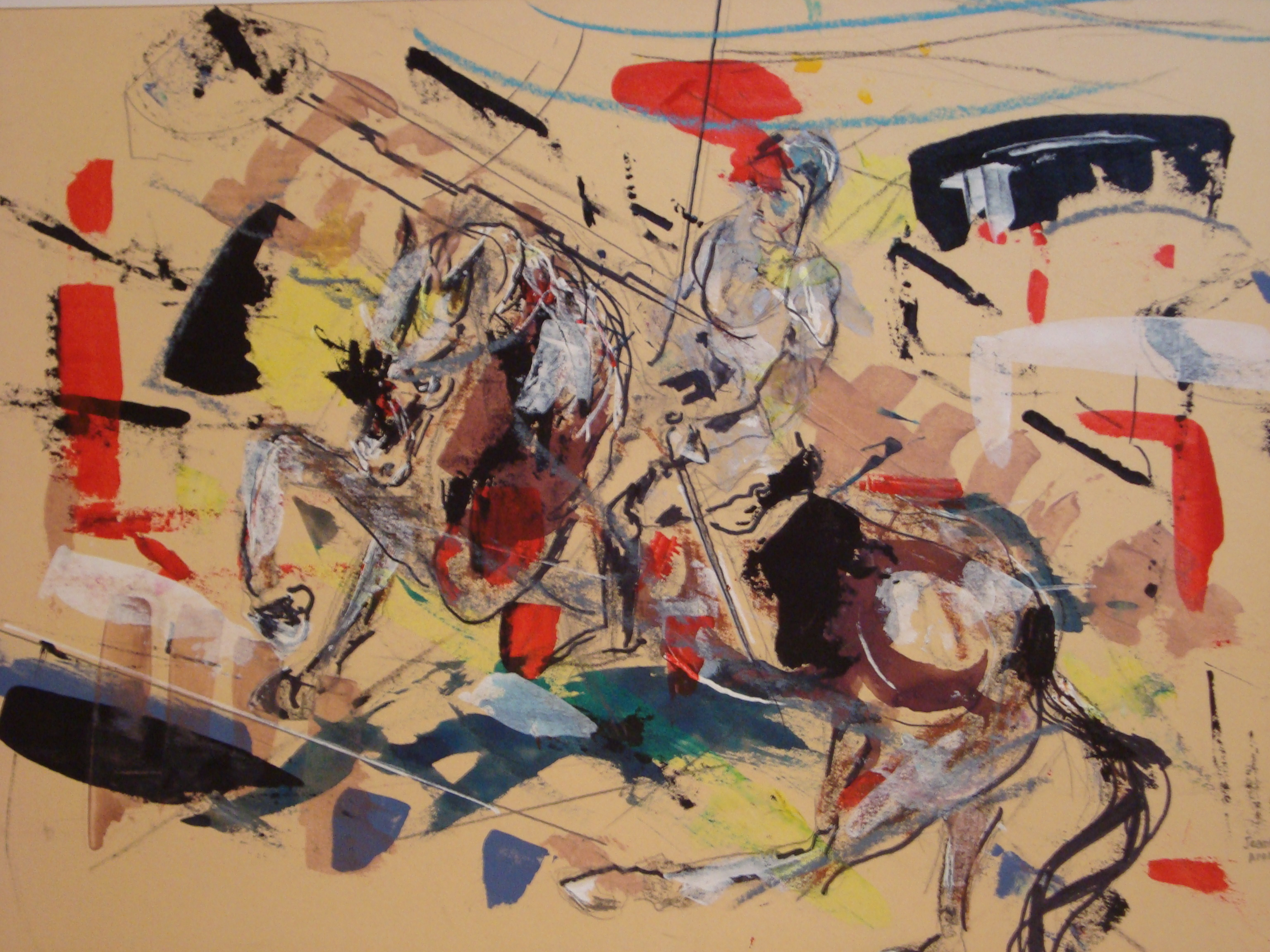
Jehanne 1429 (1999, Acrylic and pastel, 60 x 40)

- 1er Prix Institut Supérieur des Arts de Paris (Paris, 1993, Laisse-moi)
- Mention spéciale, Salon Victor Chocquet (Paris, 1995, Archi)
- Nomination, Salon Victor Chocquet (Paris, 1996, Une heure dans la nuit)
- Mention spéciale, Salon Victor Chocquet (Paris, 1998, Quand le Scarabée d’Or)
- Nomination, Salon Victor Chocquet (Paris, 2000, Soliman le magnifique)
- Prix Argenson, Galerie Everarts (Paris, 2001, Quand le Scarabée d’Or)
- Prix de Poésie, Salon Victor Chocquet (Paris, 2007, « Ecris pour moi »)
- Invité d'honneur du 16ème salon de l'Art Richelieu, 2017

== Sources ==
Catalogs of exhibitions

- "Art concours 1993"
- Salon Victor Chocquet, Ministère des Finances (Paris, 1995, 1996, 1997, 1998, 1999, 2000, 2001, 2007)
- Galeries Everarts (2001)
- Festival de Peinture et de Sculpture de Belfort (Belfort, 2007, 2008)
- Association AC'Bizard (Dampierre-sur-Salon (70), Maison Couyba, 2009, 2012)

Regional press

- L'Est Républicain (1993, 1994, 1996, 1998, 1999, 2002, 2007, 2012, 2023)
- La Provence (2001, 2005)
- Arts Sports Voyages (1995, 1996, 1997, 1998, 1999, 2000, 2001, 2007)
- Vosges Matin (2014)
- Le Progrès (2023)
- L'Est Républicain (2023)
- Dernières Nouvelles d'Alsace (2023)
- Alsace (2023)
- Journal de Saône-et-Loire (2023, 2025)
- Le Bien Public (2023)

France télévisions

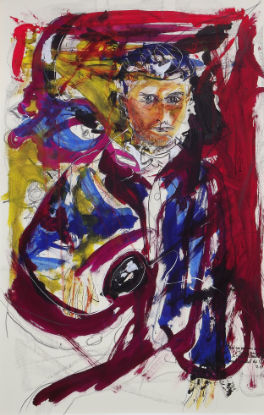
Lautréamont (2012, Acrylic, 90 x 120)

- "Les artistes rencontrent leur public à l'atelier" (September 2000)
- "La résidence d'artistes" (September 2002)
- "Le deuxième regard" (October 2006)

Radio broadcast

- Radio Shalom (October 2025 ; February 2016 ; October 2014)
- RCF Radio (October 2025 ; April 2019 ; October 2014 ; September 2012)

=== Other ===
- Perséides, Collection of paintings illustrated by the texts of Jacques-Rittaud Hutinet, Bègles, L'Ecouleur de la vie, 2019, (ISBN 9791069932395), (100 numbered copies).
- L'Essentiel, Bourgogne Franche-Comté, Besançon, Sodiex Editions, été 2019 str. 42, automne 2023, p. 27.
- Couleurs 2016, with six reproductions, Pirey, éd. Néo-Print 25 Pirey, 2015 (50 numbered copies).
