= Siam (name) =

Siam is a person name. People with the name include:

== Surname ==
- Islam Siam (born 1985), Egyptian footballer
- Said Siam (1959–2009), Palestinian politician and Hamas member

== Given name ==
- Siam Hanghal (born 1993), Indian footballer

== See also ==
- Siam (disambiguation)
