= Alphonse Jobez =

French businessman and politician

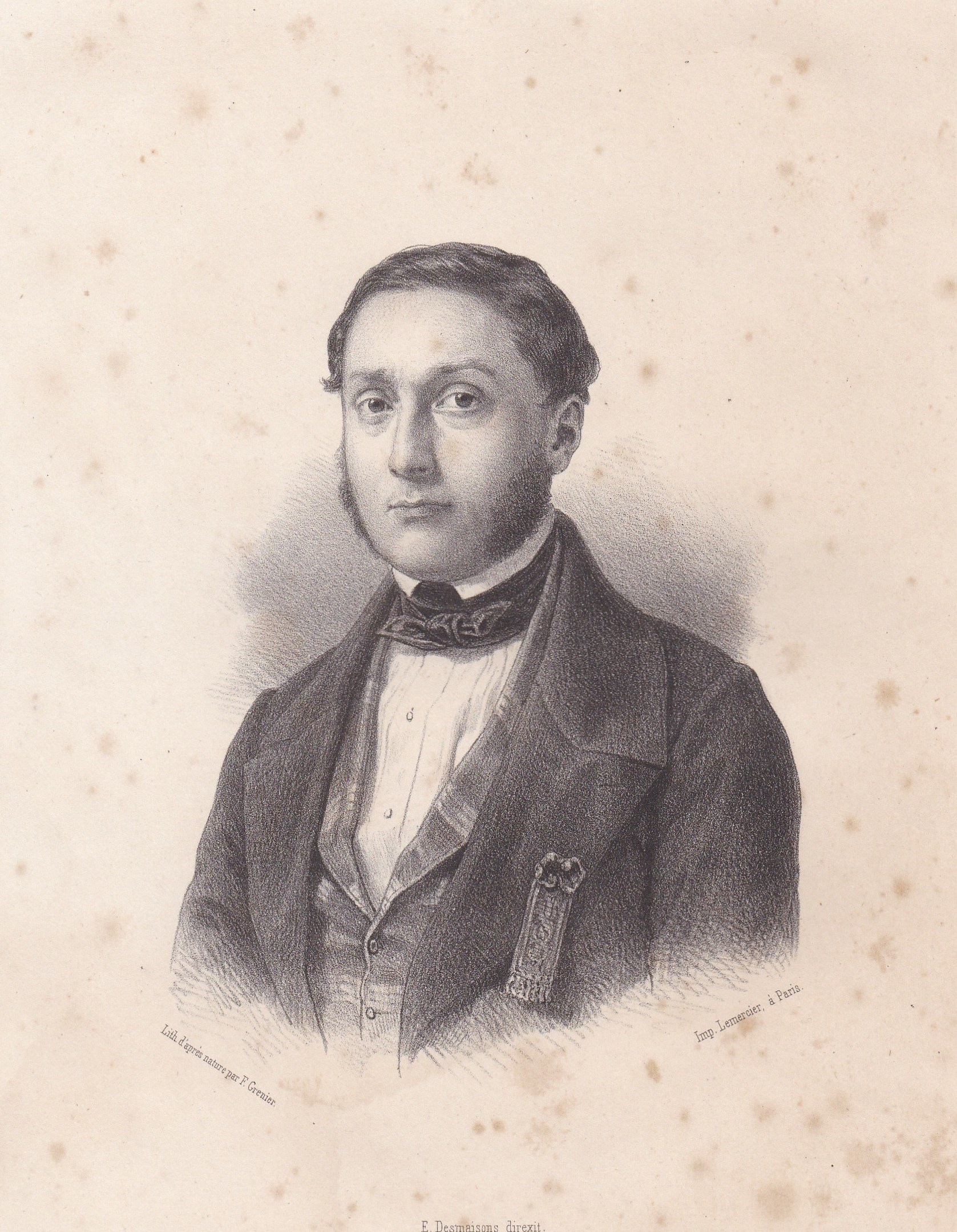
- Born: Louis, Etienne, Alphonse Jobez; 1 August 1813; Morez, Jura, France
- Died: 13 May 1893 (aged 79); Morez, Jura, France
- Occupation: Politician
- Parent: Jean-Emmanuel Jobez
- Relatives: Henri-Jean Jobez (nephew)

Alphonse Jobez (1 August 1813 - 13 May 1893) was a French businessman and politician. He was the manager of the Forges de Syam. He represented Jura in the National Constituent Assembly in 1848-1849 during the Second French Republic. He was the author of several books of political economy.
