= Champagnole =

Commune in Bourgogne-Franche-Comté, France

Champagnole Tsanpagnola (Arpitan)
- Commune
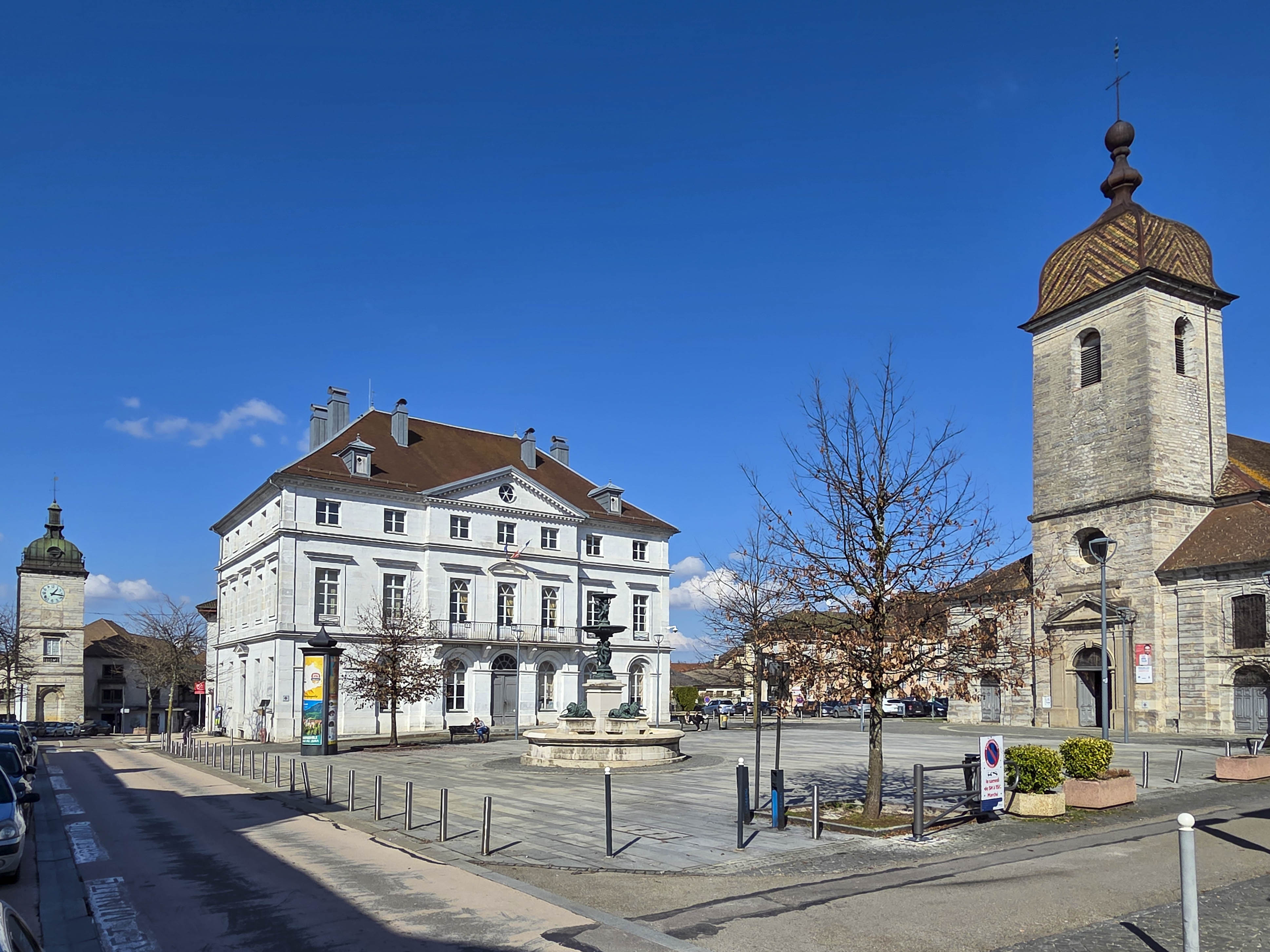
- Champagnole town centre

- Coat of arms
- Location of Champagnole
- Location within France Location within Bourgogne-Franche-Comté
- Coordinates: 46°44′53″N 5°54′28″E
- Country: France
- Region: Bourgogne-Franche-Comté
- Department: Jura
- Arrondissement: Lons-le-Saunier
- Canton: Champagnole

Government
  - Mayor (2020–2026): Guy Saillard
- Area^{1}: 20.18 km^{2} (7.79 sq mi)
- Elevation: 545 m (1,788 ft)
- Highest elevation: 783 m (2,569 ft)
- Lowest elevation: 476 m (1,562 ft)
- Population (2023): 8,036
  - Density: 398.2/km^{2} (1,031/sq mi)
- Time zone: UTC+01:00 (CET)
  - Summer (DST): UTC+02:00 (CEST)
- INSEE/Postal code: 39097 /39300
- ^{1} French Land Register data, which excludes lakes, ponds, glaciers > 1 km^{2} (0.386 sq mi or 247 acres) and river estuaries.

Champagnole (French pronunciation: [ʃɑ̃paɲɔl]; Arpitan: Tsanpagnola) is a commune in the Jura department in Bourgogne-Franche-Comté in eastern France.

== Geography ==
Champagnole has the publicity tag of "Pearl of the Jura" and is a small town at the geographical centre of Jura tourism. It stands on the right bank of the young river Ain at the foot of Mont Rivel (800m). It is around 130 km north east of Lyon, around 90 km south east of Dijon, and around 60 km north of Geneva.

== Population ==
Historical population

Year	Pop.	±% p.a.
1793	1,472	—
1800	1,548	+0.72%
1806	1,764	+2.20%
1821	2,439	+2.18%
1831	2,934	+1.86%
1836	3,146	+1.41%
1841	3,276	+0.81%
1846	3,303	+0.16%
1851	3,179	−0.76%
1856	2,967	−1.37%
1861	3,193	+1.48%
1866	3,366	+1.06%
1872	3,294	−0.36%
1876	3,418	+0.93%
1881	3,700	+1.60%
1886	3,744	+0.24%
1891	3,588	−0.85%
1896	3,676	+0.49%
1901	3,830	+0.82%

Year	Pop.	±% p.a.
1906	3,719	−0.59%
1911	3,785	+0.35%
1921	3,855	+0.18%
1926	4,423	+2.79%
1931	4,542	+0.53%
1936	4,726	+0.80%
1946	5,022	+0.61%
1954	5,862	+1.95%
1962	7,531	+3.18%
1968	9,273	+3.53%
1975	10,293	+1.50%
1982	9,713	−0.83%
1990	9,250	−0.61%
1999	8,616	−0.79%
2007	8,133	−0.72%
2012	7,938	−0.48%
2017	7,958	+0.05%
2023	8,036	+0.16%

Source: EHESS and INSEE (1968-2023)

== Economy ==
Champagnole’s economic activity is principally industrial. The town is surrounded by blocks of forest so the exploitation of the timber and of its derivatives supplies the raw materials for furniture factories, including bathroom furniture. There is also a craft trade in box-making, wooden utensils and toys.

The presence of the Ain is the source of other industries at Champagnole: mills, iron and steel working, including specialist steels and drawing wire to special sections. The Forges de Syam, which are classed as an historic monument, are a proud representative of this metalworking tradition. A less obvious connection with the river lies in the aluminium foundry-work done at Champagnole but a speciality in this field usually goes with a supply of relatively cheap, hydroelectricity, a product of the Ain since the early 20th century. There are also printing works, plastic injection moulding factories, micro-mechanical workshops and optical laboratories producing spectacles.

Its food specialities are charcuterie or pork butchery, represented by fumé du Jura (smoked Jura ham); Comté (a cow’s milk cheese) or goat cheese, other milk products and honey (from spruce and from flowers).

== History ==
The modern economy of the town is based on the economic assets of the region historically. Though it is normal to think of steel works in connection with extensive, flat sites and the proximity of coal, here iron-working began before the use of coal for the purpose was practical. The forest was needed to provide charcoal. The river in its steep bed provided power. There was plenty of limestone for smelting flux and some ferruginous limestone, though how useful that will have been as ore is not clear. (Compare Red Mountain, Birmingham, Alabama). Another consideration is the fact that Champagnole is so to speak, just over the hill from La Tène, the centre of late Iron Age culture. See La Tène culture.

== Administration ==
List of the successive mayors
mandate	Name
2001–2008	Jean Charoppin
2008–2015	Clément Pernot
2015–present	Guy Saillard

== Sights ==
- Gateway to the high Jura and to the land of the Jura lakes, Champagnole is a floral town featuring the "Parc de Belle Frise". The Ain passes below the lower edge of the park. On its bank are walks.
- In the same way, Champagnole is the gateway to the Route des Sapins (the Pine Road), which in forty kilometres, crosses the forests of the Frese, the Joux and of Levier, named after the commune where the route ends.
- The Forges de Syam form part both of the history of Champagnole's industry and of its present. There are signs that it may be set for the future too.

== Sports ==
Champagnole is a sporting town with all types of sports club including rugby, football, tennis, baseball, pétanque and handball.

Stage 19 of the 2020 Tour de France ended here, and was the start of Stage 7 of the 2024 Tour de France Femmes.

== Twin towns ==
- Gottmadingen, Germany, twinned since 1968 (Exchange between the Collège Les Louataux, Champagnole and the Eichendorff Realschule, Gottmadingen.)
- Dukinfield, England, twinned since 1958

== Climate ==
Climate data for Champagnole (1991–2020 normals, extremes 1998–present)
Month	Jan	Feb	Mar	Apr	May	Jun	Jul	Aug	Sep	Oct	Nov	Dec	Year
Record high °C (°F)	18.8 (65.8)	20.5 (68.9)	24.3 (75.7)	27.5 (81.5)	31.5 (88.7)	35.6 (96.1)	37.5 (99.5)	37.2 (99.0)	32.9 (91.2)	28.9 (84.0)	21.2 (70.2)	18.3 (64.9)	37.5 (99.5)
Mean daily maximum °C (°F)	5.9 (42.6)	7.1 (44.8)	11.3 (52.3)	14.9 (58.8)	18.8 (65.8)	22.6 (72.7)	24.8 (76.6)	24.7 (76.5)	20.3 (68.5)	16.1 (61.0)	10.0 (50.0)	6.4 (43.5)	15.2 (59.4)
Daily mean °C (°F)	1.4 (34.5)	1.9 (35.4)	5.4 (41.7)	8.5 (47.3)	12.5 (54.5)	16.0 (60.8)	18.0 (64.4)	17.7 (63.9)	13.9 (57.0)	10.2 (50.4)	5.2 (41.4)	2.1 (35.8)	9.4 (48.9)
Mean daily minimum °C (°F)	−3.1 (26.4)	−3.2 (26.2)	−0.5 (31.1)	2.0 (35.6)	6.1 (43.0)	9.4 (48.9)	11.2 (52.2)	10.8 (51.4)	7.4 (45.3)	4.4 (39.9)	0.4 (32.7)	−2.2 (28.0)	3.6 (38.5)
Record low °C (°F)	−21.1 (−6.0)	−23.0 (−9.4)	−22.8 (−9.0)	−9.8 (14.4)	−4.3 (24.3)	−1.4 (29.5)	2.0 (35.6)	1.4 (34.5)	−2.5 (27.5)	−8.5 (16.7)	−17.5 (0.5)	−23.5 (−10.3)	−23.5 (−10.3)
Average precipitation mm (inches)	136.4 (5.37)	116.4 (4.58)	122.7 (4.83)	113.2 (4.46)	137.3 (5.41)	118.2 (4.65)	116.8 (4.60)	120.9 (4.76)	119.6 (4.71)	145.2 (5.72)	158.6 (6.24)	167.9 (6.61)	1,573.2 (61.94)
Average precipitation days (≥ 1.0 mm)	12.8	11.5	11.5	11.7	13.9	10.7	11.3	10.4	9.8	12.7	12.9	14.4	143.6
Source: Meteociel

== See also ==
- Jura Mountains
- Communes of the Jura department
