= Sjam =

Sjam or SJAM may refer to:

- Kamaruzaman Sjam, key member of the Communist Party of Indonesia who was executed for his part in the 1965 coup attempt

== SJAM ==
- St. John Ambulance of Malaysia, a non-profit statutory body in Malaysia providing emergency medical services
- Sir John Alexander Macdonald (1815 – 1891), the first prime minister of Canada
- Sir John A Macdonald Junior High School, a Junior High School in Calgary, Alberta, Canada
- Sir John A. Macdonald Secondary School (Waterloo, Ontario), a high school in the Regional Municipality of Waterloo, Ontario, Canada

== See also ==
- Syam (disambiguation)
- Siam (disambiguation)
