= Siamese twins (disambiguation) =

Siamese twins or conjoined twins are identical twins whose bodies are conjoined in utero.

Siamese twins may also refer to:

- Chang and Eng Bunker the "Siamese Twins", Siamese-American conjoined twin brothers from whom the term derives
- Irreversible binomial, a pair or group of words used together in fixed order, such as fish and chips or null and void
- NGC 4567 and NGC 4568, two galaxies nicknamed the Siamese twins
- "Siamese Twins", a song from the Cure's 1982 album Pornography
- A type of crossword puzzle with two grids and two clues for each entry displayed together in random order

== See also ==
- Siamese (disambiguation)
- Siamese connection, a pipe fitting that allows two or more fire hoses to be connected
- Dual-listed company, a corporate structure in which two corporations function as a single operating business
