= Henri-Jean Jobez =

French politician (1865–1931)

- Born: 26 June 1865; Saint-Nizier, Haute-Saône France
- Died: 28 May 1931; Paris, France
- Occupation: Politician
- Relatives: Jean-Emmanuel Jobez (great-uncle); Alphonse Jobez (uncle)

Henri-Jean Jobez (26 June 1865 - 28 May 1931) was a French politician. He served as a member of the Chamber of Deputies in 1897–1898, representing Jura.
