= Château de Syam =

Château in Syam, Jura, France

Coordinates: 46°42′17″N 5°56′43″E

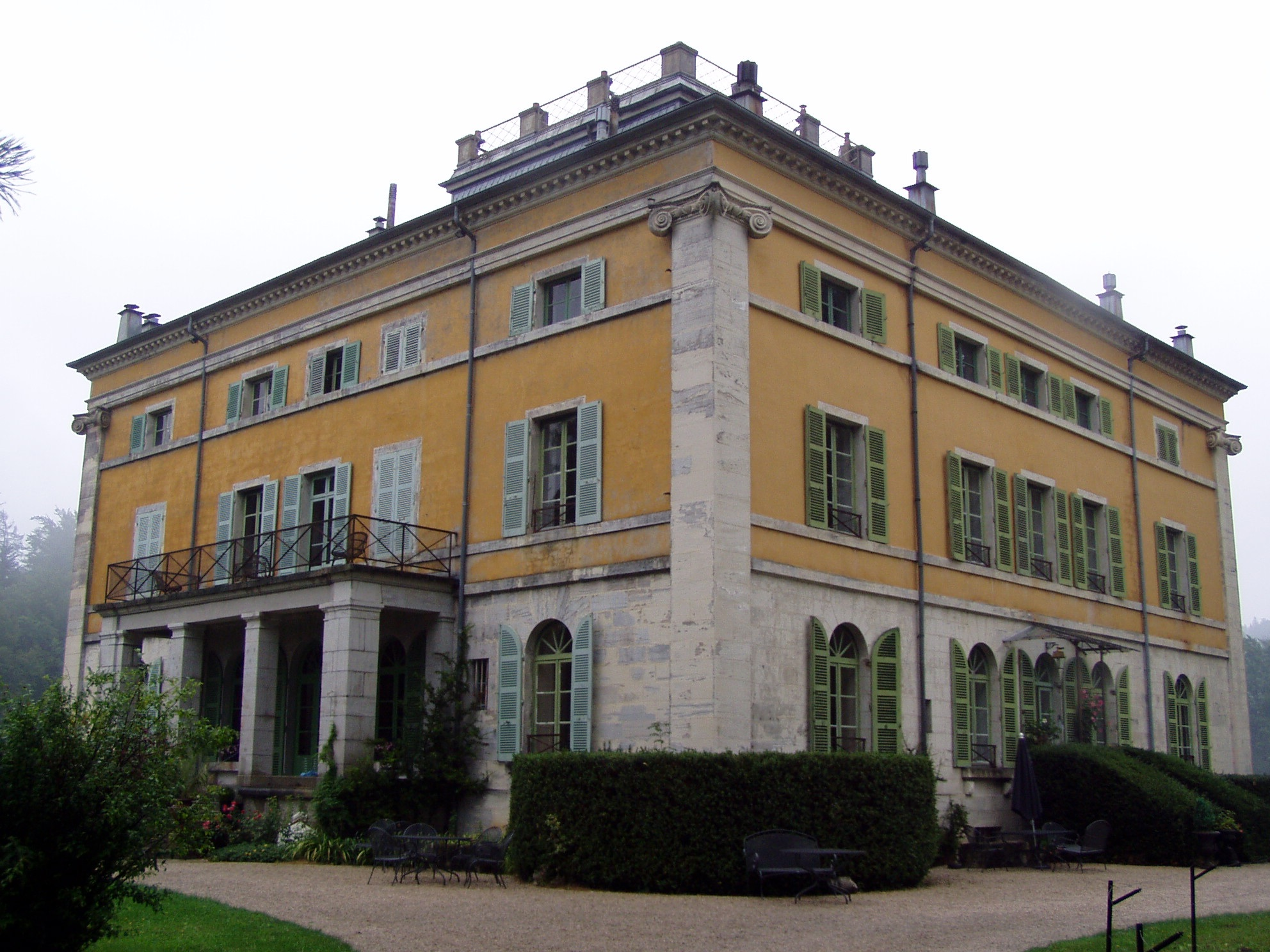
Château de Syam

The Château de Syam, located in the village of Syam in the French department of Jura, was built in 1818 by Jean-Emmanuel Jobez regional industrialist and owner of the Forges de Syam, a forge and sheet metal works.

The castle was listed as a Monument historique by the French Ministry of Culture in 1994.

== Inspiration ==
Emmanuel Jobez lived in Paris for ten years where he met Pierre-Adrien Pâris, court architect to Louis XVI and also a native of Jura. Both men embraced Neoclassical architecture and together toured Italy where they visited works designed by Andrea Palladio. They returned impressed by classical architecture and its association with Enlightenment philosophy.

== Design ==
Emmanuel Jobez returned to Syam where he engaged the architect Champennois L'Aîne to build a château largely inspired by Palladio's Villa La Rotonda. Completed c. 1828, the square building is situated on a north–south, east–west axis and organized around a central three-story rotunda. The ground floor of the rotunda is used as a theater and concert hall. Decoration of the house includes polychrome painting, trompe-l'œil murals in the eye of the dome, original wallpapers produced by Xavier Mader for the manufacturer Joseph Dufour et Cie, candelabra and chandeliers by Pierre-Philippe Thomire, and original Empire and Restauration period furniture. The château remained in ownership of Jobez descendants until 2001 when the property was acquired by Brigitte Cannard and Claude Darbon who occupy a portion of the house and offer tours and concerts there.
