= Seyam =

Seyam is a surname.

Notable people with the surname include:

- Reda Seyam (born 1959 or 1960), German-Egyptian Islamic militant and official in the Islamic State
- Said Seyam (1959–2009), interior minister of the Palestinian government of March 2006
- Tamer Seyam (born 1992), Palestinian international footballer
