= Siam (disambiguation) =

Siam is the former name of Thailand, and is used to refer to the historical region of Central Thailand, usually including Southern Thailand.

Siam or SIAM may also refer to:

== Places ==
- Siam, Iowa, an unincorporated community in the United States
- Siam, Ohio, an unincorporated community in the United States
- Siam area, area in the Pathum Wan district of Bangkok, Thailand
  - Siam BTS Station, rail station which serves this area
- Rue de Siam or Siam Street, a street in Brest, France

=== Historical kingdoms ===
- Sukhothai Kingdom (1238–1438), a kingdom in what is now north central Thailand that eventually merged with Ayutthaya
- Ayutthaya Kingdom (1350–1767), a Siamese kingdom centered on the city of Ayutthaya
- Thonburi Kingdom (1767–1782), a kingdom with its capital in Thonburi, which is now part of Bangkok
- Rattanakosin Kingdom (1782–1932), a kingdom in Thailand until the Siamese revolution
- Xiān (暹), group of ancient political entities in Thailand

== SIAM ==
- Salón Internacional del Automóvil México, an annual auto show in Mexico City
- Service integration and management, an information technology management framework
- Society for Industrial and Applied Mathematics, an academic society

== Other uses ==
- Siam (name), a surname and given name, including notable people with the name
- Siam (duo), a Colombian musical duo
  - Siam (album), their debut album

== See also ==
- Siamese (disambiguation)
- Sjam (disambiguation)
- Syam (disambiguation)
- History of Thailand
