= Syam, Jura =

Syam
- Commune
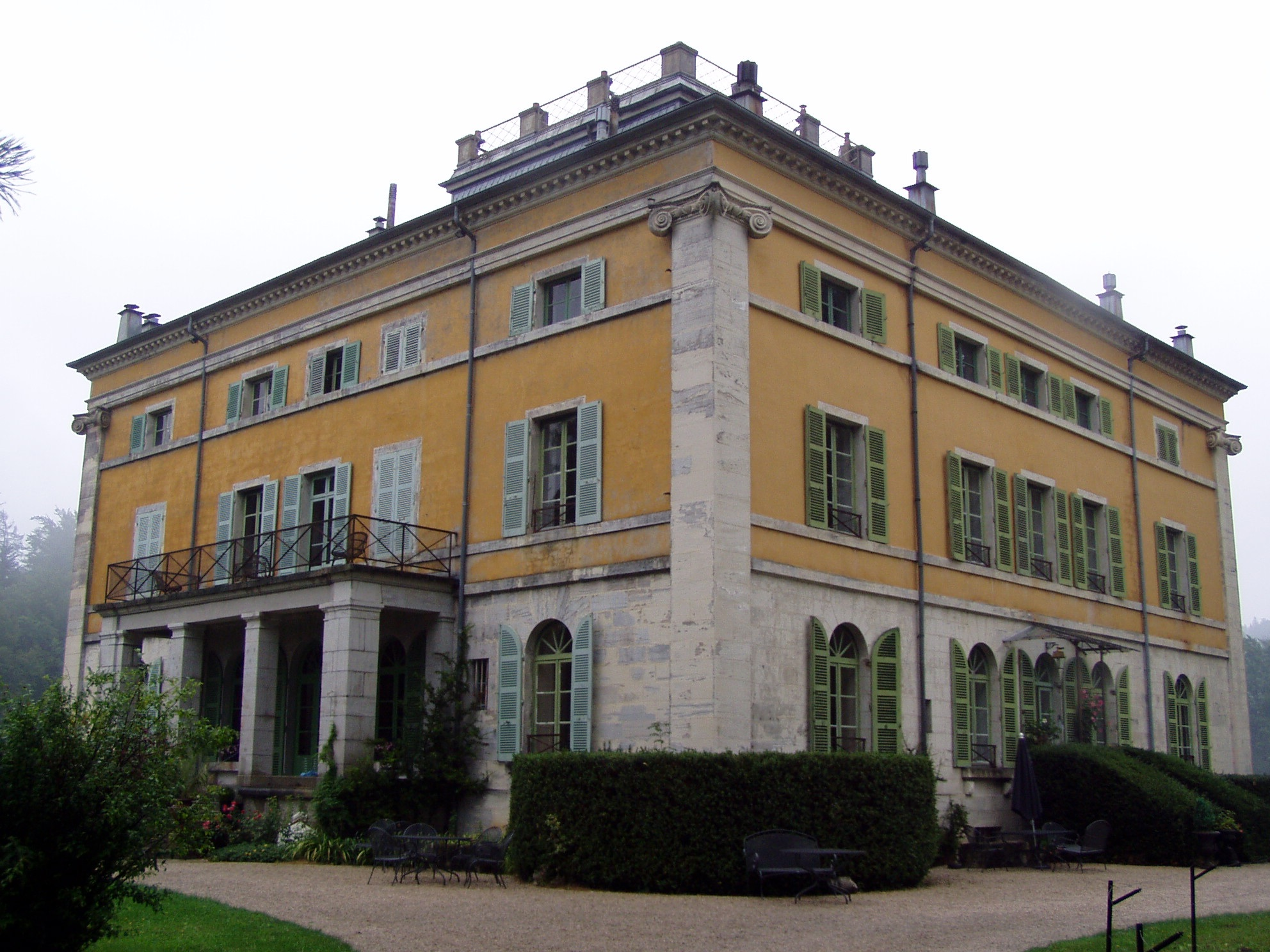
- Château de Syam
- Location of Syam
- Location within France Location within Bourgogne-Franche-Comté
- Coordinates: 46°42′03″N 5°57′00″E
- Country: France
- Region: Bourgogne-Franche-Comté
- Department: Jura
- Arrondissement: Lons-le-Saunier
- Canton: Champagnole

Government
  - Mayor (2020–2026): Hervé Gobet
- Area^{1}: 6.90 km^{2} (2.66 sq mi)
- Highest elevation: 794 m (2,605 ft)
- Lowest elevation: 521 m (1,709 ft)
- Population (2023): 184
  - Density: 26.7/km^{2} (69.1/sq mi)
- Time zone: UTC+01:00 (CET)
  - Summer (DST): UTC+02:00 (CEST)
- INSEE/Postal code: 39523 /39300
- ^{1} French Land Register data, which excludes lakes, ponds, glaciers > 1 km^{2} (0.386 sq mi or 247 acres) and river estuaries.

Syam (French pronunciation: [sjam]; Arpitan: Chan) is a commune in the Jura department in the Bourgogne-Franche-Comté region in eastern France.

The village is known for the Château de Syam, a large French Empire villa designed by Champennois l'Aîné in 1818.

== Population ==
Historical population
| Year | Pop. | ±% p.a. |
|---|---|---|
| 1968 | 243 | — |
| 1975 | 232 | −0.66% |
| 1982 | 226 | −0.37% |
| 1990 | 234 | +0.44% |
| 1999 | 221 | −0.63% |
| 2007 | 209 | −0.70% |
| 2012 | 196 | −1.28% |
| 2017 | 189 | −0.72% |
| 2023 | 184 | −0.45% |
Source: INSEE

== See also ==
- Communes of the Jura department
