= Strachey method for magic squares =

The Strachey method for magic squares is an algorithm for generating magic squares of singly even order 4k + 2. An example of magic square of order 6 constructed with the Strachey method:

Example
35	1	6	26	19	24
3	32	7	21	23	25
31	9	2	22	27	20
8	28	33	17	10	15
30	5	34	12	14	16
4	36	29	13	18	11

Strachey's method of construction of singly even magic square of order n = 4k + 2.

1. Divide the grid into 4 quarters each having n^{2}/4 cells and name them crosswise thus

A	C
D	B

2. Using the Siamese method (De la Loubère method) complete the individual magic squares of odd order 2k + 1 in subsquares A, B, C, D, first filling up the sub-square A with the numbers 1 to n^{2}/4, then the sub-square B with the numbers n^{2}/4 + 1 to 2n^{2}/4, then the sub-square C with the numbers 2n^{2}/4 + 1 to 3n^{2}/4, then the sub-square D with the numbers 3n^{2}/4 + 1 to n^{2}. As a running example, we consider a 10×10 magic square, where we have divided the square into four quarters. The quarter A contains a magic square of numbers from 1 to 25, B a magic square of numbers from 26 to 50, C a magic square of numbers from 51 to 75, and D a magic square of numbers from 76 to 100.

17	24	1	8	15	67	74	51	58	65
23	5	7	14	16	73	55	57	64	66
4	6	13	20	22	54	56	63	70	72
10	12	19	21	3	60	62	69	71	53
11	18	25	2	9	61	68	75	52	59
92	99	76	83	90	42	49	26	33	40
98	80	82	89	91	48	30	32	39	41
79	81	88	95	97	29	31	38	45	47
85	87	94	96	78	35	37	44	46	28
86	93	100	77	84	36	43	50	27	34

3. Exchange the leftmost k columns in sub-square A with the corresponding columns of sub-square D.

92	99	1	8	15	67	74	51	58	65
98	80	7	14	16	73	55	57	64	66
79	81	13	20	22	54	56	63	70	72
85	87	19	21	3	60	62	69	71	53
86	93	25	2	9	61	68	75	52	59
17	24	76	83	90	42	49	26	33	40
23	5	82	89	91	48	30	32	39	41
4	6	88	95	97	29	31	38	45	47
10	12	94	96	78	35	37	44	46	28
11	18	100	77	84	36	43	50	27	34

4. Exchange the rightmost k - 1 columns in sub-square C with the corresponding columns of sub-square B.

92	99	1	8	15	67	74	51	58	40
98	80	7	14	16	73	55	57	64	41
79	81	13	20	22	54	56	63	70	47
85	87	19	21	3	60	62	69	71	28
86	93	25	2	9	61	68	75	52	34
17	24	76	83	90	42	49	26	33	65
23	5	82	89	91	48	30	32	39	66
4	6	88	95	97	29	31	38	45	72
10	12	94	96	78	35	37	44	46	53
11	18	100	77	84	36	43	50	27	59

5. Exchange the middle cell of the leftmost column of sub-square A with the corresponding cell of sub-square D. Exchange the central cell in sub-square A with the corresponding cell of sub-square D.

92	99	1	8	15	67	74	51	58	40
98	80	7	14	16	73	55	57	64	41
4	81	88	20	22	54	56	63	70	47
85	87	19	21	3	60	62	69	71	28
86	93	25	2	9	61	68	75	52	34
17	24	76	83	90	42	49	26	33	65
23	5	82	89	91	48	30	32	39	66
79	6	13	95	97	29	31	38	45	72
10	12	94	96	78	35	37	44	46	53
11	18	100	77	84	36	43	50	27	59

The result is a magic square of order n=4k + 2.

== See also ==
- Conway's LUX method for magic squares
- Siamese method
