= Conway's LUX method for magic squares =

Algorithm for creating magic squares

Conway's LUX method for magic squares is an algorithm by John Horton Conway for creating magic squares of order 4n+2, where n is a natural number.

== Method ==
Start by creating a (2n+1)-by-(2n+1) square array consisting of

- n+1 rows of Ls,
- 1 row of Us, and
- n-1 rows of Xs,

and then exchange the U in the middle with the L above it.

Each letter represents a 2x2 block of numbers in the finished square.

Now replace each letter by four consecutive numbers, starting with 1, 2, 3, 4 in the centre square of the top row, and moving from block to block in the manner of the Siamese method: move up and right, wrapping around the edges, and move down whenever you are obstructed. Fill each 2x2 block according to the order prescribed by the letter:

$$\mathrm{L}: \quad \begin{smallmatrix}4&&1\\&\swarrow&\\2&\rightarrow&3\end{smallmatrix} \qquad \mathrm{U}: \quad \begin{smallmatrix}1&&4\\\downarrow&&\uparrow\\2&\rightarrow&3\end{smallmatrix} \qquad \mathrm{X}:\quad \begin{smallmatrix}1&&4\\&\searrow\!\!\!\!\!\!\nearrow&\\3&&2\end{smallmatrix}$$

== Example ==
Let n = 2, so that the array is 5x5 and the final square is 10x10.

L	L	L	L	L
L	L	L	L	L
L	L	U	L	L
U	U	L	U	U
X	X	X	X	X

Start with the L in the middle of the top row, move to the 4th X in the bottom row, then to the U at the end of the 4th row, then the L at the beginning of the 3rd row, etc.

68	65	96	93	4	1	32	29	60	57
66	67	94	95	2	3	30	31	58	59
92	89	20	17	28	25	56	53	64	61
90	91	18	19	26	27	54	55	62	63
16	13	24	21	49	52	80	77	88	85
14	15	22	23	50	51	78	79	86	87
37	40	45	48	76	73	81	84	9	12
38	39	46	47	74	75	82	83	10	11
41	44	69	72	97	100	5	8	33	36
43	42	71	70	99	98	7	6	35	34

== See also ==
- Siamese method
- Strachey method for magic squares
