= Jean-Emmanuel Jobez =

French businessman and politician

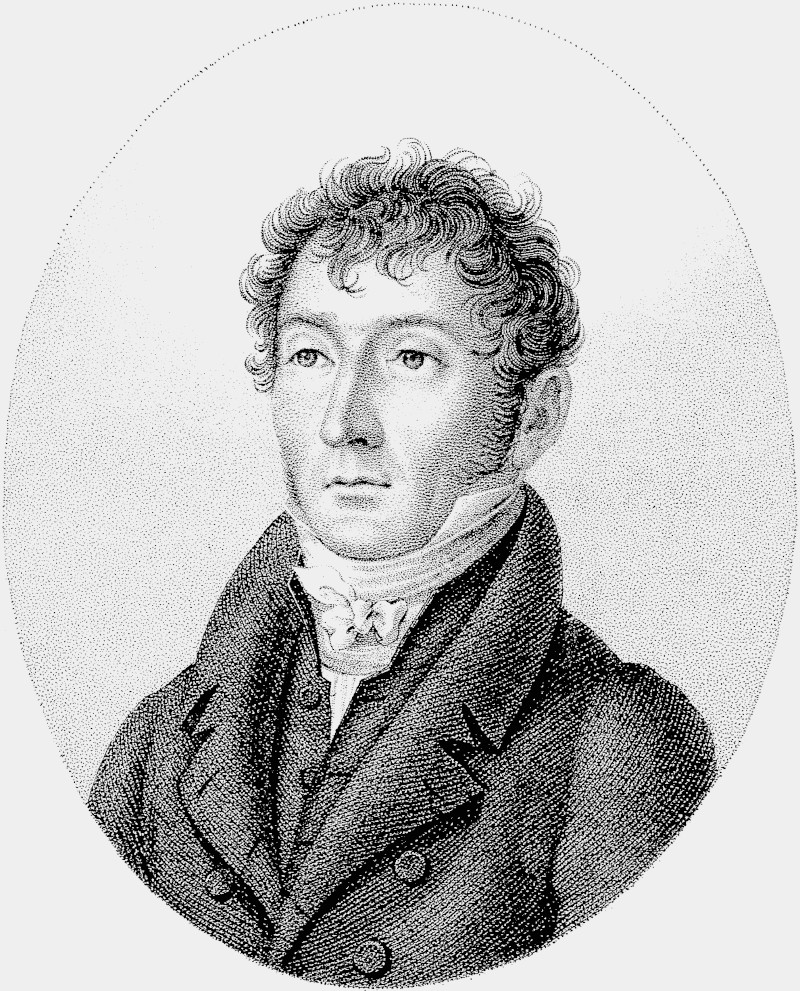
- Born: 2 November 1775; Morez, Jura, France
- Died: 9 October 1828 (aged 52); Lons-le-Saulnier, Jura, France
- Occupations: Businessman, politician
- Children: Alphonse Jobez
- Parent: Claude Jobez

Jean-Emmanuel Jobez (November 2, 1775 - October 9, 1828) was a French businessman and politician. He was the owner of the Forges de Syam. He was the mayor of Morez, and he represented Jura in the Chamber of Representatives during the Hundred Days in 1815, followed by the Chamber of Deputies during the Second Restoration in 1815–1823, and again in 1828.
