= Forges de Syam =

Coordinates: 46.7057°N 5.9424°E

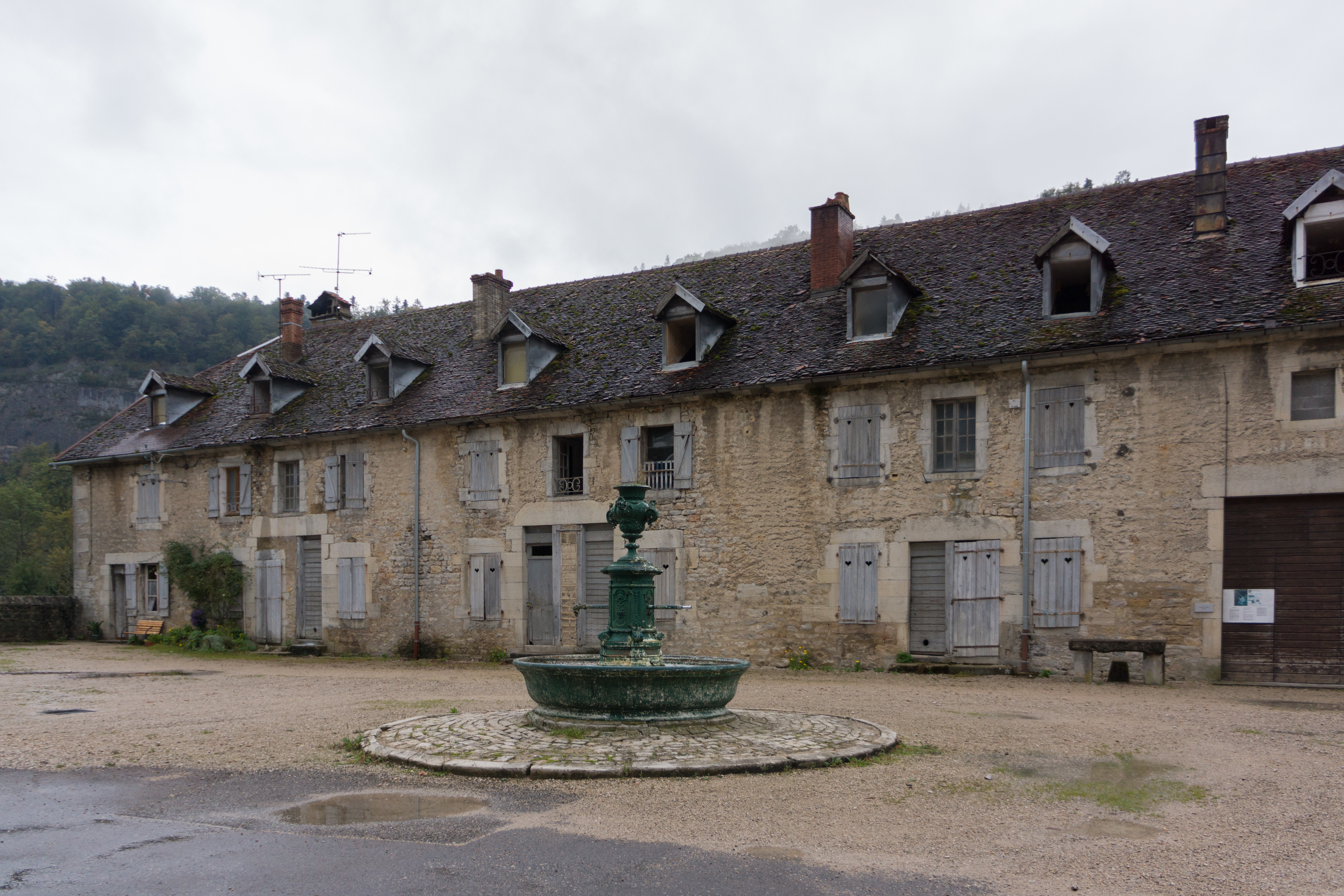
The main building.

The Forges de Syam (Syam Forges) are forge works and sheet metal mills at the confluence of the rivers Ain and Saine to the south of Champagnole in the French département of Jura.

The documentary film Syam ou le temps forgé, filmed on location in 2016, examines the closure of the site after 200 years of operation. It was inspired by the book Les forges de Syam by Pierre Bergounioux.

== History of the site ==
The forges were still active in 2005, and still used some machinery from the 19th century, when the buildings were erected. A tilt hammer mentioned in 1757 and 1788 has been working as early as 1763, according to the record of a law case of 1763. It is reasonable to imagine it as part of the region's expansion in the metal-working industry in the 16th century, after the establishment of the first smelting furnaces in the Saône valley.

The basic business was making scythes. These had a good reputation, and the making of them was a finely honed skill. In the 18th century, only a few forges had mastered the technique of using a mechanical hammer. So much was this a problem that French producers couldn't keep up with the demand for scythes. They were imported, particularly from Styria, in the south-east of modern Austria, beyond the Tyrol. It was possible to develop this very skilled craft in the Jura owing to the expertise of immigrant workers from the Tyrol (just beyond the far end of Switzerland).

In conjunction with this skill, extensive woodland on the Jura Mountains around the town provided the raw material for charcoal, a form of carbon free of sulphur and other impurities that make most coal unsuitable for iron working. Extensive woodland was an asset, as it takes many trees to make a relatively small amount of iron goods. In 1763, the owners, the Péry family, produced more than 15,000 scythes and more than 60,000 iron tires for the wheels of vehicles.

=== Nineteenth century ===
After the French Revolution, the production of good-quality scythes provided an important opportunity for investment. Other industrialists of the Jura Mountains, of the Vosges and Alsace began production, contributing to Charles-Joseph Péry declaring himself bankrupt on 24 July 1810.

The unit was bought the same year by Claude Jobez (1745–1830), of Morez. He had already made a fortune from selling clocks from the Franche-Comté region in Paris, and from financing several iron workshops. Also in 1810, Etienne Monnier who had married Adélaïde, the daughter of Claude Jobez in 1800, invested in the company alongside his father-in-law and the latter's son, Emmanuel. Between 1811 and 1820, they built a new factory downstream from the primitive tilt hammer. This included a novelty for France at the time, a reverberatory furnace. From 1820, these works produced 400 tons of goods each year, which doubled by 1840.

Competition from coke-smelted cast iron from the United Kingdom—which was cheaper than charcoal-produced iron goods at Syam—hurt the business. Alphonse Jobez, the son of Emmanuel, set up a nail works in 1864, which gave new life to an enterprise that had neared collapse. The workforce increased from 40 to 70.

==== Social and domestic life ====
In 1825, Emmanuel Jobez developed the project of building a Palladian villa, the Château de Syam to replace the old house beside the original forge. He didn't see its completion, having died by accident in 1828. Alphonse, his son, took up the cause of the Fourierist theory. He applied it at Syam by creating a cité ouvrière (compare Saltaire), adjoining the factory, encouraging the setting up of a school and a dispensary. He added a post office with telegraph in 1885.

In parallel to this, he introduced exotic livestock to the estate farm and other lands he owned. A cultivated man, Alphonse also fitted out a library of 30,000 volumes on the first floor (American second floor) of the villa. Alphonse's granddaughter, who had married the son of Sadi-Carnot in 1910, would often stay at Syam.

=== Twentieth century ===
The nail works closed in 1914. Syam limited its range of products, specializing in those where there was limited competition. This enabled it to survive the two World Wars.

In 1945, the firm of UMAS, from Arc-et-Senans, a specialist in making files, became the main stakeholder in Syam. The group went bankrupt in 1976. From 1969, a workforce would come from Morocco, from the village of El Hajjyenne.

In 1976, the forges were sold to Experton-Revollier, a group from Isère. Modernization was necessary, as there was no travelling crane or electric motor-driven machinery (instead of belt transmission). Improvements went hand in hand with the retention of the steel rolling mill, the last of its type in France and one of the last in Europe.

== Present-day activity ==
Today, this remnant of the iron industry of the 19th century feeds the market in short-run products, particularly in the fields of locksmiths' work, motor cars and lifts (elevators).

== See also ==
- Lac de Vouglans Hydro-electricity
