= Tai =

Tai, tai, or TAI may refer to:

== Arts and entertainment ==
- Tai (comics) a Marvel Comics supervillain
- Tai Fraiser, a fictional character in the 1995 film Clueless
- Tai Kamiya, a fictional character in Digimon
- Tai, a fictional character in Moon Girl and Devil Dinosaur
- Tai Lung, a villain in the 2008 film Kung Fu Panda

== Businesses ==
- Avianca El Salvador, an airline, ICAO code TAI
- Transports Aériens Intercontinentaux (TAI), a defunct French airline
- Turkish Aerospace Industries (TAI)

== Ethnic groups and languages ==
- Tai peoples, South China and mainland Southeast Asia
- Tai languages, South China and mainland Southeast Asia
- Tai language (New Guinea)
- Tee language, or Tai, Nigeria

== People ==
- Tai (given name), including a list of people with the name
- Tai (surname), including a list of people with the name
- Dai (surname), a Chinese surname also spelled Tai, including a list of people with the name
- Tai, the artist name of poet and painter Kambara Yasushi (1899–1997)

== Places ==
- Tai (city), a former settlement in China during the Xia dynasty
- Tai, Ardabil, Iran
- Tai, Lorestan, Iran
- Tai, Rivers, Nigeria
- Taï, Ivory Coast
- Lake Tai, in the Yangtze Delta, China
- Mount Tai, in Shandong, China
- Taiz International Airport, Yemen, IATA airport code TAI

== Other uses ==
- Tai (elephant) (1968–2021), an Asian elephant that had appeared in several films
- International Atomic Time (TAI, from its French name temps atomique international)
- Red seabream (Pagrus major), known in Japan as Tai, a fish
- Trifluoromethylaminoindane (TAI), a psychoactive drug
- Tai or Thai, a month in the Tamil calendar

== See also ==
- Dai (disambiguation) (Chinese Tai is sometimes romanized as Dai)
- Tay (disambiguation)
- Thai (disambiguation)
- Taiwan, a state in East Asia
- Ta'i (disambiguation)
- 太 (disambiguation)
- 泰 (disambiguation)
