= 泰 =

泰, meaning 'peaceful', may refer to:

- Tai, a simplified name for Mount Tai, in Shandong, China
- Tai (surname)#Japanese, a Japanese surname
- Yasushi, a masculine Japanese given name

== See also ==
- Names of Thailand
- Tai (disambiguation)
