= Ta'i =

Ta'i may refer to:

- Tayy (patronymic aṭ-Ṭāʾī), an Arab tribe
- Morgh Mohsen-e Tai, or Tā’ī, a village in Iran

== See also ==
- Tai (disambiguation)
