= Wudao Jiangjun =

Wudao Jiangjun (simplified Chinese: 五道将军; traditional Chinese: 五道將軍; pinyin: Wǔdào Jiāngjūn; lit. 'General of the Five Paths'), also called Wudao Laoye (五道老爺) or Wudao Dashen (五道大神), is an underworld god in Chinese folk religion and Taoism. He serves Dongyue Dadi and is believed to control people's life and death. He also appears in Chinese Buddhist texts and stories about the underworld. Despite his name, Wudao Jiangjun is usually one god, not five separate generals.

== Origins and beliefs ==
The Five Paths (五道) are the five places where a person may be reborn in Buddhist teachings. They are the realms of gods, humans, animals, hungry ghosts, and hell. Some Buddhist texts name a sixth realm for the asuras. Wudao Dashen was believed to oversee rebirth in the Five Paths.

The god appears in early Chinese Buddhist texts. Frederick Shih-Chung Chen studied these records and found that Wudao Dashen appears in some Chinese versions of the Buddha's life story but not in the Indian versions. He also found that early accounts of the god were linked to Buddhism. The god later became part of Chinese folk religion and Daoist beliefs.

In Daoist and folk beliefs, Wudao Jiangjun is a general serving Dongyue Dadi, the god of Mount Tai. He looks after the records of the living and the dead. He is also said to have power over people's lifespans and fortunes. Some accounts give him duties similar to those of the judges serving Yama.

Another tradition calls him Wudao Jiangjun (五盜將軍, "General of the Five Thieves"). In this version, there are five thieves who continued causing trouble after their deaths. Sanjiao Yuanliu Soushen Daquan (三教源流搜神大全) says that they were killed by a general named Zhang Hong (張洪) during the Liu Song dynasty. People later made offerings to them because they feared being robbed.

== In literature ==
Wudao Jiangjun appears in the Dunhuang story Han Qinhu Huaben (韓擒虎話本). In the story, the general Han Qinhu is visited by a god wearing golden armor. The god tells him that he has been chosen to become the ruler of the underworld. Han asks for three days before leaving the human world, but Wudao Jiangjun first refuses. After Han becomes angry, the god agrees to give him more time.

The story gives the following exchange:

神人答曰：「某緣（原）是五道將軍。」「何來？」「夜來三更奉天苻（符）牒下，將軍合作陰司之主。」
Translation: "The god answered, 'I am the General of the Five Paths.' 'Why have you come?' 'Last night, I received an order from heaven. You are to become the ruler of the underworld.'"

Wudao Jiangjun also appears in Stories to Awaken the World (醒世恆言), in the story The Affectionate Zhou Shengxian at Fanlou (鬧樊樓多情周勝仙). After Zhou Shengxian dies, her spirit comes under his control. He allows her to visit her lover, Fan Erlang, for three nights. He later helps Fan Erlang avoid punishment for her death. Fan Erlang continues to make offerings at Wudao Jiangjun's temple.

In Water Margin, Chapter 15, the outlaw Ruan Xiaoqi is compared to Wudao Jiangjun and Yama because of his fierce appearance. The name Wudao also appears in Gujin Xiaoshuo (古今小說), in the story Shi Hongzhao and the Meeting of Dragon and Tiger (史弘肇龍虎君臣會).

== Worship ==
Wudao Jiangjun was worshipped in temples called Wudao Miao (五道廟). These temples were once common in northern China. People prayed to him for safety, health, and protection from harm. When someone died, relatives also visited his temple to burn paper offerings and report the death to the god.

In Pinggu District, Beijing, there were once more than 400 Wudao temples, according to a local account. At Xiong'erzhai Village (熊兒寨村), a temple stood near the Yaowang Temple (藥王廟). The temple had paintings of Wudao Jiangjun and several other gods. Local villagers said that it was demolished around the late 1940s or early 1950s.

Another Wudao Temple stands near Hufangqiao (虎坊橋) in Xicheng District, Beijing. It was built during the Ming dynasty at a place where five streets meet. The temple had a hall for Wudao Jiangjun and another building for the Jade Emperor. It was repaired several times during the Qing dynasty. Parts of the old buildings and stone tablets still survive.

Wudao Jiangjun also appears in Chinese religious prints. The National Museum of History in Taiwan holds a late Qing dynasty woodblock print called Wudao Jiangjun (五道將軍). It shows one general wearing armor and a helmet. He holds a sword in his right hand and rests his left hand on his waist. The words "God of the Five Paths of This Place" (本境五道之神) appear above him.
