= Yasushi =

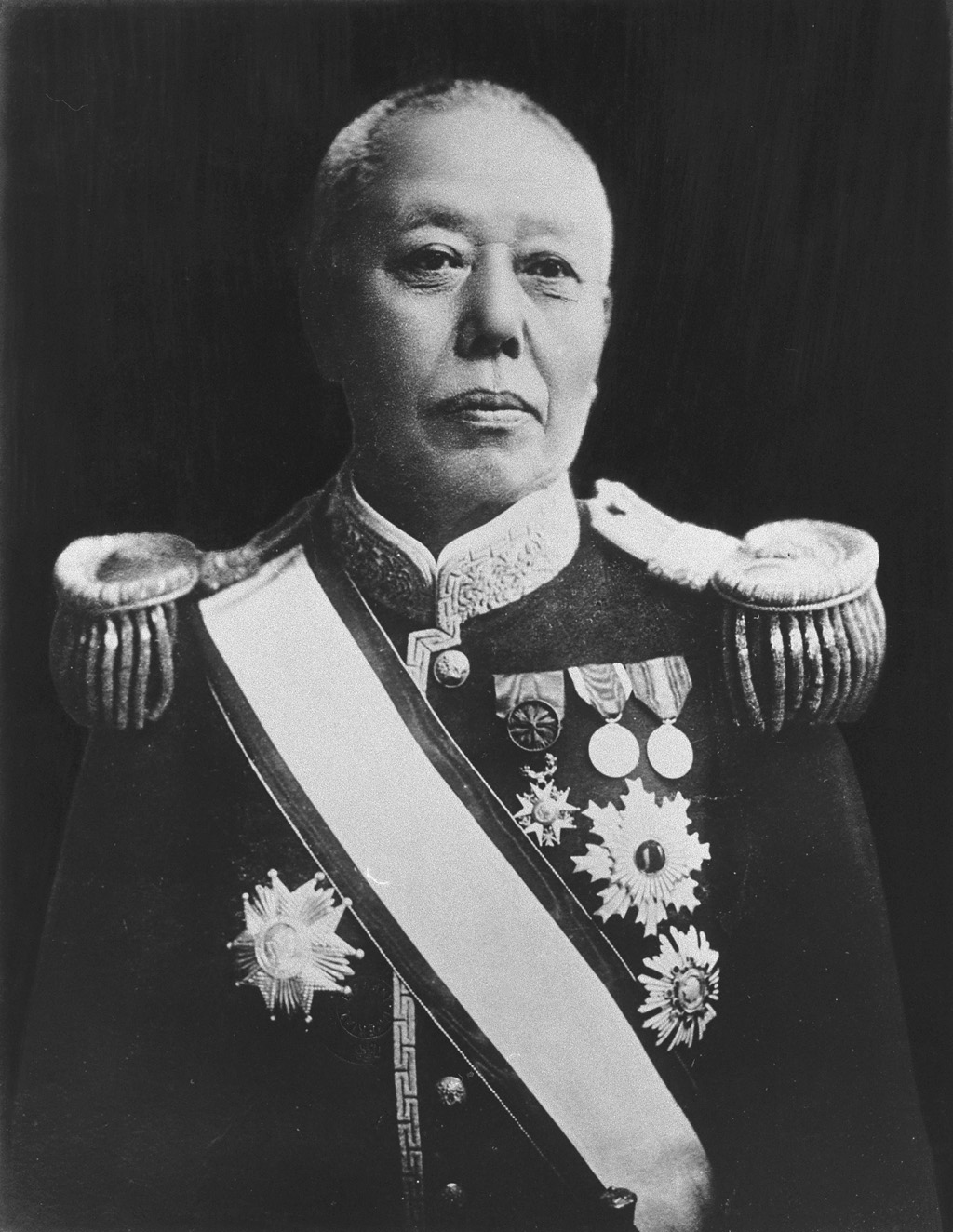
- Yasushi Nomura (1842–1909), Japanese politician
- Pronunciation: jasɯɕi (IPA)
- Gender: Male

Origin
- Origin: Japanese
- Meaning: Different meanings depending on the kanji used

Other names
- Alternative spelling: Yasusi (Kunrei-shiki) Yasusi (Nihon-shiki) Yasushi (Hepburn)

Yasushi is a masculine Japanese given name.

== Written forms ==
Yasushi can be written using many different combinations of kanji characters. Here are some examples:

- 康, "healthy"
- 靖, "peaceful"
- 泰, "peaceful"
- 安, "tranquil"
- 靖志, "peaceful, determination"
- 靖史, "peaceful, history"
- 靖士, "peaceful, knight"
- 靖司, "peaceful, administer"
- 康志, "healthy, determination"
- 康史, "healthy, history"
- 康士, "healthy, knight"
- 安志, "tranquil, determination"
- 安史, "tranquil, history"
- 安士, "tranquil, knight"
- 安司, "tranquil, administer"
- 保志, "preserve, determination"
- 保史, "preserve, history"
- 保士, "preserve, knight"
- 泰志, "peaceful, determination"
- 泰史, "peaceful, history"
- 易司, "divination, administer"
- 妥師, "peace, teacher"
- 也寸志, "to be, measurement, determination"

The name can also be written in hiragana やすし or katakana ヤスシ.

== Notable people with the name ==
- Yasushi Adachi (足立 康史), Japanese politician
- Yasushi Akashi (明石 康; born 1931), Japanese diplomat
- Yasushi Akimoto (秋元 康; born 1956), Japanese television writer, lyricist and academic
- Yasushi Akutagawa (芥川 也寸志; 1925–1989), Japanese composer and conductor
- Yasushi Asada (浅田 靖; born 1972), Japanese video game composer
- Yasushi Endo (遠藤 康; born 1988), Japanese footballer
- Yasushi Fukunaga (福永 泰; born 1973), Japanese footballer
- Yasushi Furukawa (governor) (古川 康; born 1958), Japanese politician
- Yasushi Furukawa (volleyball) (古川 靖志; born 1961), Japanese volleyball player
- Yasushi Hosaka (穂坂 泰; born 1974), Japanese politician
- Yasushi Iihara (飯原 誉士; born 1983), Japanese professional baseball player
- Yasushi Imamura (今村 安; 1890–????), Japanese equestrian
- Yasushi Inoue (井上 靖; 1907–1991), Japanese writer
- Yasushi Ishii (石井 妥師; born 1970), Japanese musician
- Yasushi Kamiuchi (神内 靖; born 1983), Japanese baseball player
- Yasushi Kanda (神田 裕之; born 1978), Japanese professional wrestler
- Yasushi Kaneko (金子 恭之; born 1961), Japanese politician
- Yasushi Kataoka (片岡 安; 1876–1946), Japanese architect
- Yasushi Katsume (勝目 康; born 1974), Japanese politician
- Yasushi Kawakami (川上 靖; born 1963), Japanese former football player, coach and manager
- Yasushi Kita (喜多 靖; born 1978), Japanese footballer
- Yasushi Kuroiwa (黒岩 康志; born 1965), Japanese speed skater
- Yasushi Matsumoto (松本 安司; born 1969), Japanese footballer
- Yasushi Matsushita (松下 泰士; born 1955), Japanese naval officer
- Yasushi Mieno (三重野 康; 1924–2012), Japanese businessman and banker
- Yasushi Miura (三浦 靖; born 1973), Japanese politician
- Yasushi Miyake (三宅 靖志; born 1974), Japanese wrestler
- Yasushi Murase (村瀬 康; born 1941), Japanese rower
- Yasushi Nagao (長尾 靖; 1930–2009), Japanese photographer
- Yasushi Nagata (永田 靖; 1907–1972), Japanese stage, film and television actor
- Yasushi Nawa (名和 靖; 1857–1926), Japanese entomologist
- Yasushi Niki (仁木 安; 1925–2016), Japanese professional baseball outfielder
- Yasushi Nirasawa (韮沢 靖; born 1963), Japanese illustrator and character designer
- Yasushi Nomura (野村 靖; 1842–1909), Japanese samurai and politician
- Yasushi Okada (小沢 靖; born 1968), Japanese molecular biologist and physician
- Yasushi Onokuni (大乃国 康; born 1962), Japanese sumo wrestler
- Yasushi Ozawa (小沢 靖; 1958–2008), Japanese musician
- Yasushi Sasaki (佐々木 康; 1908–1993), Japanese film director
- Yasushi Shikano (鹿野 寧; 1902–1994), Japanese photographer
- Yasushi Sugiyama (杉山 寧; 1909–1993), Japanese painter
- Yasushi Suzuki (鈴木 靖; born 1962), Japanese speed skater
- Yasushi Takahashi (高橋 康; born 1923), Japanese theoretical physicist
- Yasushi Tanaka (田中 保; 1886–1941), Japanese artist
- Yasushi Tao (田尾 安志; born 1954), Japanese baseball player
- Yasushi Tsujimoto (辻本 恭史; born 1982), Japanese professional wrestler
- Yasushi Ueta (植田 恭史; born 植田 恭史), Japanese track and field athlete
- Yasushi Warita (born 1971), Japanese mixed martial artist
- Yasushi Watanabe (渡辺 靖; born 1967), Japanese anthropologist
- Yasushi Yamaguchi (山口 恭史), Japanese video game designer and artist
- Yasushi Yoshida (吉田 靖; born 1960), Japanese footballer and manager

== Fictional characters ==
- Yasushi Takagi (高木 泰士), from manga Nana

== See also ==
- 6922 Yasushi, a main-belt asteroid
- 泰 (disambiguation)
