= Dai Temple =

Chinese temple in Shandong, China

- 岱庙
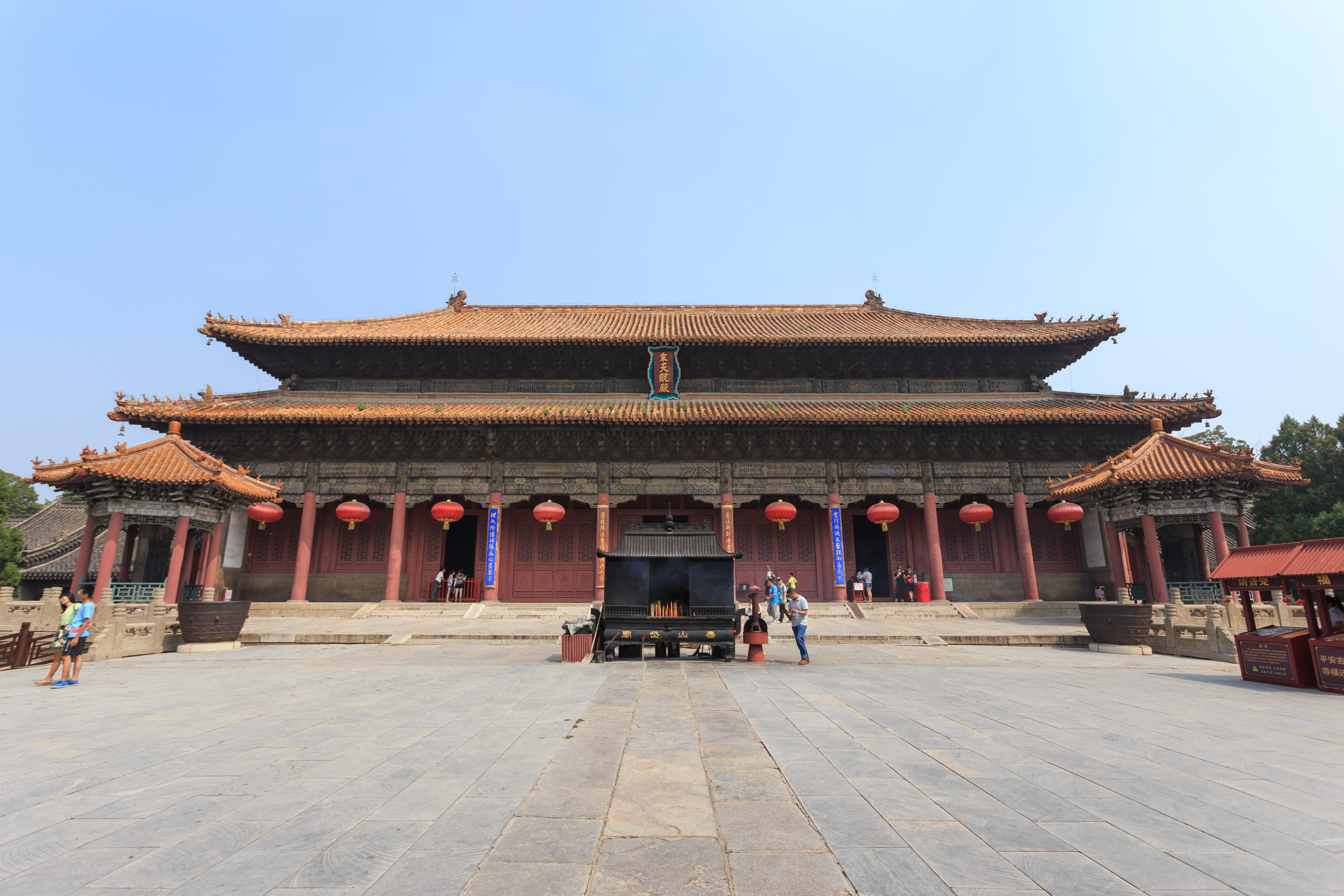
- The "Hall of Heavenly Blessings" (Chinese: 天贶殿; pinyin: Tiān kuàng diàn) of Dai Temple

- Location within China

Religion
- Affiliation: Daoism, Chinese folk religion
- Status: Museum

Location
- Location: Tai'an, Shandong
- Country: China
- Coordinates: 36°15′21″N 117°06′27″E

Architecture
- Completed: AD 1008 (Song dynasty)

The Dai Temple (simplified Chinese: 岱庙; traditional Chinese: 岱廟; pinyin: Dàimiào), also known as Dongyue Temple (东岳庙) is a Daoist Chinese temple in Tai'an, Shandong province, China, with extant structures dating back to the 11th century. It is a place of worship for Chinese deities and dedicated to Dongyue Dadi, the supreme deity of Mount Tai. The temple is located at the foot of the mountain.

== Design ==
The temple's layout follows imperial palace architecture, with bilateral symmetry along a north-south axis, and its main buildings were once surrounded by a canal fed from the northwest corner and drained at the southeast. Many believe this arrangement, with Mount Tai to the north and flowing water around, conforms to feng shui principles. The complex covers about 96,000 square metres and is enclosed by high walls. The hall is about 48.7 m long from east to west, 19.8 m wide and 22.3 m high. It is encircled by a drum tower to the east, a bell tower to the west, three gates and halls to the south, and the god's residential palace to the north. Inside, a 62 m Song-dynasty mural shows the journey of the Lord of Tai Shan, and it contains more than a thousand figures, each with a distinct posture and expression.

== History ==
The Dai Temple was originally built during the Han dynasty (202 BC – AD 220), and was a site where imperial sacrifices were conducted, starting with Emperor Wu of Han in 110 BC. The Feng Shan sacrifices were discontinued by AD 1008 when the temple was reconstructed and greatly extended during the Song dynasty (968–1279). A settlement around the temple grew into a proper city over time due to many pilgrims visiting the site. An originally rammed earth wall was built around the town and temple in 1162. However, this wall was reconstructed in stone between 1511–1523 during the Ming dynasty (1368–1644), and completed fully with a total length of 4 km in 1553.

== See also ==
- Architecture of the Song dynasty
- Chinese Buddhism
- Religion in China

== Sources ==
- Schinz, Alfred (1996). The Magic Square: Cities in Ancient China. Stuttgart, London, Sungnam (South Korea): Edition Axel Menges, Daehan Printing & Publishing Co., Ltd. ISBN 3930698021.

== External sources ==
- Dai Temple (np.china-embassy.gov.cn)
- Local photographer documents beauty of Dai Temple (chinadaily.com.cn)
