= Tai (given name) =

Tai is a given name. People with the name include:

== People with the given name ==
- Tai Abed (born 2004), Israeli footballer
- Tai Babilonia (born 1959), American figure skater
- Tai Baribo (born 1998), Israeli footballer
- Tai Bundit, Thai volleyball coach
- Tai Collins (born 1962), American model and actress
- Tai Enosa (born 1989), American Samoan rugby player
- Tai Felton (born 2003), American football player
- Tai Geng (died 1667 BC), Chinese king
- TAI Gerszberg, Jewish-American composer and singer of primarily religious music
- Tai Situ Changchub Gyaltsen (1302–1364), Tibetan politician
- Tai Beng Hai (born 1965), Malaysian field hockey player
- Tai Hara (born 1990), Australian actor
- Tai Jia (died 1720 BC), Chinese prince
- Tai Kang, Chinese ruler
- Tai Kato (1916–1985), Japanese film director and screenwriter
- Tai An Khang (born 1994), Malaysian badminton player
- Tai Sing Loo (1886–1971), American photographer
- Tai McIsaac (born 1975), Australian football coach
- Tai Murray (born 1981/82), American violinist
- Tai Nguyen (born 1975), Australian film and television actor
- Tai Odiase (born 1995), Nigerian American basketball player
- Tai Orathai (born Orathai Dabkham, 1980), Thai singer
- Tai Pichit (born Chuchart Trairatanapradit, 1949), Thai snooker player
- Tai Shani (born 1976), British artist
- Tai Si, Chinese wife of King Wen
- Tai Situpa (born 1954), Tibetan lama
- Tai Sodje (born 2003), English professional footballer
- Tai Solarin (1922–1994), Nigerian educator
- Tai Streets (born 1977), American football player
- Tai Telin (fl. 1806), wife of a nobleman in the Maratha princely state of Aundh (present-day India)
- Tai Tuisamoa (born 1980), American rugby union player
- Tai Tuivasa (born 1993), Australian mixed martial arts fighter
- Tai Tura (born 1949), Cook Islands politician
- Tai Tzu-ying (born 1994), Taiwanese badminton player
- Tai Verdes (born 1995), American singer
- Tai Webster (born 1995), New Zealand basketball player
- Tai Wesley (born 1996), American basketball player
- Tai Woffinden (born 1990), British speedway racer
- Tai Tsun Wu (born 1933), American physicist
- Tai Wynyard (born 1998), New Zealand basketball player
- Tai Xiaohu (born 1998), Chinese diver

== See also ==
- Tai (disambiguation)
- Tai (surname)
