= Tai (surname) =

Tai is a surname in various cultures.

== Arabic ==
Tai or al-Ta'i, at-Ta'i (الطائي), also spelled al-Ta'i or at-Ta'iy, is an Arabic name. In ancient times it originated as a nisba indicating affiliation with the Tayy tribe.

- Hatim al-Tai (Hatem ibn Abdellah ibn Sa'ad at-Ta'iy, died 578), Arab poet
- Dawud Tai (Abu Solaiman Dawud ibn Nosair al-Ta'i, died 770s or 780s), Sufi mystic
- Sultan Hashim Ahmad al-Tai (1945–2020), Iraqi Minister of Defense under Saddam Hussein
- Ashraf Tai, Burmese-born Pakistani martial artist who states that he is a descendant of Hatim al-Tai

== Chinese ==
Tái is the Pinyin romanisation of the Chinese surname written using the character 邰. According to traditional stories recorded in the Shuowen Jiezi, it originated as a toponymic surname referring to the city by the same name.

- Tai Chih-yuan (邰智源; born 1965), Taiwanese comedian
- Samuel Tai (邰正宵; born 1966), Hong Kong-born Taiwan singer

Tái is also the Pinyin romanisation of the Chinese surname written using the character 台.

- Tai Xiaohu (台晓虎; born 1998), Chinese diver

Tai may also be the Wade-Giles transcription of Dai (戴); see that page for people with that Chinese surname.

People

- Tai Beng Hai (born 1965), Malaysian field hockey player
- Chen-To Tai (1915—2004), Chinese-American engineer and academic
- Tai Chen-yao (1948–2017), Taiwanese politician
- Tai Cheuk-yin, Hong Kong politician
- Tai Chih-yuan (born 1965), Taiwanese comedian
- Tai Hung-hsu (born 1987), Taiwanese football skier
- Tai An Khang (born 1994), Malaysian badminton player
- Tai Tak-fung (born 1948), Chinese political figure
- Tai Tzu-ying (born 1994), Taiwanese badminton player
- Tai William (born 1997), Taiwanese speed skater
- Tai Xiaohu (born 1998), Chinese diver
- Aaron Tai (born 2006), Malaysian badminton player

== Japanese ==
As a Japanese surname, Tai could be written with the single characters 太, 台, 泰, or 載, as well as numerous two-character combinations from one character read ta (e.g. 田, 多) and another read i (e.g. on-yomi of 衣 or kun-yomi of 居 or 井). People with these surnames include:

- Ichiro Tai, Japanese electrical engineer
- Miyuki Tai (born 1980), Japanese badminton player
- Yūki Tai (泰 勇気; born 1977), Japanese voice actor

== Korean ==
Tai is an alternative spelling of the Korean surname Tae (Korean: 태; Hanja: 太). In a study by the National Institute of the Korean Language based on 2007 application data for South Korean passports, it was found that 28.5% of people with that surname spelled it in Latin letters as Tai in their passports, vs. 57.1% as Tae.

== Other ==
- Alice Tai (born 1999), British paralympic swimmer
- António Taí (born 1948), Portuguese footballer
- Daniel Tai (born 1977), New Zealand boxer
- Eric Tai (born 1964), New Zealand actor of Tongan descent
- Jordan Tai (born 1982), New Zealand boxer and kickboxer
- Katherine Tai (born 1974), American diplomat
- Kobe Tai (born 1972), stage name of an American pornographic actress of Asian descent, changed from Coby Ty to sound "more ethnic" for marketing purposes
- Soaeb Tai (born 1989), Indian cricketer

== See also ==
- Tai (disambiguation)
- Tai (given name)
