= Feng Shan =

Chinese festival

Feng Shan sacrifice
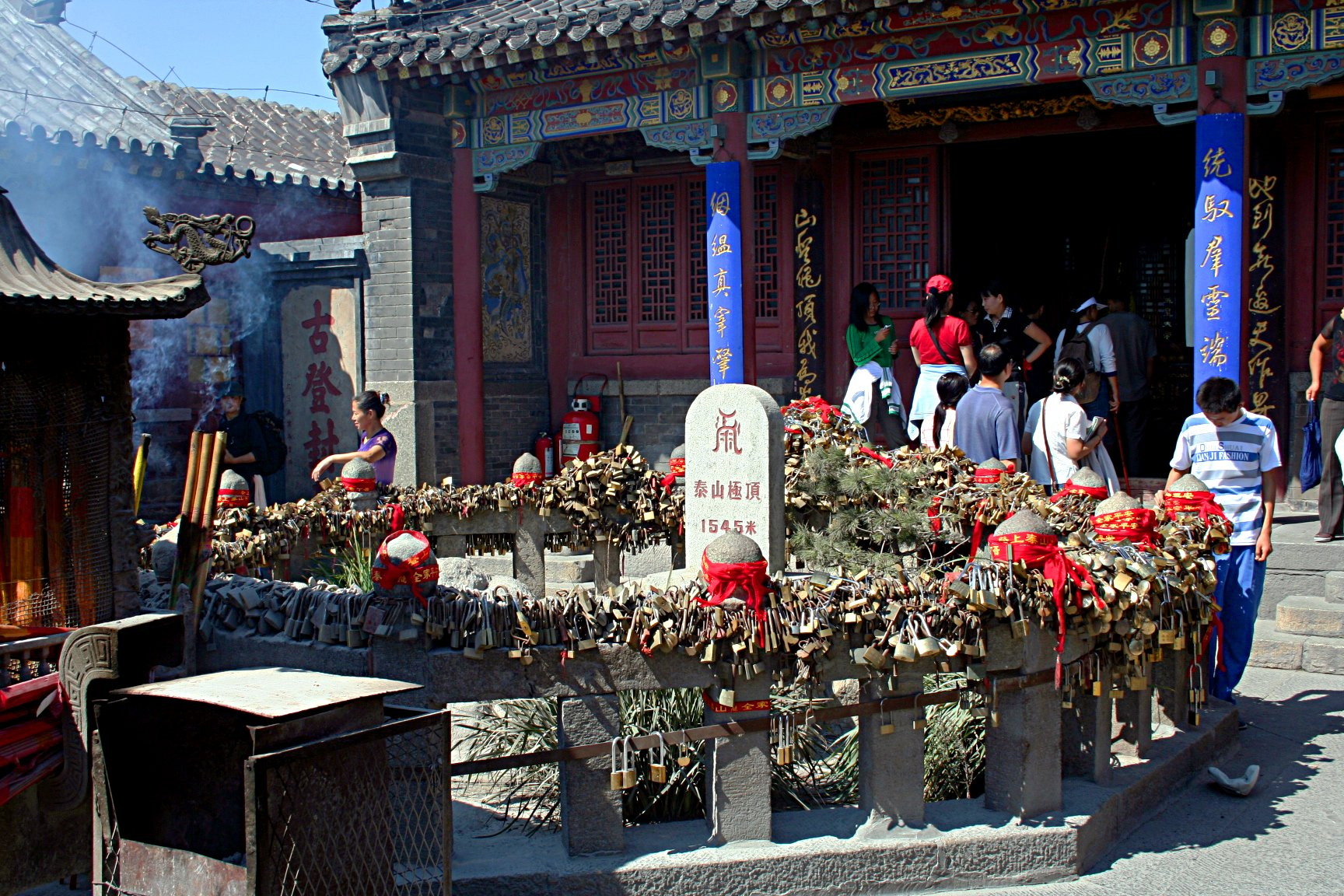
- Jade Emperor Peak, the summit of Mt. Tai
- Organiser: Emperor of China

Feng Shan or feng-shan (Chinese: 封禪), also referred to as the Feng and Shan sacrifices, was an official rite offered by the Son of Heaven (kings of Zhou and later emperors of China) to pay homage to heaven and earth. The sacrifices were usually offered at Mount Tai, the highest peak in the area, and nearby Mount Liangfu. The emperor would pay homage to heaven (on the summit) and earth (at the foot of the mountain) in the Feng (Chinese: 封; pinyin: Fēng) and Shan (Chinese: 禪; pinyin: Shàn) sacrifices respectively. Completing Feng Shan allowed the emperor to receive the mandate of heaven. The term 'feng' can roughly be translated to mean "to seal", while the term 'shan' can roughly be translated to mean "to clear away".

It is considered among the most important rituals of religious Confucianism.

According to the Records of the Grand Historian, Feng involved building altars out of soil at the peak of Mt. Tai and proclaiming the merits and legitimacy of the emperor to god of heaven. Shan involved clearing land at the foot of the mountain to show respect for the god of earth.

It was seen as a point by which emperors could meditate on the relationship between heaven and earth.

While historically considered limited to the Emperor, commoners have performed the ceremony at times without imperial permission. The general Huo Qubing did it alone.

It is considered a prerequisite that the empire is in a period of prosperity with a good emperor and auspicious signs to perform the ritual. Many sovereigns refused to perform the ritual citing themselves as unworthy of it.

They are considered parallel to the Secular Games of the Roman Empire in their political role with both being highly infrequent celebrations. Both had high religious significance and were influential in changing narratives of power.

== History ==
Worship at Mount Tai began in prehistoric times. The Yellow Emperor is said to have performed the ceremony before ascending to heaven as an immortal. It continued through the Zhou dynasty. During the Warring States Period, Mount Tai was located on the border between Qi and Lu, and leaders from both nations would carry out sacrifices at the mountain. In 219 BC, Qin Shihuang carried out what would come to be considered the first Feng and Shan sacrifices in celebration of uniting China under the Qin dynasty.

The second emperor to carry out the sacrifices was Emperor Wu of Han, who conducted them at Mount Tai in 110 BC. This event is regarded as the formal establishment of era names in Chinese history, since Emperor Wu used the Feng Shan sacrifice at Mount Tai to proclaim a new era called yuanfeng (元封). Emperor Gaozong of Tang carried out the Feng and Shan sacrifices more times than any other emperor in Chinese history. Japan, India, the Persian court in exile, Goguryeo, Baekje, Silla, the Turks, Khotan, the Khmer, and the Umayyad Caliphate all had representatives attending the Feng and Shan sacrifices held by Gaozong of Tang in 666 at Mount Tai.

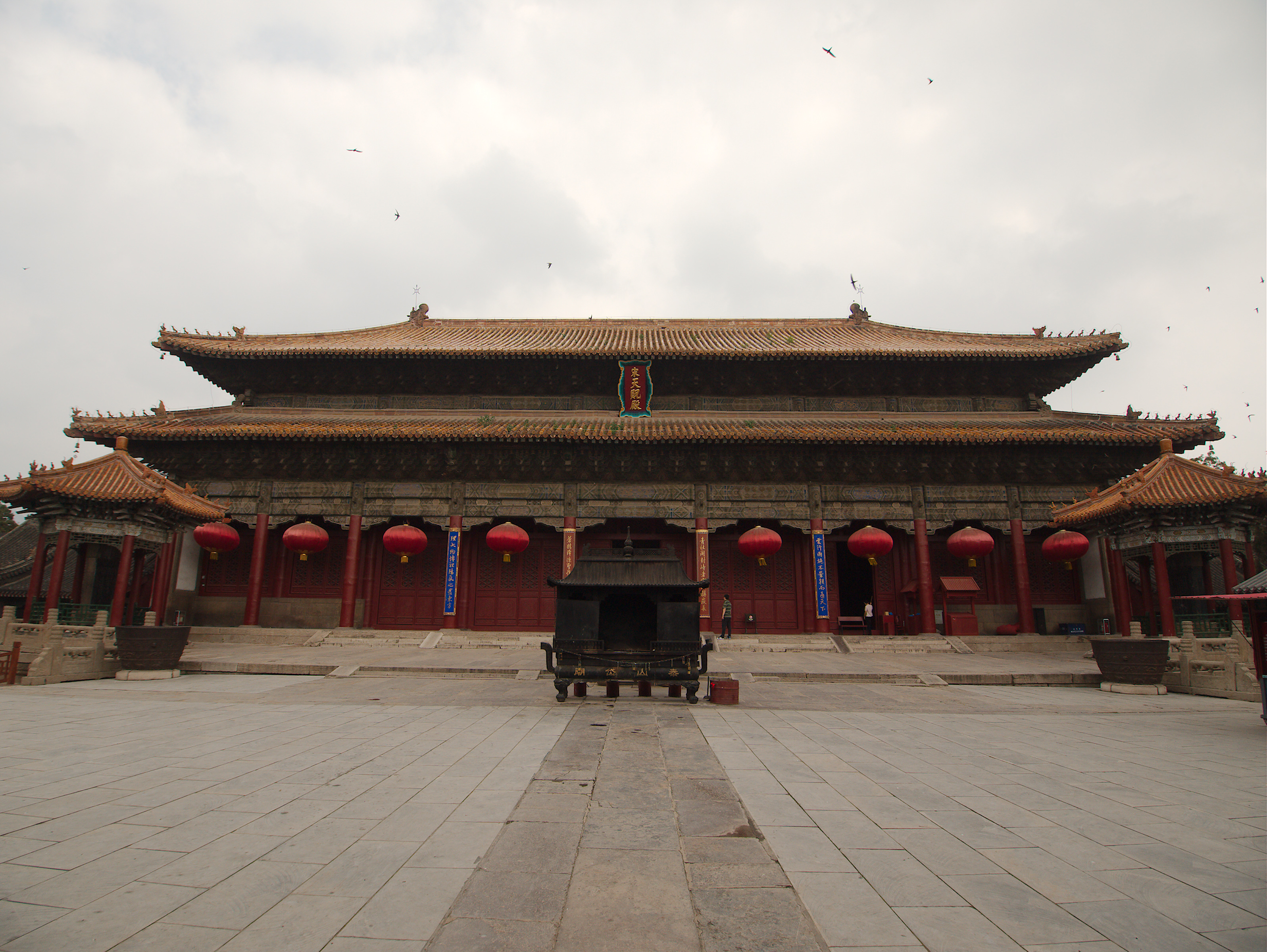
Dai Temple at Mount Tai in Tai'an, Shandong, built during the Song dynasty at the site of the Feng and Shan sacrifices shortly after the last one was held there in 1008

Wu Zetian carried out Feng and Shan sacrifices at Mount Song. The last emperor to carry out Feng and Shan sacrifices was Emperor Zhenzong of the Song dynasty. After the sacrifices were discontinued in 1008 AD, the Dai Temple was built at the site and became a major pilgrimage center during the Song dynasty. Centuries after the Song period, emperors in the Qing dynasty would perform similar rites at Mount Tai. There are only six verifiable accounts of performances in all of Chinese history. The last recorded traditional Feng Shan was done in 1790 by the Qianlong Emperor.

In modern times a festival claiming continuity occurs every year. It is done with a large modern light show. However, the latter did not have any equivalent in the ancient or medieval implementation of the sacrifice.

== In Japan ==
In Japan the Festival of the Six Realms (Japanese: 六道冥官祭) was performed based on the Feng Shan. It was performed from the time of Emperor Go-Yōzei (1571–1617) until the reign of Emperor Kōmei (1831–1867), the last Emperor of the Edo period, was not performed for Emperor Meiji (1852–1912). The Tokugawa shoguns, like the Emperors, have always performed the festival every time they were given the position of shogun by the Emperors. The Tsuchimikado family lost their official position in charge of onmyōdō, and also lost the exclusive right to issue the license, and although they had no choice but to further transform the Tensha Tsuchimikado Shinto into more shintoistically, they were deprived of their influence over private onmyōji in various regions.

The Festival of the Great Emperor of the Sacred Mountain of the East, which is held to honor Dongyue Dadi, the ruler of human life, and the Festival of the Deva and Naraka, which was held every time an Emperor ascended to the throne.

The Daijosai ritual during the coronation of the Emperor is sometimes seen as parallel, but it does not have a ritual continuity or inspiration from the rite.

== See also ==
- Dongyue Emperor
- Daijosai
- Sacrifice to Heaven
