= MV Taishan =

History
- Name: MV Taishan
- Owner: Actinor Shipholdings Norway
- Operator: Wilhelmsen Lines
- Port of registry: Oslo, Norway
- Launched: 11 October 1986
- Completed: 1986
- Identification: IMO number: 8513560 Call sign: LAZP4
- Fate: Scrapped 2016

General characteristics
- Type: PCTC (pure car and truck carrier)
- Tonnage: 48,676 GT; 15,577 DWT
- Length: 195.05 m (639.9 ft)
- Beam: 32.26 m (105.8 ft) (panamax)
- Draft: 8.9 m (29 ft)
- Notes: Capacity: 5,930 cars Stern ramp capacity: 100 MT

MV Taishan was a Wallenius Wilhelmsen-operated ro-ro vessel built in 1986, owned by Actinor Shipholdings Norway and given on a long-term bareboat charter to Wilhelmsen Lines for EUKOR service.

As has been the trend in Wilhelmsen lines, there were also earlier vessels named Taishan; however these were not ro-ro vessels.

The vessel had thirteen car decks, of which four were hoistable (most hoisted using a deck lifter and some hoisted using wires). The vessel also had two center ramps on the port and starboard side, but these were rarely used.

The vessel was named after Mount Taishan, and a brick from this mountain was kept in a glass case in the officers' smoke room.

She was broken up at Chittagong from 24 September 2016.
