= Bixia Yuanjun =

Goddess in Taoism

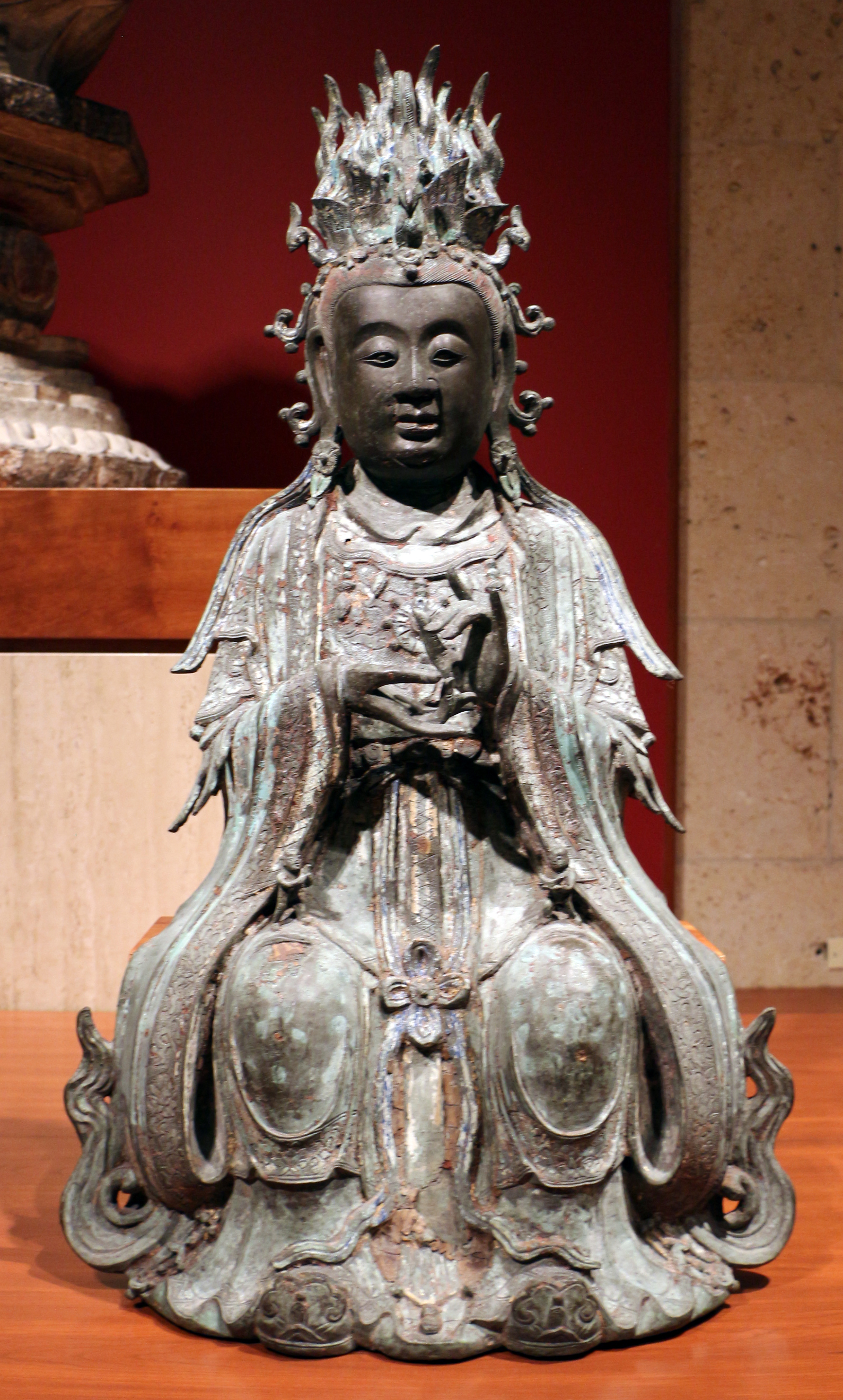
Statue of Bixia Yuanjun in Art Institute of Chicago

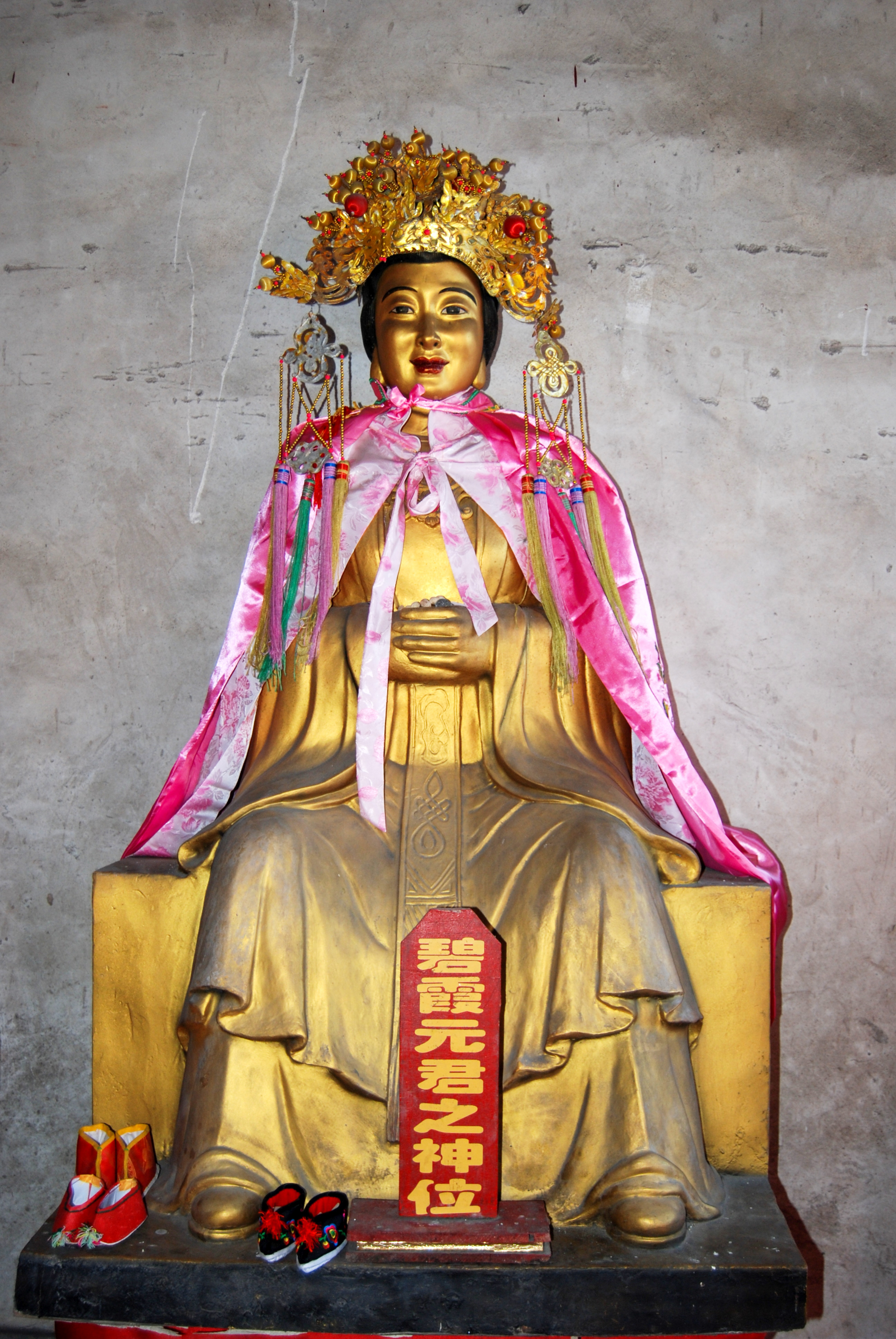
Statue of Bixia Yuanjun at Mount Tai

Bixia Yuanjun (Chinese: 碧霞元君; lit. 'The Primordial Sovereign of the Colored Clouds of Dawn'), also known as Taishan Niangniang (泰山娘娘, 'The Lady of Mount Tai'), is the goddess of Mount Tai, childbirth and destiny in Chinese traditional religion (Taoism).

Bixia Yunjun became an important deity in China, particularly in the north during the Ming and Qing dynasties. She has also been conflated with various matron deities such as the bodhisattva Guanyin particularly in the south.

== General description ==
=== Name and title ===
The name Bixia Yuanjun has been rendered variously in English-language sources (‛Sovereign of the Clouds of Dawn', ‛The Primordial Goddess of the Morning Clouds', ‛Princess of the Azure Clouds' etc.).

Bixia Yuanjun has also been conferred such honorary titles such as Tianxian Yünu (Chinese: 天仙玉女; lit. 'Heavenly Immortal Jade Maiden') (Note: A title bestowed upon by Jiajing Emperor of the Ming dynasty.) and Tianxian Shengmu (天仙聖母; 'Heavenly Immortal Holy Mother').

However, she is commonly known by such names as Tianxian niangniang (天仙娘娘; 'Our Lady Heavenly Immortal'), Taishan Niangniang (泰山娘娘; 'Our Lady/Empress of Mount Tai'), Taishan Laomu (泰山老母; 'Grandma of Mount Tai'), or simply lao nainai (老奶奶; 'old grandma', 'granny').

=== Attributes and conflations ===
Bixia Yuanjun is the Taoist goddess associated with Mount Tai in Shandong Province, regarded as a deity of childbirth, the dawn, and destiny. She purportedly governs human life-span, judges the dead, (Note: The control over destiny and judgeship over the dead in the underworld are attributes of Dongyue Dadi or Yanluo, considered to be her father (see below).) and heeds the pleas for children in need, especially male children (thus being capable of causing a male offspring to be born to a household).

Bixia Yuanjun has become conflated with various matron goddesses, and she became northern China's equivalent to the bodhisattva Guanyin (Avalokitesvara), whose cult was powerful in central and southern China.

=== Depiction ===
Her iconography is typified by her wearing a three-phoenix (or more) headdress.

== Legends ==
There are many legends of Bixia Yuanjun. She is a composite representation of multiple historical personalities. There are versions which depict her as a daughter of Dongyue Dadi (Grand Emperor of Mount Tai), the main deity of Mount Tai and Lord of the underworld, or alternatively the judge Yanluo (Chinese: 閻羅) conceived of as the former's subordinate in the Chinese folk religious (or Taoist) scheme. Late Ming sources assert that Taishan Niangniang was the daughter of a commoner.

Her derelict statue was supposedly discovered on the holy mountain in the year 1008 by Emperor Zhenzong of the Song Dynasty, according to a story promoted by a 1635 guidebook.

The official Taoist hagiography of Bixia Yuanjun is contained in a text entitled History of Mount Tai, compiled by Zha Zhilong (1554–86) and included in the Wanli Emperor's reign (1573-1620) supplement to the Taoist Canon, printed in 1607.

During the Ming and early Qing dynasties, Taishan Niangniang became one of the most popular deities in North China with her influence actively spread by Tai'an City, Shandong Province; her following extended to the Lower Yangzi region as well, and she also enjoyed significant patronage from the imperial court., particularly during the Ming and Qing dynasties. This had a great impact on the culture of northern China. As the goddess of dawn, she attends the birth of each new day from her home high in the clouds. As the goddess of childbirth, she attends the birth of children, fixing their destiny and bringing good fortune. Bixia Yuanjin is venerated in the Temple of the Purple Dawn at the summit of the holy mountain, Mount Tai, where women wishing to conceive come to ask for her help.

== Temples ==
The Palace of the Clouds of Dawn (Bixia Gong), a shrine to the goddess, was built at the top of Mount Tai during the Ming dynasty and is still a focus of pilgrimage worship. Her popularity is widespread today. Many cities in China have temples dedicated to Bixia Yuanjun. In Beijing, the Temple of the Eastern Peak (Dongyue Miao) contains a hall dedicated to the goddess, as does the White Cloud Monastery (Baiyun Guan). In Taoist painting and sculpture, she is often accompanied by nine other attendant goddesses, including the goddess of fertility Zhusheng Niangniang and the goddess of eyesight Yanguang Niangniang.
