= Yasushi Shikano =

Japanese photographer

Yasushi Shikano (鹿野 寧, Shikano Yasushi; 1902–1994) was a renowned Japanese photographer.
