= Dongyue Dadi =

Chinese Lord of Mount Tai

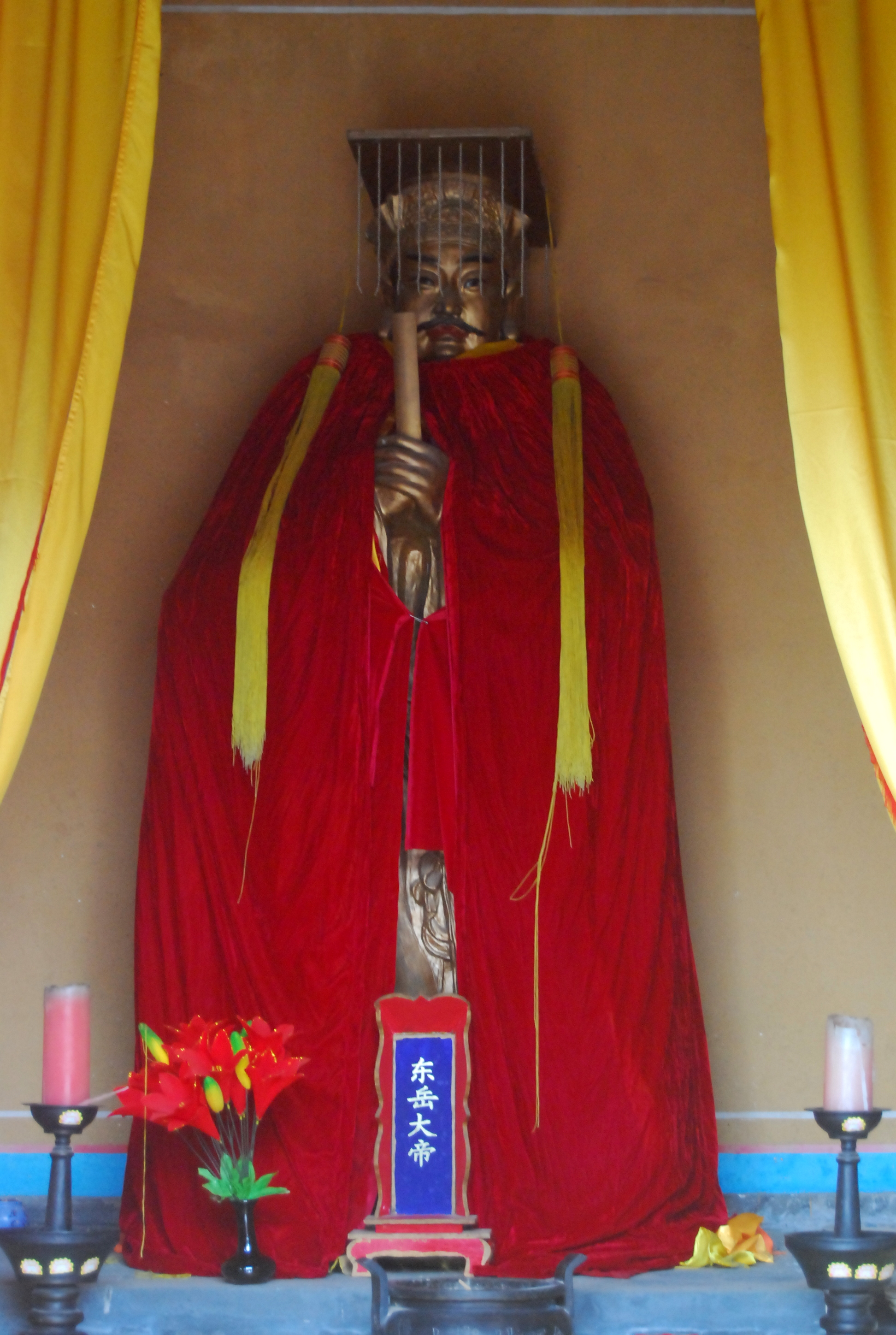
- Statue of the Dongyue Emperor on Miaofeng Mountain
- Traditional Chinese: 東嶽大帝
- Simplified Chinese: 东岳大帝
- Literal meaning: The Great Emperor of the Eastern
Transcriptions
Standard Mandarin
- Hanyu Pinyin: Dōngyuè Dàdì

Emperor Dongyue (or Chinese: 東嶽大帝; pinyin: Dongyue Dadi; lit. 'The Great Emperor of the Eastern Peak') is a Daoist deity of the sacred mountain Mount Tai. He is also believed to be the leader of a large bureaucratic celestial ministry overseeing the maintenance of the Book of Life (生死簿), a register of the due dates on which each and every human soul must be summoned before the Judges of Hell for judgement. Dongyue Dadi is also considered significant in Chinese Buddhism. He is the personification of Cangdi as the "Great Deity of the Eastern Peak" (东岳大帝), which is Mount Tai. As the incarnation of Mount Tai, he is the holy messenger of communication between heaven and the world, and the patron saint of the emperors of all dynasties who was ordered by the sky to govern the world.

According to Chinese mythology, Dongyue Dadi is believed to be either the father or the husband of Bixia Yuanjun, who is a goddess associated with Mount Tai and childbirth. He is regarded as one of the Sixteen Devas (十六諸天; Shíliù Zhūtiān), the Twenty Devas (二十諸天; Èrshí Zhūtiān) and the Twenty-Four Devas (二十四諸天; Èrshísì zhūtiān). Every year, on the 28th day of the third lunar month, Dongyue Dadi's birthday is celebrated by devotees from all over the country who gather to burn incense and offer prayers in honor of the deity.

== Legends ==
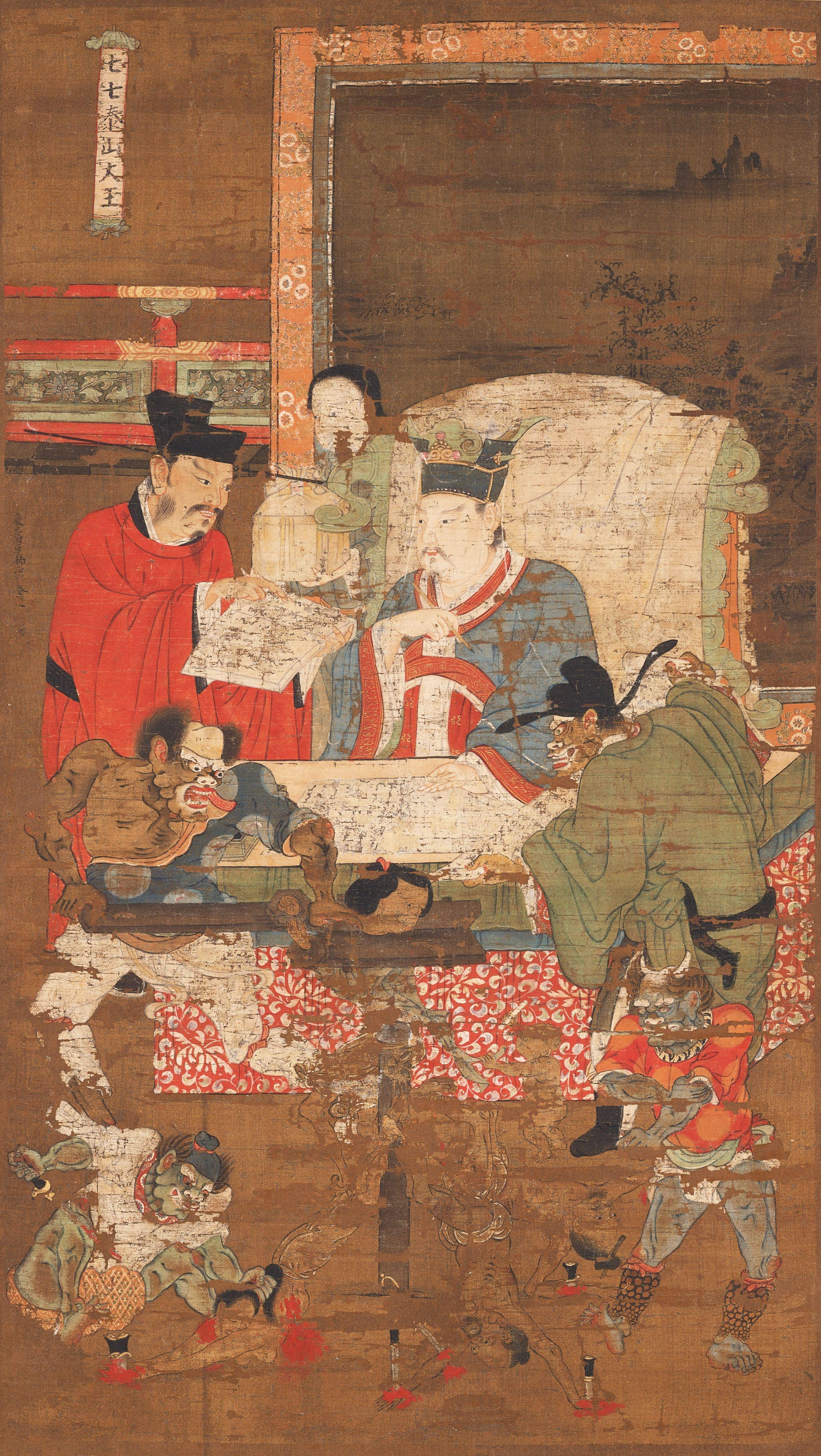
The King Taishan, one of the ten kings of hell

Since ancient times, the Mount Tai has been seen as a sacred place where the spirits of the dead gather, so the god of Mount Tai was thought to be the supreme deity of the underworld, who governed the lifespan and status of humans. He was reportedly the grandson of the Jade Emperor.

In the Investiture of the Gods (Fengshen Yanyi), Dongyue Dadi is portrayed as Huang Feihu, a general who served under Di Xin. Huang Feihu was originally known as Prince Wucheng (武成王) of the Shang dynasty. He defected to Xiqi (西岐; precursor to the Zhou dynasty), a vassal state under Shang. He later participates in a campaign by King Wu of the Zhou dynasty to overthrow Di Xin. He was killed in a battle against Shang general Zhang Kui (張奎). Jiang Ziya posthumously granted him the title of Dongyue Taishan Tianqi Rensheng Dadi (東嶽泰山天齊仁聖大帝; "leader of the rulers of the Five Sacred Mountains"). The Taoist immortal Bingling Dijun, has been described as the third son of Dongyue Dadi.

Han dynasty emperors performed the Feng Shan ceremony on Mount Tai. The ceremony was considered very important and completing Feng Shan allowed the emperor to receive the mandate of heaven. The practice began in 219 BC, when the Qin Shi Huang gave homage to the mountain after he unified China.

Under the Eastern Han dynasty, Dongyue Dadi transformed from a mountain god to a Daoist deity as a result of the influence of Daoism and Buddhism. In Daoist belief, the deity of Mount Tai was either an ancient saint or the descendant of Fuxi. The Shen-yi Jing, portrayed this deity as the offspring of a descendant of Pangu who was granted the title Taihua Zhenren. This title was the basis for Dongyue Dadi's development in Daoism and elevated him to the status known as Xian Ren, which placed him in the hierarchy of Daoist immortals.

According to The Collection of Gods in Three Religions (三教搜神大全), Dongyue Dadi was born as Jinhong, the son of Miao descendant Jinlun Wang Shaohai (who was the ninth generation of Pangu) and his wife Milun Xianǚ (彌綸仙女). Jinhong performed meritorious service in Changbai Mountain and was later granted the title of Tai Sui by Fuxi's family.

In Chinese Buddhism, Dongyue Dadi was believed to serve as the judge of the Underworld. This perception emerged during the Six Dynasty period, and the deity's title in Buddhist scriptures was Taishan Fujun, which was subsequently assimilated into the concept of the Buddhist Hell, Diyu. Consequently, Taishan Fujun was regarded as one of the ten kings of hell or even as a prince of the seventh king of hell. He is referred to as Dongyue Dadi in Daoism and Chinese folk religion, while Taishan Fujun is his only title in Buddhist scriptures.

In Taoist belief, Wudao Jiangjun (The Five Path Generals, 五道将军) are subordinate deities serving Dongyue Dadi.

== Popularity ==
Dongyue Dadi cults lost prominence in the Ming dynasty to those of Bixia Yuanjun.

== In popular culture ==
The ritual of the storming of the city (打城) is performed in Taiwan and associated with Dongyue Dadi as the ruler of hell. This ritual involves a ritual specialist, who can either be a Daoist or a master in popular religion, storming the city wall of the underworld to rescue the soul of a deceased individual. The ritual consists of ten distinct stages, which include inviting Dongyue Dadi, summoning the soul of the deceased, confessing the soul's sins, beginning the journey to leave the underworld, practicing divination, departing from the underworld, administering medicine to the soul, offering a bowl of rice, guiding the soul across the bridge, and enabling the soul to be reborn in a more favorable location. The attendees of the ritual include the deceased's family members as well as the Daoist or master of popular religion.

== Temple ==
The shrine of Dongyue Dadi

There are seven temples dedicated to Dongyue Dadi in Taiwan and throughout the mainland China, with the famous Dongyue Temple located in Tainan City, known for its Da-cheng ritual.

The Beijing Dongyue Temple is situated north of Chaoyangmenwai Street in Beijing, covering an area of 60,000 square meters. It is a significant cultural heritage protection site in Beijing. The temple was constructed in 1319 during the Yuan dynasty using funds raised by Zhang Liusun of the Zhengyi Sect (張留孫), a Taoist priest and descendant of Zhang Daoling.

== See also ==
- Bixia Yuanjun
- Mount Tai
- Feng Shan
- Yanluo Wang
