= Ichiro Tai =

Ichiro Tai from the Toshiba Corporation, Minato-ku, Tokyo, Japan was named Fellow of the Institute of Electrical and Electronics Engineers (IEEE) in 2012 for leadership in development of nuclear instrumentation and control systems.
