= Yanguang Niangniang =

Goddess of eyesight and vision in Taoism

Yanguang Niangniang (Chinese: 眼光娘娘; lit. 'Our Lady Who Heals Eyesight') is a Taoist goddess of eyesight and vision. She was one of the popular Taoist goddesses in China during the Ming and Qing dynasties. She is believed to cure blindness and other ailments related to vision. In Daoist paintings or sculptures, she is often seen accompanying Bixia Yuanjun among other attendant goddesses.
