= Morgh Mohsen-e Tai =

Village in Lorestan province, Iran

Morgh Mohsen-e Tai Persian: مرغ محسن طائي
- Village
- Location within Iran
- Coordinates: 33°11′39″N 48°15′11″E
- Country: Iran
- Province: Lorestan
- County: Mamulan
- District: Afrineh
- Rural District: Miyankuh-e Sharqi

Population (2016)
  - Total: 58
- Time zone: UTC+3:30 (IRST)

Morgh Mohsen-e Tai (Persian: مرغ محسن طائي) (Note: Also romanized as Morgh Moḩsen-e Tā’ī; also known as Margh-e Moḩsen Ţalā’ī, Morgh Moḩsen, and Tā’ī) is a village in Miyankuh-e Sharqi Rural District of Afrineh District in Mamulan County, Lorestan province, Iran.

== Demographics ==
=== Population ===
At the time of the 2006 National Census, the village's population was 120 in 23 households, when it was in Mamulan District (Note: Renamed the Central District of Mamulan County) of Pol-e Dokhtar County. The following census in 2011 counted 112 people in 26 households. The 2016 census measured the population of the village as 58 people in 19 households.

In 2023, the district was separated from the county in the establishment of Mamulan County and renamed the Central District. The rural district was transferred to the new Afrineh District.
