= Mount Tai =

Mountain in Shandong, China

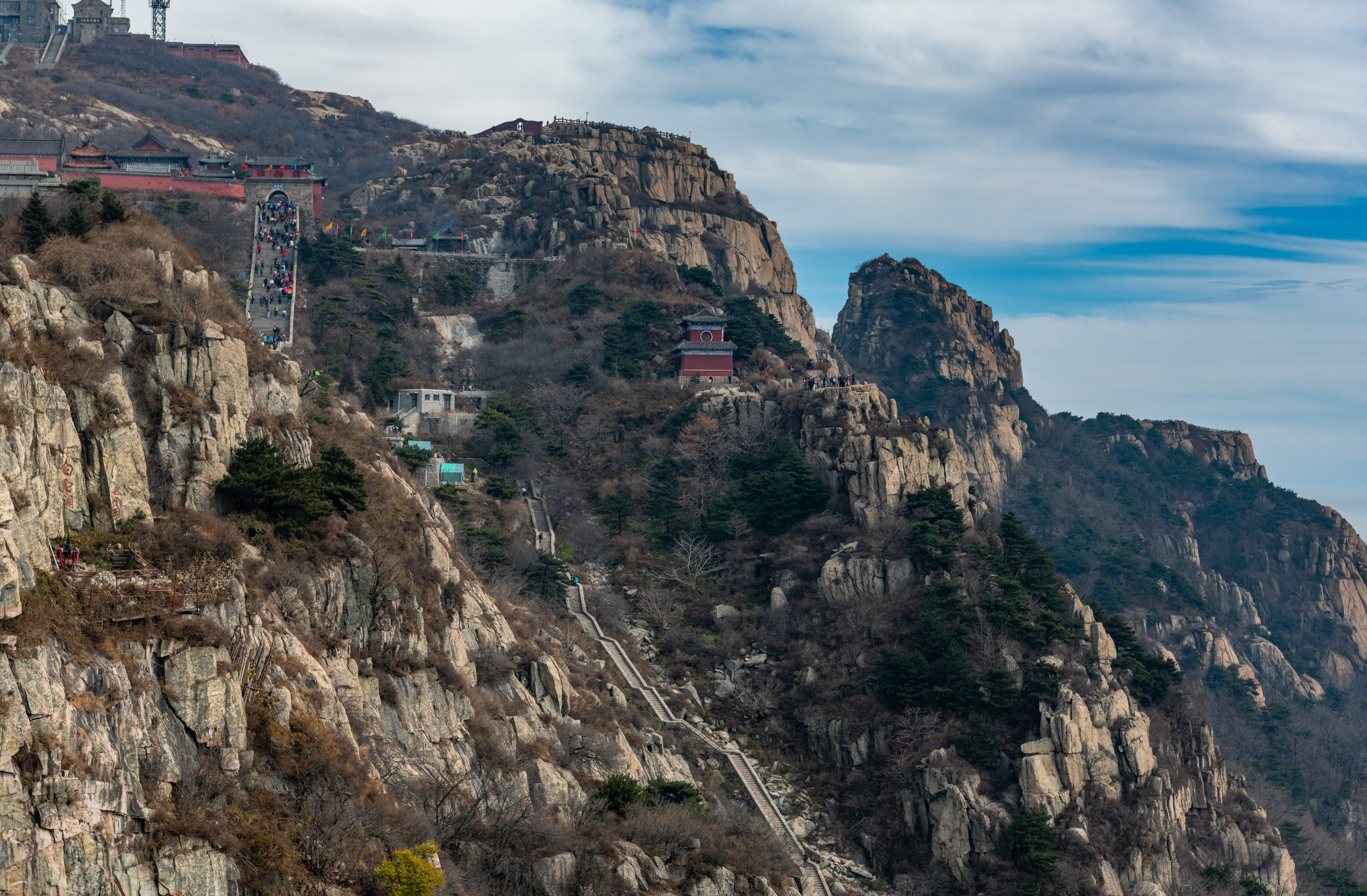
- Jade Emperor Peak of Mount Tai

Highest point
- Elevation: 1,532.7 m (5,029 ft)
- Prominence: 1,505 m (4,938 ft)
- Listing: Ultra
- Coordinates: 36°15′21″N 117°06′27″E

Geography
- Location within Shandong Location within Northern China Location within China
- Location: Tai'an, Shandong

Geology
- Rock age: Cambrian
- Mountain type(s): metamorphic, sedimentary

Climbing
- Easiest route: Cable Car

UNESCO World Heritage Site
- Criteria: Cultural: i, ii, iii, iv, v, vi; Natural: vii
- Reference: 437
- Inscription: 1987 (11th Session)
- Area: 25,000 ha (62,000 acres)

Mount Tai
- "Mount Tai" in Chinese characters
- Chinese: 泰山
- Literal meaning: "exalted mountain"
Transcriptions
Standard Mandarin
- Hanyu Pinyin: Tài Shān
- Wade–Giles: T'ai^{4} shan^{1}
- IPA: [tʰâɪ ʂán]
Wu
- Romanization: Tah^{入} sae^{平}
Yue: Cantonese
- Yale Romanization: Taai sāan
- Jyutping: Taai^{3} saan^{1}
Southern Min
- Hokkien POJ: Thài san
Middle Chinese
- Middle Chinese: tʰaj ʂean
Old Chinese
- Baxter–Sagart (2014): *l̥ˤa[t]-s s-ŋrar

Alternative Chinese name
- Chinese: 岱山、岱岳、岱宗、太山、东岳
Transcriptions
Standard Mandarin
- Hanyu Pinyin: Dài shān

Mount Tai (Chinese: 泰山; pinyin: Tài Shān) or Taishan is a mountain of historical and cultural significance located north of the city of Tai'an. It is the highest point in Shandong province, China. The tallest peak is the Jade Emperor Peak (simplified Chinese: 玉皇顶; traditional Chinese: 玉皇頂; pinyin: Yùhuáng Dǐng), which is commonly reported as being 1,545 meters (5,069 ft) tall.

Mount Tai is known as the eastern mountain of the Sacred Mountains of China. It is associated with sunrise, birth, and renewal, and is often regarded the foremost of the five. Mount Tai has been a place of worship for at least 3,000 years and served as one of the most important ceremonial centers of China during large portions of this period. Because of its sacred importance and dramatic landscape, it was made a UNESCO World Heritage Site in 1987. It meets 7 of the 10 evaluation standards for World Heritage sites, and is listed as a World Heritage site that meets the most of the standards, along with the Tasmanian Wilderness World Heritage Area in Australia.

An earthquake or thunderstorm occurred around Mount Tai in 1831 BC or 1652 BC, also known as the Mount Tai earthquake. This event was first recorded in the Bamboo Annals, and at present, it is recognized by most scholars as the first recorded earthquake in Chinese history.

== Location ==
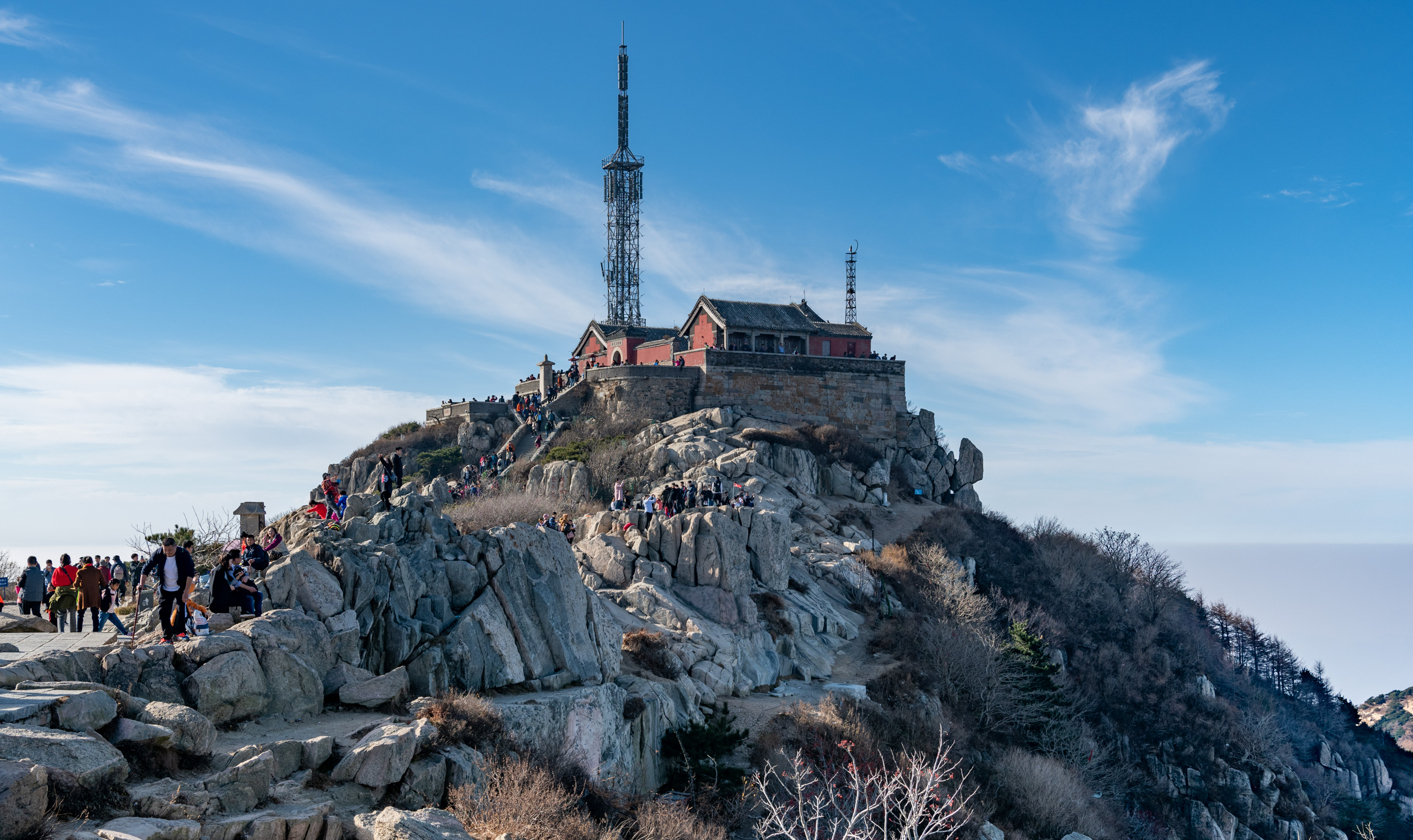
Jade Emperor Peak, the summit of Mount Tai

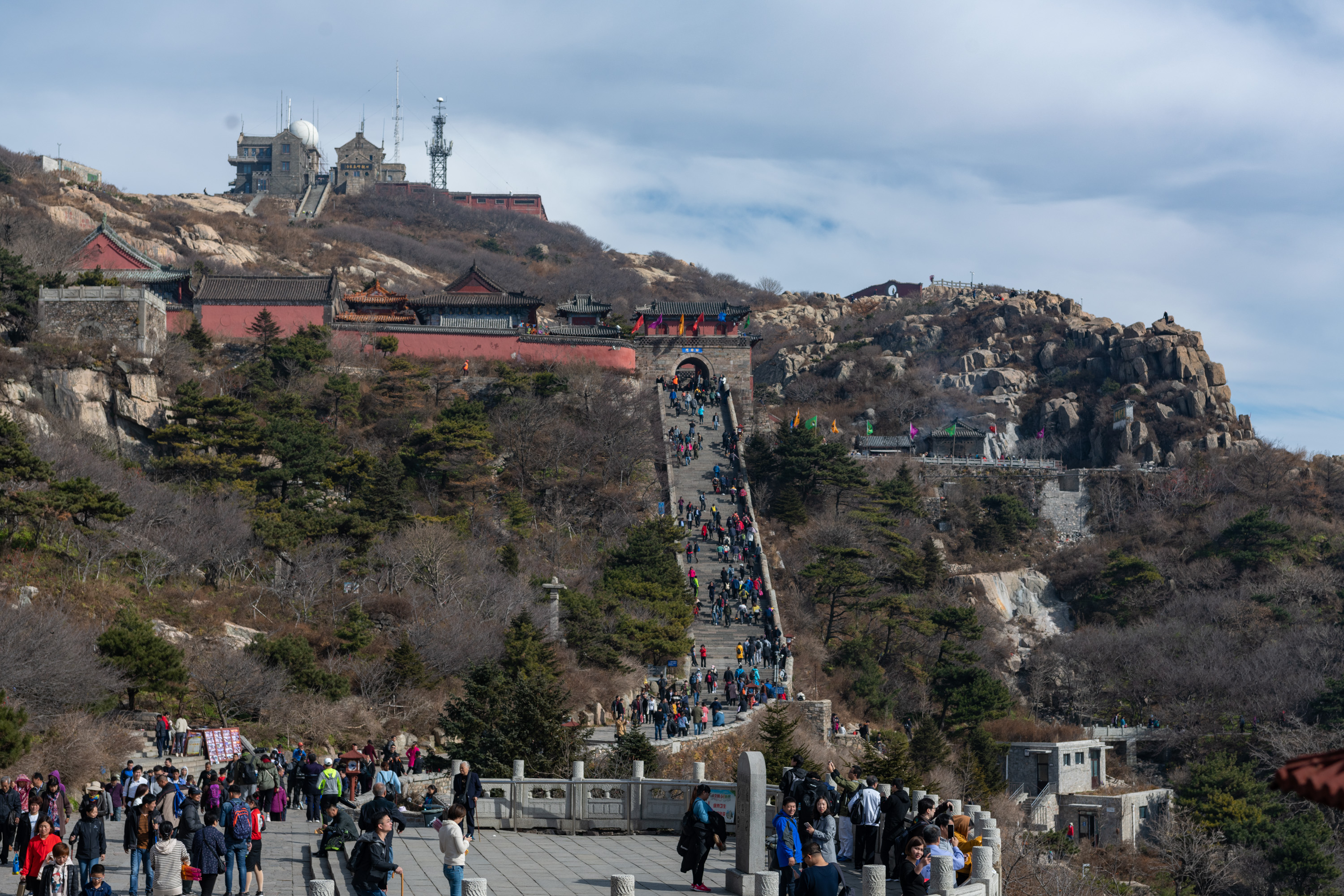
Path to the summit

Mount Tai is located in central Shandong, just north of the city of Tai'an and to the south of the provincial capital Jinan. It extends from 150–1,545 meters (492–5,069 ft) above sea level and covers an area of 426 km^{2} (164 sq mi) at its base. The Jade Emperor Peak, which rises 1,532.7 meters (5,029 ft) above sea level, is located at 36° 16′N and 117° 6′E. Not 5 runs though.

=== Geological origin speculation ===
Mount Tai was formed in the middle of the Cenozoic about 30 million years ago. The stratum of Mount Tai is ancient, mainly composed of several ancient rocks such as mixed rock, mixed granite and various gneiss. The government prevents exploration of the caves, for they are unassessed and potentially dangerous. The Luxi region (including Mount Tai) used to be a huge subsiding belt or sea canal. The orogeny made the rock layers on the subsidence zone folded and uplifted into ancient land, forming a huge mountain system, which has experienced 2 billion years of weathering and denudation, and the terrain has gradually become flat. About 600 million years ago, Mount Tai sank into the sea again. After more than 100 million years, the entire area rose to land again, and the ancient Mount Tai uplifted into a relatively low barren hill. In the late Mesozoic period about 100 million years ago, due to the extrusion and subduction of the Pacific plate to the Eurasian Plate, the Taishan stratum experienced extensive folds and fractures under the influence of the Yanshanian. During the crustal movement above, Mount Tai was rapidly uplifted. In the mid-Cenozoic period about 30 million years ago, the outline of Mount Tai as it is known today was formed.

=== Climatic vegetation ===
Due to its height, Mount Tai has a vertical climate gradient. The lower part of the mountain is a warm temperate zone and the top of the mountain is a medium temperate zone. The mountain is cloudy and foggy, with an average annual precipitation of 1132mm, while the surrounding area receives only 750mm. Taishan scattering coverage rate reaches 80%. On the foothills, deciduous forests, broad-leaved coniferous mixed forests, coniferous forest, alpine shrubs and grass can be seen in sequence. The vertical boundaries of the forest belts are distinct and the vegetation landscapes are different. There are 989 species of seed plants in 144 families, including 433 species of woody plants in 72 families, 556 species of herbaceous plants in 72 families, and 462 species of medicinal plants in 111 families.

== History ==
Traces of human presence at Mount Tai date back to the Paleolithic period. Evidence of human settlement of the area can be proven from the Neolithic period onwards. During this time, two cultures had emerged near the mountain, the Dawenkou culture to the south and the Longshan culture to the north.

During the Xia dynasty (c. 2070–1600 BC) the mountain was known as Mount Dai (Chinese: 岱山; pinyin: Dài Shān) and lay within the borders of Qingzhou, one of the Nine Provinces of ancient China.

Religious worship of Mount Tai has a tradition dating back 3,000 years, from the time of the Shang (c. 1600–1046 BC) to the Qing dynasty (1644–1912). Over time, this worship evolved into the Feng and Shan sacrifices or Fengshan. The sacrifices were an official imperial rite and Mount Tai became one of the principal places where the emperor would carry out the sacrifices to pay homage to Heaven on the summit (Feng) and Earth at the foot of the mountain (Shan). Carving of an inscription as part of the sacrifices marked the attainment of the "great peace".

By the time of the Zhou dynasty (c. 1046–256 BC) sacrifices at Mount Tai had become highly ritualized ceremonies in which a local feudal lord would travel there to make sacrifices of food and jade ritual items. These would then be arranged in a ritually correct pattern before being buried on the mountain. In the Spring and Autumn period (771–476 BC) the vassal states of Qi and Lu bordered Mount Tai to the north and south respectively, from where their feudal lords both made independent sacrifices on Mount Tai. According to Zhou ritual belief, the spirit of Mount Tai would only accept sacrifices offered by a feudal lord, leading Confucius (in his Analects 3.6) to criticize the ministers who offered state sacrifices here after usurping power. In the ensuing Warring States period (475–221 BC), to protect itself against invasion, the State of Qi erected a 500-kilometer (310 mi)-long wall, the ruins of which are still present today. The name Tai'an of the neighboring city is attributed to the saying "If Mount Tai is stable, so is the entire country" (both characters of Tai'an, "泰" and "安", have the independent meaning of "peace").

In 219 BC, Qin Shi Huang, the first emperor of China, held a ceremony on the summit and proclaimed the unity of his empire in a well-known inscription. During the Han dynasty (206 BC – 220 AD), the Feng and Shan sacrifices were considered the highest of all sacrifices.

Rituals and sacrifices were conducted by the Sui.

The emperors of past dynasties went to Mount Tai to worship the heavens and tell the earth. Confucian Buddhism, preaching, and experience, and cultural figures climbed the mountain, leaving behind a dazzling array of stone inscriptions, cliffs, and couplet stone carvings. The cliff carvings on Mount Tai are also the most famous mountains. There are more than 1,800 stone inscriptions in Mount Tai, including more than 800 steles and 1,000 cliff stone inscriptions, distributed in 157 at Daimiao, 215 at Dailu, 576 at Shantou East Road, 258 at Daiding, more than 80 at Daixi, 44 at Daiyin, more than 400 locations in Lingyan Temple, and more than 100 locations in Shentong Temple. It mainly includes 5 types of sacrificial ceremonies of the emperors of the past dynasties, the creation and restoration of temples, the tomb inscriptions of the stone scriptures, the poems of chants, the scenery and the couplets, most of which are natural stone inscriptions.

Japan, India, the Persian court in exile, Goguryeo, Baekje, Silla, the Turks, Khotan, the Khmer, and the Umayyad Caliphate all had representatives attending the Feng and Shan sacrifices held by Emperor Gaozong of Tang in 666 at Mount Tai.

Also, Chinese worshippers of the mountain who were not nobles have also played an important role in the history of communities near the mountain and pilgrimage across China.

In 2003, Mount Tai attracted around six million visitors. A renovation project was completed in late October 2005, which was aimed at restoring cultural relics and renovating damaged buildings of cultural significance. Widely known for its special ceremonies and sacrifices, Mount Tai has seen visits by many poets and literary scholars who have traveled there seeking inspiration. There are grandiose temples, many stone inscriptions and stone tablets with the mountain playing an important role in the development of both Buddhism and Taoism.

== Natural significance ==
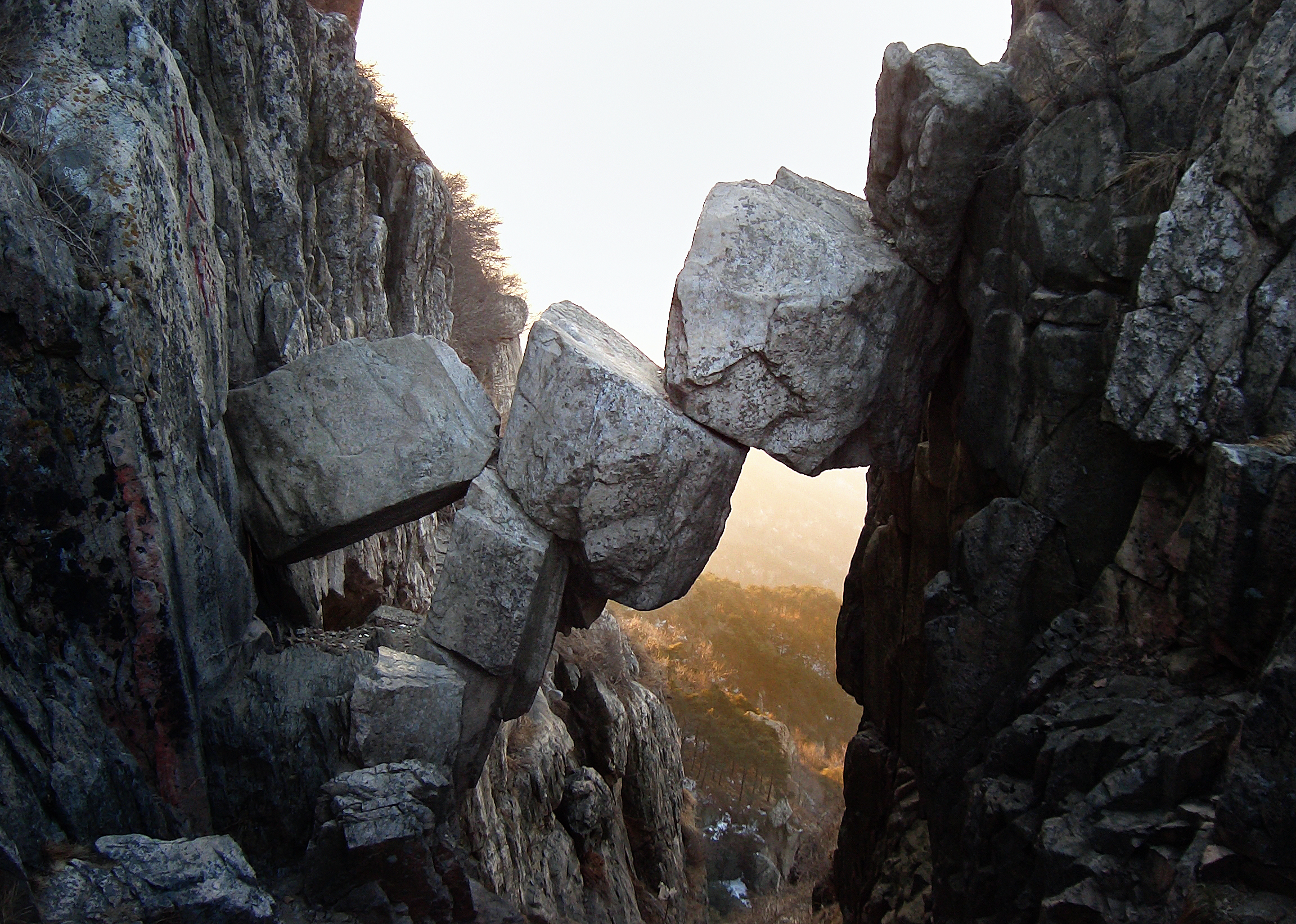
The Immortal Bridge (Chinese: 仙人桥; pinyin: Xiānrén Qiáo), a natural rock formation

Mount Tai is a tilted fault-block mountain with height increasing from the north to the south. It is the oldest example of a paleo-metamorphic formation from the Cambrian Period in eastern China, and is known as the Taishan Complex. The uplift of the region started in the Proterozoic Era; by the end of the Proterozoic, it had become part of the continent.

Besides the Jade Emperor Peak, other distinctive rock formations are the Heaven Candle Peak, the Fan Cliff, and the Rear Rock Basin.

Mount Tai lies in the zone of oriental deciduous forest; about 80% of its area is covered with vegetation. The flora is known to comprise almost 1,000 species. Some of the trees in the area are very old and have cultural significance, such as the Han Dynasty Cypresses, which were planted by the Emperor Wu Di, the Tang Chinese Scholartree (about 1,300 years old), the Welcoming-Guest Pine (500 years old) and the Fifth-Rank Pine, which was named originally by the Emperor Qin Shi Huang, but was replanted about 250 years ago.

=== Physical features ===
Mount Tai rises abruptly from the vast plain of central Shandong, and is naturally endowed with many scenic sites. Geologically, it is a tilted fault-block mountain, higher to the south than north, and is the oldest and most important example of the paleo-metamorphic system representative of the Cambrian Period in eastern China. Referred to as the Taishan Complex, it comprises magnetized, metamorphic, sedimentary rock and an intrusive mass of various origins that were formed in the Archean Era 1700-2000 million years ago. Subsequently, in the Proterozoic Era, the Taishan region began to rise, becoming part of the continent by the end of the era. Uplift continued until the middle of the Cenozoic Era. The gneiss which emerged in the Taishan region is the foundation for all of North China. Cambrian strata, fully emerged in the north, are rich in fossils. Six streams flow from the summit, their water renowned for its extremely low mineral content, slight acidity (pH = 6.3) and relatively high oxygen content (6.4 milligrams per liter (mg/L)).

== Climate ==
The area falls within the warm continental monsoon climate (Koppen Dwb). The average annual temperature is 6.2°C, and it is relatively warm from July to August.

Climate data for Mount Tai, elevation 1,534 m (5,033 ft), (1991–2020 normals, extremes 1951–present)
Month	Jan	Feb	Mar	Apr	May	Jun	Jul	Aug	Sep	Oct	Nov	Dec	Year
Record high °C (°F)	12.4 (54.3)	15.9 (60.6)	19.3 (66.7)	26.9 (80.4)	26.0 (78.8)	27.6 (81.7)	29.7 (85.5)	26.7 (80.1)	26.3 (79.3)	23.5 (74.3)	18.3 (64.9)	14.2 (57.6)	29.7 (85.5)
Mean daily maximum °C (°F)	−3.8 (25.2)	−1.3 (29.7)	4.0 (39.2)	10.5 (50.9)	15.9 (60.6)	19.7 (67.5)	20.9 (69.6)	19.9 (67.8)	16.3 (61.3)	10.9 (51.6)	4.2 (39.6)	−2.1 (28.2)	9.6 (49.3)
Daily mean °C (°F)	−7.2 (19.0)	−4.9 (23.2)	0.0 (32.0)	6.5 (43.7)	12.2 (54.0)	16.2 (61.2)	18.3 (64.9)	17.3 (63.1)	13.2 (55.8)	7.6 (45.7)	0.9 (33.6)	−5.4 (22.3)	6.2 (43.2)
Mean daily minimum °C (°F)	−10.0 (14.0)	−7.8 (18.0)	−3.2 (26.2)	3.1 (37.6)	8.9 (48.0)	13.1 (55.6)	15.8 (60.4)	15.0 (59.0)	10.6 (51.1)	4.9 (40.8)	−2.0 (28.4)	−8.3 (17.1)	3.3 (38.0)
Record low °C (°F)	−27.5 (−17.5)	−24.1 (−11.4)	−20.4 (−4.7)	−13.9 (7.0)	−5.5 (22.1)	−0.9 (30.4)	7.6 (45.7)	4.0 (39.2)	−0.7 (30.7)	−9.1 (15.6)	−21.4 (−6.5)	−24.1 (−11.4)	−27.5 (−17.5)
Average precipitation mm (inches)	10.6 (0.42)	20.4 (0.80)	19.4 (0.76)	51.1 (2.01)	87.4 (3.44)	130.5 (5.14)	283.7 (11.17)	250.9 (9.88)	89.5 (3.52)	52.1 (2.05)	39.3 (1.55)	15.6 (0.61)	1,050.5 (41.35)
Average precipitation days (≥ 0.1 mm)	4.1	5.1	5.5	6.4	8.3	9.9	15.2	14.1	8.4	6.6	5.7	4.1	93.4
Average snowy days	5.4	5.7	5.6	2.3	0.2	0	0	0	0	0.2	3.8	4.9	28.1
Average relative humidity (%)	47	53	55	59	63	72	87	87	73	61	55	49	63
Mean monthly sunshine hours	217.3	200.1	242.9	257.2	277.7	242.1	167.2	167.8	199.0	219.6	207.1	214.0	2,612
Percentage possible sunshine	70	65	65	65	63	55	38	40	54	64	68	71	60
Source: China Meteorological Administration all-time August record high

=== Vegetation ===
Vegetation covers 79.9% of the area, which is densely wooded, but information about its composition is lacking. The flora is diverse and known to comprise 989 species, of which 433 species are woody and the rest herbaceous. Medicinal plants total 462 species and include multiflower knotweed, Cannabis, Taishan ginseng, Chinese gromwell and sealwort, which are renowned throughout the country. Some trees are very old and famous, notably the Han Dynasty Cypresses (planted 2,100 years ago by Emperor Wu Di of the Han dynasty), 'Welcoming Guest Pine' (500 years old) and 'Fifth Rank Pine' (named by Emperor Qin Shi Huang of the Qin dynasty).

=== Fauna ===
There are over 200 species of animals in addition to 122 species of birds, but precise details are lacking. Large-scaled fish Varicorhinus macrolepis is found in running water at 300–800 m.

== Cultural significance ==
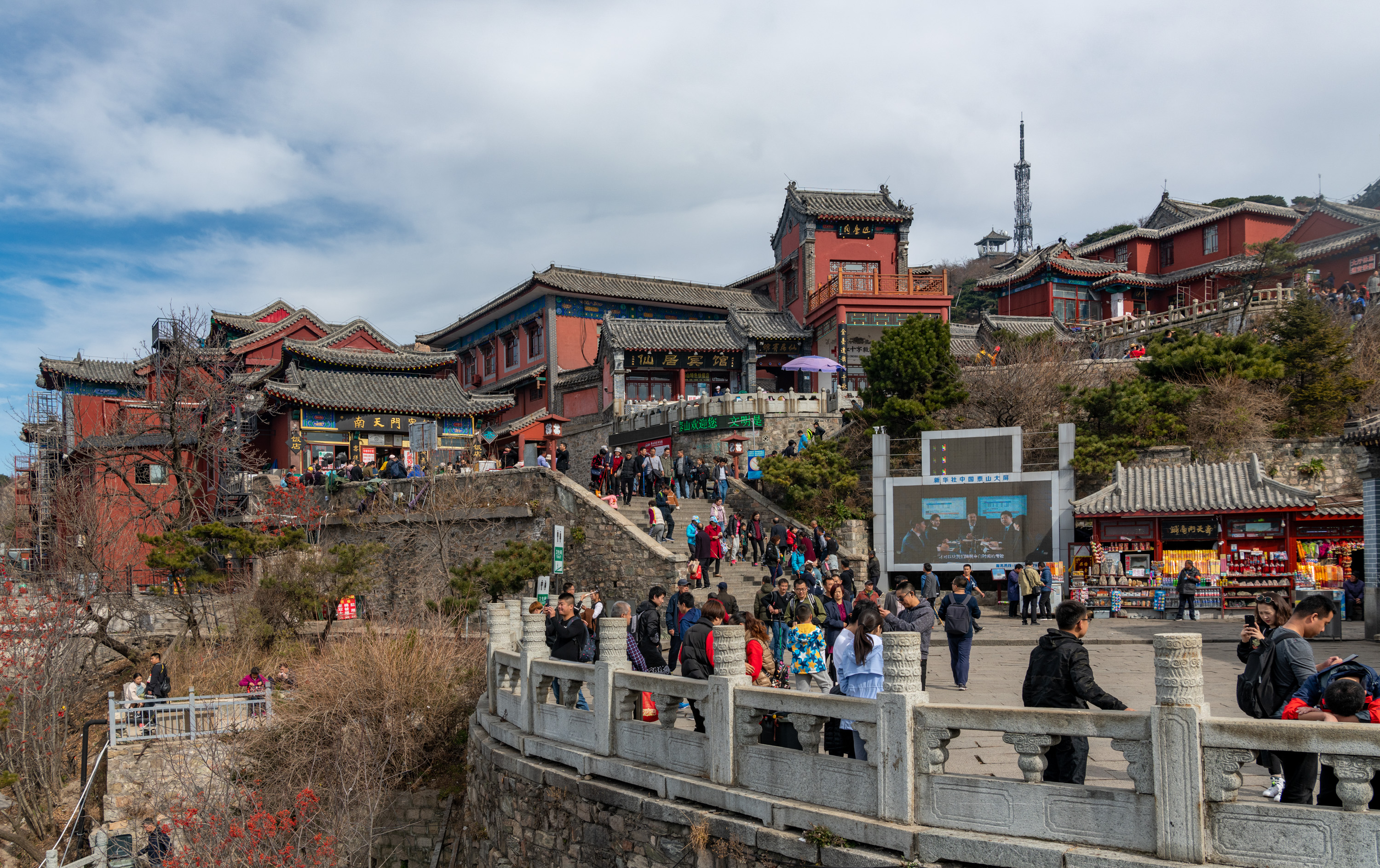
Temple complex at the top of Mount Tai

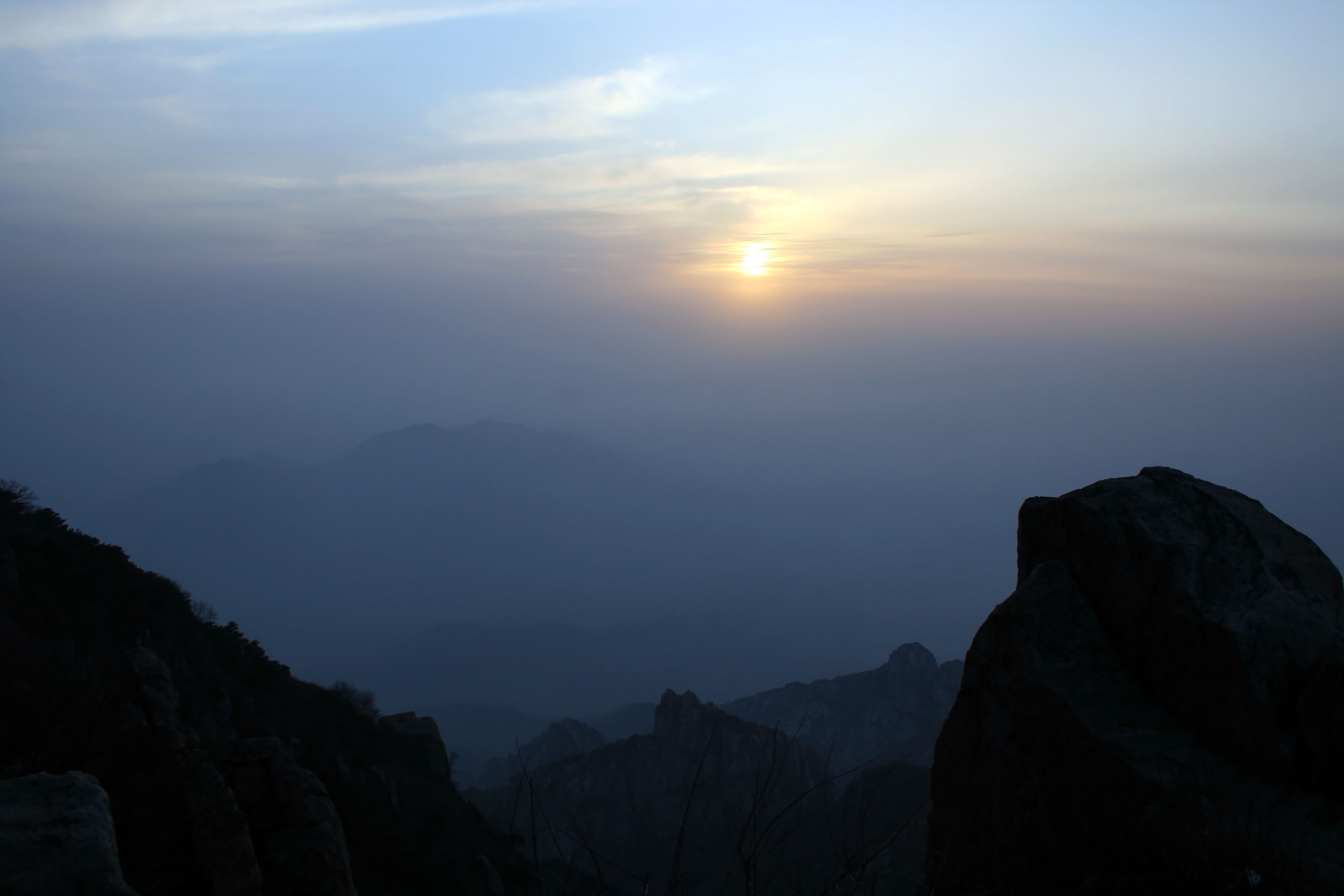
Sunrise viewed from Lu Viewing Platform

Mount Tai is of key importance in Chinese religion, being the easternmost of the five Sacred Mountains of China. According to historical records, Mount Tai became a sacred place visited by emperors to offer sacrifices and meditate in the Zhou dynasty sometime before 1000 BC. A total of 72 emperors were recorded as visiting it. Legend holds that Emperor Shun began the tradition of imperial visits to Mount Tai.

Writers also came to acquire inspiration, to compose poems, write essays, paint and take pictures. Hence, a great many cultural relics were left on the mountain.

=== Deities associated with Mount Tai ===
==== Great Deity of Mount Tai ====
The Dongyue Emperor (Chinese: 東嶽大帝; pinyin: Dōngyuè Dàdì) is the supreme god of Mount Tai. According to one mythological tradition, he is a descendant of Pangu. According to other theologies, he is the eastern one of the Five Manifestations of the Highest Deity (Wufang Shangdi).

==== Bixia Yuanjun ====
Bixia Yuanjun (Chinese: 碧霞元君; pinyin: Bìxiá Yuánjūn), literally the "Goddess of the Blue Dawn", also known as the "Heavenly Immortal Lady of Jade" (Chinese: 天仙玉女; pinyin: Tiānxian Yùnǚ) or the "Lady of Mount Tai" (Chinese: 泰山娘娘; pinyin: Tàishān Niangniang). According to some mythological accounts, she is the daughter or the consort of the Great Deity of Mount Tai. Statues of Bixia Yuanjun often depict her holding a tablet with the Big Dipper as a symbol of her authority.

==== Yanguang Niangniang ====
Yanguang Niangniang (Chinese: 阳光娘娘; pinyin: Yǎnguāng Niangniang) is venerated as a goddess of eyesight and often portrayed as an attendant to Bixia Yuanjun.

==== Songzi Niangniang ====
Songzi Niangniang (Chinese: 送子娘娘; pinyin: Sòngzi Niangniang) is seen as a goddess of fertility; like Yanguang Nainai, she is often portrayed as an attendant to Bixia Yuanjun.

==== Shi Gandang ====
Shi Gandang (Chinese: 石敢当; pinyin: Shígǎndāng) is a spirit sent down from Mount Tai by Bixia Yuanjun to protect ordinary people from evil spirits. As part of cultural tradition, there will also often be Taishan Shi Gandang stones set up near buildings and other places, in order to protect those place from evil spirits. These are not to be confused with spirit tablets.

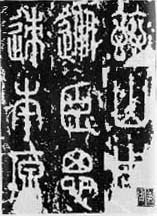
The Mount Tai Tablet by Li Si, created during Qin Shi Huang's eastern tour, laid the foundation for the seal script style of Chinese calligraphy.

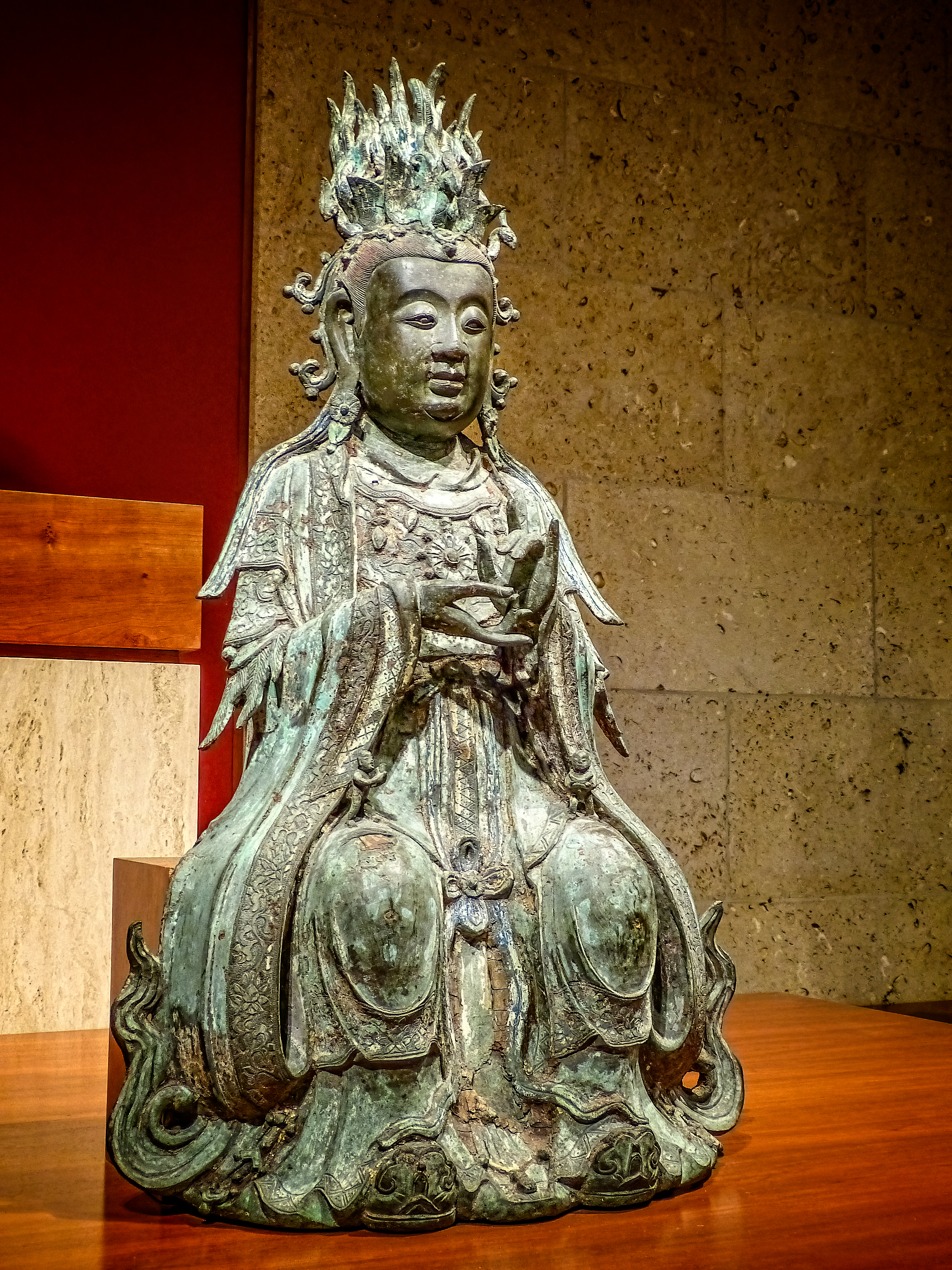
A Ming dynasty statue of Bixia Yuanjun, AIC, Chicago, United States

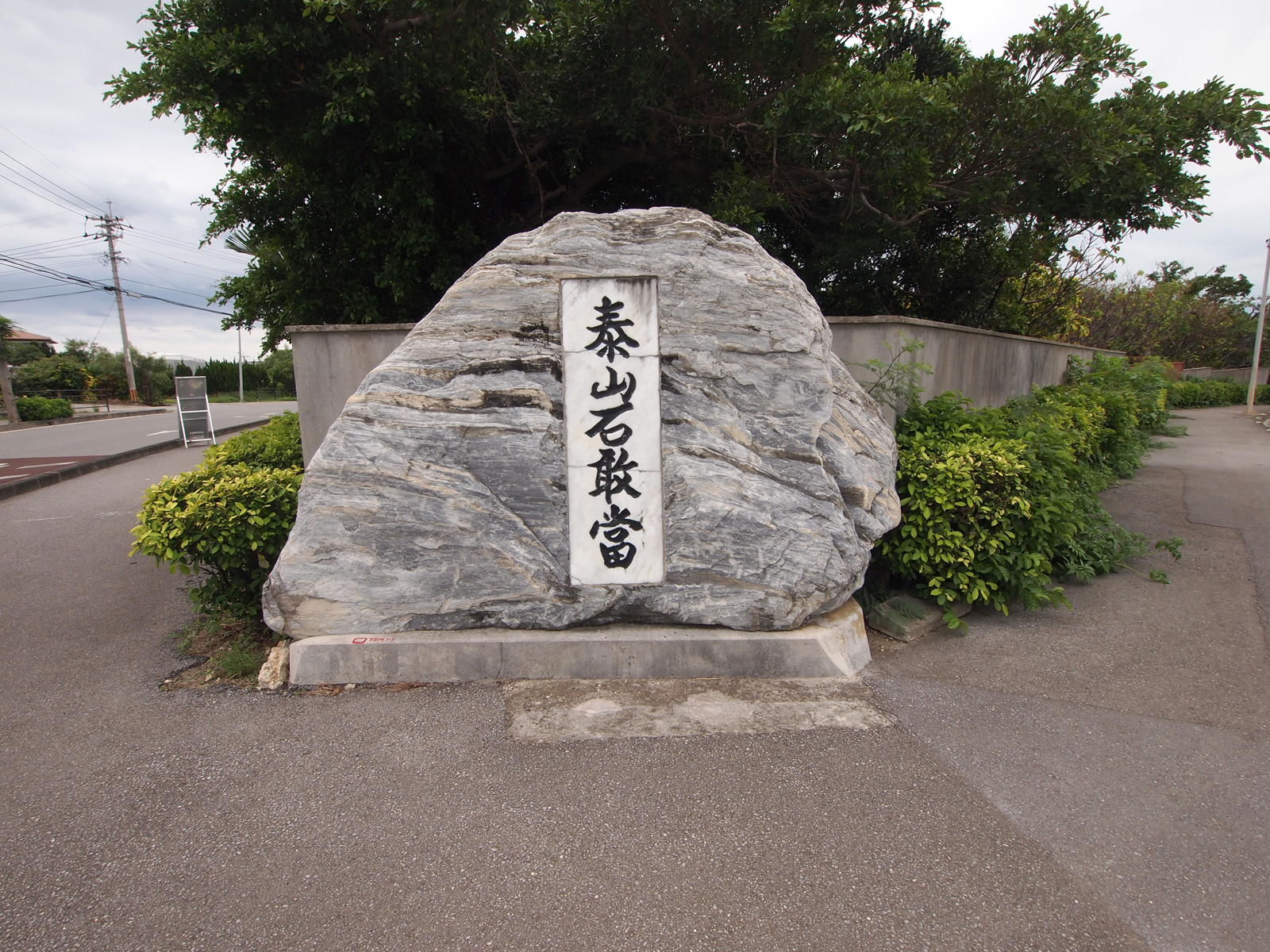
A stone carved with inscripts "Mount Tai Shigandang" in Ishigaki, Okinawa

=== Dai Miao ===
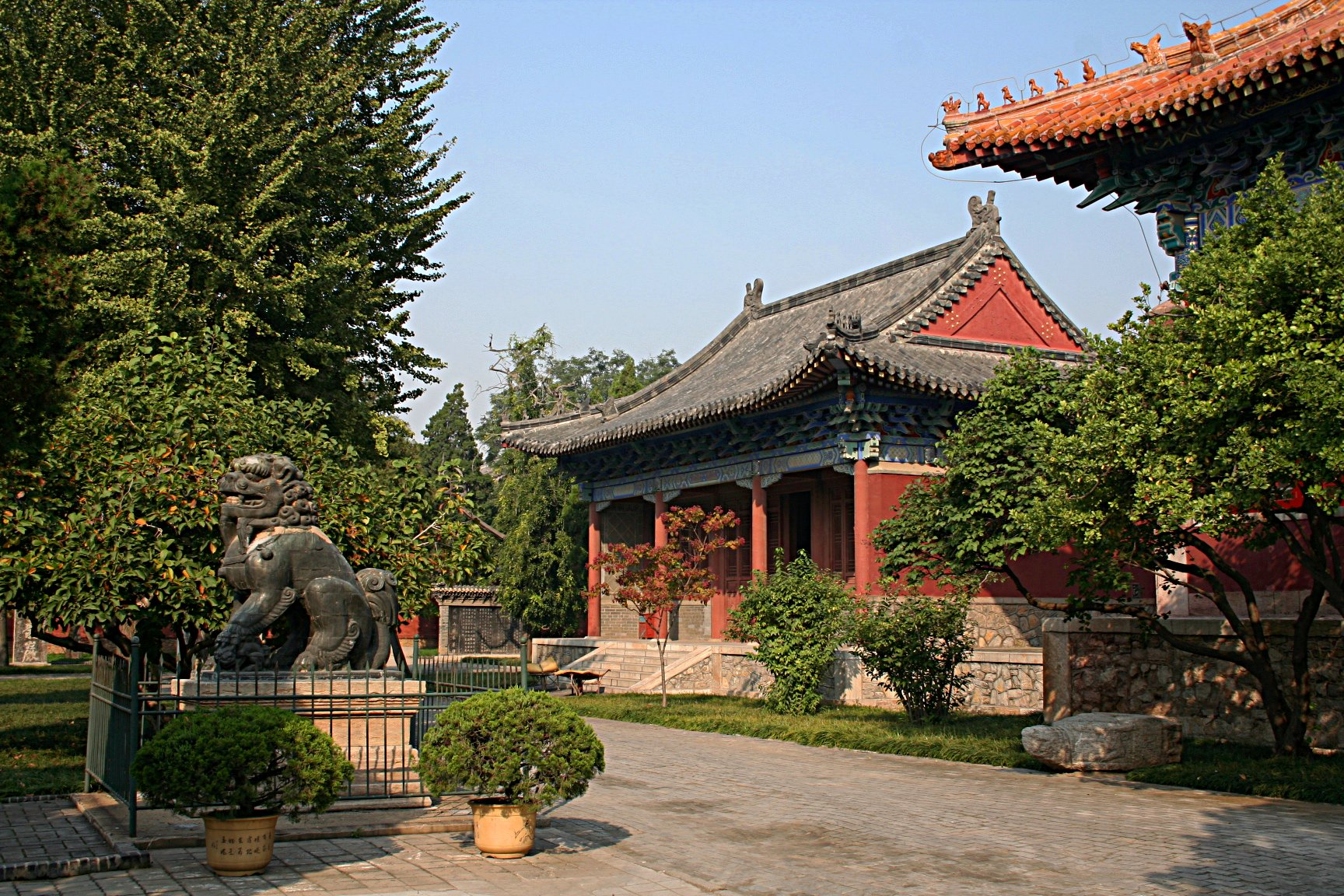
Dai Temple at Mount Tai

The Temple of the God of Mount Tai, known as the Dai Temple (Chinese: 岱庙; pinyin: Dàimiào), is the largest and most complete ancient building complex in the area. It is located at the foot of Mount Tai in the city of Tai'an and covers an area of 96,000 square meters. The temple was first built during the Qin dynasty. Since the time of the Han dynasty (206 BC – 220 AD), its design has been a replica of the imperial palace, which makes it one out of three extant structures in China with the features of an imperial palace (the other two are the Forbidden City and the Confucius Temple in Qufu). The temple has five major halls and many small buildings. The centerpiece is the Palace of Heavenly Blessings (Tian Kuang) temple hall. It was built during the Song dynasty after imperial fong sacrifices dating back to the Han were discontinued in 1008 AD, while a rammed earth wall originally built in 1162 was rebuilt in stone from 1511 to 1553 during the Ming dynasty. The temple was renovated during the reign of the last Northern Song emperor, Huizong. The hall houses the mural painting "The God of Mount Tai Making a Journey", dated to the year 1009. The mural extends around the eastern, western and northern walls of the hall and is 3.3 meters (11 ft) high and 62 meters (203 ft) long. The theme of the painting is an inspection tour by the god. Next to the Palace of Heavenly Blessings stand the Yaocan Pavilion and the entrance archway as well as the Bronze Pavilion in the northeast corner. The Dai Temple is surrounded by 2,100‑year‑old cypresses that date back to the Han dynasty. The oldest surviving stair may be the 6,000 granite steps to the top of the mountain.

The site contains a number of well-preserved steles from the Huizong reign, some of which are mounted on bixi tortoises. There is a much later, Qianlong era bixi-mounted stele as well.

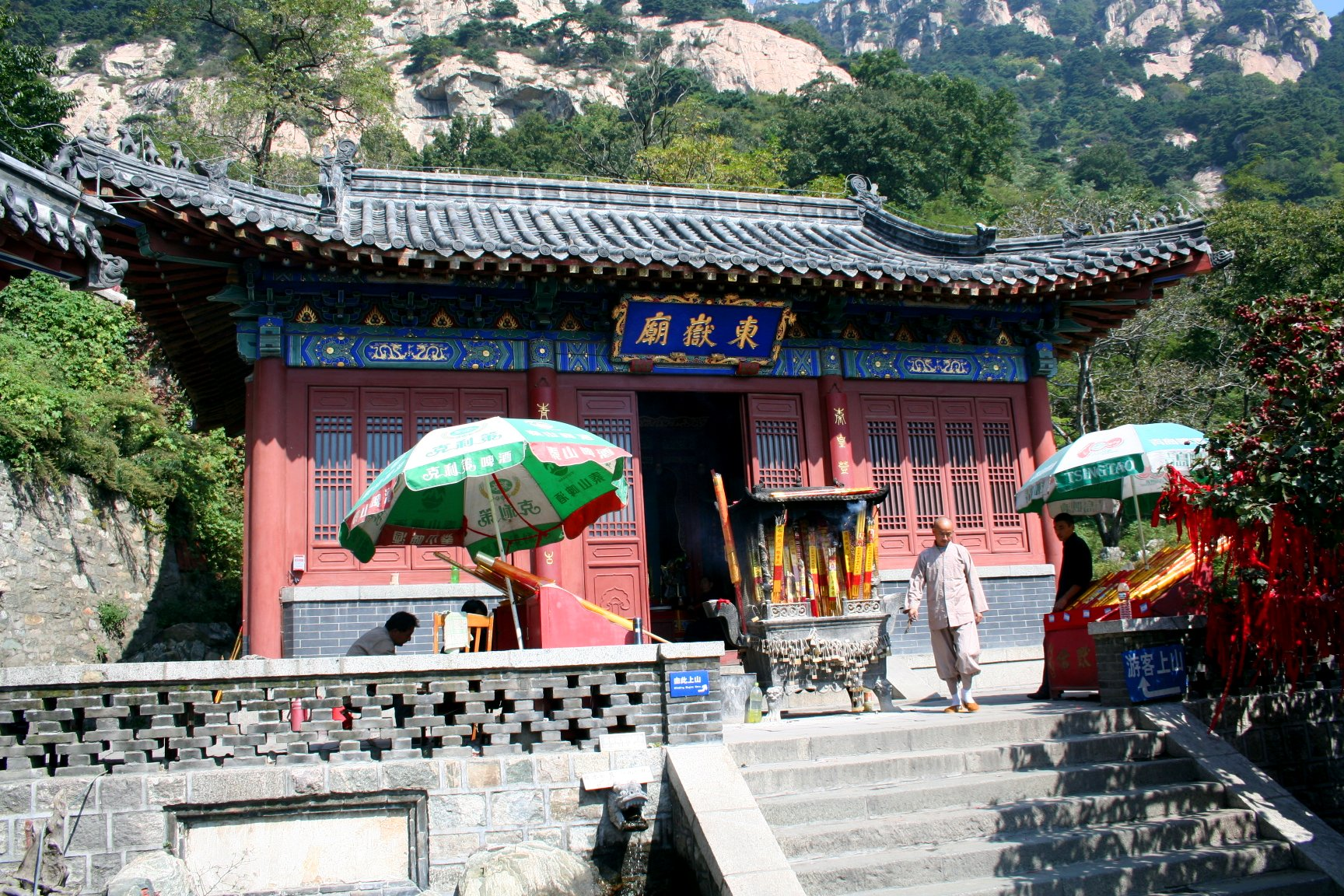
Dongyue Temple at Mount Tai

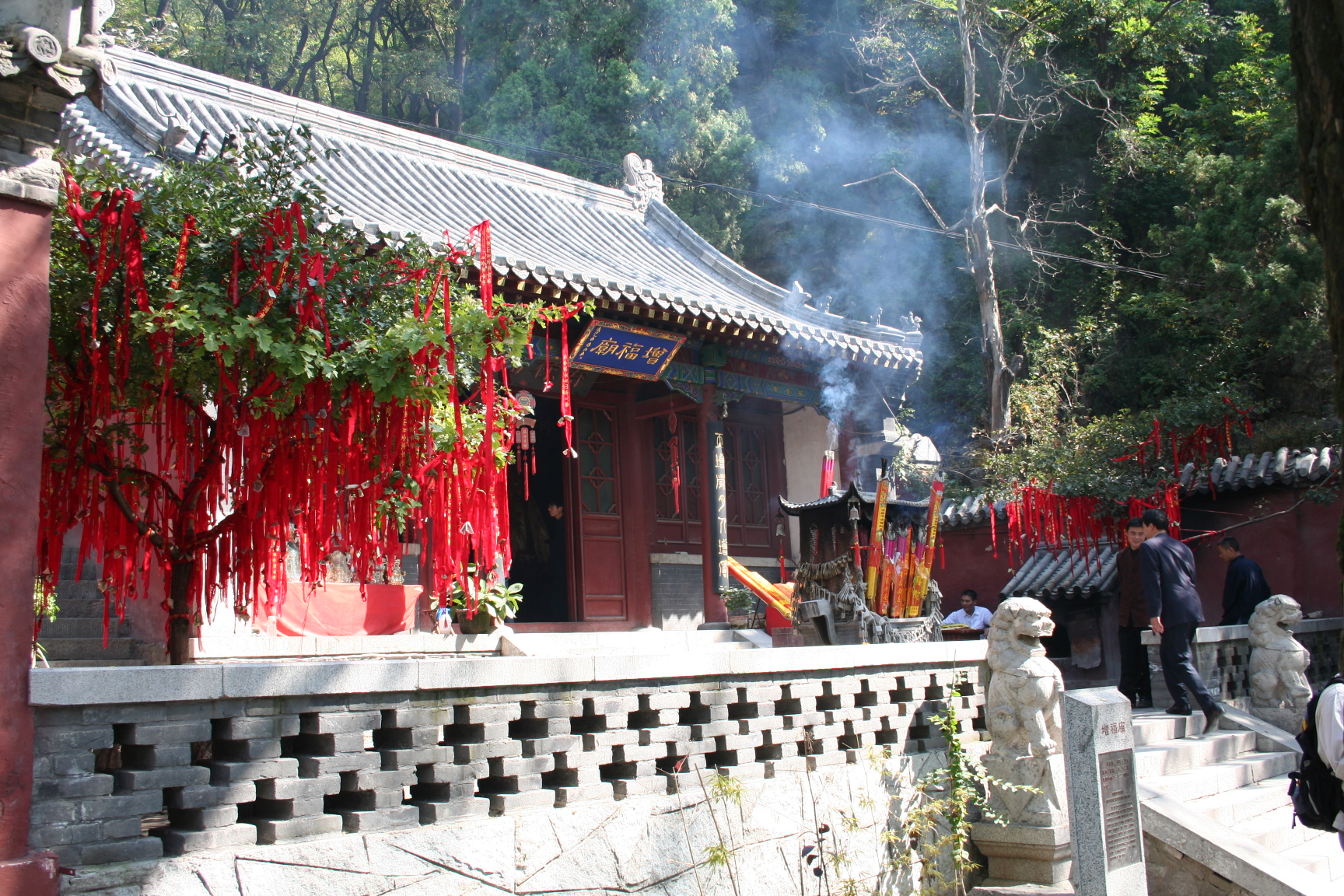
Zengfu Temple at Mount Tai

=== Shrine of the Blue Dawn ===
The Shrine of the Blue Dawn (Chinese: 碧霞祠; pinyin: Bìxiá Cí), near the top of the mountain is another grand building complex, a special combination of metal components, wood, and bricks and stone structures. It is dedicated to the goddess Bixia (Blue Dawn). From the Taishan Temple to the Blue Dawn Temple there are numerous stone tablets and inscriptions and ancient buildings on the way. Visitors derive much pleasure from climbing Mount Taishan. From the red gate at the foot of the mountain to the South Heaven Gate at the top are some 6,660 stone steps, which wind their way up the mountain slopes, each step offering a different view.

=== Shibapan ===
The "Shibapan" (十八盘) means 18 levels stairs, which is the most advantageous part of stairs in Mount Tai. A total of 1,827 stone steps, is one of the main signs Mount Tai. People always say: "Mount Tai of the majestic, all in Shibapan, Mount Tai of the sublime, all in the climb in!" Shibapan has three parts, the "Slow Eighteens"(慢十八), the "Hard Eighteens"(紧十八), and the "No slow no hard Eighteens" (不紧不慢又十八). The "Slow Eighteens" means this period is easier to climb, and the "Hard Eighteens" means it is harder to climb, which is interesting.

=== Other monuments ===
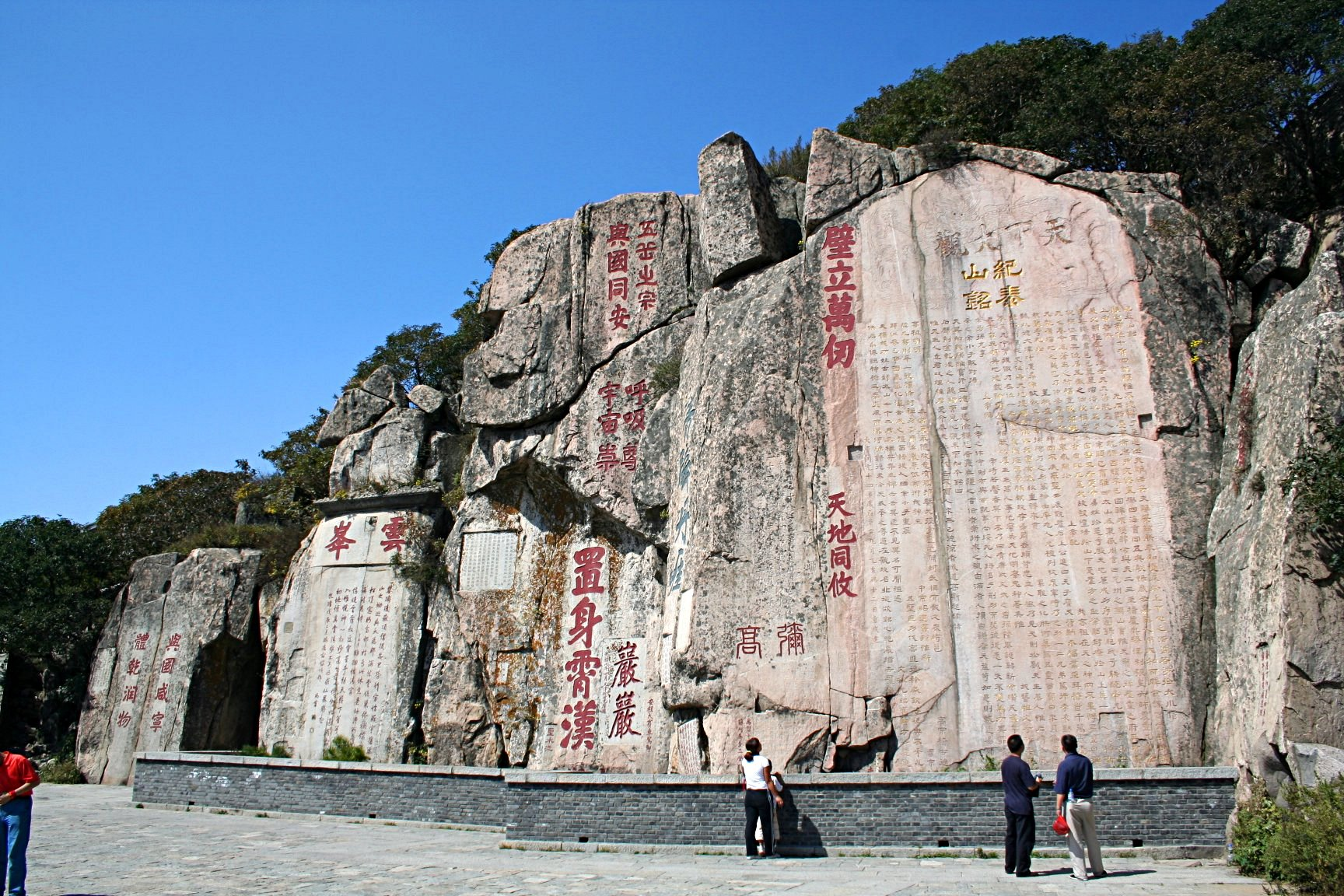
Rock inscriptions at Mount Tai

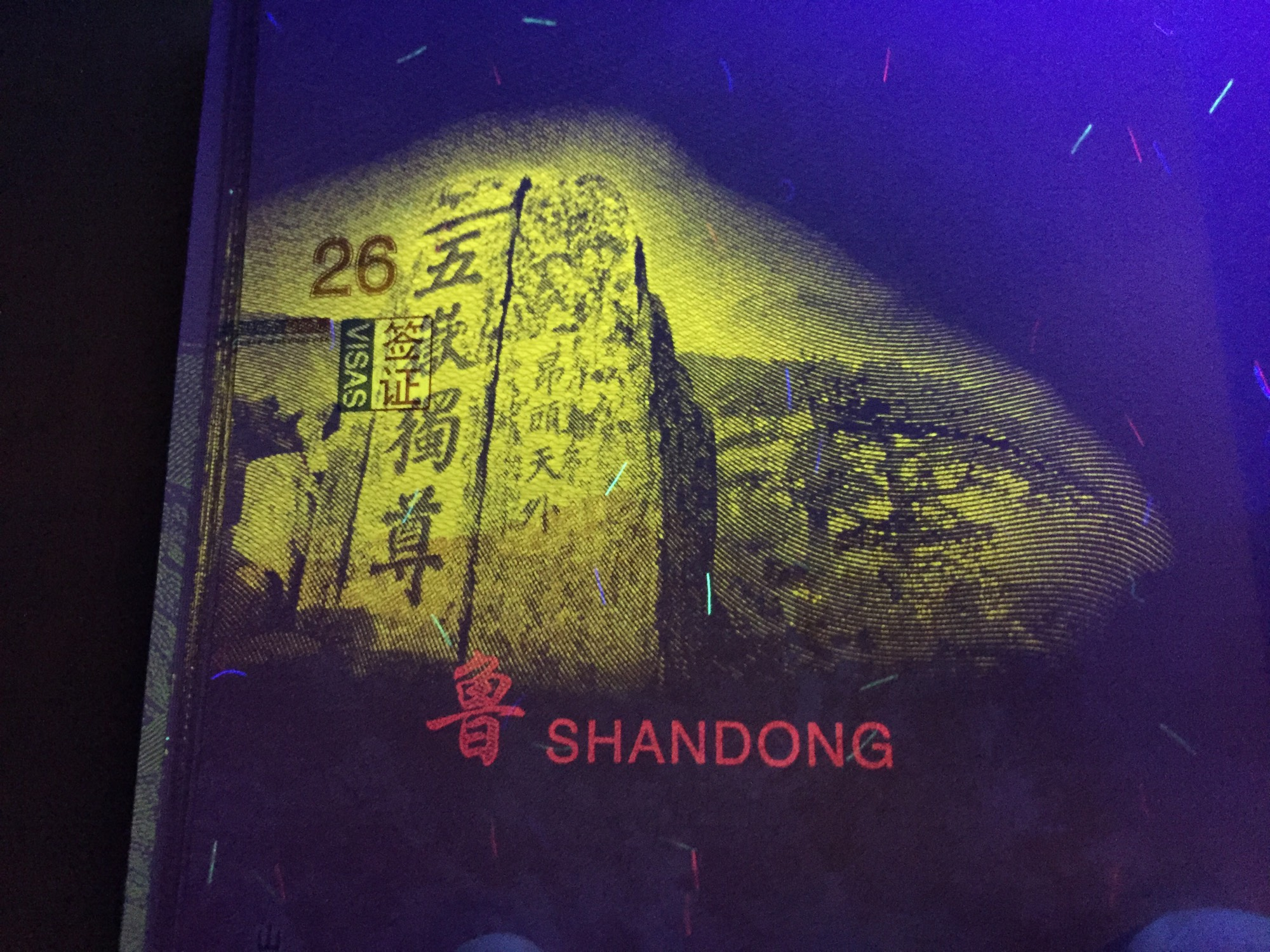
Page 26 of Chinese passport under blacklight, showing 五嶽獨尊

A flight of 7,200 total steps (including inner temple steps), with 6,293 Official Mountain Walkway Steps, lead up the East Peak of Mount Tai, along its course, there are 11 gates, 14 archways, 14 kiosks, and four pavilions.

In total, there are 22 temples, 97 ruins, 819 stone tablets, and 1,018 cliff-side and stone inscriptions located on Mount Tai. These include a Temple of the Jade King (Chinese: 玉皇庙; pinyin: Yùhuáng Miào), a Temple of the Blue Deity (Chinese: 青帝宫; pinyin: Qīngdì Gōng), a Temple of Confucius (Chinese: 孔子庙; pinyin: Kǒngzi Miào), a Temple of Doumu (Chinese: 斗母宫; pinyin: Dòumǔ Gōng) and the Puzhao Buddhist Temple (Chinese: 普照寺; pinyin: Pǔzhào Sì).

Among the tablets and inscriptions on the top of Mount Tai, the inscription that declares Mount Tai the "Most Revered of the Five Sacred Mountains" (simplified Chinese: 五岳独尊; traditional Chinese: 五嶽獨尊; pinyin: Wǔyuè Dúzūn) on the "Sun Viewing Peak" (Chinese: 日观峰; pinyin: Rìguān Fēng) is of particular renown. It was written by a member of the Aisin Gioro clan (Chinese: 爱新觉罗玉构; pinyin: Àixīn Juéluō Yùgòu) in 1907 and is featured on the reverse side of the five yuan bill of the 5th series renminbi banknotes and page 26 of PRC biometric passport. Another inscription marks the "Lu-Viewing Platform" (Chinese: 瞻鲁台; pinyin: Zhānlǔ tái) from which Confucius took in the view over his home state of Lu and then pronounced "The world is small".

The Wordless Stele (Chinese: 无字碑; pinyin: Wúzì Bēi) stands in front of the Jade Emperor Temple. Legend has it that the emperor who commissioned the stele was dissatisfied with the inscription suggested by his scribes and decided to leave it blank instead to leave its meaning to be imagined by the viewer. Another theory is that weather eroded the original calligraphic inscription.

=== Other significant places ===
- Suicide Cliff (Chinese: 舍身崖; pinyin: Shěshēn Yá), renamed Loving Life Cliff (Chinese: 爱身崖; pinyin: Àishēn Yá) in the Ming dynasty
- Sun-Viewing Peak (Chinese: 日观峰; pinyin: Rìguān Fēng)
- Moon-Viewing Peak (Chinese: 月观峰; pinyin: Yuèguān Fēng)
- Platform of Gazing over Lu (Chinese: 瞻鲁台; pinyin: Zhānlǔ Tái)
- Rock of Exploring the Sea (of Clouds) (Chinese: 探海石; pinyin: Tànhǎi Shí)

== Infrastructure ==
Visitors can reach the peak of Mount Tai via a bus which terminates at the Midway Gate to Heaven, from there a cable car connects to the summit. Covering the same distance on foot takes from two and a half to six hours. The supplies for the many vendors along the road to the summit are carried up by porters either from the Midway Gate to Heaven or all the way up from the foot of the mountain.

To climb up the mountain, one can take one of two routes. The more popular east route starts from Taishan Arch. On the way up the 7,200 stone steps, the climber first passes the Ten Thousand Immortals Tower (Wanxianlou), Arhat Cliff (Luohanya), and Palace to Goddess Dou Mu (Doumugong). The climbing from the First Gate to Heaven (yi1 tian1 men2), the main entrance bordering on Tai'an town, up the entire mountain can take two and a half hours for the sprinting hiker to six hours for the leisure pace. Reaching the Midway Gate to Heaven from First Gate to Heaven is one hour at a sprint up to two and a half hours leisurely. To the northeast of the Palace to Goddess Dou Mu is Sutra Rock Valley in which the Buddhist Diamond Sutra was cut in characters measuring fifty centimeters across believed to be inscribed in the Northern Qi dynasty. The west route, taken by fewer tourists, is more scenic, but has less cultural heritage.

== Cultural references ==
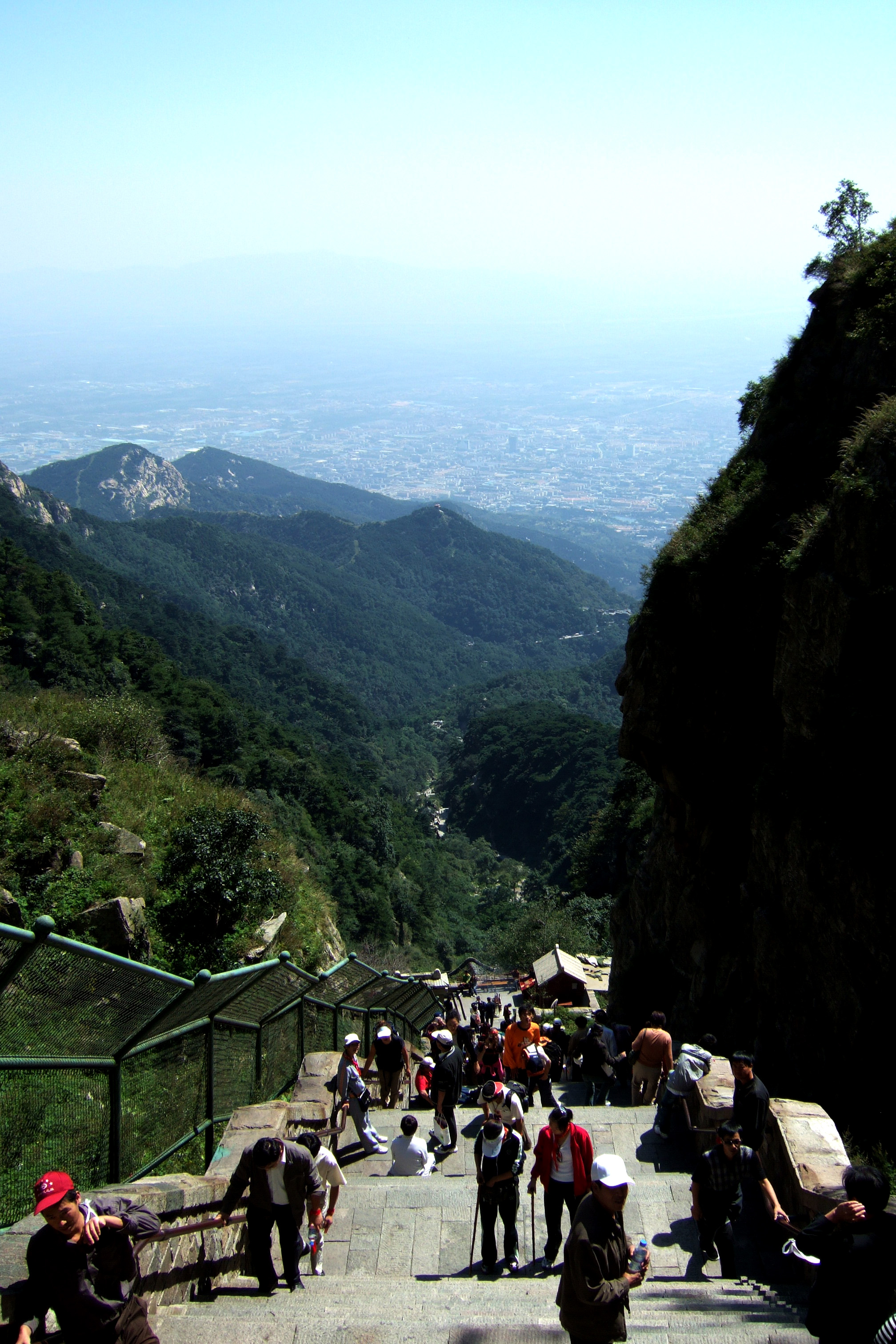
Climbing Mount Tai

- In the Zhuangzi, the Qiwulun ("Equalizing Assessments of Things") says, "Nothing in the world is larger than the tip of a hair in autumn, and Mt. Tai is small."
- In the novel Jin Ping Mei, the Moon Lady makes a pilgrimage to T'ai Shan: "... they came to the Golden Palace of Niang-niang. There was a red sign over the entrance with these words emblazoned in gold upon it: 'The Palace of Radiant Sunset.' They went inside and gazed upon the figure of Niang-niang."
- The Chinese idiom "Mount Tai & Big Dipper" (Chinese: 泰山北斗; pinyin: Tàishān Běidǒu) is an epithet for a person of great distinction.
- The Chinese idiom "有眼不识泰山" (literal translation Has eyes but doesn't recognize Mount Tai) refers to an ignorant yet arrogant person.
- The Chinese idiom "稳如泰山" (literal translation Stable as Mount Tai) is used to describe an entity that is very safe or firm.
- According to ancient historian Sima Qian, he said "Though death befalls all men alike, it may be weightier than Mount Tai or lighter than a feather." Mao Zedong referred to this passage in his 1944 speech Serve the People: "To die for the people is weightier than Mount Tai, but to work for the fascists and die for the exploiters and oppressors is lighter than a feather."
- Deng Xiaoping incorporated Mount Tai into his political rhetoric supporting Reform and Opening Up. Deng told other top leadership, "We have to strengthen ideological and political work and stress the need for hard struggle, we cannot depend on those measures alone. No matter how the international situation changes, so long as we can ensure appropriate economic growth, we shall stand as firm as Mount Tai".
- Taishan (Mount Tai) is the subject of a poem by the Tang dynasty poet Du Fu, View of Taishan
- Taishan (Mount Tai) is referenced extensively in Ezra Pound's "The Cantos," especially the Pisan Cantos.
- Mount Tai is one of the three sacred mountains, along with Mount Meru and Mount Emei, that the Gold and Silver-Horned demons crush Sun Wukong under
- Mount Tai is shown on the reverse side of the five yuan bill of the 5th series renminbi banknotes.
- The 1987 album Hold Your Fire by Canadian progressive rock band Rush contained the song "Tai Shan", referencing drummer/lyricist Neil Peart's journey to Mount Tai.
- The Dai Miao is featured in Sid Meier's Civilization IV as a religious complex that can be built by a Great Prophet, thus establishing a holy shrine dedicated to Taoism in the Taoist holy city.
- Tai Shan, some of its temples, and the Jade Emperor are referenced and visited in Dan Simmons's book The Rise of Endymion.
- Mt. Tai is referenced as being the place of origin for the Taizan Tenrōken (泰山天狼拳; "Mt. Tai Celestial Wolf Fist") martial art in Fist of the North Star, used by Yuria's elder brother, Ryuga.
- Mount Tai is the namesake of Mons Tai, located nearby an area on the far side of the Moon where Chang'e 4 landed.
- Significant scenes from the novel Ball Lightning by Cixin Liu take place on Mount Tai, which he depicts as a site of frequent thunderstorms and meteorological research.
- Cargo vessel MV Taishan (1986–2016) was named after Mount Tai.
- Zhang Zongchang, Warlord-Era controller of Shandong province, wrote a poem referencing Mount Tai.
- Mount Tai is referenced in the lyrics of 'The Year of The Boomerang' released in 1995 by Rage Against the Machine: "So I'm goin' out heavy sorta like Mount Tai."

== See also ==
- List of World Heritage Sites in China
- List of ultras of Tibet, East Asia and neighbouring areas
- Dongyue Emperor
- Four Mountains
