= Taizé (disambiguation) =

The Taizé Community is a monastic order in Taizé, Saône-et-Loire, France.

Taizé may also refer to:

- Taizé, Saône-et-Loire in the Saône-et-Loire département, France
- Taizé-Aizie, in the Charente département, France
- Taizé-Maulais, in the Deux-Sèvres département, France
- Taizé - Music of Unity and Peace, a 2015 studio album by the Taizé Community
- 100033 Taizé, an asteroid

== See also ==
- Taze (disambiguation)
