= Taylor (given name) =

- Pronunciation: /ˈteɪlər/ TAY-lər
- Gender: Unisex

Origin
- Origin: English
- Meaning: "tailor"

Other names
- Related names: Tayla, Taylah, Tyler

Taylor is a unisex given name mainly in use in English-speaking countries and especially in the United States. Variants include Tayla and Taylah; both are feminine and most popular in Australia and New Zealand, whose non-rhotic accents mean that they are pronounced the same as "Taylor".

== People ==
=== Female ===
- Taylor Anderson (curler) (born 1995), American curler
- Taylor Beck (model), American model and actress
- Taylor Brown (attorney), American attorney and government official
- Taylor Cassidy, African American educator and TikToker
- Taylor Cole (born 1984), American actress and former fashion model
- Taylor Dayne, stage name of Leslie Wunderman (born 1962), American singer-songwriter and actress
- Taylor Felt (born 2001), American singer-songwriter
- Taylor Gayle Rutherfurd (born 2004), American singer, known professionally as Gayle
- Taylor Girard (born 1998), American ice hockey player
- Taylor Fox (born 2000), American ice hockey player
- Taylor Hill (sprinter) (born 1996), British Virgin Islander sprinter
- Taylor Hill (model) (born 1996), American model
- Taylor House (born 1998), American ice hockey player
- Taylor Ibera (born 1991), American judoka and wrestler
- Taylor Jardine (born 1990), American singer and songwriter
- Taylor Johnson (tennis) (born 2000), American tennis player
- Taylor Jenkins Reid (born 1983), American novelist
- Taylor Lorenz, American journalist
- Taylor Mikesell (born 1999), American basketball player
- Taylor Momsen (born 1993), American singer-songwriter and model
- Taylor Ortlepp (born 1997), Australian basketball player and footballer
- Taylor Russell (born 1994), Canadian actress
- Taylor Schilling (born 1984), American actress
- Taylor Shumaker (born 2006), American softball player
- Taylor Small (born 1994), American politician
- Taylor Soule (born 2000), American basketball player
- Taylor Swift (born 1989), American singer-songwriter
- Taylor Thierry (born 2002), American basketball player
- Taylor Tomlinson (born 1993), American comedian
- Taylor Wilde, stage name of Shantelle Malawski (born 1986), American professional wrestler
- Taylor Winterstein (born 1989) Samoan-Australian online-influencer and anti-vaxxer
- Taylor Vancil (born 1991), retired American soccer player
- Tayla Alexander (born 2000), New Zealand singer
- Tayla Bresland (born 1996), Australian rules football player
- Tayla Carolina Pereira dos Santos (born 1992), Brazilian footballer
- Tayla Ford (born 1993), New Zealand Olympic wrestler
- Tayla Harris (born 1997), Australian rules football player
- Tayla Parx (born 1993), American singer-songwriter and actress
- Tayla Peres (born 1991), Brazilian politician
- Tayla Roberts (born 1993), Australian basketball player
- Tayla Thorn (born 1998), Australian rules football player

=== Male ===
- Taylor Adams (born 1993), Australian football player
- Taylor Anderson (author), American author, gunsmith, re-enactor, and history professor
- Taylor Antrim (born 1974), American writer and editor
- Taylor Beck (born 1991), Canadian ice hockey player
- Taylor Bennett (born 1985), American politician and college football player
- Taylor Bennett (born 1996), American hip hop artist
- Taylor Bertolet (born 1992), American football player
- Taylor Booth (1933–1986), American mathematician
- Taylor Branch (born 1947), American author and historian
- Taylor Britt (born 1996), New Zealand basketball player
- Taylor G. Brown (1890–1957), American politician
- Taylor Buchholz (born 1981), American baseball player
- Taylor Chace (born 1986), American sledge hockey player
- Taylor Clarke (born 1993), American baseball player
- Taylor Cornelius (born 1995), American football player
- Taylor Decker (born 1993), American football player
- Taylor Dent (born 1981), American tennis player
- Taylor Deupree (born 1971), American musician, photographer, and graphic designer
- Taylor Douthit (1901–1986), American baseball player
- Taylor Duncan (1953–2004), American baseball player
- Taylor Eigsti (born 1984), American jazz pianist and composer
- Taylor Elgersma (born 2002), Canadian American football player
- Taylor Fletcher (born 1990), American Nordic combined skier
- Taylor Fritz (born 1997), American tennis player
- Taylor Gabriel (born 1991), American football player
- Taylor Gold (born 1993), American Olympic snowboarder
- Taylor Graham (born 1980), American soccer player
- Taylor Griffin (born 1986), American basketball player
- Taylor Guerrieri (born 1992), American baseball player
- Taylor Gushue (born 1993), American baseball player
- Taylor Hall (born 1991), Canadian ice hockey player
- Taylor Hall (born 1964), Canadian ice hockey player
- Taylor Hanson (born 1983), American musician, Hanson
- Taylor Hawkins (1972–2022), American musician, Foo Fighters
- Taylor Hearn (born 1996), American football player
- Taylor Hearn (born 1994), American baseball player
- Taylor Heinicke (born 1993), American football quarterback
- Taylor Hendricks (born 2003), American basketball player
- Taylor Hicks (born 1976), American singer, winner of American Idol
- Taylor Hill (born 1989), American baseball pitcher
- Taylor Jacobs (born 1981), American football player
- Taylor Jensen (born 1984), American longboard surfrider
- Taylor Jones (born 1993), American baseball player
- Taylor Jordan (born 1989), American baseball player
- Taylor Jungmann (born 1989), American baseball player
- Taylor Kemp (born 1990), American soccer player
- Taylor Kerr (born 2006), English rugby league player
- Taylor King (born 1988), American basketball player
- Taylor Kinney (born 1981), American actor and model
- Taylor Kitsch (born 1981), Canadian actor and model
- Taylor Knox (born 1971), American surfer
- Taylor Lautner (born 1992), American actor
- Taylor Mays (born 1988), American football player
- Taylor McWilliams (born 1980/1981), American real estate developer
- Taylor Moton (born 1994), American football player
- Taylor Motter (born 1989), American baseball player
- Taylor Negron (1957–2015), American actor, comedian, painter, and playwright
- Taylor Rapp (born 1997), American football player
- Taylor I. Record (1846–1912), American politician
- Taylor Reed (born 1991), American football player
- Taylor Rochestie (born 1985) American basketball player
- Taylor Rogers (born 1990), American baseball player
- Taylor Russolino (born 1989), American football player
- Taylor Stallworth (born 1995), American football player
- Taylor Trammell (born 1997), American baseball player
- Taylor Wang (born 1940), Chinese-American scientist
- Taylor Walker (born 1990), Australian rules footballer
- Taylor Walls (born 1996), American baseball player
- Taylor Ward (born 1993), American baseball player
- Taylor Weyeneth (born 1993), American Deputy Chief of Staff for the Office of National Drug Control Policy
- Taylor Widener (born 1994), American baseball player
- Taylor Williams (born 1991), American baseball player
- Taylor Wilson (born 1994), American nuclear scientist
- Taylor Wily (1968–2024), American actor, sumo wrestler and mixed martial artist
- Taylor Wong (1950–2025), Hong Kong film director
- Taylor York (born 1989), American musician, Paramore
- Taylor Zakhar Perez (born 1991), American actor

== Fictional characters ==
- Taylor Earhardt, Yellow Ranger in the TV series Power Rangers: Wild Force
- Taylor Hayes, character in the American soap opera The Bold and the Beautiful
- Taylor Hebert, main protagonist of the web series Worm
- Taylor McKessie, character in the High School Musical film series
- Taylor Townsend (The O.C.), character in the American television series The O.C.

== See also ==
- Taylor (surname)
- Tay (nickname)
