= Thay =

Thay may refer to:

- Thầy Temple, a Buddhist temple in Hanoi, Vietnam
- Thích Nhất Hạnh (1926 – 2022), nicknamed Thầy (Vietnamese: teacher), a Vietnamese monk and peace activist
- Dalek Thay, a character in the Doctor Who TV series
- Thays, a Pakistani TV drama serial
- Thay (Forgotten Realms), a fictional magocracy ruled by the Red Wizards within the Dungeons & Dragons Forgotten Realms setting

== See also ==
- Thai (disambiguation)
- Tai (disambiguation)
- Tay (disambiguation)
- Kok Thay (disambiguation)
  - Kok Thay (given name)
