= Tay (name) =

Tay is a name used as a surname and a given name. Tay is also a nickname and sometimes a short form (hypocorism) of the given name Taylor. Tay is also an alternative form for Zheng (surname). Notable people with the name include:

== People with the surname ==
- Alaric Tay (born 1979), Singaporean director, producer and actor
- Bryan Tay, (born 1988), Singaporean swimmer
- Jacelyn Tay (born 1975), Singaporean actress
- John Tay (1832–1892), American Seventh-day Adventist missionary
- Michael Tay (born 1959), Ambassador Extraordinary and Plenipotentiary of the Republic of Singapore to the Russian Federation
- Moses Tay, 7th Bishop of Singapore and first Archbishop of the Province of Anglican Church in South East Asia
- Patrick Tay (born 1971), Singaporean politician
- Ronnie Tay (born 1963), Singaporean civil servant and former naval admiral
- Sharon Tay (born 1966), American journalist and former television host
- Simon Tay, Singaporean law professor, author and former Nominated Member of Parliament
- Waren Tay, British ophthalmologist
- Zoe Tay (born 1968), Singaporean A-List television actress
- Tay Chow Lyang, Singaporean murder victim in an unsolved double murder case that occurred in Sydney
- Tay Geok Teat (1832–1893), Chinese merchant from Singapore
- Tay Sek Tin (1872–1944), Chinese pastor who lived in Singapore
- Robert Tay Bak Hong, one of the three murder victims of the Andrew Road triple murders case in 1983
- Dawn Jacinta Tay Aishan, survivor of the Andrew Road triple murders case in 1983

== People with the given name ==
- Tay Gowan (born 1998), American football player
- Tay Za (born 1964), Burmese businessman

== People with the nickname ==
- TAY (singer) (born 1999), Portuguese singer and dancer
- Tay Zonday (born 1982), American singer, voice actor and YouTube personality
- Tay Baker, American retired college basketball player and coach (active from 1947 to 1979)
- Tay Cody (born 1977), American former National Football League and Canadian Football League player
- Tay Garnett (1894–1977), American film director and writer
- Tay Glover-Wright (born 1992), American football player
- Tay Hohoff (1898–1974), American literary editor
- Lil Tay (born 2007), American-born Canadian social media personality
- Taylor Jardine (born 1990), American singer-songwriter, lead vocalist of the pop punk band We Are the In Crowd
- Tay Melo (born 1995), Brazilian professional wrestler
- Tayshaun Prince (born 1980), American retired National Basketball Association player
- Taylor Swift (born 1989), American singer-songwriter also nicknamed Tay or Taytay
- Tawan Vihokratana (born 1991), Thai actor known as Tay
- Antabia Waller (born 1988), American professional basketball player

== See also ==
- Taytay (disambiguation)
