= Cathay (disambiguation) =

Cathay is an alternative historical name for China. It may also refer to:

== Places ==
- Cathay, California, former name of Catheys Valley, California
- Cathay, North Dakota, United States
- Cathays, a district of Cardiff, the capital of Wales
- Cathay Theatre, a historical landmark movie theatre in Shanghai

== Media ==
- Cathay (poetry collection), 1915, a book of poems by Ezra Pound
- Cathay (short story), 1982, a short story by Steven Millhauser
- Cathay (Warhammer), a fictional nation in Games Workshop's Warhammer Fantasy universe

== Other ==
- Cathay Bank, a Chinese-American bank
- Cathay de Grande, a nightclub
- Cathay Pacific, the largest airline and flag carrier of Hong Kong
- Cathay United Bank, a Taiwanese financial services company
- Cathay Life Insurance, a Taiwanese insurance company
- Cathay Organisation, a Singapore-Hong Kong film company
- The Cathay, a mixed-use 17-storey cinema, shopping mall and apartment building
- SS Cathay, a number of ships
- Cathay Williams, American soldier

== See also ==
- Guotai (disambiguation)
