= Taylor Beck =

Taylor Beck may refer to:

- Taylor Beck (ice hockey) (born 1991), Canadian ice hockey player
- Taylor Beck (model), American model and actress
