= Taze =

Taze may refer to:

- Taze, Myanmar, a town in Shwebo District, Sagaing Division, Myanmar
- Tazé, a railway station and restaurant in Indiana, Pennsylvania, US
- Della Taze, a character in the novel Wetware by Rudy Rucker
- Taze, a character in Ginga Sengoku Gun'yūden Rai
- The action of using a taser of a person or object
- Taze (rapper), British rapper

== See also ==
- Taizé (disambiguation)
- Tase (disambiguation)
- Taser, a brand of electroshock weapon
- Tays (disambiguation)
- Tazze, saucer-like dishes either mounted on a stem and foot or on a foot alone
- Teays (disambiguation)
- Tazo, a US tea distributor
