= Thai =

Thai or THAI may refer to:

- Of or from Thailand, a country in Southeast Asia.
  - Thai people, Siamese people, Central/Southern Thai people or Thai noi people, an ethnic group from Central and Southern Thailand.
  - Tanintharyi Thai, Thai minority in southern Myanmar.
  - Yodaya people, Bamar with Thai ancestry in Central Myanmar.
  - Sukhothai language, a kind of Thai topolect, by the end of the 18th century, they gradually diverged into regional variants, which subsequently developed into the modern Central Thai and Southern Thai.
    - Central Thai language or Siamese language, the sole official language in Thailand and first language of most people in Central Thailand, including Thai Chinese in Southern Thailand.
    - Southern Thai language, or Southern Siamese language, or Tambralinga language, language of Southern Thailand first language of most people in Southern Thailand
    - Thai script
    - Thai (Unicode block)
  - Thai Airways International, the national airline of Thailand
  - Thai cat, a breed of cat in Thailand

== People with the name ==
- Thai (surname), a Vietnamese version of Cai, including a list of people with the name
- Thai Lee (born 1958), an American businesswoman
- Thai Nearysocheata, a Cambodian model
- Thai Nguyen, US-based Vietnamese fashion designer and television personality

== Other uses ==
- Thai (cannabis), a name for the drug
- Thai (month), a month in the Tamil calendar
  - Thai Pongal or simply Pongal, an agricultural festival in Tamil Nadu, India celebrated during the month
- Toe to Heel Air Injection (THAI), a method of extracting oil from oil sands
- Thái people (Vietnam), an ethnic group in Vietnam

== See also ==
- Dai (disambiguation)
- Tai (disambiguation)
- Tay (disambiguation)
- Thais (disambiguation)
- Thay (disambiguation)
- Tie (disambiguation)
- Siam (disambiguation)
- Tai peoples or Thai peoples, the ethnic groups of southern China and Southeast Asia
- Thai tea or "cha-yen", a drink made from black tea
