= Tay =

Tay or TAY may refer to:

== People and languages ==
- Tay (name), including lists of people with the given name, surname and nickname
- Tay people, an ethnic group of Vietnam
- Tày language
- Atayal language, an Austronesian language spoken in Taiwan (ISO 639-3 code "tay")
- TAY (singer), Portuguese singer Tiago Amaral (born 1999)

== Places ==
=== Canada ===
- Tay, Ontario, a township
- Tay River, Ontario
- Tay Canal, a part of the river
- Tay Sound, Nunavut

=== Scotland ===
- River Tay
- Tay Bridge, a railway bridge that collapsed in 1879, killing all on board a train
- Loch Tay, a freshwater loch
- Firth of Tay, the estuary into which the Tay flows

=== Elsewhere ===
- Tay, Iran, a village
- Tay, Ardabil, a village
- Lough Tay, a lake in County Wicklow, Ireland
- Tay Head, Antarctica
- Firth of Tay (Antarctica)

== Transportation ==
- Rolls-Royce RB.44 Tay, a turbojet aircraft engine
- Rolls-Royce RB.183 Tay, a turbofan aircraft engine
- ASL Airlines Belgium, formerly TNT Airways, ICAO airline code TAY
- Tartu Airport, Estonia, IATA code TAY

== Other uses ==
- Tay (treasurer), a high official of Ancient Egypt
- HMS Tay, several Royal Navy ships
- Tay (chatbot), an AI chatbot released by Microsoft in 2016
- Radio Tay, a group of three Independent Local Radio stations in Scotland
- Tay FM
- Tay 2
- University of Tampere (Finnish: Tampereen yliopisto (Tay)), a university in Finland
- Tay, a fictional location in the video game Riven

== See also ==
- Tai (disambiguation)
- Taytay (disambiguation)
- Tays (disambiguation)
- Thay (disambiguation)
- Tayy, an ancient Arab tribe
