= Taizé - Music of Unity and Peace =

Studio album by Taizé Community
- Released: 16 March 2015
- Recorded: May and July 2014
- Venue: Romanesque Church, Taizé; Church of Reconciliation, Taizé
- Genre: choral, Christian, sacred
- Length: 67:48
- Language: Latin, French, English, Italian, German, Church Slavonic, Spanish
- Label: Deutsche Grammophon (Universal Music)
- Producer: Anna Barry

Taizé - Music of Unity and Peace is the 2015 studio album by the ecumenical Taizé Community from the eponymous village in France. It was recorded in May and July 2014, and was released in March 2015, by the Deutsche Grammophon.

== Background ==
The Taizé Community is an ecumenical monastic order in Taizé, Saône-et-Loire, Burgundy, France. It is composed of more than one hundred brothers, from Protestant and Catholic traditions, who originate from about thirty countries across the world. It was founded in 1940 by Brother Roger Schütz, who came to Taizé from Geneva. Guidelines for the community's life are contained in The Rule of Taizé written by Brother Roger and first published in French in 1954.

== Musical style ==
The music of Taizé emphasizes simple phrases, usually lines from Psalms, other pieces of Scripture, or from the liturgy, both Western and Eastern Orthodox, repeated many times and sometimes also sung in canon. Earlier Taizé community music was conceived and composed by Jacques Berthier. Later Joseph Gelineau became a major contributor to the music. More recent songs have been composed by brothers of the Community.

== Recording ==
The recording took place in May and in July 2014. Most of the chants were recorded in the Church of Reconciliation in Taizé, by a few instrumentalists and a choir composed of young people from different countries who spent a week in the Community. Several chants were recorded by brothers of the Community, in the Romanesque Church in the village of Taizé. The recording was produced by Anna Barry.

The chants on the album are sung in seven different languages: Latin, French, English, Italian, German, Church Slavonic and Spanish. The Community considers that the songs in many different languages are appropriate for large international gatherings.

== Track listing ==
No.	Title	Lyrics	Music	Length
1.	"The Bells Of Taizé"			2:13
2.	"Veni, Sancte Spiritus"	liturgical	Jacques Berthier	5:38
3.	"Introduction: Seigneur, ouvre mes lèvres"	Ps 50	Jacques Berthier	1:32
4.	"Bless the Lord"	Ps 103	Jacques Berthier	4:06
5.	"Laudate Dominum"	Ps 117,1	Jacques Berthier	3:54
6.	"Répons: Le Verbe s'est fait chair"	Jn 1,14	Taizé	2:35
7.	"Beati voi poveri"	Mt 5,3; Lk 6,20	Taizé	4:51
8.	"Jubilate, coeli (Christus)"	liturgical	Jacques Berthier	2:57
9.	"Psaume 63"	Ps 63	Joseph Gelineau	2:39
10.	"Bleibet hier"	Mk 14,34; Mt 26,36b.38.41	Jacques Berthier	5:35
11.	"In manus tuas, Pater"	Lk 23,46	Taizé	4:22
12.	"Surrexit Christus"	liturgical	Jacques Berthier	3:35
13.	"Gospodi pomiluj C"	liturgical	Russian Orthodox Liturgy	2:29
14.	"Aber du weißt den Weg für mich"	Dietrich Bonhoeffer	Taizé	3:33
15.	"Cantique de Siméon"	Lk 2, 29-32	Jacques Berthier	1:46
16.	"Jésus le Christ"	after St. Augustine	Jacques Berthier	4:27
17.	"De noche iremos"	Luis Rosales	Jacques Berthier	4:29
18.	"Ubi caritas et amor"	liturgical; 1 Jn 4,7	Jacques Berthier	3:01
19.	"Let All Who Are Thirsty Come"	Is 55,1	Taizé	4:06
Total length:				1:07:48

== Release history ==
Country	Date	Format	Label
Austria, Germany	13 March 2015	CD; digital download	Deutsche Grammophon (Universal Music)
United Kingdom	16 March 2015	CD; digital download	Deutsche Grammophon (Universal Music)
Canada	17 March 2015	CD; digital download	Deutsche Grammophon (Universal Music)
Italy	17 March 2015	CD; digital download	Deutsche Grammophon (Universal Music)
United States	17 March 2015	CD; digital download	Deutsche Grammophon (Universal Music)
Japan	17 March 2015	CD; digital download	Deutsche Grammophon (Universal Music)
