= Tase =

TASE or tase may refer to:

- Tangsa language, also Tase and Tase Naga, a Tibeto-Burman language
- Tel Aviv Stock Exchange
- To attack somebody with a Taser or electroshock weapon

== See also ==
- Taze (disambiguation)
- Tays (disambiguation)
