= Taizé Community =

French ecumenical religious order

Taizé
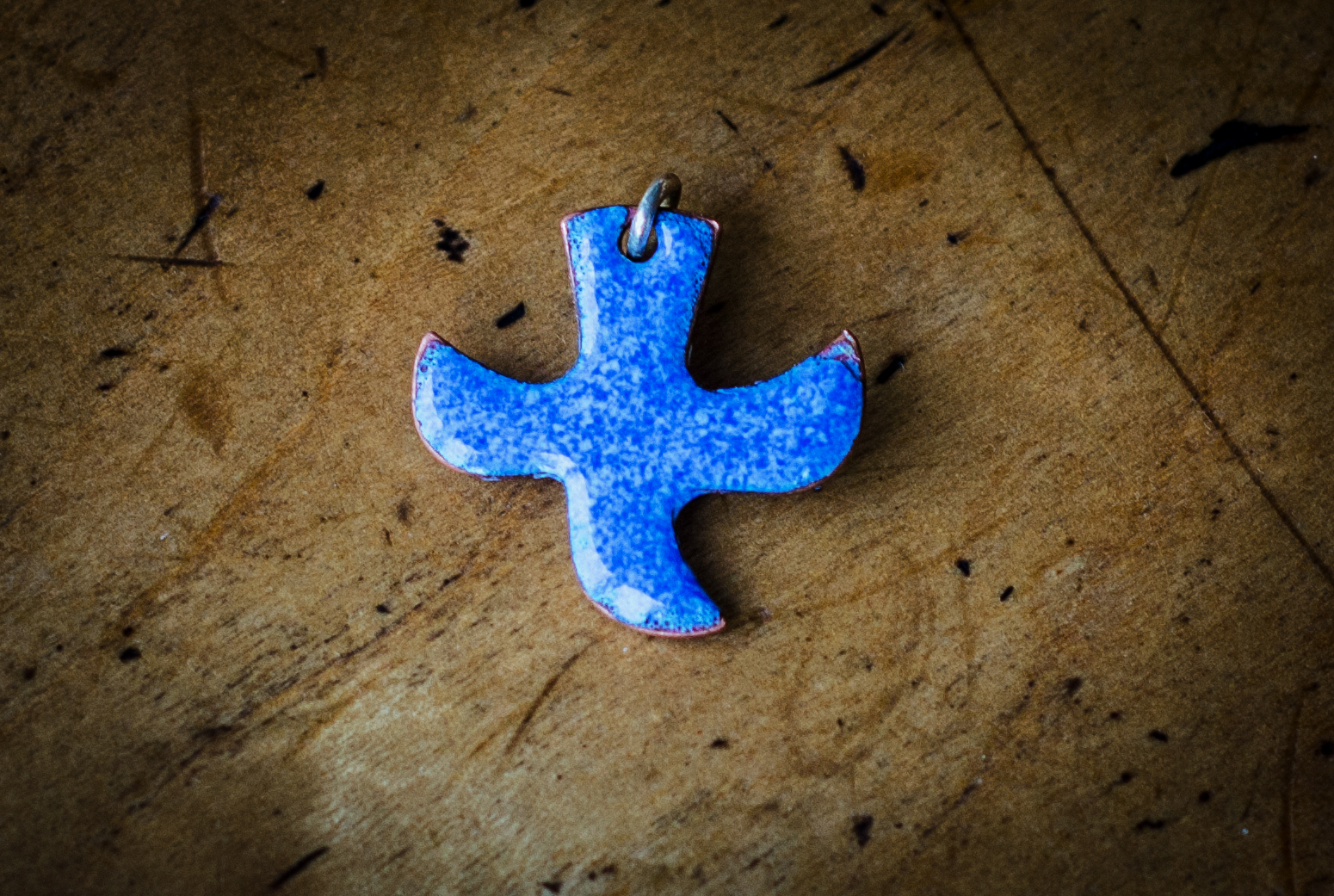
- Taizé cross
- Formation: 1940; 86 years ago
- Founder: Brother Roger Schütz
- Type: Christian monastic fraternity
- Purpose: Service to young people; promotion of ecumenism
- Headquarters: Taizé
- Location: Saône-et-Loire, Burgundy, France
- Coordinates: 46°30′49″N 4°40′37″E
- Official language: French
- Prior: Brother Matthew
- Website: www.taize.fr

The Taizé Community (French: Communauté de Taizé) is an ecumenical Christian monastic community in Taizé, Saône-et-Loire, Burgundy, France. It is composed of about one hundred brothers, from Catholic and Protestant traditions, who originate from about thirty countries around the world. It was founded in 1940 by Brother Roger Schütz, a Reformed Protestant. Guidelines for the community's life are contained in The Rule of Taizé written by Brother Roger and first published in French in 1954.

Taizé has become one of the world's most important sites of Christian pilgrimage, attracting over 100,000 young people each year for prayer, Bible study, communal work, and shared reflection. Central to its contemplative atmosphere are simple, meditative chants that support prayer and silence. Through these practices, the community fosters ecumenism and reconciliation across diverse Christian traditions. The community's church, the Church of Reconciliation, was inaugurated on 6 August 1962. It was designed by a Taizé member and architect, Brother Denis. Young Germans from Action Reconciliation Service for Peace, created for reconciliation after World War II, assumed the work of building it. Owing to the founder's commitment, since its inception the community has evolved into an important site for Catholic–Lutheran ecumenism. A Catholic, Brother Alois, succeeded as prior after his predecessor's death in 2005. In 2023 Brother Alois announced his resignation and was succeeded by Brother Matthew on 2 December 2023.

== History ==
=== Early years ===
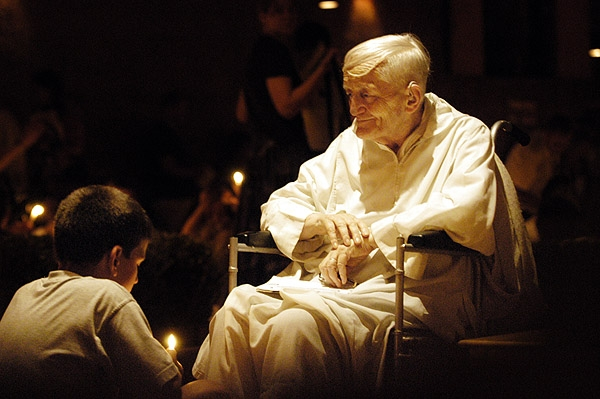
Brother Roger, founder of the Taizé Community, shown at prayer in 2003

The Taizé Community was founded by Brother Roger (Roger Schütz) in 1940. He pondered what it really meant to live a life according to the Scriptures and began a quest for a different expression of the Christian life. A year after this decision, Schütz reflected:

The defeat of France awoke powerful sympathy. If a house could be found there, of the kind I had dreamed, it would offer a possible way of assisting some of those most discouraged, those deprived of a livelihood; and it could become a place of silence and work.

Because his native Switzerland was neutral and thus less affected by the war, Schütz felt as if France would be ideal for his vision, seeing it as a "land of poverty, a land of wartime suffering, but a land of inner freedom." He eventually settled in Taizé, which was a small, isolated village just north of Cluny, the site of a historically influential Christian monastic foundation.

In September 1940, Schütz purchased a small farm house that would eventually become the home of the Taizé Community. Only miles south of the demarcation line that separated Vichy France and the Zone occupée, Brother Roger's home became a sanctuary to countless war refugees seeking shelter. On 11 November 1942, the Gestapo occupied Roger's house while he was in Switzerland collecting funds to aid in his refuge ministry. Roger was not able to return to his home in Taizé until the autumn of 1944, after the Liberation of France.

In 1941, Brother Roger had published a few small brochures outlining several facets of a Christ-centred communal life together. These brochures prompted two young men to apply, soon followed by a third. They all lived in Switzerland in a flat owned by Roger's family until after the war when they began a new life together in the French countryside. Over the next few years, several other men would join the community. On Easter Sunday 1949, seven brothers committed themselves to a life following Christ in simplicity, celibacy and community.

=== Growth and current situation ===
In the years that followed, others joined. In 1969, a young Belgian doctor became the first Catholic to pledge his life to the Taizé Community. More brothers from Reformed, Anglican and Catholic backgrounds joined the community. Soon the Brothers of Taizé were making trips to take aid to people in both rural and urban areas. They began forming "fraternities" of brothers in other cities that sought to be "signs of the presence of Christ among men, and bearers of joy". Since 1951, the brothers have lived, for longer or shorter periods, in small fraternities among the poor in India (chiefly in Calcutta), Bangladesh, the Philippines, Algeria, Cuba, South Korea, Brazil, Kenya, Senegal, and the United States (chiefly in the Hell's Kitchen section of Manhattan, New York City).

In August 2005 Brother Roger, aged 90, was killed in a knife attack by a mentally-ill woman. At his funeral, Brother Roger had an ecumenical dream fulfilled. The presider at his funeral was the president of the Vatican's council for the unity of Christians, Cardinal Walter Kasper. Anglican bishop Nigel McCulloch of Manchester, England, who represented Rowan Williams, the Archbishop of Canterbury, read the first reading in English. The second reading was read in French by the Rev. Jean-Arnold de Clermont, president of the Conference of European Churches, and in German by Bishop Wolfgang Huber, head of the Evangelical Church in Germany. Cardinals and archbishops, Orthodox, Anglican and other religious leaders and international politicians joined ordinary Christians in prayer during the funeral, including the President of Germany, Horst Köhler, and the retired Archbishop of Paris, Jean-Marie Lustiger. His funeral was attended by approximately 10,000 people.

In 2010, for the celebration of the 70th anniversary of Taizé, five years after Brother Roger's death, ecumenical messages of love and benediction were received from church leaders as varied as:

- Pope Benedict XVI
- Patriarch Bartholomew of Constantinople
- Patriarch Kirill of Moscow
- The Archbishop of Canterbury, Rowan Williams
- The General Secretary of the Lutheran World Federation, Ishmael Noko
- The General Secretary of the World Communion of Reformed Churches, Setri Nyomi
- The General Secretary of the World Council of Churches, Olav Fykse Tveit
- The Archbishop of York, John Sentamu
- The Anglican Archbishop of the Cape, Thabo Cecil Makgoba
- The President of the German Bishops' Conference, Archbishop Robert Zollitsch
- The President of the Netherlands Episcopal Conference, Ad van Luyn
- The President of the Community of Christian Churches in the Canton of Vaud, Pastor Martin Hoegger.

At the end of 2010, the community was composed of about one hundred brothers, from Protestant and Catholic traditions, who originate from about thirty countries around the world. From 2005 to 2023, the community was led by Brother Alois, a German-born Catholic, who had been appointed by Brother Roger before his death. After consulting his brothers, Brother Alois appointed Brother Matthew, a British Anglican, to succeed him in December 2023.

Welcome Center (known as "Casa"), with the clock tower to the right

== Components ==
=== Music and worship ===
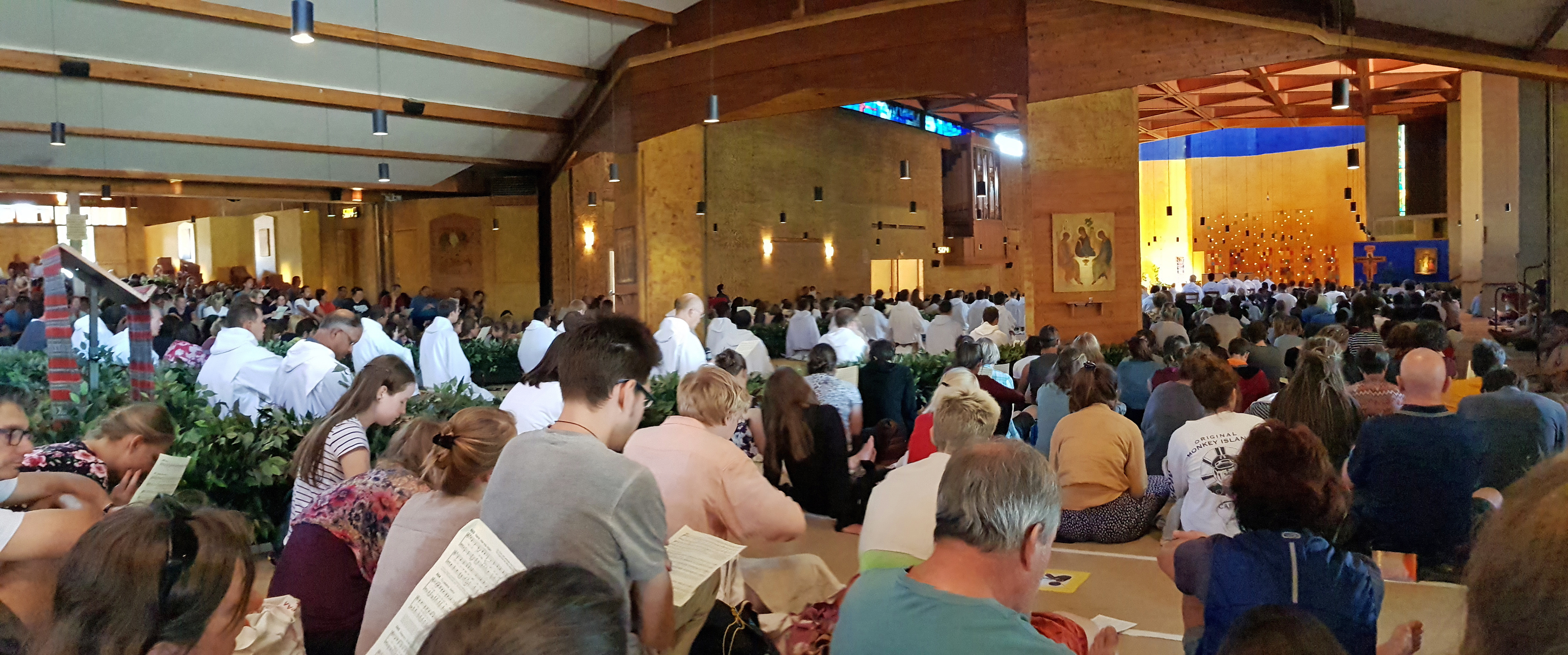
Prayer in the Church of Reconciliation at Taizé

The community, though Western European in origin, has sought to include people and traditions worldwide. They have sought to demonstrate this in the music and prayers where songs are sung in many languages, and have included chants and icons from the Eastern Orthodox tradition. The music emphasizes simple phrases, usually lines from Psalms or other pieces of Scripture, repeated and sometimes also sung in canon. Earlier Taizé community music was conceived and composed by Jacques Berthier. Later Joseph Gelineau became a major contributor to the music.

Ecumenical services based on this model and music are held in many churches throughout the world.

== Young adult meetings ==
=== In Taizé ===
Small discussion groups

Throughout the year, meetings for young adults between 15 and 35 years old (and, within certain limits, for adults and families with children) take place in Taizé. The number of visitors reaches more than 5,000 during the summer and on Easter. Meetings usually last from Sunday to Sunday, though it is also possible to just come for a few days, or, for young volunteers, to stay for a longer time.

Several sisters also help with running the meetings. However, they are not "Taizé Sisters". These sisters come from various orders, most notably the Catholic order of St. Andrew from Belgium. The Sisters of St. Andrew live in the neighboring village Ameugny.

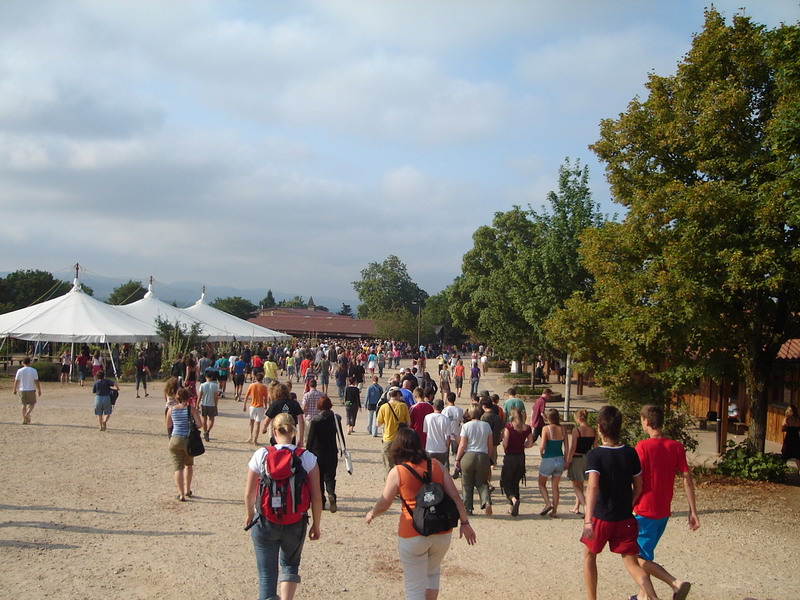
Pilgrims setting out for food

The schedule of a typical day in the youth meetings:

- Morning prayer
- Breakfast
- Bible introduction with a brother of the community followed by quiet reflection or small group discussion
- Midday prayer
- Lunch
- Song practice (optional)
- Practical tasks
- Tea time
- Workshops (optional)
- Supper
- Evening prayer
- Informal gathering at Oyak, a common area at Taizé (optional)

The evening prayer is broadcast every Saturday at 22:00 Central European Time by the German radio station Domradio and provided online as a podcast.

=== Worldwide ===
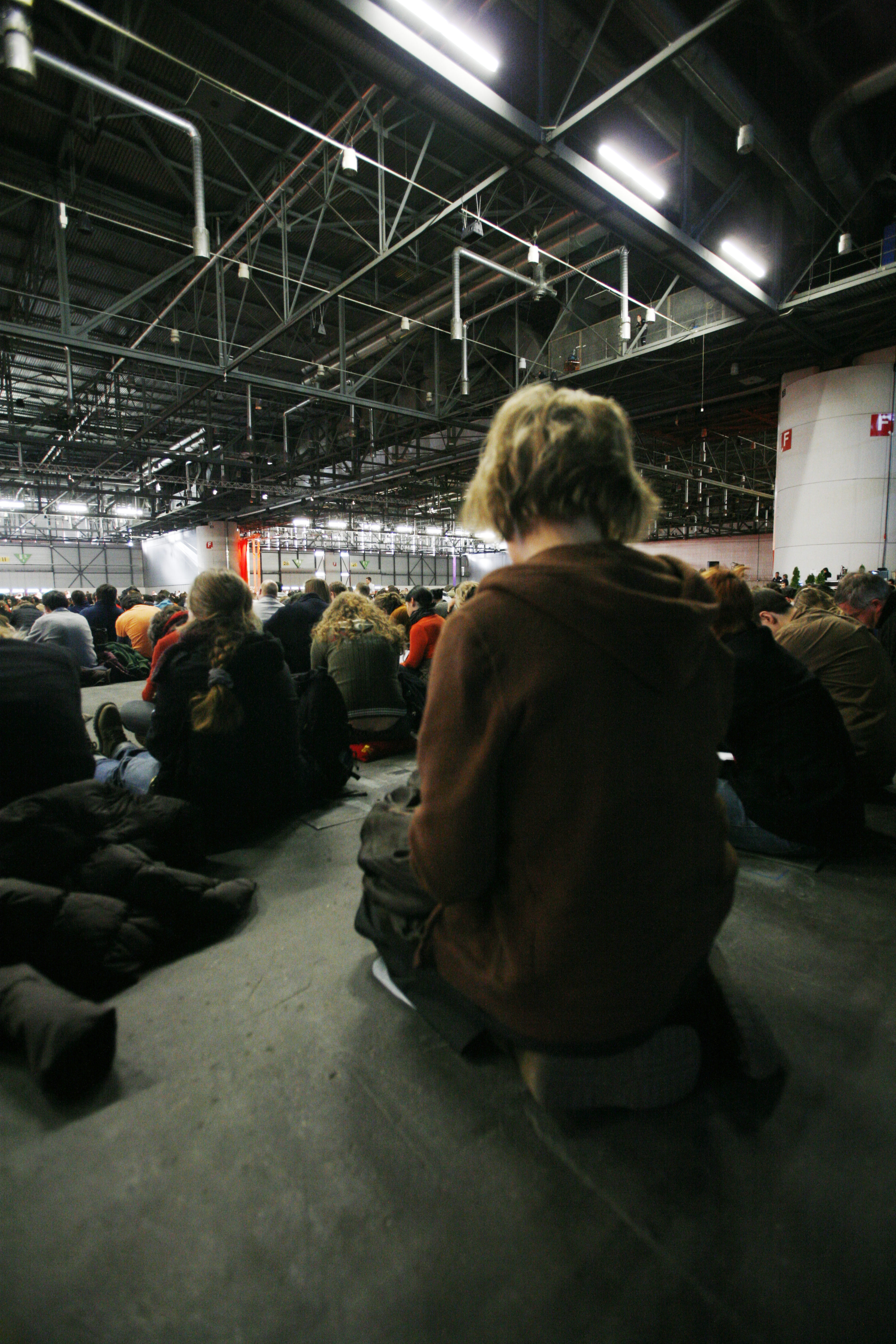
European Meeting 2007 in Geneva

The Taizé Community attempts to send pilgrims back from youth meetings to their local churches, to their parishes, groups or communities, to undertake, with many others, a "Pilgrimage of Trust on Earth." Every year around New Year (usually from 28 December to 1 January), a meeting in a large European city attracts several tens of thousands of young adults. It is organized by brothers of the Taizé Community, sisters of St. Andrew, and young volunteers from all over Europe, and from the host city. The participants stay with local families or in very simple group accommodations. In the morning, they take part in a program organized by the parish closest to their accommodation. For their midday meal, all participants travel to a central location, usually the local exhibition halls. The meal is followed by a common prayer, and the afternoon is spent in workshops covering faith, art, politics and social topics. In the evening, everyone meets again for the evening meal and an evening prayer.

In his "Unfinished Letter", published after his death, Brother Roger is quoted to have proposed to "widen" the "Pilgrimage of Trust" originating from the Taizé community. As a result, international meetings for young adults have begun to take place, beginning with Kolkata in India in 2006. The program closely resembles the European meetings, though some aspects, such as the songs, are often adapted to the local culture.

== See also ==
- Cenobitic monasticism
- Taizé - Music of Unity and Peace
