= Thais =

Thais can be the plural of Thai and refer to:

- The Thai people, the main ethnic group of Thailand
- The Thai peoples or Tai peoples, the ethnic groups of southern China and Southeast Asia

In the singular, Thais may refer to:

== People ==
=== Ancient world ===
- Thaïs, a celebrated hetaira during the era of Alexander (356-323 BCE)
- Thaïs (saint), 4th century repentant courtesan and saint of Roman Egypt

=== Modern world ===
- Thaís (footballer, born 1987), Brazilian footballer
- Thaís (footballer, born 1996), Brazilian footballer
- Thaisinha (born 1993), Brazilian footballer
- Thaís Picarte (born 1982), Brazilian football goalkeeper
- Thaís Fidélis (born 2001), Brazilian artistic gymnast
- Thais Weiller, Brazilian game designer and producer
- Thais Russomano (born 1963), Brazilian doctor and researcher
- Thais Souza Wiggers (born 1985), Brazilian television presenter and model
- Thaís de Campos (born 1956), Brazilian actress
- Thaís Melchior (born 1990), Brazilian actress
- Thaís Pacholek (born 1983), Brazilian actress
- Thaïs Blume (born 1984), Spanish actress
- Thaïs Henríquez (born 1982), Spanish synchronized swimmer
- Mayuka Thaïs (born 1979), American singer-songwriter, artist and actress
- Thais Blatnik (1919–2015), American journalist and politician
- Thais Lawton (1879–1956), American actress
- Thais St. Julien (1945–2019), American soprano

== Arts and entertainment ==
- Thaïs (opera), an 1894 opera by Jules Massenet
- Thais (1917 American film), produced by Sam Goldwyn
- Thaïs (1917 Italian film), directed by Anton Giulio Bragaglia
- Thais, a play by Menander
- Thaïs (novel), an 1890 novel by Anatole France
- The title character of Thais of Athens, a 1972 historical novel by Ivan Efremov
- Thaïs (painting), a 1781 painting by Joshua Reynolds
- "Thaïs", two songs by This Mortal Coil from the 1986 album Filigree & Shadow
- Thaïs, an Art Deco sculpture by Demétre Chiparus
- Thais, a fictional city in the video games Tibia (1997) and in Aveyond (2004)
- Thaïs Eulalia Kanellis, a character in the video game Black Closet

== Other uses ==
- HMS Thais, two Royal Navy ships
- Thais (gastropod), a genus of gastropod mollusc
- 1236 Thaïs, a main belt asteroid
- Thais (horse) (1893–1898), a British Thoroughbred racehorse and broodmare

== See also ==
- Thai (disambiguation)
