= Teo Eng Hock =

Singaporean businessman

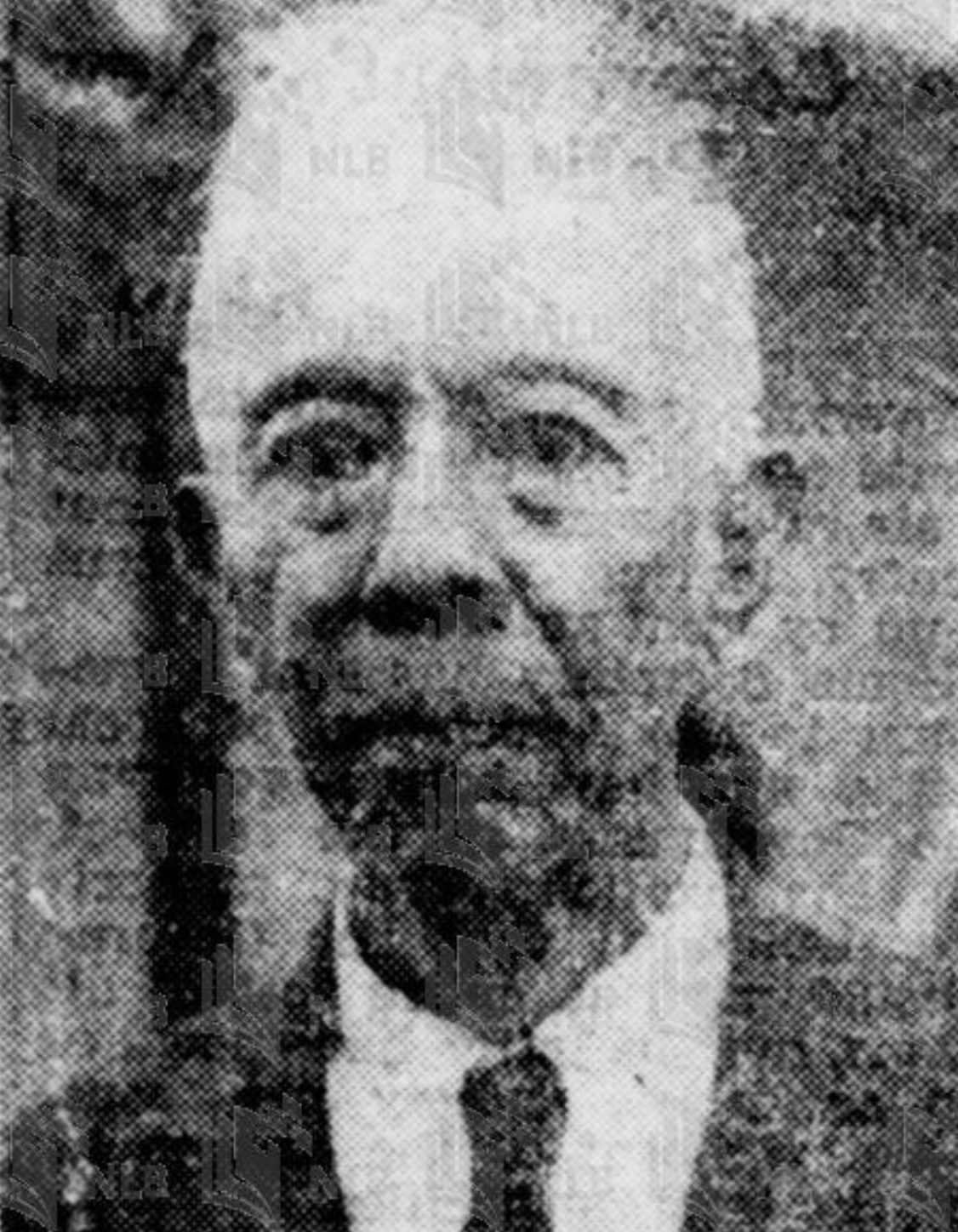
Teo in 1937

Teo Eng Hock (Chinese: 张永福; 1872 - 5 April 1959) was a rubber tycoon and the founder of the Singaporean branch of the Tongmenghui and later the Kuomintang. He later moved to China and became involved in politics there.

== Early life ==
Teo was born in Singapore in 1872.

== Career ==
Teo invested in rubber plantations and was the founder of a rubber shoe factory. He was also a cloth merchant. He initially supported the reformists and was a member of the Chinese Philomatic Society, but later began supporting Sun Yat Sen. In 1904, he established the Thoe Lam Jit Poh with fellow revolutionist Tan Chor Lam, and was the paper's editor. However, the paper folded after two years due to financial difficulties. He used the Chinese Reading Room, which was established by fellow revolutionist Tay Sek Tin, to spread his revolutionary ideas. His bungalow, the Wan Qing Yuan, served as the headquarters of the revolutionists.

In 1906, Teo established the Singapore branch of the Tongmenghui. Sun Yat Sen visited Singapore in June 1906 and reorganised the branch, with Teo becoming the branch's chairman. In the same year, Teo founded the pro-revolution newspaper The Union Times. However, the newspaper fell under the control of reformists three months later. In the following year, he founded the pro-revolution newspaper Chong Shing Yit Pao with fellow revolutionists Tan Chor Lam and Lim Nee Soon, and established the Tung Teh Reading Room.

In February 1912, the Singapore branch of the Tongmenghui became the Singapore branch of the Kuomintang, following the establishment of the Republic of China, and Teo served as its honorary chairman. In 1914, the Singapore branch of the Kuomintang began using the Tung Teh Reading Room as a front organisation. In 1925, he was made a Justice of the Peace. In 1926, the colonial government dissolved the Singapore branch of the Kuomintang. In the 1930s, Teo was known as the "Rubber King" of Singapore. He also founded the Min Kuo Jih Pao in Singapore.

Teo moved to China in either 1926 or 1932 and was appointed the Chief of the Central Bank in Swatow, the Mayor of Swatow, and the head of the Overseas Chinese Affairs Bureau. He was also made a member of the Chinese Affairs Committee in Nanjing. However, he later became a supporter of Wang Jingwei and was made a member of the Central Supervisory Committee, which Wang had established with the assistance of the Japanese. Due to this, Teo was arrested by the Kuomintang after World War II for treason.

After being released from prison, Teo returned to Singapore. He became a trustee of the Ngee Ann Kongsi.

== Personal life and death ==
Teo was married. His daughter was Teo Soon Kim, who was the first woman admitted to the Straits Settlements bar, and his great-grandnephew is politician Teo Chee Hean.

He died in Hong Kong on 5 April 1959 after a short illness.
