= Teo Soon Kim =

Singaporean lawyer (1904–1978)

Teo Soon Kim also Teow Soon Kim and Lo-Teo Soon Kim (23 June 1904 – 23 April 1978) was a barrister in Singapore, Hong Kong and also in England. She was the first woman admitted to the Straits Settlement bar, and the first woman barrister in Hong Kong. She also became the third Malayan Chinese woman to become a barrister in England.

== Biography ==
Teo's father, Teo Eng Hock, was a rubber baron from Teochew. Teo was encouraged by her father to get an education and attended the Methodist Girls' School. She later taught at the school for two years, but what she really wanted to do was become a lawyer. Part of her motivation for becoming a lawyer was because few women in Asia had done so and none in Singapore had been admitted to the bar. She went to the University of London to study law and lived in Finchley. She entered the Inner Temple in London in May 1924 where she studied with H. H. L. Bellot. In 1927, became the third Malayan Chinese woman to be admitted to the bar of England and Wales.

Teo returned to Singapore and married Lo Long Chi in December 1928. In 1929, Teo was admitted to the Singapore bar. She practiced for a few years in Singapore after spending two years in China. In Singapore, she took on civil and criminal cases and argued in front of the Supreme Court in 1932. She was first woman to argue a case in front of the Supreme Court and drew a crowd in the public gallery. In 1932, she moved to Hong Kong and became the first woman admitted to the bar there in August 1932.

In the early 1920s, Teo converted to Christianity. She was inducted into the Singapore Women's Hall of Fame in 2014.

== See also ==
- First women lawyers around the world
