= Chong Shing Yit Pao =

Former chinese language newspaper in Singapore

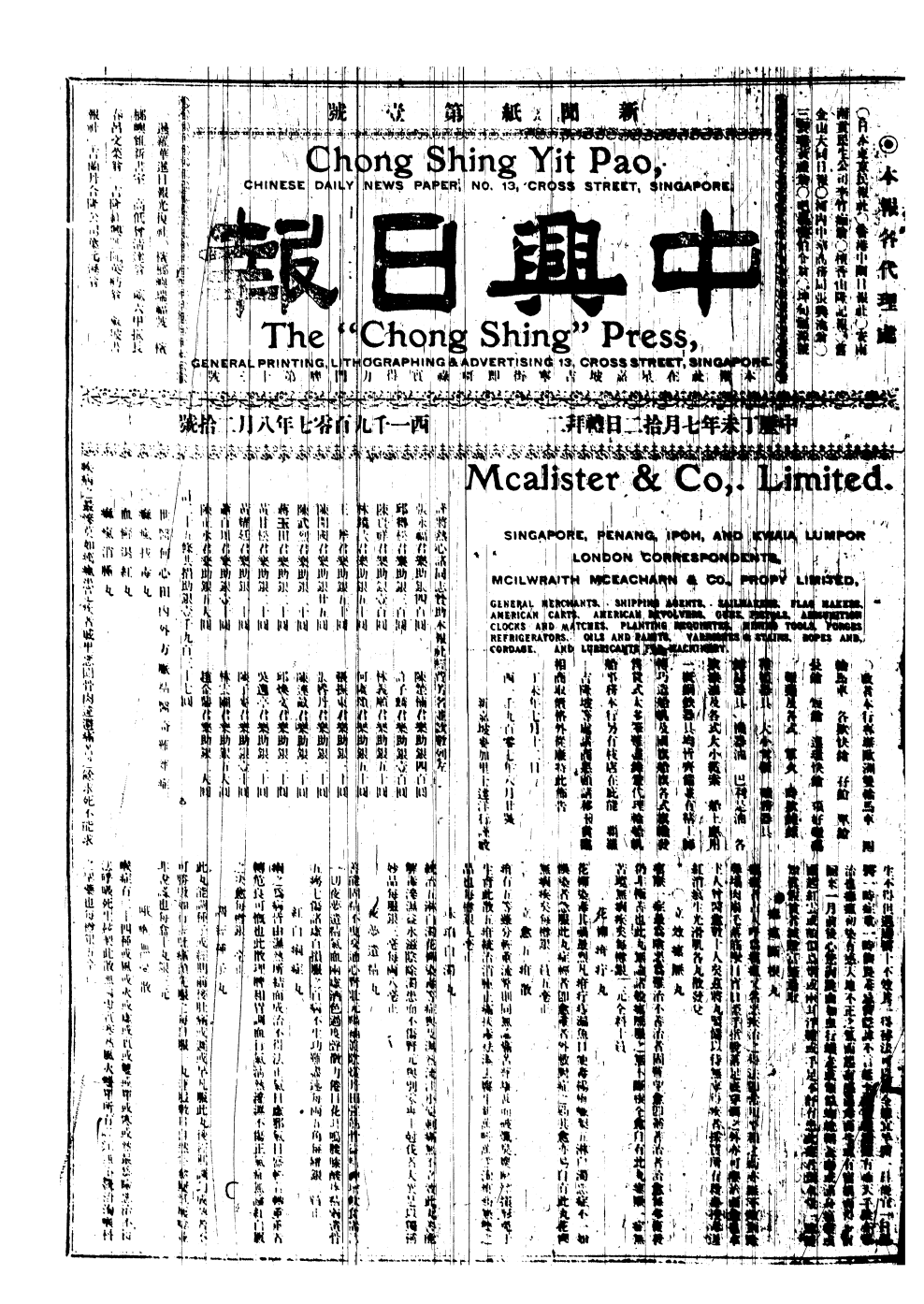
- Front page of the 20 August 1907 issue
- Format: Broadsheet
- Founder: Teo Eng Hock; Tan Chor Lam
- Launched: August 27, 1907; 118 years ago
- Ceased publication: 1910
- Language: Chinese
- Headquarters: Singapore, Straits Settlements
- Country: Singapore, Straits Settlements

Chong Shing Yit Pao (Chinese: 中兴日报, also known as Chong Shing Yat Pao and Restoration Daily), was a Chinese-language newspaper in Singapore. The newspaper was founded in 1907 by Tongmenghui members in response to the growing influence of The Union Times, a paper which they had founded but had fallen under the control of reformists.

== History ==
The Chong Shing Yit Pao was founded in 1907 by members of the Singapore branch of the Tongmenghui Teo Eng Hock and Tan Chor Lam in response to the growing influence of The Union Times, a paper which they had founded in either late 1905 or 1906, but had fallen under the control of reformists. The first edition of the newspaper was published on 20 August 1907.

The paper's literary section was used to argue, slander and refute the reformists and The Union Times through short stories, poetry and humour. Both papers frequently used the literary section to insult the other side, using various insults such as "fleas", "mad dogs" and "prostitutes". Both papers occasionally sued each other for libel.

The paper folded in 1910 due to financial difficulties.
