= Brother Alois =

Prior of the Taizé Community (born 1954)

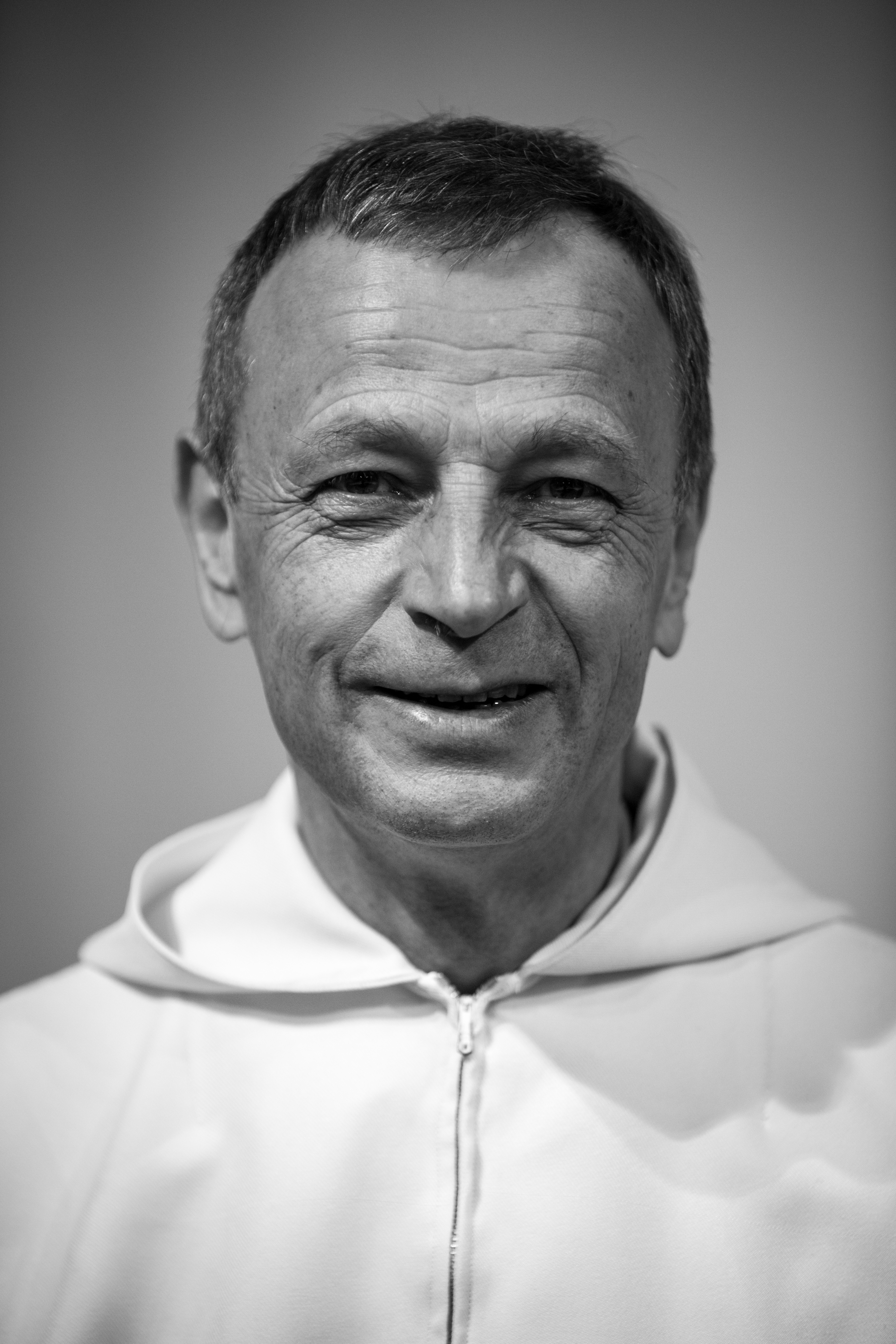
Brother Alois (born 1954), second prior of the Taizé Community from 2005 to 2023

Brother Alois of Taizé (born Alois Löser; 11 June 1954) is the former prior of the Taizé Community in France. He succeeded Brother Roger as the community's second prior after the founder's death on 16 August 2005. In 2023 he announced his resignation as prior of the community. On 2 December 2023 he was succeeded by Brother Matthew.

Brother Alois was born in 1954 in Nördlingen, Bavaria, Germany, where his parents had settled after being expelled from Czechoslovakia after World War II as ethnic Germans. He grew up in Stuttgart. Unlike his Protestant predecessor, Brother Roger, Brother Alois is a Catholic. As a teenager he was an altar boy and a youth leader at St. Nikolaus parish in eastern Stuttgart. Later he studied theology in Lyon, though he never became a priest. When he first visited the Taizé Community, it impressed him deeply. He soon became a "permanent", a person living in Taizé for an extended period, though initially not a brother in the community. He became a member of the community in 1974.

Brother Alois was appointed by Brother Roger as his successor in 1998, and assumed that as prior of the community after the death of Brother Roger in 2005. In recent years, Brother Alois has represented the community at numerous public events and has given a large number of interviews. He is known for his musical talent and has written many of the newer Taizé songs which are sung throughout the world.

In The Sunday Journal (Bavaria) on 8 May 2005, Brother Alois was asked, "What comes after Brother Roger?" His answer was, "This question naturally arises, Brother Roger always taught us to live in the present moment. Life is about joy, simplicity and mercy. Those are the cornerstones, with them we can move forward and so can all those who we welcome here."

Taizé Community
Preceded by Brother Roger	Prior; 2005–2023	Succeeded by Brother Matthew
