= Teays =

Teays may refer to:

- Teays River, a major preglacial river that drained much of the present Ohio River watershed in a more northerly downstream course
- Teays, West Virginia, an unincorporated community in Putnam County

== See also ==
- Teays Valley, West Virginia
