= Tays =

Tays may refer to:

- Tays Center, indoor arena in Alamogordo, New Mexico
- Ba Tays, a village in Yemen
- Jimmy Tays (1899-1986), American football player
- Tampere University Hospital commonly abbreviated as TAYS (Tampereen yliopistollinen sairaala)

== See also ==
- Tay (disambiguation)
- Taze (disambiguation)
