= Brother Roger =

Swiss monk (1915–2005)

Brother Roger Schutz
- Prior of Taizé
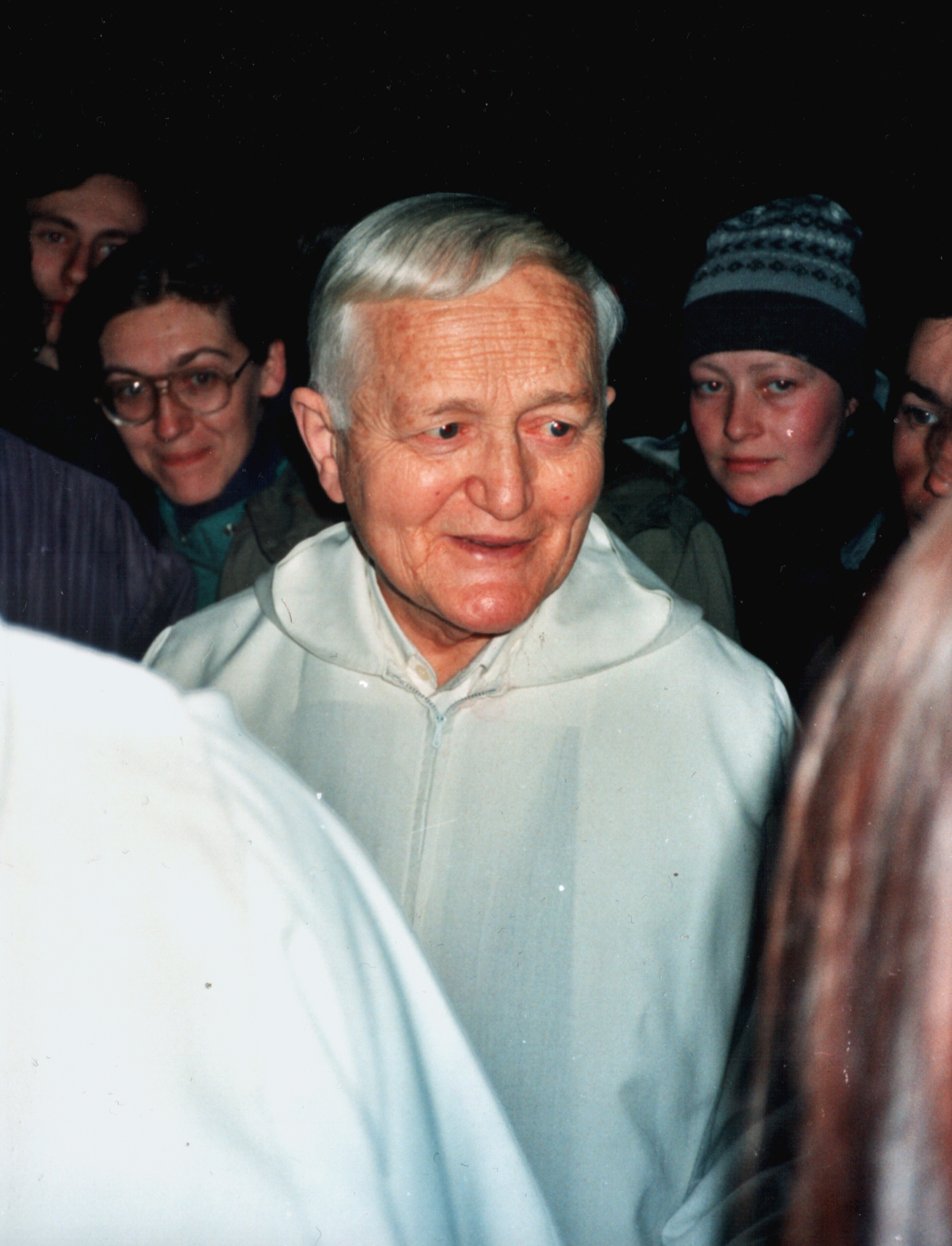
- Brother Roger Schutz in 1991
- Installed: 1940
- Term ended: 2005
- Successor: Brother Alois

Personal details
- Born: Roger Louis Schutz-Marsauche; 12 May 1915 Provence, Vaud, Switzerland
- Died: 16 August 2005 (aged 90) Taizé, Saône-et-Loire, France
- Denomination: Reformed Christianity, later reconciliation with Catholicism
- Education: Reformed theology
- Alma mater: University of Strasbourg; University of Lausanne

Roger Schutz (12 May 1915 – 16 August 2005), popularly known as Brother Roger (French: Frère Roger), was a Swiss Christian leader and monastic brother. In 1940 Schutz founded the Taizé Community, an ecumenical monastic community in Burgundy, France, serving as its first prior until his death in 2005. Towards the end of his life, the Taizé Community was attracting international attention, welcoming thousands of young pilgrims every week, which it has continued to do after his death.

== Biography ==
=== Background and early life ===
Born on 12 May 1915, in Provence, Vaud, Schutz was the ninth and youngest child of Karl Ulrich Schutz, a Protestant pastor from Bachs in the Zürcher Unterland in Switzerland, and his wife, Amélie Henriette Marsauche, a Huguenot from Burgundy, France.

From 1937 to 1940, Schutz-Marsauche studied Reformed theology in Strasbourg and Lausanne, where he was a leader in the Swiss Student Christian Movement, part of the World Student Christian Federation. Falling ill with tuberculosis, during his convalescence he began to feel drawn to a monastic way of life.

=== Taizé Community ===
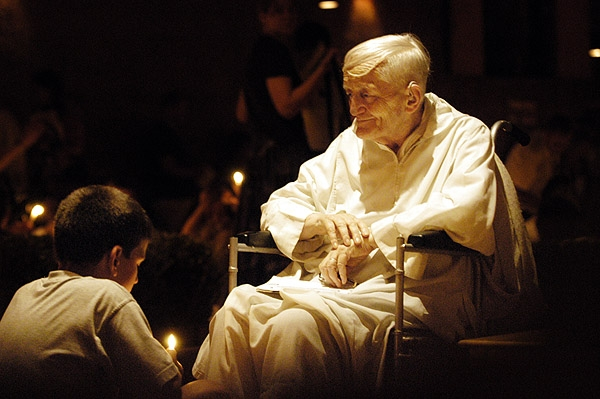
Schutz at prayer in Taizé, 2004

In 1940, at the start of World War II, Schutz-Marsauche felt called to serve those suffering from the conflict, as his maternal grandmother had done during World War I. He rode a bicycle from Geneva to Taizé, a small town near Mâcon, about 390 kilometres (240 mi) southeast of Paris. The town was then located within unoccupied France, just beyond the line of demarcation from the zone occupied by German troops. He bought an empty house, where for two years he and his sister, Genevieve, hid refugees, both Christian and Jewish, before being forced to leave Taizé, after being tipped off that the Gestapo had become aware of their activities. In 1944, he returned to Taizé to found the Community, initially a small quasi-monastic community of men living together in poverty and obedience, open to all Christians.

Since the late 1950s, many thousands of young adults from many countries have found their way to Taizé to take part in weekly meetings of prayer and reflection. In addition, Taizé brothers make visits and lead meetings, large and small, in Africa, North and South America, Asia, and in Europe, as part of a "pilgrimage of trust on earth".

The spiritual leader always kept a low profile, rarely giving interviews and refusing to permit any "cult" to grow up around himself. Prior to his death, Brother Roger was due to give up his community functions because of his advanced age and ill-health which had seen him suffer from fatigue and often use a wheelchair.

Brother Roger was a prized author and wrote many books on prayer and reflection, asking young people to be confident in God and committed to their local church community and to humanity. He also wrote books about Christian spirituality and prayer, some together with Mother Teresa with whom he shared a cordial friendship.

== Assassination ==
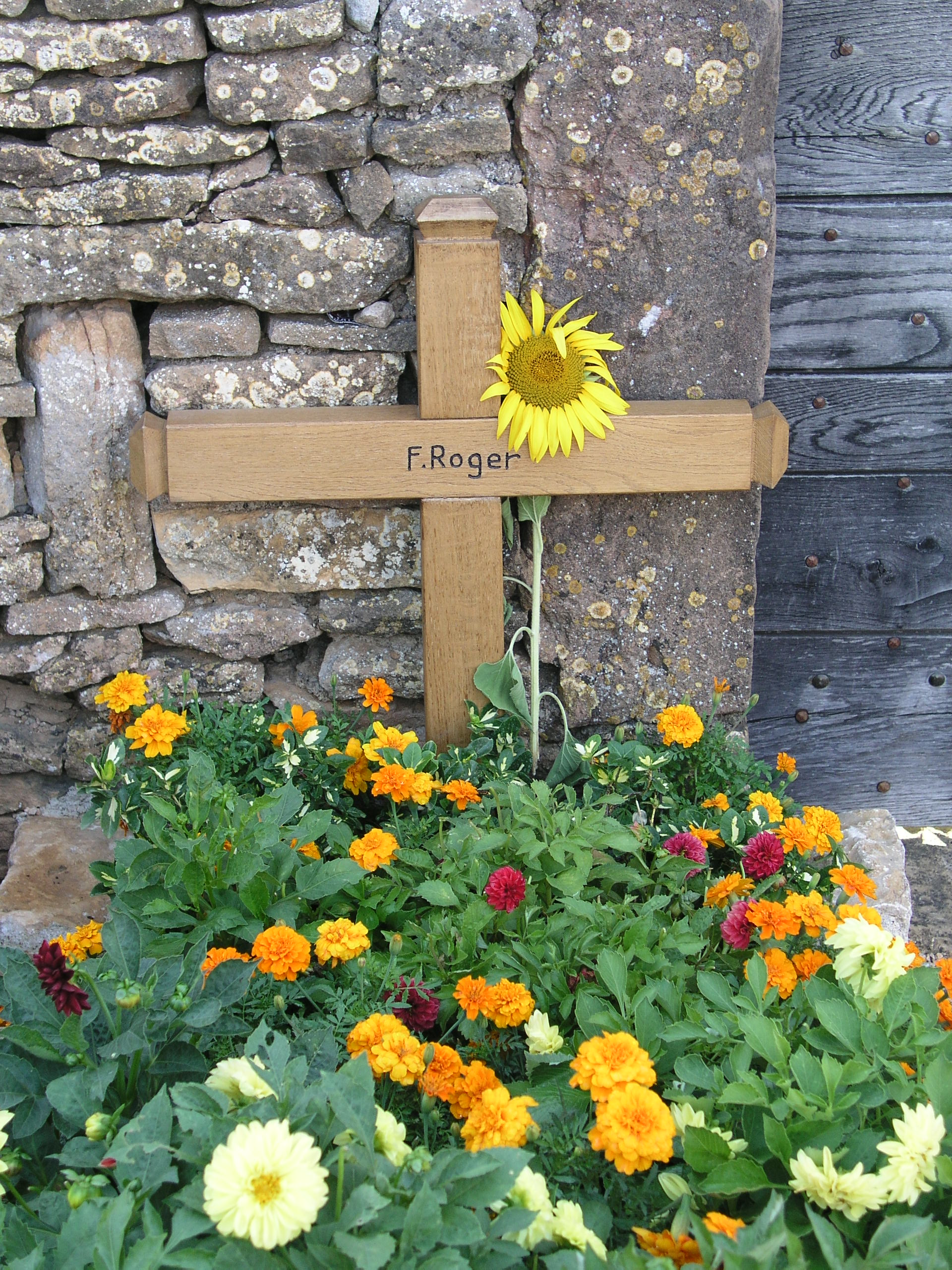
Brother Roger's grave in Taizé

Brother Roger was stabbed to death during the evening prayer service in Taizé on 16 August 2005, by a young woman named Luminița Ruxandra Solcan. She was later deemed mentally ill and was critically stabbed as well in 2011, but survived. Brother Roger, having been stabbed several times, was carried from the church by one of the brothers, but died shortly afterward. His assailant was immediately apprehended by members of the congregation and was placed in police custody.

The funeral took place on 23 August 2005. Horst Köhler, the President of Germany, and Nicolas Sarkozy, at that time Minister of the Interior of France, were in attendance. Brother Roger's community and friends attended the liturgy in the vast monastery church at Taizé, while thousands more followed it on a huge screen in fields outside the church. Brother Roger's simple wooden coffin, a wooden icon lying upon it, was carried into the church by members of the community. In a highly unusual move, the funeral was presided over by a Catholic cardinal, Walter Kasper, the president of the Vatican's Pontifical Council for Promoting Christian Unity, who celebrated the Mass with four priest-brothers of Taizé concelebrating. In his homily he said, "Yes, the springtime of ecumenism has flowered on the hill of Taizé." In reference to Brother Roger's concern for social justice, Cardinal Kasper said "Every form of injustice or neglect made him very sad." Brother Roger's successor, Brother Alois Löser, prayed for forgiveness: "With Christ on the cross we say to you, Father, forgive her, she does not know what she did."

Since 2012, Solcan, who was born in 1969, lives in a closed psychiatric ward near her hometown Iasi in Romania.

== Ecumenism ==
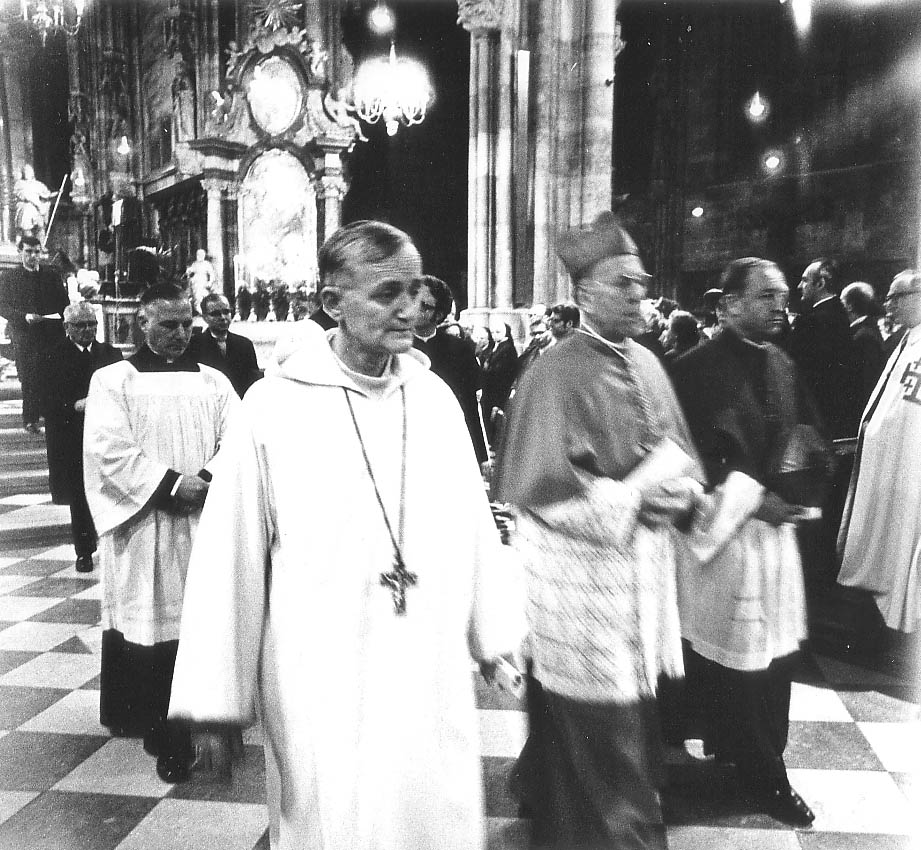
Brother Roger with Catholic and Protestant clergy, leaving an ecumenical service in St. Stephen's Cathedral, Vienna, c. 1975.

All his life, Roger devoted himself to reconciling the different Christian denominations. He especially addressed Christian youth. Part of his appeal may have been his dislike of formal preaching, while encouraging a spiritual quest as a common endeavor. During a Taizé gathering in Paris in 1995, he spoke to more than 100,000 young people who were sitting on the floor of an exhibition hall. "We have come here to search", he said, "or to go on searching through silence and prayer, to get in touch with our inner life. Christ always said, 'Do not worry, give yourself'."

== Personal life ==
=== Religious affiliation ===
Although Brother Roger had a Reformed (Protestant) background, he received the Catholic sacrament of the Eucharist at the Catholic Mass celebrated every morning in his monastery. In addition, he received the sacrament from both Pope John Paul II and Pope Benedict XVI, seemingly in contravention of canonical prohibitions reserving the sacrament exclusively to those in full communion with the Catholic Church.

According to Cardinal Walter Kasper, this was accomplished as though there was a tacit understanding between Brother Roger and the Catholic Church "crossing certain confessional" and canonical barriers through what Brother Roger called a gradual enrichment of his faith with the foundations of the Catholic Church including "the ministry of unity exercised by the bishop of Rome." Brother Roger thus appeared to have undertaken a step without precedent since the Protestant Reformation: entering progressively into full communion with the faith of the Catholic Church possibly without a formal "conversion" that would imply a break with his origins.

In 1980, during a meeting in Rome, he said in Saint Peter’s Basilica in the presence of Pope John Paul II:

I have found my own identity as a Christian by reconciling within myself the faith of my origins with the mystery of the Catholic faith, without breaking fellowship with anyone.

==== Posthumous claims ====
It was reported in the early 2000s that Brother Roger had in fact converted to Catholicism in 1972, when he received his First Communion from the local ordinary, the bishop of Autun. The journalist reporting claimed to have confirmed this with the Vatican, explaining his unfettered reception of Communion there from the sitting Pope on two different occasions. He reportedly kept his conversion a secret for the sake of the ecumenical mission of Taizé.

Brother Rogers' successor at Taizé, Brother Alois, confirmed that the sacrament occurred but denied that there was a formal conversion, stating that he merely affirmed the Creed.

== Successor ==
In 1998, Brother Roger had designated Brother Alois, a German Catholic who had originally come to Taizé as a youth and became one of the brothers, as his successor. This was confirmed by the community and in January 2005, it was announced that Alois would soon be taking Roger's place as Prior of Taizé, but this had not yet occurred at the time of Roger's death, when Alois was attending the World Youth Day 2005 celebration in Cologne, Germany. He was installed as prior shortly thereafter.

== Publications ==
- 1944, Introduction a la Vie Communautaire
- 1953, La Regle de Taizé
- 1958, Vivre l’Aujourd’hui de Dieu / Living Today for God
- 1962, L'unité, espérance de vie / Unity, Life's Hope
- 1965, Dynamique du provisoire / The Power of the Provisional
- 1968, Violence des pacifiques / Violent for Peace
- 1971, Ta fête soit sans fin / Festival Without End, diary February 1969 – May 1970
- 1973, Lutte et contemplation / Struggle and Contemplation, diary May 1970 – April 1972
- 1976, Vivre l’inespéré / A Life We Never Dared Hope For, diary May 1972 – September 1974
- 1979, Etonnement d’un amour / The Wonder of a Love, diary September 1974 – December 1976
- 1980, Les Sources de Taizé / The Sources of Taizé
- 1982, Fleurissent tes déserts / And Your Deserts Shall Flower
- 1985, Passion d’une attente / A Heart that Trusts
- 1988, Son amour est un feu / His Love Is a Fire
- 1989, Marie, Mère des Réconciliations / Mary, Mother of Reconciliations (written together with Mother Teresa)
- 1992, La prière, fraîcheur d’une source / Prayer: Seeking the Heart of God (written together with Mother Teresa)
- 1995, En tout la paix du cœur / Peace of Heart in All Things
- 2001, Dieu ne peut qu’aimer / God Is Love Alone
- 2005, Pressens-tu un bonheur ? / Do You Expect happiness?

Editions, listed alphabetically, as found in the Library of Congress Catalog shortly after his death:

- Afire with love : meditations on peace and unity. ISBN 0-8245-0474-7
- Amour de tout amour : les sources de Taizé. (1990) ISBN 2-85040-107-2
- Awakened from within : meditations on the Christian life. (1987) ISBN 0-385-23536-4
- Brother Roger of Taizé: Essential Writings (Modern Spiritual Masters Series) (2006) ISBN 1-57075-639-2
- Dynamik des Vorläufigen. (1967) Translation of Dynamique du provisoire
- Dynamique du proviso ire. (1965)
- En tout la paix du Coeur (1995) ISBN 2-259-18389-1
- Essential Writings. (2006) ISBN 978-1-57075-639-9
- Étonnement d'un amour : journal. (1979- )
- Festival (1973) a translation of Ta fête soit sans fin. ISBN 0-8164-2583-3
- Fleurissent les déserts du coeur : journal, 5e volume, 1977–1979. (1982) ISBN 2-85040-006-8
- Life from within : prayers. (1990) a Translation of: Aus dem Innern leben. ISBN 0-264-67214-3 and ISBN 0-664-25162-5
- Living today for God. (1962) Originally published under the title Vivre l'Aujourd'hui de dieu.
- Lutte et contemplation; journal 1970–1972. (1973)
- No greater love : sources of Taizé. (1991) ISBN 0-8146-2029-9 and ISBN 0-264-67253-4
- Parable of community : the rule and other basic texts of Taizé. (1980) ISBN 0-8164-2301-6
- Passion d'une attente : journal, 6e volume, 1979–1981. (1985) ISBN 2-02-008948-3
- Peace of heart in all things : meditations for each day of the year. (1996) ISBN 0-941050-96-3
- The power of the provisional. (1969) Originally published as Dynamique du provisoire. ISBN 0-340-02544-1
- Le Règle de Taizé. (1966)
- Revelation, a Protestant view; the Dogmatic Constitution on divine revelation, a commentary / by Roger Schutz and Max Thurian. (1968)
- The Rule of Taizé in French and in English. (1968) Translation of Le Règle de Taizé ISBN 0-8164-2564-7
- The Rule of Taizé in French and in English. (1967) French title: Le Règle de Taizé
- Struggle and contemplation; journal, 1970–2. (1974) Translation of Lutte et contemplation. ISBN 0-8164-2106-4
- Struggle and contemplation : journal 1970–2. (1974) Translation of Lutte et contemplation. ISBN 0-281-02809-5
- Ta fête soit sans fin. (1971)
- Ta fête soit sans fin : journal 1969–1970. (1971)
- Unanimité dans le pluralisme. (1966)
- Unanimité dans le pluralisme. (1972)
- Unanimity in pluralism. (1967)
- Unity: man's tomorrow / by Roger Schutz (1962) Translation of L'unité, espérance de vie.
- Violence des pacifiques. (1968)
- Violent for peace. (1970) Translation of Violence des pacifiques. ISBN 0-664-24922-1
- Violent for peace (1970) Translation of Violence des pacifiques. ISBN 0-232-51093-8
- Vivre l'inespéré : journal 1972–1974. (1976)
- Taizé: lieu de communion. (1972)
- Mary, Mother of Reconciliations / by Mother Teresa of Calcutta, Brother Roger of Taizé (1989) ISBN 0-8091-3063-7
- Meditations on the way of the cross / by Mother Teresa of Calcutta and Brother Roger of Taizé (1987) Translation of: Kreuzweg ISBN 0-8298-0585-0
- Seeking the heart of God : reflections on prayer / Mother Teresa and Brother Roger (1993) Translated from the French. ISBN 0-06-068238-8

== Distinctions ==
- John Templeton Foundation: Templeton Prize (1974)
- Börsenverein des Deutschen Buchhandels: Friedenspreis des Deutschen Buchhandels (1974)
- University of Warsaw: Honorary doctorate (1986)
- UNESCO: UNESCO Prize for Peace Education (1988)
- City of Aachen: Charlemagne Prize (1989)
- Catholic University of Leuven: Honorary doctorate (1990)
- Alfred Toepfer Stiftung: Robert Schuman Prize (1992)
- Notre Dame University: Notre Dame Award (1996)
- Saint John’s University: Dignitas Humana Award (2003)
- Archbishop Rowan Williams: Lambeth Cross for Ecumenism (2004)

Taizé Community
Preceded by Founder	Prior; 1940–2005	Succeeded by Brother Alois
