= Guotai (given name) =

- Traditional Chinese: 國泰
- Simplified Chinese: 国泰
Transcriptions
Standard Mandarin
- Hanyu Pinyin: guó tài
- Wade–Giles: Kuo T'ai
Yue: Cantonese
- Jyutping: gwok3 taai3

Guotai is a pinyin transliteration of a Chinese given name; in Cantonese dialect, it may also transliterate as Kwok Tai; and in Singapore and Malaysia, as Kok Thay. Notable people with the name include:

- Zhou Guotai, Chinese military general
- Law Kwok-tai, Republic of China (Taiwan) international footballer from Hong Kong in the 1950s and 1960s
- Lim Kok Thay, Malaysian billionaire

== See also ==
- Guotai (disambiguation)
