= Tay Sek Tin =

Chinese pastor

- 郑聘廷
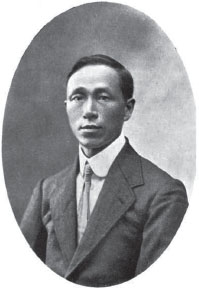
- Born: 1872; Huian, Fujian, (Qing dynasty) Qing empire
- Died: January 15, 1944 (aged 71–72); Outram Road, Singapore
- Occupation: Pastor
- Known for: First Chinese-ordained minister in the synod of Singapore-Malaya Presbyterian Church
- Notable work: Founded the Jubilee Church on Outram Road in 1939, established the first Chinese Presbyterian Church and Sin Chew Kindergarten in Tras Street
- Spouse: Ng Pek Geok
- Children: 7

Rev. Tay Sek Tin (1872 - 1944) was a Chinese pastor. He helped set up the Chinese Reading Room in 1902 and was a member of the Tongmenghui.

== Biography ==
Tay was born in Fujian in 1872 and became a Christian when he was thirteen years old. When he was nineteen, he joined the theology class of the London Missionary Society in Xiamen. Tay became a pastor in 1896. By 1897, his health had begun to decline, and was advised to migrate to the warmer climate in Singapore. There, he was ordained pastor by the presbyterian congregation. In 1902, he helped establish the Chinese Reading Room to give public access to reading materials as well as to spread Christian faith. In 1904, Tay became the first pastor of the Hokien Chinese Church, now known as the Jubilee Church. In 1903, he assisted Rev. J. A. B. Cook set up the Paya Lebar Church. In 1908, he began a church in Seletar with land provided by Teo Eng Hock.

In 1906, Tay joined the Tongmenghui in Singapore and was more active in revolutionary active in the years just before the 1911 Revolution in China. He was involved in the local revolutionary dramatist movement and was one of the organisers of the "Fang Ai Pan", which translated to the Universal Love Troupe.

After his health further deteriorated, Tay gave up the work of his pastorate and instead turned to the rubber industry, becoming the director of Han Yang Plantations Ltd., which was set up by Lim Boon Keng and Lim Nee Soon, for a while. He continued to be an honorary pastor and provided active supervision during the vacancy in the pastorate of the Tanjong Pagar Church.
