= SS Cathay =

SS Cathay was the name of a number of ships, including:

- SS Cathay (1872) served with P&O until sold in 1890.
- SS Cathay, launched in 1924, served with P&O until bombed and sunk in 1942.
- SS Cathay, launched in 1942 as Empire Archer, renamed Cathay in 1959 and operated by the Cathay Shipping Corporation, Panama and scrapped in 1963.
- SS Cathay (1957), completed for Compagnie Maritime Belge in 1957 as Baudouinville, withdrawn 1960, renamed Cathay in 1961 and operated by P&O. Transferred in 1969 to P&O subsidiary Eastern & Australian Steamship Company, (E&A). Withdrawn December 1975. Eventually passed to People's Republic of China as Kengshin, later Shanghai. Fate uncertain. Sister ship SS Chitral (1956) was built as CMB's Jadotville in 1956, also transferred 1961 to P&O then to E&A (1970). Withdrawn 1975, later scrapped Taiwan.
