= Taylor Felt =

- Born: March 30, 2001
- Origin: Darien, Connecticut
- Genres: Pop, Alt pop
- Occupations: Singer, songwriter
- Instruments: Vocals, piano
- Years active: 2018–present
- Website: taylorfelt.com

Taylor Felt (born March 30, 2001) is an American singer-songwriter. She rose to prominence on social media through her #MashupMonday videos and was one of TikTok's first official music ambassadors.

== Life and career ==
Taylor Felt was born on March 30, 2001, in Darien, Connecticut, to Christine and Kenneth Felt, operators of East Coast Irrigation. She has three younger brothers: KC, a visual effects producer who was worked with musician Machine Gun Kelly, Hunter, and Ryan. She started singing on her mother's karaoke machine at the age of two, began acting and voice lessons at the age of seven, took up piano lessons at the age of eight, and uploaded her first YouTube video at the age of nine. By the age of 11, she had written seven songs and won a spot in the Darien Young Composers competition with an original song.

From eighth grade onward, Felt was homeschooled to focus on her music career, which included regularly traveling to New York City for auditions on Broadway, on Disney, and on Nickelodeon. She obtained a two-hour show at The Bijou Theatre in Bridgeport at the age of 14. When she was 15 years old, her vocal and piano act won first place in the children's division of Darien's Got Talent, which was judged by prominent music industry figures such as the vice president of Columbia Records/Sony Music and the producer of the Broadway musical Kinky Boots. That same year, her original song "Human Beings" was featured in Girls' Life magazine. By 2018, she had recorded two songs, "Touch the Sky" and "Done with It", with producer NYMZ and garnered 200,000 followers on social media through her weekly #MashupMonday videos. At the age of 19, she moved to Los Angeles with her brother KC to pursue her music career.

Just before the COVID-19 pandemic started in 2020, Felt sang the national anthem at a Los Angeles Lakers game. That same year, she reached 2.8 million followers on TikTok and became one of TikTok's first official music ambassadors. On May 21, 2021, she released her first solo single, "Once in a Blue Moon", which she has described as being about "just letting your hair down, getting into your zone, and doing something once in a blue moon". In August 2023, she released the first song off her debut EP, "Days Like This", which was featured in Apple Music’s “Best New Songs” section. A month later, she participated in an episode of iHeart Radio's KIIS-FM. The next two singles off her EP, "Mirror Mirror" and "I Wish U Would Cheat", came out in 2024. On June 6, 2024, she released her debut EP, Dead Flowers, receiving 250,000 streams within its first month.

In February 2025, Felt released "Not Gonna Wait", which she described as "a final goodbye to that heartache" on Dead Flowers. "I Hope U Heal", a tribute to her mother's cancer battles and struggles with knee surgery, came out in April 2025. In August 2025, she sang the national anthem at a Connecticut Sun game.
