= Guotai =

- Traditional Chinese: 國泰[民安]
- Simplified Chinese: 国泰[民安]
- Literal meaning: The country flourishes, [and the people are peaceful]
Transcriptions
Standard Mandarin
- Hanyu Pinyin: guótài [mínān]
- Wade–Giles: kuo t‘ai, [min an]
Yue: Cantonese
- Jyutping: gwok3 taai3, [man4 on1]

Guotai or Guo Tai is the atonal pinyin romanization of various Chinese words and names, usually in reference to a traditional expression about a peaceful and prosperous era in a country's history.

It may refer to:

== Business ==
- Guotai Junan Securities, a Chinese listed company, a securities broker and an investment bank, that formed by a merger
  - Guotai Junan Futures, a subsidiary of Guotai Junan Securities
  - Guotai Junan International Holdings, a listed company based in Hong Kong and a subsidiary of Guotai Junan Securities
  - Guotai Securities, a predecessor of Guotai Junan Securities
- Cathay Pacific Airways, known as just Cathay Pacific, is a Hong Kong–based airline, also known as its pinyin transliteration of its Chinese name as Guotai hangkong
- Cathay Bank, a United States bank that was specialized for Chinese communities, also known as its pinyin transliteration of its Chinese name as Guotai Yinhang
  - Cathay General Bancorp, parent company of Cathay Bank, a listed company in NASDAQ
- Cathay United Bank, a Taiwanese financial services company, also known as its pinyin transliteration of its Chinese name as Guotai Shihua Yinhang
- Cathay Life Insurance, a Taiwanese insurance company, also known as its pinyin transliteration of its Chinese name as Guotai Renshou
- Cathay Organisation, a Singapore film company, also known as its pinyin transliteration of its Chinese name as Guotai Jigou
  - Cathay Organisation (Hong Kong), formerly known as Motion Picture & General Investment, a Hong Kong–based film company and a subsidiary of Cathay Organisation

== Buildings ==
- Cathay Theatre, a historical landmark movie theatre in Shanghai, also known as its pinyin transliteration of its Chinese name as Guotai Dianyingyuan
- The Cathay, a historical landmark movie theatre in Singapore that was owned by Cathay Organisation
- Cathay City, headquarters of Cathay Pacific Airways

== Names ==
- Guotai (given name), also in the form of Kowk Tai, Kok Thay
- Guo Tai (Chinese: 郭泰, a.k.a. 郭太), a Chinese scholar-official of Eastern Han dynasty
- Shen Zujian Qing dynasty Chinese people, also known as his alternative name Guotai (Chinese: 果臺; pinyin: Guǒtái)
- Lady Wu (Chinese: 吳國太), a fictional character in the Romance of the Three Kingdoms, Guotai (國太) was her nickname

== See also ==
- Cathay (disambiguation)
- Kuo Tai-yuan
- Terry Gou Tai-ming
- Thailand (Chinese: 泰國)
