= Taytay =

Taytay may refer to:

- Taytay, Palawan, Philippines, a municipality and former kingdom
  - Taytay Airport
  - Taytay (crater), an impact crater on Mars named after the town
- Taytay, Rizal, Philippines
- Taylor Swift (born 1989), nicknamed TayTay, American singer-songwriter

== See also ==
- Tay 2 (radio station) Tayside, Scotland, UK
- Tay (disambiguation)
