= TAY (singer) =

Trap and R&B singer

- Born: Tiago Amaral; 17 February 1999 (age 27); Seixal, Portugal
- Genres: Trap, R&B
- Occupations: Singer-songwriter, dancer
- Labels: 808 MEDIA, Sony

Tiago Amaral, mostly known by his stage name TAY (born 17 February 1999), is a Portuguese trap and R&B singer and a self taught dancer.

== Career ==
He started posting his own songs on his YouTube channel in 2018, but it was with his single "Pensa Bem" featuring Dylan that he gained his national recognition.

== Discography ==
=== Singles ===
==== As lead artist ====
List of singles, with selected details and chart positions
| Title | Year | Peak chart positions | Certifications | Album |
| Title | Year | POR | Certifications | Album |
|---|---|---|---|---|
| "Gang Gang" | 2018 | — | | Non-album single(s) |
| "She Love Me" | 2018 | — | | Non-album single(s) |
| "Pensa Bem" (feat. Dylan) | 2019 | 9 | AFP: Platinum | Non-album single(s) |
| "Não Preciso" (feat. Dylan) | 2019 | 9 | AFP: Platinum | Non-album single(s) |
| "Tipo Nada" (feat. João Sousa) | 2019 | 25 | | Non-album single(s) |
| "Tou Fora" (feat. Biya) | 2019 | — | | Non-album single(s) |
"—" denotes a recording that did not chart or was not released in that territory.

== Awards ==
| Year | Award | Nominee | Category | Result |
|---|---|---|---|---|
| 2019 | MTV Europe Music Award | TAY | Best Portuguese Act | Nominated |
