= Taylor Beck (model) =

American model

- Born: Tucson, Arizona
- Occupation(s): Film, television actress, model
- Television: Underwater Action, Millionaire Matchmaker
- Height: 1.75 m (5 ft 9 in)

Taylor Beck is a female model and actress from Tucson, Arizona.

Beck is one of the five models who star in the reality television program Underwater Action. Beck has also had appearances in the TV series Millionaire Matchmaker and has uncredited parts in the television series Entourage and the film Into the Blue 2: The Reef. Beck appeared as the cover girl for the November 2011 issue of 202 Magazine.

She has also done shows for Harry Wilson, Damiani, and a number of magazines and charities.

Genres include acting, editorial, fit modeling, fitness, glamour, lifestyle, lingerie, pinup, promotional modeling, runway, swimwear, and underwater

She used to live in Kailua, Hawaii and moved to Tampa, Florida.
