= Taizé, Saône-et-Loire =

Taizé
- Commune
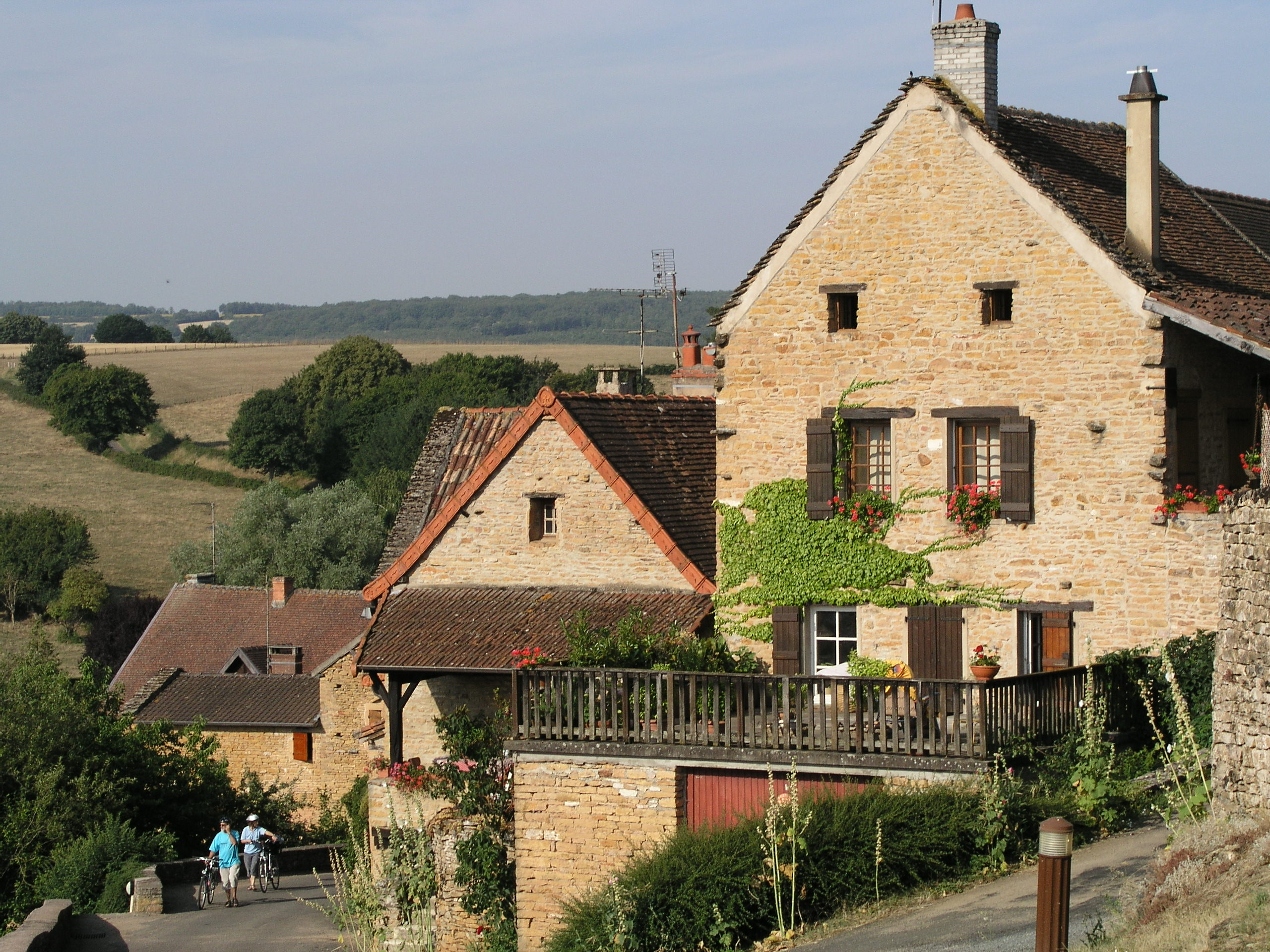

- Coat of arms
- Location of Taizé
- Location within France Location within Bourgogne-Franche-Comté
- Coordinates: 46°30′51″N 4°40′39″E
- Country: France
- Region: Bourgogne-Franche-Comté
- Department: Saône-et-Loire
- Arrondissement: Mâcon
- Canton: Cluny

Government
  - Mayor (2020–2026): Kiki Bouillin
- Area^{1}: 3.16 km^{2} (1.22 sq mi)
- Elevation: 215 m (705 ft)
- Highest elevation: 263 m (863 ft)
- Lowest elevation: 210 m (690 ft)
- Population (2023): 174
  - Density: 55.1/km^{2} (143/sq mi)
- Time zone: UTC+01:00 (CET)
  - Summer (DST): UTC+02:00 (CEST)
- INSEE/Postal code: 71532 /71250
- ^{1} French Land Register data, which excludes lakes, ponds, glaciers > 1 km^{2} (0.386 sq mi or 247 acres) and river estuaries.

Taizé (French pronunciation: [tɛze]) is a commune in the Saône-et-Loire department in the region of Bourgogne-Franche-Comté in eastern France. The commune lies 33 km (21 mi) northwest of Mâcon, the capital of Saône-et-Loire, and 9 km (5.6 mi) north of the town of Cluny.

== Pilgrimage site ==
The commune contains two churches; the small Parish church and the much larger "Church of Reconciliation". The latter church can hold over 6,000 people. Both churches are run by the Taizé Community, an ecumenical monastic community founded in 1940 by Brother Roger. It is composed of more than one hundred brothers, from Protestant and Catholic traditions, who originate from about thirty countries across the world.

Taizé is today known as a place of pilgrimage, primarily for young adults: every week, hundreds and thousands of visitors, generally between the ages of 17 and 30, visit Taizé for an experience of prayer and communal life.

== Geography ==
The commune has an area of 3.16 km^{2} (1.22 sq mi). The river Grosne forms all of the commune's western border.

== Miscellaneous ==
The asteroid 100033 Taizé was discovered by Freimut Börngen on April 9, 1990. It is named in honour of Taizé.

== Gallery ==
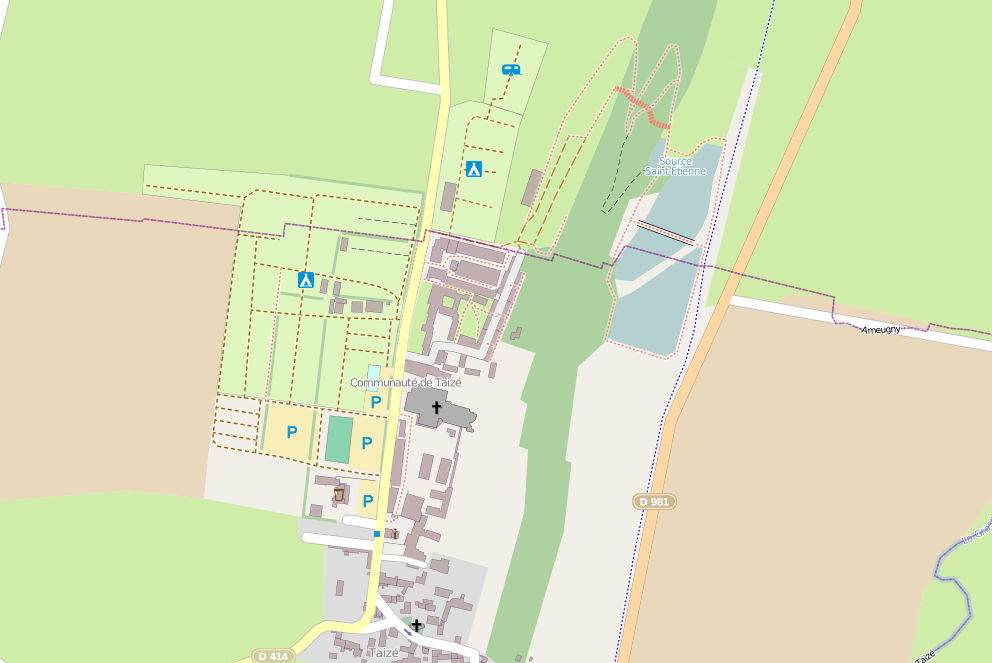
A map of Taizé and camp site

== See also ==
- Christian pilgrimage
- Communes of the Saône-et-Loire department
