= Makwerekwere =

South African afrophobic slur

The term makwerekwere (pronounced: /mɑːkwɛrɛkwɛrɛ/ or MAH-query-query), amakwerekwere or kwerekwere is commonly used in South Africa as a derogatory slur against foreign nationals, particularly black Africans. The slur has a multifaceted origin, with potential roots in the Xhosa language, French colonial history, and the Congolese language Lingala. This term has been associated with discriminatory and xenophobic behaviour, and it played a role in the xenophobic attacks in South Africa in 2008, during which over sixty people were killed and thousands were displaced. The use of the slur has also been condemned by various groups, including the South African Human Rights Commission and political figures like Julius Malema.

In popular culture, makwerekwere has been employed to depict certain individuals and groups as outsiders in South African films and literature. It is used to frame foreigners as scapegoats for social issues, such as crime and disease, and perpetuates harmful stereotypes. Artists and performers have used creative expressions like dance and music to protest against xenophobic attacks and challenge the use of this derogatory slur, emphasising the concept of Ubuntu (humanity towards others) and promoting unity.

== Etymology ==
There is no consensus on the origin of the word. Craig Prentiss, Professor of Religious Studies at the Rockhurst University, suggests that kwerekwere is a distortion of the word korekore (a subgroup of the Shona people in neighbouring Zimbabwe). This is a plausible etymology of the word as many people in Zambia, where a number of South African exiles resided prior to 1994, the term makorekore was frequently employed. This term was used in a non-pejorative manner to categorize all individuals of the Shona ethnicity from the region known as Rhodesia in the 1970s, which is presently recognised as Zimbabwe.

Another theory says that the word originated from Xhosa, one of South Africa's official languages, and have been derived from the plural prefix ama- and kwerekwere; the latter is an imitative sound that South Africans use to represent the speech of people from other African countries. Foreigners were referred to as "barbarians" by the Greeks because they allegedly shouted "bar, bar" incomprehensibly; South Africans assert that when immigrants open their lips, they utter "kwere, kwere".

According to another theory, the term makwerekwere originated from the French phrase "macaque qui travaille", meaning "monkey who works", which was used to describe African labourers brought to the French colonies in the 18th and 19th centuries. This derogatory phrase was later shortened to "macaque", which became a common racial slur used by French settlers against the African workers. The term makwerekwere could have been a South African modification of this phrase.

Another suggestion is that the word has its origins in the Congolese language Lingala, where the word "werekere" means to wander around aimlessly. It is believed that South Africans later adopted the word to describe immigrants who are perceived to be aimlessly wandering around the country.

The pronunciation of makwerekwere is not "ma queer queer" but rather MAH-query-query (/mɑːkwɛrɛkwɛrɛ/).

== Usage ==
The term makwerekwere is considered offensive, derogatory, xenophobic, and afrophobic. It has been in use in South Africa since the early 2000s and has become a common derogatory slur used against foreigners, particularly those from other African countries, including immigrants from Zimbabwe, Nigeria, and Somalia. It is used to create a sense of "otherness" and to justify discriminatory and xenophobic behaviour towards foreign nationals. Sociologist David M. Matsinge argued that the term makwerekwere is used to dehumanise black Africans and make them seem less human than South Africans. The term has become so pervasive that it has been included in dictionaries.

The usage of the term makwerekwere has been linked to xenophobic attacks in South Africa. In May 2008, a wave of xenophobic attacks swept across the country, resulting in the deaths of over sixty people and the displacement of thousands, during which the slur was used in online posts. Foreign nationals, particularly those from other African countries, were targeted in the attacks, with the attackers using the term makwerekwere to refer to their victims. The attacks, including police brutality, were fuelled by a combination of economic factors and deep-seated prejudices against foreign nationals. These victims are often scapegoated for various issues, including crime, disease, and unemployment. In January 2026 king Misuzulu kaZwelithini in a speech with intention to calm xenophobic sentiments used the derogatory term in reference to foreigners this caused a backlash his comments were condemned and seen as a leadership failure.

=== Condemnation ===
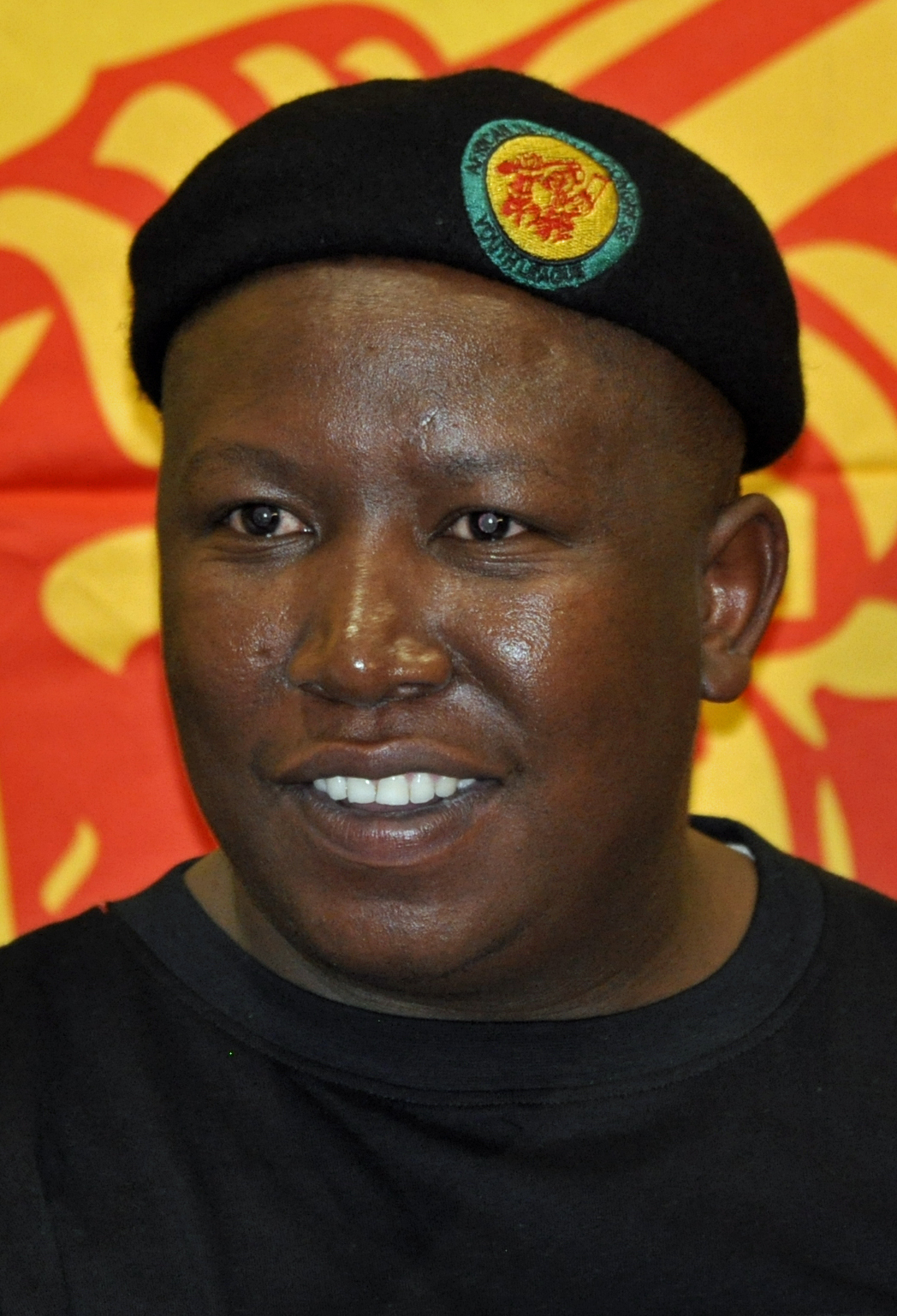
Julius Malema called for South Africans to stop using the slur.

The usage of the term makwerekwere has been condemned by various groups, including the South African Human Rights Commission. In a 2008 statement, the commission called on South Africans to refrain from using the term as it promotes hatred and intolerance towards foreign nationals. The commission urged South Africans to respect the dignity and rights of all people, regardless of their nationality. Julius Malema, leader of the Economic Freedom Fighters, called for South Africans to stop using the slur, and said:

We are one family. Borders were imposed on us. You must not buy into the story of the existence of Botswana or of Lesotho because all these borders are an imagination. You are saying #BlackLivesMatter, yet you support the borders. You say you don’t like imperialism and colonialism, but you support the borders. The border was created by colonisers.

— Julius Malema, addressing protesters near the United States embassy, Pretoria

== In popular culture ==
In popular culture, particularly in South African films, the term makwerekwere has been used to frame certain individuals and groups as outsiders. For example, the 2005 South African slapstick comedy film Mama Jack uses the term to refer to certain characters in the film. Tagwirei noted how "Mama Jack" frames certain individuals and groups as makwerekwere, and uses humour and caricature to dehumanise foreigners and perpetuate harmful stereotypes.

In South African author Phaswane Mpe's 2001 novel Welcome to Our Hillbrow, the protagonist Refentse moves to Hillbrow, a place devoid of a history and shared values or beliefs, and encounters the makwerekwere treatment firsthand. The novel shows how the makwerekwere are seen as outsiders and often blamed for various social ills such as crime and disease. The characters in the novel are linked through a trope of infection, and the association between the outsider and disease is explored.

Flatfoot Dance Company's trilogy Homeland, and Girl Ruggedeyes’ Bhenga dance were used to protest against xenophobic attacks and the use of the slur, as well as exploring the concept of Ubuntu. In 1993, Boom Shaka released the kwaito classic "KwereKwere" which discouraged xenophobia.

== See also ==
- Kaffir or "the K-word" – an ethnic slur – the use of it in reference to black people being particularly common in South Africa
- Ajam – Arabic word for non-Arabs
- Barbarian – which came to refer to people who spoke neither Greek nor other "civilized" languages (such as Latin), and derived from a root meaning "speaking incomprehensibly" or "babbling"
- Mleccha – Pre-modern Sanskrit term referring to outsiders, foreigners, barbarians and invaders
- Nemets – the name given to Germany or the German people in many Slavic languages, with a similar derivation to Ajam
- Skræling – Peoples the Norse Greenlanders encountered in North America
- yabancı – stranger or foreigner in Turkish
- gaijin – Japanese term for foreigner
- Operation Dudula – Anti-immigrants vigilante organisation in South Africa
