= Ajam (disambiguation) =

Ajam is an Arabic word meaning "non-Arab".

Ajam or AJAM may also refer to:

== People ==
=== Individuals ===
- Mohammed Ajam (fl. 18th century), Iranian singer
- Radwan Ajam (born 1971), Syrian footballer
- Zar Ajam (1993/94 – 2011), Pakistani mass murderer

=== Groups ===
- Ajam of Bahrain
- Ajam of Iraq
- 'Ajam of Kuwait

== Other uses ==
- Ajam (band), a British world fusion group
- Ajam (maqam), a musical mode in Arabic, Turkish, and related systems of music
- Al Jazeera America (AJAM), an American basic cable and satellite news television channel
- Ajam, Iran (disambiguation)
- Ajam Rural District, a rural district in Kohgiluyeh and Boyer-Ahmad province, Iran

== See also ==
- Ajami (disambiguation)
