= Ajami (disambiguation) =

Ajami is the Arabic adjective applied to an Ajam, a Persian or (relative to Arabic speakers) alien. Ajami may also refer to the following:

== Language ==
- Ajami dialect, a dialect of Persian
- Ajami script, one of the Arabic-based orthographies used for writing African languages
- Ajami Turkic

== Places ==
- Ajami, Iran (disambiguation), villages in Iran
- Ajami Iraq, a historical region spanning parts of western Iran
- Ajami, Jaffa, a neighborhood in Israel
- Ajami, Syria, a village in southern Syria

== Other ==
- Ajami Nakhchivani, a Muslim architect from Azerbaijan and founder of the Nakhchivan school of architecture
- Ajami (surname)
- Ajami (film), a 2009 film

== See also ==
- Ajam (disambiguation)
- Agami, a district of Alexandria, Egypt
