= Ajami (surname) =

The surname Ajami or al-Ajami (Arabic: عجمي ʿajamī) has origins in the Middle East and is prevalent in Arabic speaking countries. Derived from Ajam (عجم) it is an Arabic word meaning mute, which today refers to someone whose mother tongue is not Arabic.

== List of people with the surname ==
- Fouad Ajami (1945 – June 22, 2014) - Lebanese-born American scholar, author and professor
- Ismail al-'Ajami - Persian leader of the Order of Assassins (Nizari Isma'ili sect)
- Newsha Ajami - Iranian-American hydrologist
- Habib al-Ajami - Muslim Sufi (mystic), saint, and traditionalist of Persian descent
- Mohammed al-Ajami - Qatari poet
- Mary Ajami - Syrian Christian academic, was a feminist and pioneering Arabic-language writer
- Jocelyn Ajami - Lebanese-American artist and filmmaker of the 20th and 21st centuries
- Zaynaddin Ibn al-Ajami - Syrian literary and religious scholar

== See also ==
- Ajami (disambiguation)
