= Ajami, Iran =

Ajami (Persian: عجمي), in Iran, may refer to:

- Ajami, Hashtrud, East Azerbaijan Province
- Ajami, West Azerbaijan

== See also ==
- Ajam, Iran (disambiguation)
