= Four Barbarians =

Chinese term for various foreigners living outside the borders of Ancient China

- Zhou dynasty cosmography of Huaxia and the Four Barbarians: Dongyi in the east, Nanman in the south, Xirong in the west, and Beidi in the north.

Chinese name
- Chinese: 四夷
- Literal meaning: four barbarians
Transcriptions
Standard Mandarin
- Hanyu Pinyin: sìyí
- Wade–Giles: ssu-i

Vietnamese name
- Vietnamese alphabet: tứ di
- Hán-Nôm: 四夷

Korean name
- Hangul: 사이
- Hanja: 四夷
Transcriptions
- Revised Romanization: sai
- McCune–Reischauer: sai

Japanese name
- Kanji: 四夷
- Hiragana: しい
Transcriptions
- Revised Hepburn: shii

"Four Barbarians" (Chinese: 四夷; pinyin: sìyí) was a term used by subjects of the Zhou and Han dynasties to refer to the four major people groups living outside the borders of Huaxia. Each was named for a cardinal direction: the Dongyi ("Eastern Barbarians"), Nanman ("Southern Barbarians"), Xirong ("Western Barbarians"), and Beidi ("Northern Barbarians"). Ultimately, the four barbarian groups either emigrated away from the Chinese heartland or were partly assimilated through sinicization into Chinese culture during later dynasties. After this early period, "barbarians" to the north and the west would often be designated as "Hu" (胡).

== Etymology ==
Ancient China was composed of a group of states that arose in the Yellow River valley. According to historian Li Feng, during the Zhou dynasty (c. 1041–771 BCE), the contrast between the 'Chinese' Zhou and the 'non-Chinese' Xirong or Dongyi was "more political than cultural or ethnic". Lothar von Falkenhausen argues that the perceived contrast between "Chinese" and "Barbarians" was accentuated during the Eastern Zhou period (770–256 BCE), when adherence to Zhou rituals became increasingly recognised as a "barometer of civilisation"; a meter for sophistication and cultural refinement. The Chinese began making a distinction between China (Hua) and the barbarians (Yi) during that period. Huaxia, the earliest concept of "China", was at the center of tianxia ("[everywhere] under heaven; the world"). It was surrounded by "Four Directions/Corners" (四方; sìfāng), "Four Lands/Regions" (四土; sìtǔ), "Four Seas", and "Four Barbarians/Foreigners". The text Erya from the late Zhou dynasty defines the Four Seas as " the place where the barbarians lived, hence by extension, the Four Barbarians... are called the four seas".

The Four Barbarians were the Yi to the east of China, Man in the south, Rong in the west, and Di in the north. (Note: William H. Baxter and Laurent Sagart reconstruct the Old Chinese names of the four barbarian tribes as: 夷 *ləj (eastern foreigners); 蠻 *mˤro[n] (southern foreigners); 戎 *nuŋ (western foreigners); 狄 *lˤek (northern foreigners)) Scholars such as Herrlee Glessner Creel argue that Yi, Man, Rong, and Di were originally Chinese names of particular ethnic groups or tribes. During the Spring and Autumn period (771–476 BC), these four exonyms were expanded into "general designations referring to the barbarian tribes" in a given cardinal direction. For example, "Yi" became "Dongyi", literally meaning "East(ern) Yi". (Note: The names Yi, Man, Rong, and Di were further generalized into compounds (such as Rongdi, Manyi, and Manyirongdi) denoting "non-Chinese; foreigners; barbarians." Traditional Chinese characters for these terms all include a radical meaning "animal/insect". simplified characters use the radical meaning "dog" instead.) The Russian anthropologist Mikhail Kryukov concludes:

This would, in the final analysis, mean that once again territory had become the primary criterion of the we-group, whereas the consciousness of common origin remained secondary. What continued to be important were the factors of language, the acceptance of certain forms of material culture, the adherence to certain rituals, and, above all, the economy and the way of life. Agriculture was the only appropriate way of life for the [Huaxia].

Oracle bone script for shi 尸 "corpse" and yi 夷 "barbarian"

In Chinese, the term "Four Barbarians" uses the character for Yi (夷). The sinologist Edwin G. Pulleyblank states that the name Yi "furnished the primary Chinese term for 'barbarian'," despite paradoxically being "considered the most civilized of the non-Chinese peoples." (Note: Yi was used both for the names of specific barbarian groups (e.g., the Huaiyi, meaning "Huai River barbarians") and generalized references to "barbarian") Yi is the Modern Chinese pronunciation. The Old Chinese pronunciation is reconstructed as *‍dyər (Bernhard Karlgren), *ɤier (Zhou Fagao), *ləj (William H. Baxter), and *l(ə)i (Axel Schuessler). Schuessler defines Yi as "The name of non-Chinese tribes, prob[ably] Austroasiatic, to the east and southeast of the central plain (Shandong, Huái River basin), since the Spring and Autumn period also a general word for 'barbarian'", and proposes a "sea" etymology, "Since the ancient Yuè (=Viet) word for 'sea' is said to have been yí, the people's name might have originated as referring to people living by the sea".

The modern character for yi (夷), like the Qin dynasty seal script, is composed of 大 "big" and 弓 "bow" – but the earliest Shang dynasty oracle bone script was used interchangeably for yi and shi 尸 "corpse", depicting a person with bent back and dangling legs. The archeologist and scholar Guo Moruo believed the oracle graph for yi denotes "a dead body, i.e., the killed enemy", while the bronze graph denotes "a man bound by a rope, i.e., a prisoner or slave". Ignoring this historical paleography, the Chinese historian K. C. Wu claimed that Yi should not be translated as "barbarian" because the modern graph implies a big person carrying a bow, someone to perhaps be feared or respected, but not to be despised. The scholar Léon Wieger provided multiple definitions to the term yi: “The men 大 armed with bows 弓, the primitive inhabitants, barbarians, borderers of the Eastern Sea, inhabitants of the South-West countries." Hanyu Da Cidian, a major Chinese language dictionary, notes Siyi as derogatory: 古代華夏族对四方小数民族的統称. 含有轻蔑之意.; "Contrasting with the ancient Chinese people, a name for ethnic minorities in all four directions. Contains a pejorative meaning."

"Four barbarians" is the common English translation of Siyi. Compare these Chinese-English dictionary equivalents for Siyi: "the four barbarian tribes on the borders of ancient China", "the barbarians on borders of China", and "four barbarian tribes on the borders". Some scholars interpret the si "four" in Siyi as sifang (四方 "four directions"). Liu Xiaoyuan says the meaning of Siyi "is not 'four barbarians' but numerous 'barbarous tribes' in the four directions". However, Liu also states that the term yi might have been used by the early Chinese to simply mean "ordinary others". Yuri Pines translates Siyi as "barbarians of the four corners".

In Chinese Buddhism, siyi (四夷) or siyijie (四夷戒) abbreviates the si boluoyi (四波羅夷) "Four Parajikas" (grave offenses that entail expulsion of a monk or nun from the sangha).

== Western Zhou usages ==
Bronze inscriptions and reliable documents from the Western Zhou period (c. 1046–771 BCE) used the word Yi in two meanings, says Chinese sinologist Chen. First, Yi or Yifang (夷方) designated a specific ethnic group that had battled against the Shang since the time of King Wu Ding. Second, Yi meant specifically or collectively (e.g., zhuyi 諸夷) peoples in the remote lands east and south of China, such as the well-known Dongyi (東夷), Nanyi (南夷), and Huaiyi (淮夷). Western Zhou bronzes also record the names of some little-known Yi groups, such as the Qiyi (杞夷), Zhouyi (舟夷), Ximenyi (西門夷), Qinyi (秦夷), and Jingyi (京夷). Chen notes, "These yi are not necessarily identical with the numerous yi in Eastern Zhou literature. On the contrary, except for the Huaiyi, Dongyi and Nanyi, these yi all seem to have vanished from the historical and inscriptional accounts of the Eastern Zhou".

Inscriptions on bronze gui vessels (including the Xun 詢, Shiyou 師酉, and Shi Mi 史密) do not always use the term yi exclusively in reference to alien people of physically different ethnic groups outside China. According to Chen, "yi" was also used for "certain groups of people residing in places within the region of Zhou control".

Expanding upon the research of Li Ling that Western Zhou bronze writings differentiate the Zhou people (Wangren 王人, lit. "king's people") from other peoples (yi 夷), Chen found three major categories: people of Zhou, people of Shang, and people of Yi (neither Zhou nor Shang). "The Zhou rulers treated the Shang remnant elites with courtesy and tolerance, whereas they treated yi people with less respect." Shang people were employed in positions based upon their cultural legacy and education, such as zhu 祝 "priest", zong 宗 "ritual official", bu 卜 "diviner", shi 史 "scribe", and military commander. Yi people, who had a much lower status, served the rulers in positions such as infantry soldiers, palace guards, servants, and slave laborers. Chen compares the social status of Yi with "xiangren 降人, people captured from other states or ethnicities, or their descendants".

Chen analyzed diachronic semantic changes in the twin concepts of Xia and Yi. During the Western Zhou, they were employed to distinguish "between the Zhou elite and non-Zhou people"; during the Eastern Zhou, they distinguished "between the central states and peripheral barbarian tribes in a geographical sense, as well as between Zhou subjects and non-Zhou subjects in a political sense." Eastern Zhou canonical texts, says Chen, "frequently assert a differentiation between Xia (or Zhongguo), meaning those states in the central plains subject to the Zhou sovereign, and Yi 夷, Di 狄, Rong 戎, and Man 蠻, all of which could be used generally to refer to non-Chinese ethnic groups". Among these four terms, Yi was most widely employed for "barbarian" clans, tribes, or ethnic groups. The Chinese classics used it in directional compounds (e.g., "eastern" Dongyi 東夷, "western" Xiyi 西夷, "southern" Nanyi, and "northern" Beiyi 北夷), numerical (meaning "many") generalizations ("three" Sanyi 三夷, "four" Siyi 四夷, and "nine" Jiuyi 九夷), and groups in specific areas and states (Huaiyi 淮夷, Chuyi 楚夷, Qinyi 秦夷, and Wuyi 吳夷).

Historians Liu Junping and Huang Deyuan describe how early Chinese monarchs used the concept of the Four Barbarians to justify their rule. Just how heaven (yang) was matched with the inferior earth (yin), "the Chinese as an entity was matched with the inferior ethnic groups surrounding it in its four directions so that the kings could be valued and the barbarians could be rejected." Lius and Huang propose that later Chinese ideas about the "nation" and "state" of China evolved from the "casual use of such concepts as "Tianxia"...and "Four Barbarians"."

== Eastern Zhou usages ==
The Chinese classics contain many references to the Siyi "Four Barbarians". Around the late Spring and Autumn period (771–476 BCE) or early Warring States period (475–221 BCE), the names Man, Yi, Rong, and Di became firmly associated with the cardinal directions. Yi changed from meaning a specific "barbarians in the east" to "barbarians" generally, and two new words – Siyi and Man-Yi-Rong-Di 蠻夷戎狄 – referred to "all non-Zhou barbarians in the four directions". The Zuozhuan and Mozi contain the earliest extant occurrences of Siyi.

The (early 4th century BCE) Zuozhuan commentary to the Chunqiu ("Spring and Autumn Annals") uses Siyi four times.

The affair [presenting Rong prisoners and spoils of war to Duke Zhuang] was contrary to rule. When a prince has gained success over any of the wild tribes, he presents the spoils to the king, who employs them to terrify other tribes.

It is virtue by which the people of the Middle State are cherished; it is by severity that the wild tribes around are awed.

I have heard that, when the officers of the son of Heaven are not properly arranged, we may learn from the wild tribes all about.

Anciently, the defenses of the sons of Heaven were the rude tribes on every side of the kingdom; and when their authority became low, their defenses were the various States.

In addition, the Zuozhuan has an early usage of Man-Yi-Rong-Di 蠻夷戎狄 meaning "all kinds of barbarians".

When any of the wild tribes, south, east, west, or north, do not obey the king's commands, and by their dissoluteness and drunkenness are violating all the duties of society, the king gives command to attack them.

The (c. 4th century BCE) Mozi has one occurrence of Siyi referring to King Wu of Zhou.

After King Wu had conquered the Shang dynasty and received the gifts bestowed by God, he assigned guardians to the various spirits, instituted sacrifices to Zhou's ancestors, the former kings of Shang, and opened up communications with the barbarians of the four quarters, so that there was no one in the world who did not pay him allegiance.

The (c. 4th century BCE) Guanzi recounts how Duke Huan of Qi (d. 643 BCE) conquered all his enemies, including the Dongyi 東夷, Xirong 西戎, Nanman 南蠻, and Beidi 北狄.

Further to the west, he subjugated the Western Yu, of Liusha and for the first time the Rong people of Qin were obedient. Therefore, even, though the soldiers went forth only once, their great accomplishments [victories] numbered twelve, and as a consequence none of the eastern Yi, western Rong, southern Man, northern Di, or the feudal lords of the central states failed to submit.

This text also recommends, "To use the states bordering the four seas to attack other states bordering the four seas is a condition distinguishing the central states."

The (c. 4th century BCE) Confucian Analects does not use Siyi, but does use Jiuyi 九夷 "Nine Barbarians" (9/19), "The Master wanted to settle among the Nine Wild Tribes of the East. Someone said, I am afraid you would find it hard to put up with their lack of refinement. The Master said, Were a true gentleman to settle among them there would soon be no trouble about lack of refinement." Yidi 夷狄 "Eastern and Northern Barbarians" occurs twice, "The Master said, The barbarians of the East and North have retained their princes. They are not in such a state of decay as we in China"; "The Master said, In private life, courteous, in public life, diligent, in relationships, loyal. This is a maxim that no matter where you may be, even amid the barbarians of the east or north, may never be set aside." This text has an indirect reference to "barbarians" (5/6), "The Master said, The Way makes no progress. I shall get upon a raft and float out to sea."

The (c. 290 BCE) Confucianist Mencius (1A/7) uses Siyi once when Mencius counsels King Xuan of Qi (r. 319–301 BCE) against territorial expansion: "You wish to extend your territory, to enjoy the homage of Ch'in and Ch'u, to rule over the Central Kingdoms and to bring peace to the barbarian tribes on the four borders. Seeking the fulfillment of such an ambition by such means as you employ is like looking for fish by climbing a tree." This text (3A/4) uses Yi 夷 in quoting Confucius, "I have heard of the Chinese converting barbarians to their ways, but not of their being converted to barbarian ways."

The Mencius uses western Xiyi 西夷 four times (three contrasting with northern Beidi 北狄), eastern Dongyi 東夷 once, and Yidi 夷狄 once. Three repeated Xiyi occurrences (1B/11) describe Tang of Shang establishing the Shang dynasty: "With this he gained the trust of the Empire, and when he marched on the east, the western barbarians complained, and when he marched on the south, the northern barbarians complained. They all said, 'Why does he not come to us first?'" Dongyi occurs in a claim (4B/1) that the legendary Chinese sages Shun and King Wen of Zhou were Yi: "Mencius said, 'Shun was an Eastern barbarian; he was born in Chu Feng, moved to Fu Hsia, and died in Ming T'iao. Ken Wen was a Western barbarian; he was born in Ch'i Chou and died in Pi Ying." Yidi occurs in context (3B/9) with the Duke of Zhou, "In ancient times, Yu controlled the Flood and brought peace to the Empire; the Duke of Chou subjugated the northern and southern barbarians, drove away the wild animals, and brought security to the people."

The (c. 3rd century BCE) Xunzi uses Siyi twice in one chapter.

If your deportment is respectful and reverent, your heart loyal and faithful, if you use only those methods sanctioned by ritual principles and moral duty, and if your emotional disposition is one of love and humanity, then though you travel throughout the empire, and though you find yourself reduced to living among the Four Yi 夷 tribes, everyone would consider you to be an honorable person. If you strive to be the first to undertake toilsome and bitter tasks and can leave pleasant and rewarding tasks to others, if you are proper, diligent, sincere, and trustworthy, if you take responsibility and oversee it meticulously, then wherever you travel in the civilized world and though you find yourself reduced to living with the Four Tribes, everyone would be willing to entrust you with official duties.

John Knoblock notes, "The 'Four Yi tribes' refers to the barbarians surrounding the Chinese "Middle Kingdom" and does not designate particular peoples". The Xunzi uses Man-Yi-Rong-Di once.

Accordingly, [諸夏] all the states of Xia Chinese have identical obligations for service to the king and have identical standards of conduct. The countries of Man, Yi, Rong, and Di barbarians perform the same obligatory services to the kind, but the regulations governing them are not the same. … The Man and Yi nations do service according to treaty obligations. The Rong and Di do irregular service.

The (3rd–1st centuries BCE) Liji uses Siyi once.

But if it be his character, when he finds men of ability, to be jealous and hate them; and, when he finds accomplished and perspicacious men, to oppose them and not allow their advancement, showing himself really not able to bear them: such a minister will not be able to protect my sons and grandsons and people; and may he not also be pronounced dangerous to the state?" It is only the truly virtuous man who can send away such a man and banish him, driving him out among the barbarous tribes around, determined not to dwell along with him in the Middle Kingdom.

The Liji also gives detailed information about the Four Barbarian peoples.

The people of those [wufang 五方] five regions – the Middle states, and the Rong, Yi, (and other wild tribes round them) – had all their several natures, which they could not be made to alter. The tribes on the east were called Yi. They had their hair unbound, and tattooed their bodies. Some of them ate their food without its being cooked. Those on the south were called Man. They tattooed their foreheads, and had their feet turned in towards each other. Some of them (also) ate their food without its being cooked. Those on the west were called Rong. They had their hair unbound, and wore skins. Some of them did not eat grain-food. Those on the north were called Di. They wore skins of animals and birds, and dwelt in caves. Some of them also did not eat grain-food. The people of the Middle states, and of those Yi, Man, Rong, and Di, all had their dwellings, where they lived at ease; their flavours which they preferred; the clothes suitable for them; their proper implements for use; and their vessels which they prepared in abundance. In those five regions, the languages of the people were not mutually intelligible, and their likings and desires were different. To make what was in their minds apprehended, and to communicate their likings and desires, (there were officers) – in the east, called transmitters; in the south, representationists; in the west, Di-dis; and in the north, interpreters.

The Shujing history uses Siyi in two forged "Old Text" chapters.

Yi said, 'Alas! be cautious! Admonish yourself to caution, when there seems to be no occasion for anxiety. Do not fail to observe the laws and ordinances. … Do not go against what is right, to get the praise of the people. Do not oppose the people's (wishes), to follow your own desires. (Attend to these things) without idleness or omission, and the barbarous tribes all around will come and acknowledge your sovereignty.'

The king said, 'Oh! Grand-Master, the security or the danger of the kingdom depends on those officers of Yin. If you are not (too) stern with them nor (too) mild, their virtue will be truly cultivated. … The penetrating power of your principles, and the good character of your measures of government, will exert an enriching influence on the character of the people, so that the wild tribes, with their coats buttoning on the left, will all find their proper support in them, and I, the little child, will long enjoy much happiness.

The (c. 239 BCE) Lüshi Chunqiu has two occurrences of Siyi.

Seeking depth, not breadth, reverently guarding one affair … When this ability is utterly perfect, the barbarian Yi states of the four quarters are tranquil. (17/5)

If your desires are not proper and you use them to govern your state, it will perish. Therefore, the sage-kings of antiquity paid particular attention to conforming to the endowment Heaven gave them in acting on their desires; all the people, therefore, could be commanded and all their accomplishments were firmly established. "The sage-kings held fast to the One, and the barbarians of the four directions came to them" refers to this. (19/6)

The Daoist Zhuangzi uses Siyi twice in the (c. 3rd century BCE) "Miscellaneous Chapters".

The sword of the son of heaven has a point made of Swallow Gorge and Stone Wall … It is embraced by the four uncivilized tribes, encircled by the four seasons, and wrapped around by the Sea of Po. (30)

Master Mo declared, "Long ago, when Yü was trying to stem the flood waters, he cut channels from the Yangtze and the Yellow rivers and opened communications with the four uncivilized tribes and the nine regions. (33)

== Han usages ==
Many texts dating from the Han dynasty (206 BCE-220 CE) used the ethnonyms Yi and Siyi.

For example, the (139 BCE) Huainanzi, which is an eclectic compilation attributed to Liu An, uses Siyi "Four Barbarians" in three chapters (and Jiuyi "Nine Barbarians" in two).

Yu understood that the world had become rebellious and thereupon knocked down the wall [built by his father Gun to protect Xia], filled in the moat surrounding the city, gave away their resources, burned their armor and weapons, and treated everyone with beneficence. And so the lands beyond the Four Seas respectfully submitted, and the four Yi tribes brought tribute. (1.6)

The Three Miao [tribes] bind their heads with hemp; the Qiang people bind their necks: the [people of] the Middle Kingdom use hat and hatpin; the Yue people shear their hair. In regard to getting dressed, they are as one. … Thus the rites of the four Yi ["barbarians"] are not the same, [yet] they all revere their ruler, love their kin, and respect their elder brothers. (11.7)

When Shun was the Son of Heaven, he plucked the five-stringed qin and chanted the poems of the "Southern Airs" [a Shijing section], and thereby governed the world. Before the Duke of Zhou had gathered provisions or taken the bells and drums from their suspension cords, the four Yi tribes submitted. (20.16)

Thus when the Son of Heaven attains the Way, he is secure [even] among the four Yi [tribes of "barbarians"]; when the son of Heaven loses the way, he is secure [only] among the Lords of the Land. (20.29)

References to the "Four Barbarians" are especially common among Han-era histories; Siyi occurs 18 times in the Shiji, 62 in the Han Shu, and 30 in the Hou Han Shu.

To evaluate the traditional "civilized vs. barbarian" dichotomy that many scholars use as a blanket description of Chinese attitudes towards outsiders, Erica Brindley examined how the Chinese classics ethnically described the southern Yue peoples. Brindley found that many early authors presented the Yue in various ways and not in a simplistic manner. For instance, Sima Qian's (c. 109–91 BCE) Shiji history traces the Chinese lineage of King Goujian of Yue back to Yu the Great, legendary founder of the Xia dynasty (41): "Gou Jian, the king of Yue, was the descendant of Yu and the grandson of Shao Kang of the Xia. He was enfeoffed at Kuaiji and maintained ancestral sacrifices to Yu. [The Yue] tattooed their bodies, cut their hair short, and cleared out weeds and brambles to set up small fiefs." On the one hand, this statement conceptualizes the Yue people through alien habits and customs, but on the other, through kinship-based ethnicity. Sima Qian also states (114): "Although the Yue are considered to be southern (man 蠻) barbarians (yi 夷), is it not true that their ancestors had once benefited the [Yue] people with their great merit and virtue?" Sima denigrates the Yue by calling them “Man Yi,” but he also "counterbalances such language and descriptions by proving the honor of Yue ancestry and certain of its individual members."

Brindley further notes that,

I translate "Man Yi" above as "Southern barbarian," and not just as the Man and Yi peoples, because it is clear that Sima Qian does not think of them as two distinct groups. Rather, it appears that the term Yi does not point to any particular group … but to a vague category of degraded other. Man, on the other hand, denotes not the specific name of the group ("Yue") but the general southern location of this specific derogatory other. In the literary tradition, the four directions (north, south, east, west) are linked with four general categories of identification denoting a derogatory other (di, man, yi, rong).

In the end, Brindley concludes that,

Much scholarship dealing with the relationship between self and other in Chinese history assumes a simple bifurcation between civilized Chinese or Han peoples and the barbarian other. In this analysis of the concepts of the Yue and Yue ethnicity, I show that such a simple and value-laden categorization did not always exist, and that some early authors differentiated between themselves and others in a much more complicated and, sometimes, conflicted manner.

The complexities of the meaning and usage of Yi is also shown in the Hou Han Shu, where in its chapter on the Dongyi, the books describes the Dongyi countries as places where benevolence rules and the gentlemen do not die.

The Shuowen Jiezi (121 CE) character dictionary, defines yi as "men of the east” (東方之人也).

== Later usages ==
Chinese Yi "barbarian" and Siyi continued to be used long after the Han dynasty, as illustrated by the following examples from the Ming dynasty (1368–1644) and Qing dynasty (1644–1912).

The Dutch sinologist Kristofer Schipper cites a (c. 5th–6th century) Celestial Masters Daoist document (Xiaren Siyi shou yaolu 下人四夷受要籙) that substitutes Qiang 羌 for Man 蠻 in the Sìyí.

Chinese: 四夷館; pinyin: Sìyí guǎn; lit. 'Four Barbarians building' was the name of the Ming imperial "Bureau of Translators" for foreign tributary missions to China. Norman Wild says that in the Zhou dynasty, interpreters were appointed to deal with envoys bringing tribute or declarations of loyalty. The Liji records regional "interpreter" words for the Sìyí: ji 寄 for the Dongyi, xiang 象 for the Nanman, didi 狄鞮 for the Xirong, and yi 譯 for the Beidi. In the Sui, Tang, and Song dynasties, tributary affairs were handled by the Sìfāng guǎn lit. 'Four corners/directions building'. The Ming Yongle Emperor established the 四夷館; Sìyí guǎn "Bureau of Translators" for foreign diplomatic documents in 1407, as part of the imperial Hanlin Academy. Ming histories also mention Huárén Yíguān 華人夷官 "Chinese barbarian officials" denoting people of Chinese origin employed by rulers of the "barbarian vassal states" in their tributary embassies to China. When the Qing dynasty revived the Ming Sìyíguǎn 四夷館, the Manchus, who "were sensitive to references to barbarians", changed the name from pejorative yí 夷 "barbarian" to yí 彝 "Yi people (a Chinese ethnic minority)".

In 1656, the Qing imperial court issued an edict to Mongolia about a territorial dispute, "Those barbarians (fanyi) who paid tribute to Mongolia during the Ming should be administered by Mongolia. However, those barbarians submitting to the former Ming court should be subjects of China"

After China began expansion into Inner Asia, Gang Zhao says, "Its inhabitants were no longer to be considered barbarians, a term suitable for the tributary countries, and an error on this score could be dangerous." In a 1787 memorial sent to the Qianlong Emperor, the Shaanxi governor mistakenly called a Tibetan mission an yísh3 夷使 "barbarian mission". The emperor replied, "Because Tibet has long been incorporated into our territory, it is completely different from Russia, which submits to our country only in name. Thus, we cannot see the Tibetans as foreign barbarians, unlike the Russians".

The use of Yí 夷 continued into modern times. The Oxford English Dictionary defines barbarian (3.c) as, "Applied by the Chinese contemptuously to foreigners", and cites the 1858 Treaty of Tientsin prohibiting the Chinese from calling the British "Yí". (Article LI) states, "It is agreed, that henceforward the character "I" 夷 ('barbarian') shall not be applied to the Government or subjects of Her Britannic Majesty, in any Chinese official document." This prohibition in the Treaty of Tientsin had been the end result of a long dispute between the Qing and British officials regarding the translation, usage and meaning of Yí. Many Qing officials argued that the term did not mean “barbarians,” but their British counterparts disagreed with this opinion. Using the linguistic concept of heteroglossia, Lydia Liu analyzed the significance of yí in Articles 50 and 51 as a "super-sign":

The law simply secures a three-way commensurability of the hetero-linguistic sign 夷/i/barbarian by joining the written Chinese character, the romanized pronunciation, and the English translation together into a coherent semantic unit. [Which] means that the Chinese character yi becomes a hetero-linguistic sign by virtue of being informed, signified, and transformed by the English word "barbarian" and must defer its correct meaning to the foreign counterpart. ... That is to say, whoever violates the integrity of the super-sign 夷/i/barbarian ... risks violating international law itself.

== See also ==
- Four Perils, which included "barbarian" tribes in ancient Chinese history
- Five Barbarians, later groups that settled in northern China
