= Jocelyn Ajami =

Lebanese-American artist

- Born: 1950 (age 75–76); Caracas, Venezuela
- Occupations: Artist and filmmaker

Jocelyn Ajami (born 1950) is a Lebanese-American artist and filmmaker.

== Early life ==
Jocelyn Ajami was born and raised in Caracas, Venezuela to a Lebanese Greek Orthodox family. She emigrated to the United States as a child in 1961. She graduated from Manhattanville College with a Bachelor of Fine Arts degree, and later earned master's degrees in painting and art history from the arm of Rosary College located at Villa Schifanoia in Italy, near Florence.

== Career ==
Ajami began her career as a fine artist. Her abstract geometric paintings and drawings, which included large works such as the 10 feet (3.0 m) by 6 feet (1.8 m) "Eros-Thantos", has been exhibited at Studio 36 (a studio gallery in Boston she founded), as well as Chapel Gallery, Clark Gallery, Mercury Gallery, the Brockton and Fitchburg art museums, and at solo exhibitions in Boston, New York City, and Florence, Italy.

Jocelyn Ajami’s art is about coexistence – aesthetic, political and philosophical. The angle lives with the curve in her work; the two dimensional with the three, The Arab with the Jew.

— Christine Temin, Boston Globe

Ajami turned to producing and writing documentary films and experimental videos in 1991. Her first video, the experimental "The Tiger and the Cube", was exhibited at Boston's Institute of Contemporary Art. After the Gulf War, Ajami made "Jihad", a short video on the meaning of the term "jihad", which Ajami contends refers to the internal struggle to become a good person, not a warlike struggle against other people. This film won an honorable mention at the 1992 American Film and Video Festival. Her documentary "Oasis of Peace", about an Israeli village where Jews and Palestinians live together in harmony, was premiered at the Museum of Modern Art in New York City in 1995 and won the Merit Finalist Award from the Houston International Film Festival.

In 1996 Ajami was awarded a 12-month Leadership Foundation Fellowship by the International Women's Forum in conjunction with the John F. Kennedy School of Government. Her 1998 documentary "Gypsy Heart" examined Flamenco dance and culture and premiered at the Museum of Fine Arts in Boston. Ajami followed this with "Queen of the Gypsies" in 2002, a documentary biography of Flamenco dancer Carmen Amaya. This film won several awards. In 2008 Ajami made "Postcard from Lebanon", about the aftermath of the 2006 Lebanon War. She won a grant from the Richard H. Driehaus Foundation to show the film at the Dublin Diplomatic Conference on Cluster Munitions where she also campaigned against cluster bombs.

Ajami turned to writing poetry in 2014 as a way of connecting more intimately with issues of social conscience and cultural awareness. She has been published in the Ekphrastic Review, Modern Haiku, Frogpond, Encore, bottle rockets press, Northern Colorado Writers and various anthologies of prize winning poems. She has performed her spoken word pieces at The Green Mill, The American Writer’s Museum, The Lizard Lounge and the Poetry Foundation among others. She has been the recipient of ten awards including the founders Award for her poem Un Deseo, published in Encore by the National Society of State Poetry Societies in 2018.

She is related to the famous Syrian feminist and pioneering Arabic-language writer Mary Ajami through her great-grandfather, Abdou Yusif Ajami.

== Works ==
Filmography

- "The Tiger and the Cube" (1991), writer/director/producer
- "Jihad", (1992), writer/director/producer
- "Oasis of Peace" (1995), writer/director/producer
- "Gypsy Heart" (1998), writer/director/producer
- "Queen of the Gypsies" (2002), writer/director/producer
- "Postcard from Lebanon" (2008), writer/director/producer
- "Human Heart Explodes" (2009), as herself

Artworks

- "Eros-Thantos" (1987), colored pencil on paper
- "See No Evil, Hear No Evil, Speak No Evil" (2013)

Publications

- Ajami, Jocelyn M. (November 1993). "A Hidden Treasure". Saudi Aramco World. 44 (6). Aramco: 2–9.
- Ajami, Jocelyn M. (July 1996). "Jordan's House of the Arts". Saudi Aramco World. 47 (4). Aramco: 2–7.
