= Ajam, Iran =

Ajam (Persian: عجم) may refer to:

- Ajam, Bushehr
- Ajam Rural District, in Kohgiluyeh and Boyer-Ahmad Province

== See also ==
- Ajami, Iran (disambiguation)
