= Mohammed Ajam =

18th-century iranian singer

Mohammad Ajam, alternatively known as Muhammad al-Ajami or Ajam Muhammad, was an Iranian singer who lived in the late 18th century. He came to Baghdad during the Mamluk dynasty of Ottoman occupation. During the reign of Sulayman Abu Layla Pasha, he worked in politics until he reached the position of advisor and became the minister of Treasury in the time of Omar Pasha (1762–1776). He later became the leader of a rebel movement against Ottoman authority, which was defeated. He fled to Iran, then Egypt where he died. A melody type or Arabic maqam called ajam became common in Baghdad after him.

== Early life ==
He went to Baghdad during the reign of its Ottoman ruler. He was a handsome young man with an excellent voice and formed a music choir with his mother and sister. His sister danced and his mother played the tambourine while he sang. He soon became famous in Iraq.

== Political career ==
Mohammad Ajam's choir became famous in Baghdad as senior officials and notables came to it. He became a mediator and counselor for the people in their cases, receiving gifts, and became one of the closest to the state and its senior officials. After the killing of Omar Pasha, Mustafa Pasha assumed the governorship of Baghdad. Mohammad Ajam became the treasurer and advisor to the governor. During the era of Abdullah Pasha, he acquired money from the treasury under the pretext of fighting the Persians in Basra.

=== Basra occupied by Iran ===
Basra's occupation by the Iranian army during the time of Omar Pasha was cause of collapse of his rule. Basra was, for a long time, a flourishing commercial and cultural center. It was captured by the Ottoman Empire in 1668. It was fought over by Turks and Persians and was the scene of repeated attempts at resistance. From 1697 to 1701, Basra was once again under Safavid control.

In 1774, the Mamluk governor of the Ottoman province of Iraq, Omar Pasha began meddling in the affairs of his vassal principality of Baban, which since the death of his predecessor Sulayman Abu Layla Pasha in 1762, had fallen more and more under the influence of the Zand governor of Ardalan, Khosrow Khan Bozorg. This made Omar Pasha dismiss the Baban ruler Muhammad Pasha, and appoint Abdolla Pasha as its new ruler. This, and Omar Pasha's seizure of the remnants of Iranian pilgrims who had died during the plague that ravaged Iraq in 1773—and his exaction of payment from Iranian pilgrims to visit the holy Shia places of Najaf and Karbala, gave Karim Khan Zand the casus belli to declare war against the Ottomans. | There were also other reasons for Karim Khan Zand to declare war. The Shia holly city Mashhad was not under his control, so free entry to the sanctuaries of Iraq was of more significance to Karim Khan than it had been to the Safavid and Afsharid shahs. Most importantly, Basra was a prominent trading port, which had surpassed the competing city of Bushehr in Fars in 1769, when the East India Company dropped the city for Basra.

The Zand dynasty under Karim Khan Zand occupied Basra after a 13-month siege in 1775–9. The Zands attempted at introducing the Usuli form of Shiism on the basically Akhbari Shia Basrans. The shortness of the Zand rule rendered this untenable. In 1884 the Ottomans responded to local pressure from the Shi'as of the south by detaching the southern districts of the Baghdad vilayet and creating a new vilayet of Basra.

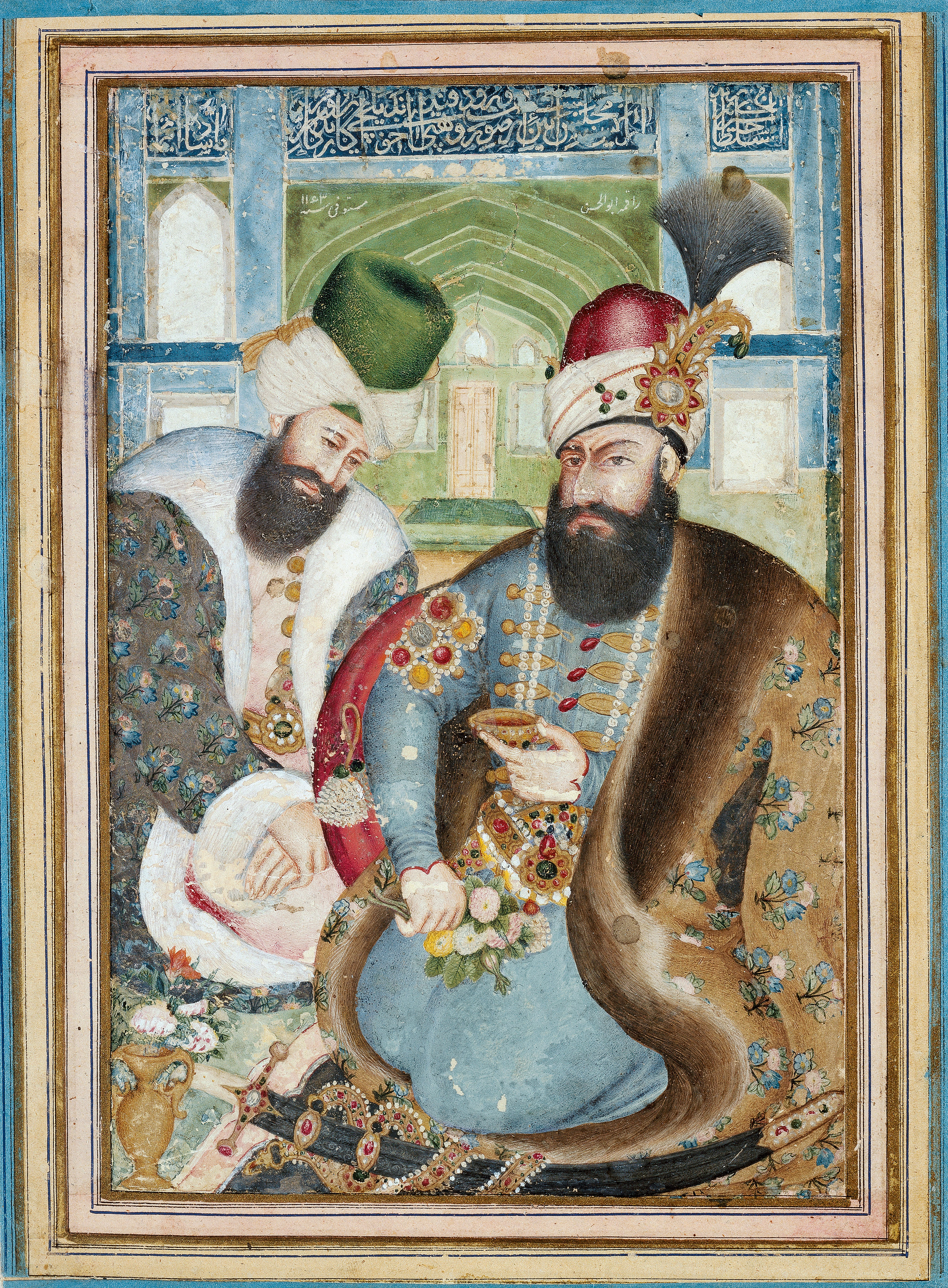
Karim Khan Zand with the Ottoman envoy Vehbi Efendi.

== Rebellion in Baqubah region ==
After the death of Abdullah Pasha in 1777, a competition for power began between Mohammad Ajam and Ismail Agha al-Kahiya, and conflict arose between them. The situation was resolved by the arrival of the new governor of Baghdad Hassan Pasha Karakukli with the decree of his mandate over all Iraq on 1778. Muhammad Ajam fled to the suburbs of Diyala with the help of his friend Ahmed Agha, and from there they began blocking roads and raiding Baghdad after he had recruited with him more than ten thousand men who took control of large areas of Baqubah and all the adjacent regions. The book History of Baghdad written by Ibn Sanad explains the rebellion in Baqubah region and the political life of Mohammed Ajam.

== Death ==
The people besieged the sarai and Governor Hassan Pasha Karakukli was forced to flee from Baghdad in 1779. In 1779, Sulayman the Great (Büyük) or Büzürk returned from his exile in Shiraz and acquired Basrah then seized Baghdad took the governorship of Baghdad, and Shahrizor in 1780. He also attacked Diyala to eliminate Ajam's army, and was ultimately successful. With the title of Sulayman Pasha the Great he became the ruler of Iraq his rule (1780–1802) was efficient at first, but weakened as he grew older. Ajam then fled to Iran and finally to Egypt where he died.

== See also ==
- List of Ottoman grand viziers
- Mamluk dynasty of Iraq
- Outline of Iraq
