= Yevgeni Nemets =

Russian footballer

Personal information
- Full name: Yevgeni Viktorovich Nemets
- Date of birth: 19 January 1973 (age 53)
- Height: 1.78 m (5 ft 10 in)
- Positions: Defender; midfielder

Youth career
- SUOR Stavropol

Senior career*
Years	Team	Apps	(Gls)
1990	FC Sherstyanik Nevinnomyssk (amateur)		
1990	FC Druzhba Budyonnovsk (amateur)		
1991	FC Druzhba Budyonnovsk	0	(0)
1992	FC Niva Slavyansk-na-Kubani	29	(0)
1992	FC Kuban Krasnodar	2	(0)
1993	FC SKA Rostov-on-Don	26	(0)
1994–1996	FC Niva Slavyansk-na-Kubani	82	(1)
1997	FC Kuban Slavyansk-na-Kubani	12	(0)
1997	FC Niva Slavyansk-na-Kubani	12	(0)
1999	FC MKK Korenovsk		
2002	FC Kuban Ust-Labinsk		
2006–2008	FC Kuban Ust-Labinsk		
- * Club domestic league appearances and goals

Yevgeni Viktorovich Nemets (Russian: Евгений Викторович Немец; born 19 January 1973) is a former Russian football player.
