= Ajami, Hashtrud =

Ajami عجمي
- Village
- Location within Iran
- Coordinates: 37°28′56″N 47°12′54″E
- Country: Iran
- Province: East Azerbaijan
- County: Hashtrud
- Bakhsh: Central
- Rural District: Aliabad

Population (2006)
  - Total: 227
- Time zone: UTC+3:30 (IRST)
  - Summer (DST): UTC+4:30 (IRDT)

Ajami (Persian: عجمي, also Romanized as ‘Ajamī) is a village in Aliabad Rural District, in the Central District of Hashtrud County, East Azerbaijan Province, Iran. At the 2006 census, its population was 227, in 39 families.
