= Welcome to Our Hillbrow =

2001 novel by Phaswane Mpe

- Author: Phaswane Mpe
- Language: English
- Genre: Novel
- Publisher: University of Natal Press (South Africa)
- Publication date: 2001
- Publication place: South Africa
- Media type: Print (hardback & paperback)
- ISBN: 978-0-86980-995-2

Welcome to Our Hillbrow is a novel by South African novelist Phaswane Mpe which deals with issues of xenophobia, AIDS, tradition, and inner city status in the Hillbrow neighborhood of post-apartheid Johannesburg. It was first published in 2001.

== Characters ==
Refentše: The main character is Refentše Morrow, who goes through many hardships due to the hectic Johannesburg society that he lives in. He is a professor who is in love with a woman named Lerato. One day he comes home to find his best friend, Sammy, and Lerato having sex. He commits suicide by jumping off a building in Van De Merwe Street.

Refilwe: Refilwe Steffens is a former love interest of Refentše, who left her because she was cheating on him. She never stopped loving him and was devastated by his death. She decided to go to get her Masters in Publishing and Media Studies at Oxford Brookes University in England. While there, she meets a Nigerian river man in a bar, who strikingly resembles Refentše, and falls in love with him. Together they discover that they have been living with AIDS for many years before they even met. Refilwe goes home to her family in the town of Tiragalong to die, but she is judged and persecuted for having AIDS.

Lerato: Refentše's more recent lover. She is caught having sex with his best friend, Sammy. Eventually it is revealed that this sex is markedly accidental; a result of Sammy trying to comfort Lerato when she felt Refentše was growing distant from her. After Refentše commits suicide, she kills herself by overdosing on sleeping pills.

Sammy: Refentše's best friend. Before Refentše moved to Hillbrow, Sammy was in a relationship with Bohlale. He went through a period of drug experimentation that led him to repeatedly have sex with prostitutes, and at one point did this in front of Bohlale. In Refentše's attempt to comfort Bohlale, they ended up having sex. Sammy never found out. Later, similarly while trying to help Lerato with relationship troubles, Sammy sleeps with Refentše's girlfriend. The guilt of causing Refentše to commit suicide ends up driving Sammy mad.

Bohlale: Sammy's girlfriend. After witnessing her boyfriend, Sammy, having sex with a prostitute, she seeks companionship and comfort from Refentše, which leads to her cheating on Sammy with his friend in the heat of the moment. She is later plagued by guilt and wants to tell Sammy, although Refentše is against this as he believes the revelation would add insult to injury as Sammy is already in the hospital. On her way to see Sammy, though, Bohlale is hit by a bus and killed. Refentše never reveals the one-night affair to Sammy.

== Critical reception ==
Publishers Weekly wrote: “Heavily influenced by oral storytelling traditions and yet fully engaged with the world it's set in, this is a powerful novel from a talent cut down unfortunately early.”
