= Phaswane Mpe =

South African poet and novelist

Phaswane Mpe (10 September 1970 – 12 December 2004) was a South African poet and novelist. He was educated at the University of the Witwatersrand, where he was a lecturer in African literature. He did his master's degree in publishing at Oxford Brookes University in 1998. His debut novel, Welcome to Our Hillbrow, was published in 2001. A collection of short stories and poems, Brooding Clouds, was published posthumously in 2008.

Mpe was born in the northern city of Polokwane in Tiragalong, and moved to Johannesburg at the age of 19 to attend university, and ended up living in the deprived inner city area of Hillbrow, a place where he later set his first novel. Welcome to Our Hillbrow was an important work as it was the first novel to deal with the changes of inner-city life in South Africa in the ten years since Nelson Mandela and F. W. de Klerk engineered apartheid's demise. The book depicts the native black South Africans facing the challenges of poverty, unemployment, and HIV/AIDS. The novel is striking in that the problems created by apartheid are in the background; the central problems of black South Africans are those of their own making: xenophobia, mean-spirited gossip, witchcraft, and the inability to fully love each other or themselves.

Perhaps unsurprisingly, considering the prevalence of the disease in South Africa, HIV and AIDS were common themes in Mpe's work. Before his death he embarked on doctorate studies on sexuality in post-apartheid South African literature with a particular focus on these two issues.

Mpe died suddenly at the age of 34, at a time when he was about to begin training as a traditional healer. The cause of death was unknown.

At the time of his death Mpe was teaching African literature and publishing studies in the school of literature and languages studies in the University of the Witwatersrand. His poems and short stories have been published in Imprint (1995), Staff Rider (1980). He also contributed short stories in Drum Magazine.

His book Welcome to Our Hillbrow, and short stories in Brooding Clouds have autobiographical information.
