= Ajami, West Azerbaijan =

Ajami عجمي
- Village
- Country: Iran
- Province: West Azerbaijan
- County: Maku
- Bakhsh: Bazargan
- Rural District: Chaybasar-e Shomali

Population (2006)
  - Total: 20
- Time zone: UTC+3:30 (IRST)
  - Summer (DST): UTC+4:30 (IRDT)

Ajami (Persian: عجمي, also Romanized as ʿAjamī) is a village in Chaybasar-e Shomali Rural District, Bazargan District, Maku County, West Azerbaijan Province, Iran. At the 2006 census, its population was 20, in 5 families.
