= Nemets =

Nemets (Russian: Немец) is a Hungarian and Slavic surname and term literally meaning "German person" in Russian. The Ukrainian equivalent is "Nimets" (Ukrainian: Німець). Many Ukrainian people are known under the Russian surname. Notable people with the surname include:

- Yevgeni Nemets, Russian football player

== Arabic Al-Nemsa ==
Hungarian called Germans West of Becs (Vienna) Nemetz, Ottoman Turks borrowed the term from Hungarian and brought into the Arabic speaking Ottoman states, Modern Turkish switched to the modern name Austria. While Arabic speakers continue to use the Hungarian Ottoman variant Al-Nemsa النمسا.
