= Ajam =

Arabic word for non-Arabs

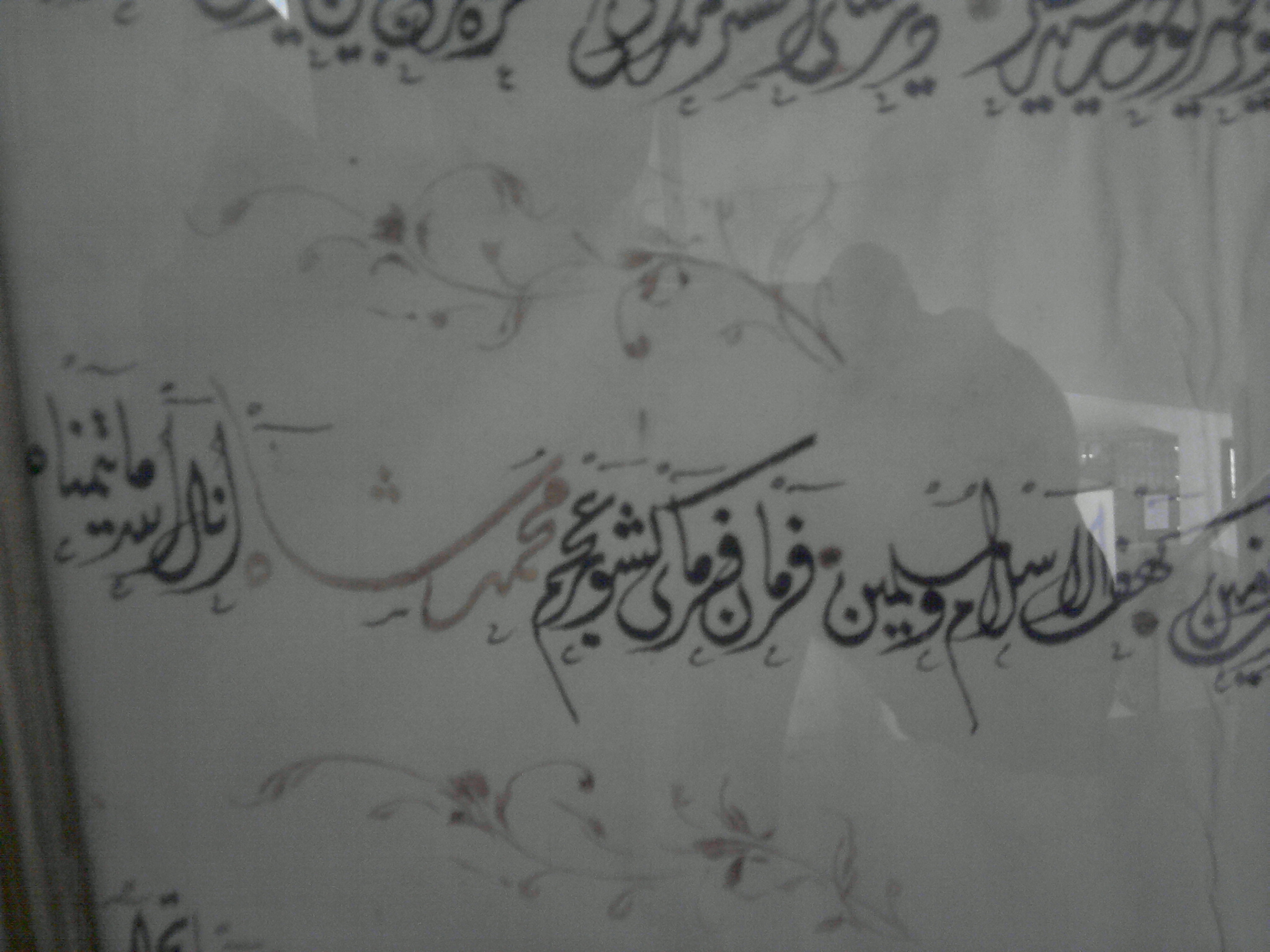
A letter sent into Iran from the Ottoman Empire in 1839, with Keshvâr-e ʿAjam (lit. 'Country of the Mutes') referring to Iranian lands.

ʿAjam (Arabic: عجم, IPA: [ʕædʒæm], lit. 'mute') is an Arabic word for a non-Arab, especially a Persian. It was historically used as a pejorative—figuratively ascribing muteness to those whose native language is not Arabic—during and after the Muslim conquest of Iran. Since the early Muslim conquests, it has been adopted in various non-Arabic languages, such as Turkish, Azerbaijani, Chechen, Kurdish, Malay, Sindhi, Urdu, Hindi, Bengali, Punjabi, Kashmiri, and Swahili. Today, the terms ʿAjam and ʿAjamī continue to be used to refer to anyone or anything Iranian, particularly in the Arab countries of the Persian Gulf. Communities speaking the Persian language in the Arab world exist among the Iraqis, the Kuwaitis, and the Bahrainis, in addition to others. A number of Arabs with Iranian heritage may have the surname ʿAjamī (عجمي), which has the same meaning as the original word.

== Etymology ==
According to traditional etymology, the word Ajam comes from the Semitic root ʿ-j-m. Related forms of the same root include, but are not limited to:

- mustaʿjim: mute, incapable of speech
- ʿajama / ʾaʿjama / ʿajjama: to dot – in particular, to add the dots that distinguish between various Arabic letters to a text (and hence make it easier for a non-native Arabic speaker to read). It is now an obsolete term, since all modern Arabic texts are dotted. This may also be linked to ʿajām / ʿajam "pit, seed (e.g. of a date or grape)".
- inʿajama: (of speech) to be incomprehensible
- istaʿjama: to fall silent; to be unable to speak
- 'aʿjam: non-fluent

Homophonous words, which may or may not be derived from the same root, include:

- ʿajama: to test (a person); to try (a food).

Modern use of "ajam" has the meaning of "non-Arab". Its development from meaning "mute" to meaning "non-Arabic-speaking" is somewhat analogous to that of the word barbarian (from Greek βαρβαρόφωνος barbarophonos, roughly "blah-blah-speaking"), or Nemtsy for Germans in Slavic languages, which descends from Proto-Slavic *němьcь, itself from *němъ meaning "mute". (From there also comes النمسا (an-Namsa), the Arabic name for Austria).

=== Original meaning ===
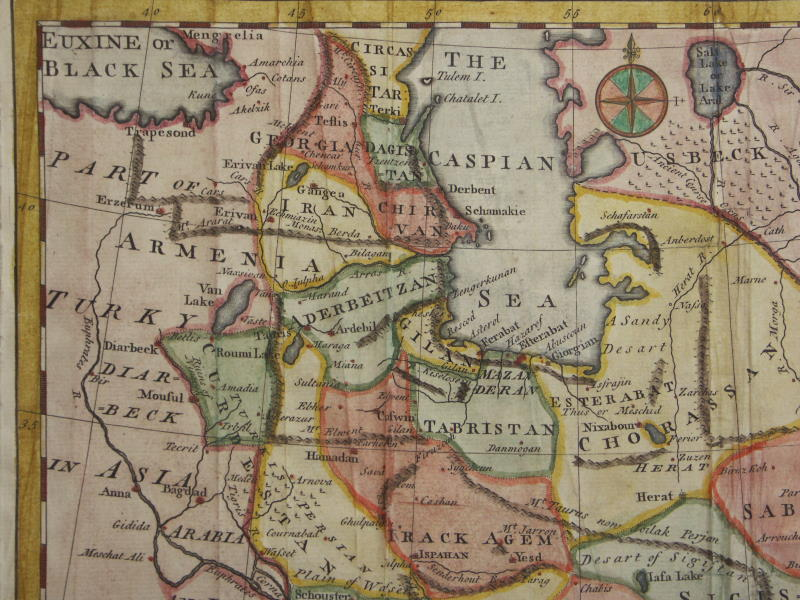
An old map showing the area of Ajam in Arak, Hamadan, Isfahan and Yazd

The verb ʿajama originally meant "to mumble, and speak indistinctly", which is the opposite of ʿaraba, "to speak clearly". Accordingly, the noun ʿujma, of the same root, is the opposite of fuṣḥa, which means "chaste, correct, Arabic language". In general, during the Umayyad period ajam was a pejorative term used by Arabs who believed in their social and political superiority, in early history after Islam. However, the distinction between Arab and Ajam is discernible in pre-Islamic poetry. According to the book Documents on the Persian Gulf's name the Arabs likewise referred to Iran and the Persian (Sassanian) Empire as Bilād Fāris (Arabic: بلاد فارس), which means "Lands of Persia", and using Bilād Ajam (Arabic: بلاد عجم) as an equivalent or synonym to Persia. The Turks also were using bilad (Belaad) e Ajam as an equivalent or synonym to Persian and Iranian, and in the Quran the word ajam was used to refer to non-Arabs. Ajam was first used for people of Persia in the poems of pre-Islamic Arab poets; but after the advent of Islam it also referred to Turks, Zoroastrians, and others. Today, in Arabic literature, Ajam is used to refer to all non-Arabs. As the book Documents on the Persian Gulf's name explained, during the Iranian Intermezzo native Persian Muslim dynasties used both the words Ajam and Persian to refer to themselves. According to The Political Language of Islam, during the Islamic Golden Age, 'Ajam' was used colloquially as a reference to denote those whom Arabs viewed as "alien" or outsiders. The early application of the term included all of the non-Arab peoples with whom the Arabs had contact including Persians, Byzantine Greeks, Ethiopians, Armenians, Mandaeans, Jews, Georgians, Sabians, Egyptians, and Berbers.

During the early age of the Caliphates, Ajam was often synonymous with "foreigner" or "stranger". In Western Asia, it was generally applied to the Persians, while in al-Andalus it referred to speakers of Romance languages – becoming "Aljamiado" in Spanish in reference to Arabic-script writing of those languages – and in West Africa refers to the Ajami script or the writing of local languages such as Hausa and Fulani in the Arabic alphabet. In Zanzibar ajami and ajamo means a Persian person which comes from the Persian Gulf and the cities of Shiraz and Siraf. In Turkish, there are many documents and letters that used Ajam to refer to Persian. In the Persian Gulf region, people still refer to Persians as Ajami, referring to Persian carpets as sajjad al Ajami (Ajami carpet), Persian cats as Ajami cats, and Persian kings as Ajami kings.

== Colloquial use ==
According to Clifford Edmund Bosworth, "by the 3rd/9th century, the non-Arabs, and above all the Persians, were asserting their social and cultural equality (taswīa) with the Arabs, if not their superiority (tafżīl) over them (a process seen in the literary movement of the Šoʿūbīya). In any case, there was always in some minds a current of admiration for the ʿAǰam as heirs of an ancient, cultured tradition of life. After these controversies had died down, and the Persians had achieved a position of power in the Islamic world comparable to their numbers and capabilities, "ʿAjam" became a simple ethnic and geographical designation." Thus by the ninth century, the term was being used by Persians themselves as an ethnic term, and examples can be given by Asadi Tusi in his poem comparing the superiority of Persians and Arabs. Accordingly: "territorial notions of 'Iran' are reflected in such terms as irānšahr, irānzamin, or Faris, the Arabicized form of Pārs/Fārs (Persia). The ethnic notion of 'Iranian' is denoted by the Persian words Pārsi or Irāni, and the Arabic term Ahl Faris (inhabitants of Persia) or ʿAjam, referring to non-Arabs, but primarily to Persians as in molk-e ʿAjam (Persian kingdom) or moluk-e ʿAjam (Persian kings)."

=== As a pejorative for Persians ===
During the Umayyad period, the term developed a derogatory meaning as the word was used to refer to non-Arab speakers (primarily Persians) as illiterate and uneducated. Arab conquerors in that period tried to impose Arabic as the primary language of the subject peoples throughout their empire. Angry with the prevalence of the Persian language in the Divan and Persian society, Persian resistance to this mentality was popularised in the final verse of Ferdowsi's Shahnameh; this verse is widely regarded by Iranians as the primary reason that they speak Persian and not Arabic to this day. Under the Umayyad dynasty, official association with the Arab dominion was only given to those with the ethnic identity of the Arab and required formal association with an Arab tribe and the adoption of the client status. The pejorative use to denote Persians as "Ajam" is so ingrained in the Arab world that it is colloquially used to refer to Persians as "Ajam" neglecting the original definition and etymology of the word.

==== Other non-Arabs ====
According to The Political Language of Islam, during the Islamic Golden Age, 'Ajam' was used colloquially as a reference to denote those whom Arabs in the Arabian Peninsula viewed as "alien" or outsiders. The early application of the term included all of the non-Arab peoples with whom the Arabs had contact including Persians, Byzantine Greeks, Ethiopians, Armenians, Assyrians, Mandaeans, Jews, Georgians, Sabians, Copts, and Berbers.

During the early age of the Caliphates, Ajam was often synonymous with "foreigner" or "stranger". In Western Asia, it was generally applied to the Persians, while in al-Andalus it referred to speakers of Romance languages – becoming "Aljamiado" in Spanish in reference to Arabic-script writing of those languages – and in West Africa refers to the Ajami script or the writing of local languages such as Hausa and Fulani in the Arabic alphabet. In Zanzibar ajami and ajamo mean Persian, which came from the Persian Gulf and the cities of Shiraz and Siraf. In Turkish, there are many documents and letters that used Ajam to refer to the Persians.

In the Persian Gulf region today, people still refer to Persians/Iranians as Ajami, referring to Persian carpets as sajjad al Ajami (Ajami carpet), Persian cat as Ajami cats, and Persian kings as Ajami kings.

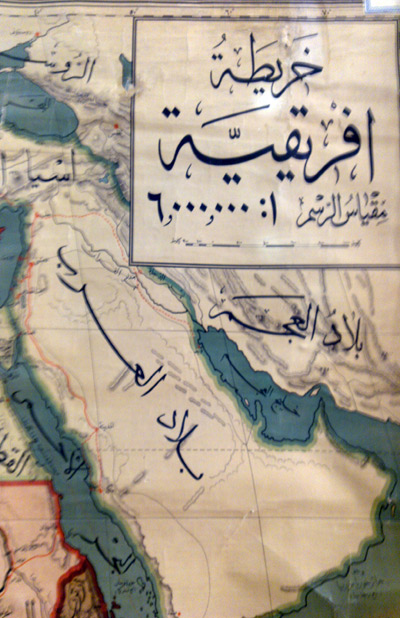
A map published in Ottoman Egypt in 1908, with Iran labelled Bilād al-ʿAjam (lit. 'Land of the Mutes [Persians]') and the Persian Gulf labelled Khalīj al-ʿAjam (lit. 'Gulf of the Mutes [Persia]'), from Al-Azhar University.

== Notable examples ==
- The ethnic Persian community in Kuwait and Bahrain are called Ajami. The term was initially used to refer to speakers of languages derived from Middle, Old and New Persian (Farsi), and especially those of a Shia background, but considering countries like Bahrain has speakers of various different languages (and especially Iranian languages) it can be seen as a broader term encompassing several ethnic groups, it was also considered derogatory by some, those of a Sunni background (particularly Achomis of a Sunni background) are often intentionally conflated with Huwala Arabs, and sometimes refer to their language as either "Ajami" or "Holi."
- 'Ajam was used by the Ottoman Turks to refer to the Safavid dynasty.
- The Abbasid Iraq Al-Ajam province (centered around Arax and Shirvan).
- The Kurdish historian, Sharaf Khan Bidlisi, uses the term Ajam in his book Sharafnama (1597 CE) to refer to the Shia Persians.
- In the Eastern Anatolia region, Azerbaijanis are sometimes referred to as acem (which is the Turkish translation of Ajam).
- Mahmood Reza Ghods claimed modern Sunni Kurds of Iran use this term to denote Persians, Azeris and Southern Kurds. According to Sharhzad Mojab, Ecem (derived from the Arabic ‘ajam) is used by Kurds to refer to Persians and, sometimes, Turks.
- Adjam, Hajjam, Ajaim, Ajami, Akham (as Axam in Spain for ajam), Ayam in Europe.
- It is also used as a surname.
- Azania a word related to the Arabic word ʕajamiyy, meaning "foreign" non speaking Arabic). The Greeks likely reworked the word into a familiar form. It is used to describe some tribes extending from Kenya to Mozambique and perhaps South Africa.

== See also ==
- Barbarian, an originally Greco-Roman word for "uncivilized" people that was borrowed into Arabic and referred to indigenous North Africans during the early Muslim conquests
- Nemets, a Slavic term for Germans that figuratively ascribes muteness to them in the context of their non-Slavic native language
- Goy, 'nation' in Biblical Hebrew, sometimes used as a synonym for 'non-Jew'
- Ajem-Turkic, lit. 'Persian Turkic', precursor of Azerbaijani language
