= Mikhail Kryukov =

Russian anthropologist and historian (1932–2024)

- Михаил Крюков
- Born: 12 July 1932; Moscow, Russian SFSR, USSR
- Died: 19 June 2024 (aged 91); Beijing
- Education: Moscow Institute of International Relations, Peking University
- Known for: Contributions to the study of kinship terminology and Chinese ethnic history
- Scientific career
- Fields: evolution of kinship terminology, long-term dynamics of the Chinese ethnos
- Workplaces: Russian Academy of Sciences

Mikhail Vasilyevich Kryukov (Russian: Михаил Васильевич Крюков; 12 July 1932 – 19 June 2024) was a Russian anthropologist and historian.

== Biography ==
Born in Moscow, Kryukov attended Moscow Institute of Oriental Studies, where he received a B.A. in 1954. He earned an M.A. in 1955 from Moscow Institute of International Relations, and from the Peking University in 1962. He earned a Ph.D. degree in 1965 from the USSR Academy of Sciences. Beginning in 1965, he was Senior Research Fellow of the Institute of Ethnology and Anthropology of the Russian Academy of Sciences.

Kryukov’s major contributions to cultural anthropology belong to two fields: (1) studies of the evolution of kinship terminology and (2) the study of long-term dynamics of the Chinese ethnos. Kryukov undertook the study of the dynamics of kinship terminology among Eurasian ethnic groups having deep historical traditions of written records. However, though he seems to consider his results as having universal applicability, they appear to be most applicable to the evolution of kinship terminology in Eurasia and among the Austronesians. He had shown that among those peoples bifurcate merging systems tended to get transformed either into bifurcate collateral, or generational ones. On the other hand, the lineal kinship terminology developed either from bifurcate collateral ones (this development is most typical for Eurasia), or from generational systems. Note that these are not mere speculations, as Kryukov supported his conclusions with a wealth of diachronic data. Being a sinologist he paid special attention to the evolution of kinship terminology among the Chinese, thoroughly documenting the transition from the bifurcate merging to bifurcate collateral kinship terminology among them in the first millennium BC and its further development up to the present.

Kryukov wrote over 15 books and 250 articles dealing with his research interests. These include (1968) Historical Interpretation of Kinship Terminology. Moscow: Institute of Ethnography, USSR Academy of Sciences, (1972) Chinese Kinship System. Moscow: Nauka (in Russian), and (1978–1993) a series of monographs (6 vols.) on historical dynamics of the Chinese ethnos from the 2nd millennium BC to the 20th century (Moscow: Nauka; in Russian).

Kryukov died on 19 June 2024, at the age of 91.
