= Javad =

Javad (جواد) is a masculine given name of Persian origin. It is a variant of the Arabic name Jawad, which means generous. Notable people with the name include:

== Given name ==
- Javad Aghaeipour (born 1999), Iranian footballer
- Javad Aghayev (born 2002), Azerbaijani taekwondo practitioner
- Javad Gharavi Aliari (1935–2018), Iranian Twelver Shi'a Marja
- Javad Alizadeh (born 1953), Iranian cartoonist
- Javad Allahverdi (born 1952), Iranian footballer
- Javad Ameri (1891–1980), Iranian politician
- Javad Arianmanesh (born 1953), Iranian footballer
- Javad Ashtiani (born 1981), Iranian footballer
- Javad Bushehri (1893–1972), Iranian businessman and politician
- Javad Daraei (born 1992), Iranian filmmaker
- Javad Davari (born 1983), Iranian basketball player
- Javad Sa'd al-Dowleh (1856–1930), Iranian politician
- Javad Etaat (born 1963), Iranian politician
- Javad Ezzati (born 1982), Iranian actor
- Javad Fakoori (1938–1981), Iranian military colonel
- Javad Foroughi (born 1979), Iranian sport shooter
- Javad Ghenaat (born 1966), Iranian politician
- Javad Ghorab (born 1949), Iranian footballer
- Javad Hakimli (1914–2006), Azerbaijani guerrilla fighter
- Javad Hamidi (1918–2002), Iranian painter, poet, and educator
- Javad Hardani (born 1984), Iranian Paralympic athlete
- Javad Hashemi (born 1966), Iranian actor, film director, writer, and composer
- Javad Heyat (1925–2014), Iranian surgeon and writer
- Javad Jahangirzadeh (born 1966), Iranian politician
- Javad Jalali (born 1977), Iranian photographer
- Javad Karimi (born 1998), Iranian volleyball player
- Javad Karimi-Ghodousi (born 1956), Iranian politician and military commander
- Javad Kazemian (born 1981), Iranian footballer
- Javad Khamenei (1895–1986), Iranian Shia cleric
- Javad Khan (1748–1804), Iranian military commander
- Javad Khiabani (born 1966), Iranian journalist, football commentator, and television show host
- Javad Hajizadeh Koljahi (born 1958), Iranian cleric
- Javad Maheri (born 1983), Iranian footballer
- Javad Mahjoub (born 1991), Iranian mixed martial artist
- Javad bey Malik-Yeganov (1878–1942), Azerbaijani politician
- Javad Manafi (born 1970), Iranian football player and coach
- Javad Marandi (born 1968), Iranian-British businessman and property developer
- Javad Maroufi (1912–1993), Iranian composer and pianist
- Javad Mashreghi (born 1968), Iranian mathematician and author
- Javad Mirjavadov (1923–1992), Azerbaijani painter
- Javad Asghari Moghaddam (born 1979), Iranian futsal coach and player
- Javad Mohammadinejad (born 1985), Iranian volleyball player
- Javad Mojabi (1939–2026), Iranian poet, writer, researcher, and critic
- Javad Mokhbery (born 1952), American businessman and philanthropist
- Javad Molania (born 1978), Iranian actor, director, presenter, photographer, and painter
- Javad Nekounam (born 1980), Iranian football player and manager
- Javad Nurbakhsh (1926–2008), Iranian Sufi mystic
- Javad Owji (born 1966), Iranian oil engineer and politician
- Javad Parvizi (born 1965), American orthopedic surgeon
- Javad Razavian (born 1974), Iranian actor
- Javad Razzaghi (born 1982), Iranian footballer
- Javad Karimi Sabet (born 1973), Iranian academic, researcher, and nuclear scientist
- Javad Sadatinejad (born 1972), Iranian politician
- Javad Sadr (1912–1990), Iranian diplomat and politician
- Javad Saeed (1923/24–1979), Iranian politician
- Javad Mojtahed Shabestari (born 1966), Iranian Shiite cleric and politician
- Javad Shahrestani (1924–2016), Iranian engineer, academic, and politician
- Javad Shamaqdari (born 1960), Iranian filmmaker
- Javad bey Shikhlinski (1874–1959), Azerbaijani Army officer
- Javad khan Shirvanski (1812/13–??), Azerbaijani Army general and noble
- Javad Shirzad (born 1982), Iranian footballer
- Javad Tabatabai (1945–2023), Iranian philosopher and political scientist
- Javad Yasari (born 1944), Iranian singer and musician
- Javad Zarincheh (born 1966), Iranian football player and coach

== See also ==
- Javad (disambiguation)
