= Jawad (name) =

- Pronunciation: Arabic: [dʒaˈwaːd] Persian: [dʒævɒːd] Hindi: [dʒəʋaːd]
- Gender: Male
- Language: Arabic, Berber Persian, Urdu, Dari, Pashto, Azeri, Serbo-Croatian, Albanian

Origin
- Meaning: Steed, Open-handed/Generous
- Region of origin: Arabia

Other names
- Variant forms: Cevat (Turkish), Dževad (Bosnian)

Jawad (Arabic & Persian: جواد), Bosnian: Dževad; Russian: Жавад, romanized: Dzhavad; Azerbaijani: Cavad, Berber languages: ⵊⴰⵡⴷ, romanized: Jawed; Turkish: Cevat; Albanian: Xhevat) is an Arabic given name that means generous, liberal, magnanimous, and open-handed. The name is common in the Balkans, Caucasus, Middle East, Morocco and South Asia.

== First name ==
- Jaouad Achab (born 1992), Belgian taekwondo practitioner of Moroccan origin
- Jawad Ahmad (born 1970), Pakistani singer and politician
- Jaouad Akaddar (1984–2012), Moroccan footballer
- Jawad Akeel (born 1978), Dutch-Qatari footballer
- Jawad Ali (1907–1987), Iraqi historian
- Javad Alizadeh (born 1953), Iranian cartoonist
- Javad Allahverdi (born 1954), Iranian footballer
- Jawad Anani (born 1943), Jordanian economist and politician
- Jawad El Andaloussi (born 1955), Moroccan footballer
- Jawad Al Arrayed (born 1940), Bahraini politician
- Jawad al-Assadi (born 1947), Iraqi theatre director and playwright
- Jawad Bashir (born 1970), Pakistani director, actor and singer
- Jawad Blunt (born 1995), Pakistani freestyle football champion
- Jawad Botmeh, Palestinian student convicted of the 1994 attack in the London Israeli embassy
- Jawad al-Bulani (born 1960), Iraqi politician and minister
- Jaouad Chiguer (born 1985), French amateur boxer
- Cevat Cobanli (1870–1938), Turkish commander and politician
- Jawad Rumi Daini (born 1948), Iraqi Army general
- Javad Davari (born 1983), Iranian basketball player
- Jawad Dawood (born 1982), Pakistani-Canadian cricketer
- Javad Fakoori (1938–1981), Iranian Air Force officer
- Javad Gharavi Aliari (1935–2018), Iranian Grand Ayatollah
- Jaouad Gharib (born 1972), Moroccan runner
- Jawad Ghaziyar, Afghan singer
- Cevat Güler (born 1959), Turkish footballer and coach
- Cevat Abbas Gurer (1887–1943), Turkish officer and politician
- Jawad El Hajri (born 1979), French footballer
- Javad Hakimli (1914–2016), Soviet Azerbaijani Partisan during WWII
- Jawad Hameed (born 1976), Pakistani cricketer
- Javad Hamidi (1918–2002), Iranian painter and poet
- Javad Hashemi (born 1966), Iranian actor and director
- Javad Heyat (1925–2014), Iranian Azerbaijani surgeon and Writer
- Jawad Hussain (1939–2008), Indian cricketer
- Cevat Şakir Kabaağaçlı (1886–1973), Turkish writer
- Jawad Kadhim (born 1993), Iraqi footballer
- Dževad Karahasan (1953–2023), Bosnian writer and philosopher
- Javad Kazemian (born 1981), Iranian footballer
- Xhevat Kelmendi (born 1955), Kosovar singer
- Javad Khan (1748–1804), member of the royal Qajar family
- Cevat Kula (1902–1977), Turkish equestrian
- Javad Malik-Yeganov (1878–1942), Azerbaijani politician and Governor-General of Lankaran
- Javad Maroufi (1912–1993), Iranian composer and pianist
- Javad Mojabi (born 1939), Iranian poet and literary critic
- Javad Nekounam (born 1980), Iranian footballer
- Javad Nurbakhsh (1926–2008), Iranian Sufi leader and psychiatrist
- Jawad Ouaddouch (born 1981), Moroccan footballer
- Dževad Prekazi (born 1957), Yugoslav Kosovar footballer
- Dževad Poturak (born 1977), Bosnian super heavyweight kickboxer
- Javad Razavian (born 1974), Iranian actor
- Javad Razzaghi (born 1982), Iranian footballer
- Jawad Jabbar Sadkhan Al-Sahlani, Iraqi man held at Guantanamo
- Jawad Saleem (1919–1961), Iraqi painter and sculptor
- Jawad Salehi (born 1956), Iranian electrical and computer engineer
- Dževad Šećerbegović (born 1955), Yugoslav Bosnian footballer
- Cevat Seyit (1906–1945), Turkish footballer
- Javad Shamaqdari (born 1960), Iranian filmmaker and politician
- Javad Khan Shiravanski (1809–1882), Major General of the Russian Imperial Army and Azerbaijani Noble
- Javad Shirzad (born 1982), Iranian footballer
- Javad Tabatabai (1945–2023), Iranian political philosopher and historian
- Jawad Tabrizi (1926–2006), Iranian Ayatollah
- Dževad Turković (born 1972), Yugoslav and Croatian footballer
- Jawad Williams (born 1983), American basketball player
- Javad Yasari (born 1947), Persian singer
- Cevat Yerli (born 1978), Turkish and German computer game developer
- Jaouad Zairi (born 1982), Moroccan footballer
- Javad Zarincheh (born 1966), Iranian football player and coach

== Middle name ==
- Mohammad-Javad Bahonar (1933–1981), Iranian theologian and politician
- Mohammad Jawad Balaghi (1865–1933), Iraqi Shia Muslim religious authority
- Migjen Xhevat Basha (born 1987), Kosovar Albanian footballer
- Mohamad Jawad Chirri (1905–1994), Lebanese founder of the Islamic Center of America
- Mufid Mohammad Jawad al-Jazairi (born 1939), Iraqi journalist and politician
- Mohamad Jawad Khalifeh (born 1961), Lebanese politician and minister of health
- Mohammad-Javad Larijani (born 1951), Iranian politician, hard-line cleric and mathematician
- Zayn Javadd Malik (born 1993), Pakistani-English singer and songwriter
- Syed Jawad Naqvi (born 1952), Pakistani Twelver Shia Muslim cleric
- Hossam Jawad Al-Sabah (1948–2021), Lebanese actor
- Ali Jawad al-Sheikh (1997–2011), Bahraini boy killed in the Bahraini Uprising
- Ali Jawad Al Taher (c. 1911–1996), Iraqi literary scholar and critic
- Ridha Jawad Taqi, Iraqi politician and Member of Parliament
- Leman Cevat Tomsu (1913–1988), Turkish architect and academic
- Mohammad Javad Tondguyan (1950–1991), Iranian engineer and politician
- Abu Mohammad Jawad Walieddine (1916–2012), Lebanese regional Druze spiritual leader
- Ali Jawad Zaidi (1916–2004), Indian Urdu poet and scholar
- Mohammad Javad Zarif (born 1960), Iranian diplomat, academic, and foreign minister

== Last name ==
- Abdul Sattar Jawad (born 1943), Iraqi-American scholar of Arabic and English literature
- Ahmad Javad (1892–1937), Azerbaijani poet
- Ali Jawad (born 1989), British paralympic powerlifter
- Daniane Jawad (born 1986), Moroccan footballer
- Hussain Jawad (born 1987), Bahraini human rights activist
- Kalbe Jawad (born 1966), Indian Muslim cleric and scholar
- Kashif Jawad (born 1981), Pakistani field hockey player
- Mazen Abdul-Jawad (born 1977), Saudi Arabian man arrested for talking publicly about sex
- Mohamed Abd Al-Jawad (born 1962), Saudi Arabian footballer
- Mohammed Abdel-Jawad (born 1979), Palestinian footballer
- Mohamed Jawad (born 1985), Pakistani youth accused and held for attempted murder at Guantanamo
- Muhammad al-Jawad, (811–835), ninth of the Twelve Imams
- Said Tayeb Jawad (born 1958), Afghan diplomat
- Saleh Abd al-Jawad (born 1952), Palestinian historian
- Shamim Jawad, Afghan activist
- Shireen Jawad (born 1971), Bangladeshi-English singer
- Suleika Jaouad (born 1988), an American writer and motivational speaker

== See also ==
- Jawad (disambiguation), for non-name uses
