= Iraqis in Iran =

Iranian Iraqis
- Iraq Iran

Total population
- 500,000 - 1 million+

Regions with significant populations
- Iranian Kurdistan, Abadan, Ahvaz, Ilam, Tehran, Mashhad, Qom, Nishapur

Languages
- Mesopotamian Arabic, Kurdish, Persian

Religion
- Predominantly: Shia Islam; Minority: Yazdânism

Related ethnic groups
- Arabs, Armenians, Assyrians, Azeris, Georgians, Kurds, Lurs, Persians, Turks, Arab-Persians

There is a large population of Iraqis in Iran, including Iranian citizens of Iraqi descent and Iraqi citizens of Iranian descent. According to the 2001 Iran census, there were roughly 203,000 Iraqis living in Iran; a report from the United Nations High Commissioner for Refugees counts 204,000 Iraqis living in Iran. The actual figure is likely to be much higher than this, perhaps exceeding 500,000, as many Iraqis gained Iranian citizenship while in Iran. In recent years, many have returned to Iraq following the fall of the Saddam Hussein regime.

== Migration history ==
Iraqis have always been in Iran, with well-established populations in Ahvaz, Abadan and Ilam, but many have fled and settled in other countries because of events such as the 1979 Islamic Iranian revolution and the Iran–Iraq War.

The UN Office for the Coordination of Humanitarian Affairs recorded over 202,000 Iraqi refugees in Iran in September 2003, over half the entire Iraqi refugee population in the world. About 50,000 of them are housed in 22 refugee camps in Iran, which are situated along the country's western border with Iraq, this number is significantly higher than that for Afghan refugees, of whom only about 2 percent live in camps. The majority of Iraqi refugees live in urban areas in western Iran. In total, more than 11,500 Iraqis have returned in convoys facilitated by UNHCR from Iran, Saudi Arabia and Lebanon since the end of the war that led to the downfall of Saddam Hussein.

With more than 200,000 Iraqi refugees living in Iran, they are more than half of all registered Iraqi refugees in the world. At around 48,000 of the refugees are hosted in Iran's camps, but most Iraqi refugees live in large urban centres, usually in the western parts of Iran. The majority of Iraqis have opted for life in Tehran, due to its high standards of living and greater job availability. Predominantly settling down in Dowlatabad-e Qeysariyeh, an almost entirely Iraqi neighbourhood in the south-eastern corner of Tehran. Another well-known Iraqi neighbourhood in Iran is Marvi Alley, a shopping area located in the centre of Tehran. This is where the first Iraqi refugees came in the early '70s, and has remained a centre for all Iraqis in Tehran, often dubbed it Baghdad Market.

During the Ba'ath era, many Iraqis who had ties to Iran were accused of being Iranian spies and deported by the government; this includes the population of Feyli Kurds, who live on the Iran–Iraq border, and frequently cross it. After the death of Saddam Hussein in 2006, many Feyli Kurds were given the option to apply to have their Iraqi citizenship re-instated, and invited back to the country.

== Culture ==
Iran's connection with Iraq dates back to antiquity. The Parthian Iranians and Sasanian Persians placed their capital at Ctesiphon, 30 kilometres (20 mi) from present-day Baghdad. It is believed to have been the largest city in the world from 570 to 637 A.D. The Iranian Ambassador to Iraq recently announced that Iran is committed to working with Iraqi national and provincials governments on a restoration of Taq Kasra in Ctesiphon.

== Notable people ==
- Jawad Salehi, university professor
- Mohammad Reza Naqdi, military commander
- Muhammad Ali Mazidi, academic, engineer, author
- Nouri Khodayari, footballer
- Duraid Munajim, filmmaker
- Osamah Sami, actor

== See also ==
- Iraqi Moaveds
- Iranians in Iraq
- Iran-Iraq relations
