= Demographics of Iran =

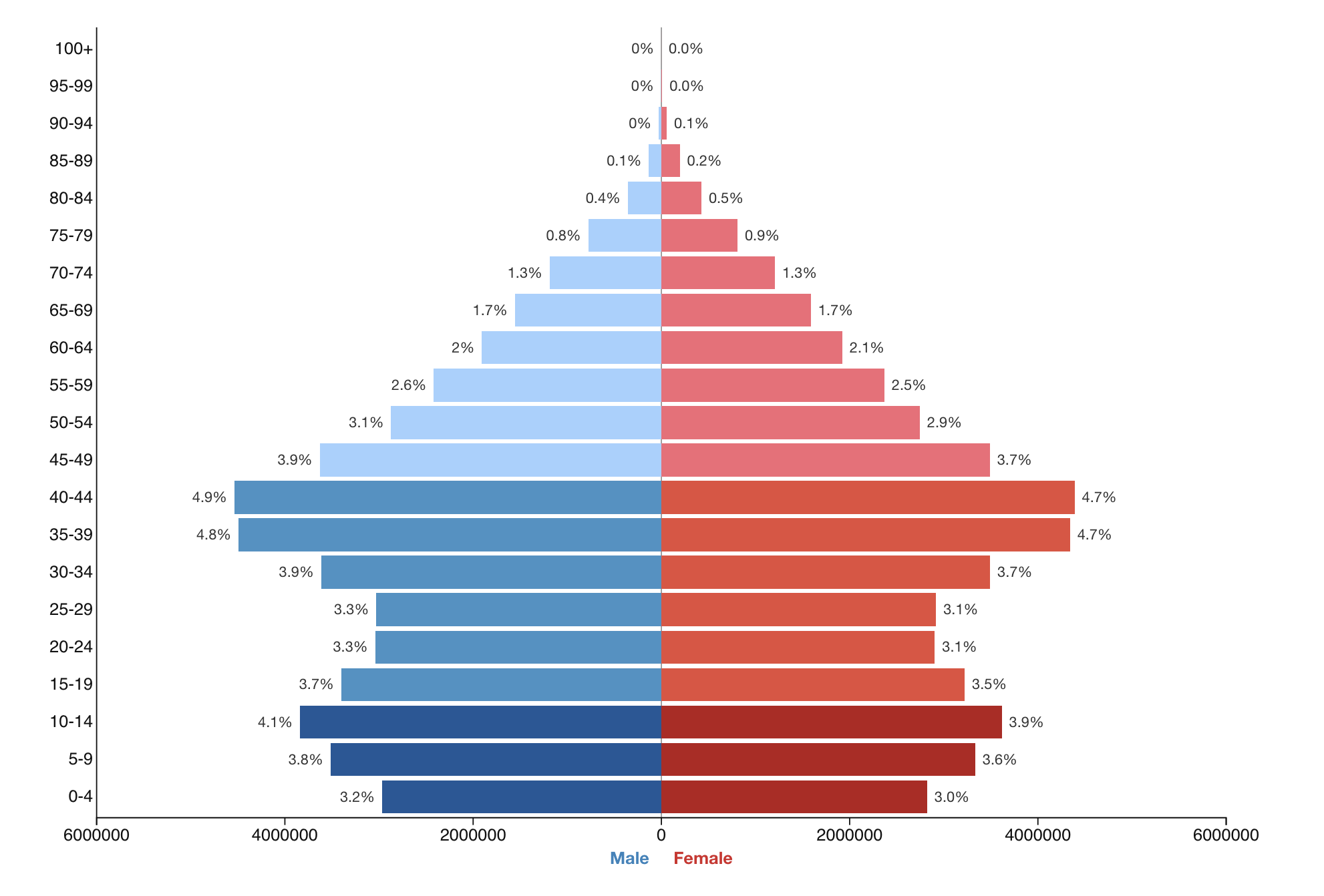
- Population pyramid of Iran in 2026
- Population: 87,021,053 (2026 est.)
- Density: 56/km^{2} (150/sq mi) (2024 est.)
- Growth rate: 0.43% (2026 est.)
- Birth rate: 10.3 births/1,000 population (2025 est.)
- Death rate: 5.2 deaths/1,000 population (2025 est.)
- Life expectancy: 75.6 years (2024 est.)
  - male: 74.3 years
  - female: 77.1 years
- Fertility rate: 1.35 children born/woman (2025 est.)
- Infant mortality: 14.3 deaths/1,000 live births (2024 est.)
- Net migration rate: −0.3 migrant(s)/1,000 population (2024 est.)
- Immigrant share: 4.2% (2024)

Age structure
- 0–14 years: 23.3% (male 10,512,797/female 10,040,282)
- 15–64 years: 69.8% (male 31,413,125/female 30,267,241)
- 65 and over: 7% (male 2,869,617/female 3,283,875) (2024 est.)

Sex ratio
- Total: 1.03 male(s)/female (2024 est.)
- At birth: 1.05 male(s)/female
- Under 15: 1.05 male(s)/female
- 15–64 years: 1.04 male(s)/female
- 65 and over: 0.87 male(s)/female

Nationality
- Nationality: Iranian
- Major ethnic: Persians
- Minor ethnic: Azeris; Kurds; Lurs; Baloch; Gilaks; Mazanderanis; Qashqai; Arabs; Turkmens; Talyshis

Language
- Official: Persian (61%)
- Spoken: Azerbaijani (14.3%); Kurdish (9.1%); Gilaki (3.8%); Mazanderani (3.6%); Arabic (2.0%); Balochi (2.0%); Bakhtiari (1.3%); Turkmen (1.2%); Armenian (0.2%); Others (1.5%)

Iranians
ایرانیان
- Flag of Iran

Total population
- c. 96 million

Regions with significant populations
- Iran 86,563,000 (2025 est.)
- United States: 568,564
- United Kingdom: 400,000
- Germany: 336,000
- Canada: 280,805
- UAE: 357,000
- Sweden: 116,770
- France: 90,000
- Australia: 70,899

Languages
- Majority: Persian; Minority: Azerbaijani, Kurdish, Gilaki, Mazanderani, Arabic, Balochi, and other languages of Iran

Religion
- Shia Islam (majority); Sunni Islam (minority)

Related ethnic groups
- Other Iranian peoples

The population of Iranian provinces and counties in 2021.

Iran's population increased dramatically in the late 20th century, reaching about 80 million by 2016. As of 2026, Iran's population is over 87 million. In recent years, however, Iran's birth rate has dropped significantly. Studies project that Iran's rate of population growth will continue to slow until it stabilises above 100 million by 2050. Half of Iran's population was under 35 years old in 2012. In January 2025, the average age of the Iranian population was 32 years.

In 2009, the number of households stood at 15.3 million, at 4.8 persons per household. In 2012, the average family income was 11.8 million rials (about $960) per month.

Between 1990 to 2008 Iran's population grew by 17.6 million, an increase of 32%. The literacy rate was 80% in 2002, and 85% in 2016. The 2021 fertility rate was 1.6, below the natural replacement rate of 2.1.

In 2026, Iran recorded its lowest birth rate in nearly 70 years.

== Population ==
Iran's population history

In the 2016 census Iran's population was 79.9 million, a fourfold increase since 1956. Between 1976 and 1986, an average annual population growth of almost 4% was reached. Due to decreasing fertility levels, growth decreased to 1.2% between 2011 and 2016.

Population census results
Census date	Population	Average annual growth (%)	Population density/km^{2}	Proportion urban (%)	Household size
1956-11-01	18,954,704	—	12	31.4	
1966-11-01	25,785,210	3.13	16	37.5	
1976-11-01	33,708,744	2.71	20	47.0	5.02
1986-11-22	49,445,010	3.91	30	54.0	5.11
1996-11-01	60,055,488	2.0	37	61.0	4.84
2006-11-01	70,495,782	1.62	43	68.5	4.03
2011-11-01	75,149,669	1.29	46	71.4	3.55
2016-11-01	79,926,270	1.24	49	74.0	3.3

Age group	Number (2006)	Percentage (2006)	Number (2011)	Percentage (2011)
Total	70,495,782	100	75,149,669	100
0–4	5,463,978	7.75	6,232,552	8.29
5–9	5,509,057	7.81	5,657,791	7.53
10–14	6,708,591	9.52	5,671,435	7.55
15–19	8,726,761	12.38	6,607,043	8.79
20–24	9,011,422	12.78	8,414,497	11.20
25–29	7,224,952	10.25	8,672,654	11.54
30–34	5,553,531	7.88	6,971,924	9.28
35–39	4,921,124	6.98	5,571,018	7.41
40–44	4,089,158	5.80	4,906,749	6.53
45–49	3,522,761	5.00	4,030,481	5.36
50–54	2,755,420	3.91	3,527,408	4.69
55–59	1,887,981	2.68	2,680,119	3.57
60–64	1,464,452	2.08	1,862,907	2.48
65–69	1,197,550	1.70	1,343,731	1.79
70–74	1,119,318	1.59	1,119,968	1.49
75–79	694,122	0.98	913,531	1.22
80+	645,601	0.92	919,539	1.22
Unclear	–	–	46,322	0.06

Number of children 0–14	Number of people 15–49	Proportion	Number of women 15–49	Proportion
17,681,629 (2006)	43,049,709 (2006)	0.4107 (2006)	~21,524,855 (2006)	0.8215 (2006)
17,561,778 (2011)	45,174,366 (2011)	0.3888 (2011)	~22,587,183 (2011)	0.7775 (2011)

Population Estimates by Sex and Age Group (01.VII.2020) Data refers to the Iranian Year which begins on 21 March and ends on 20 March of the following year.

Age group	Male	Female	Total	%
Total	42,484,186	41,553,414	84,037,600	100
0–4	3,751,160	3,584,640	7,335,800	8.73
5–9	3,644,823	3,453,109	7,097,932	8.45
10–14	3,195,837	3,043,160	6,238,997	7.42
15–19	2,850,201	2,723,069	5,573,270	6.63
20–24	2,817,236	2,715,743	5,532,979	6.58
25–29	3,398,106	3,322,934	6,721,040	8.00
30–34	4,246,233	4,166,179	8,412,412	10.01
35–39	4,226,366	4,147,771	8,374,137	9.96
40–44	3,375,662	3,271,031	6,646,693	7.91
45–49	2,687,892	2,591,386	5,279,278	6.28
50–54	2,321,552	2,270,429	4,591,981	5.46
55–59	1,841,337	1,847,872	3,689,209	4.39
60–64	1,510,299	1,557,919	3,068,218	3.65
65–69	1,058,091	1,138,129	2,196,220	2.61
70–74	640 098	748 890	1,388,988	1.65
75–79	415 623	459 393	875 016	1.04
80+	503 670	511 760	1,015,430	1.21
Age group	Male	Female	Total	Percent
0–14	10,591,820	10,080,909	20,672,729	24.60
15–64	29,274,884	28,614,333	57,889,217	68.88
65+	2,617,482	2,858,172	5,475,654	6.52

Year	0–14	15–64	65+
1976	44.5	52	3.5
1985	45.5	51.5	3
1996	39.5	56.1	4.3
2006	25.1 (17,681,629)	69.7 (49,157,562)	5.2 (3,656,591)
2011	23.4 (17,561,778)	70.9 (53,297,122)	5.7 (4,290,769)
2016	24.0 (19,192,665)	69.9 (55,862,087)	6.1 (4,871,518)

Table 9 – Population and Average Annual Growth by Provinces: 2006 and 2011

Province	2006	2011	Average annual growth
Alborz	2,076,991	2,412,513	3.04
Ardabil	1,228,155	1,248,488	0.33
Bushehr	886,267	1,032,949	3.11
Chaharmahal and Bakhtiari	857,910	895,263	0.86
East Azerbaijan	3,603,456	3,724,620	0.66
Fars	4,336,878	4,596,658	1.17
Gilan	2,404,861	2,480,874	0.62
Golestan	1,617,087	1,777,014	1.90
Hamadan	1,703,267	1,758,268	0.64
Hormozgan	1,403,674	1,578,183	2.37
Ilam	545,787	557,599	0.43
Isfahan	4,559,256	4,879,312	1.37
Kerman	2,652,413	2,938,988	2.07
Kermanshah	1,879,385	1,945,227	0.69
Khuzestan	4,274,979	4,531,720	1.17
Kohgiluyeh and Boyer-Ahmad	634,299	658,629	0.76
Kurdistan	1,440,156	1,493,645	0.73
Lorestan	1,716,527	1,754,243	0.44
Markazi	1,351,257	1,413,959	0.91
Mazandaran	2,922,432	3,073,943	1.02
North Khorasan	811,572	867,727	1.35
Qazvin	1,143,200	1,201,565	1.00
Qom	1,046,737	1,151,672	1.93
Razavi Khorasan	5,593,079	5,994,402	1.40
Semnan	589,742	631,218	1.37
Sistan and Baluchestan	2,405,742	2,534,327	1.05
South Khorasan	636,420	662,534	0.81
Tehran	11,345,375	12,183,391	1.44
West Azerbaijan	2,873,459	3,080,576	1.40
Yazd	990,818	1,074,428	1.63
Zanjan	964,601	1,015,734	1.04
Total	70,495,782	75,149,669	1.29

1 The population of the provinces of Alborz and Tehran for 2006 and their average annual growth have been calculated based on the data of 2011.

Unofficial Translation 17

Table 10 – Population Percentages by Province: 2006 and 2011 (Percentage)

Iran's provinces by 2013 population density

Province	2006	2011
Alborz	2.95	3.21
Ardabil	1.74	1.66
Bushehr	1.26	1.37
Chaharmahal and Bakhtiari	1.22	1.19
East Azerbaijan	5.11	4.96
Fars	6.15	6.12
Gilan	3.41	3.30
Golestan	2.29	2.36
Hamadan	2.42	2.34
Hormozgan	1.99	2.10
Ilam	0.77	0.74
Isfahan	6.47	6.49
Kerman	3.76	3.91
Kermanshah	2.67	2.59
Khuzestan	6.06	6.03
Kohgiluyeh and Boyer-Ahmad	0.90	0.88
Kurdistan	2.04	1.99
Lorestan	2.43	2.33
Markazi	1.92	1.88
Mazandaran	4.15	4.09
North Khorasan	1.15	1.15
Qazvin	1.62	1.60
Qom	1.48	1.53
Razavi Khorasan	7.93	7.98
Semnan	0.84	0.84
Sistan and Baluchestan	3.41	3.37
South Khorasan	0.90	0.88
Tehran	16.09	16.21
West Azerbaijan	4.08	4.10
Yazd	1.41	1.43
Zanjan	1.37	1.35
Total	100	100

1 The population of the provinces of Alborz and Tehran for 2006 and their average annual growth have been calculated based on the data of 2011.

=== Urban population ===
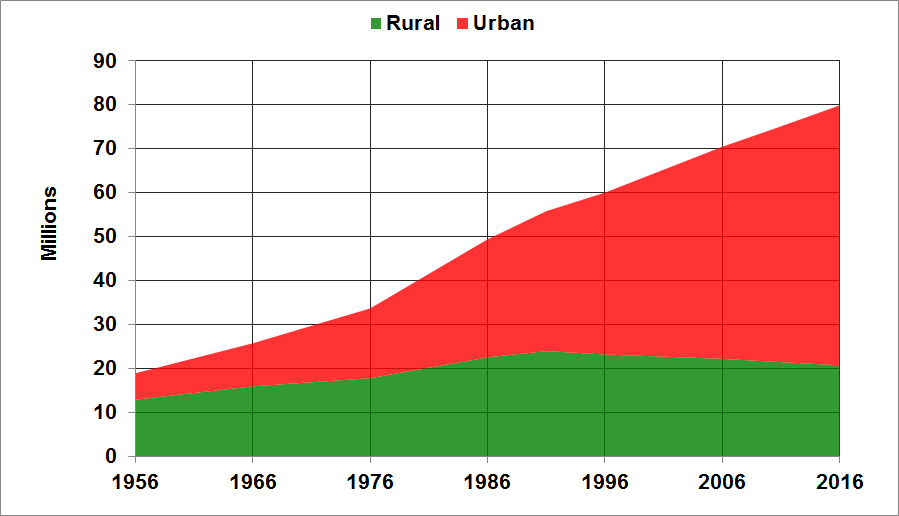
Iran's urban and rural populations

Iran has one of the steepest urban growth rates in the world. In 2015, approximately 73.4% of Iran's population lived in urban areas, up from 27% in 1950.

The following is a list of the 8 most populous cities in Iran:

Rank	City	Province	population	
Rank	City	Province	City	Metro
1	Tehran	Tehran	8,693,706	14,700,000
2	Mashhad	Razavi Khorasan	3,001,184	3,100,000
3	Isfahan	Isfahan	1,961,260	3,100,000
4	Karaj	Alborz	1,592,492	2,500,000
5	Shiraz	Fars	1,565,572	1,700,000
6	Tabriz	East Azarbaijan	1,588,693	1,760,000
7	Qom	Qom	1,201,158	1,240,000
8	Ahvaz	Khuzestan	1,184,788	1,320,000

== Vital statistics ==
=== UN estimates ===
2022 estimates.

	Population (on 1 July)	Live births per year	Deaths per year	Natural change per year	Crude birth rate^{1}	Crude death rate^{1}	Natural change^{1}	Crude migration rate^{1}	Total fertility rate^{2}	Infant mortality rate^{3}
1950	16,833,000	844,000	469,000	375,000	50.1	27.9	22.3		6.95	209.0
1951	17,220,000	863,000	481,000	382,000	50.1	27.9	22.2	0.3	6.95	207.3
1952	17,614,000	883,000	485,000	398,000	50.1	27.5	22.6	-0.2	6.96	203.7
1953	18,018,000	904,000	490,000	414,000	50.1	27.2	23.0	-0.6	6.98	200.5
1954	18,435,000	925,000	490,000	434,000	50.1	26.6	23.6	-1.0	7.01	197.2
1955	18,874,000	946,000	491,000	455,000	50.1	26.0	24.1	-0.8	7.04	192.9
1956	19,332,000	968,000	494,000	474,000	50.0	25.5	24.5	-0.8	7.08	189.5
1957	19,806,000	996,000	497,000	499,000	50.2	25.1	25.2	-1.3	7.18	185.8
1958	20,295,000	1,022,000	494,000	528,000	50.3	24.3	26.0	-1.9	7.28	181.6
1959	20,822,000	1,046,000	494,000	551,000	50.2	23.7	26.5	-1.2	7.38	177.8
1960	21,389,000	1,049,000	493,000	556,000	49.0	23.1	26.0	0.5	7.30	174.0
1961	21,984,000	1,053,000	489,000	564,000	48.0	22.3	25.7	1.4	7.23	170.2
1962	22,605,000	1,069,000	500,000	569,000	47.4	22.2	25.2	2.3	7.22	167.3
1963	23,259,000	1,082,000	485,000	597,000	46.6	20.9	25.7	2.4	7.18	162.8
1964	23,949,000	1,098,000	483,000	615,000	45.9	20.2	25.7	3.1	7.13	159.1
1965	24,667,000	1,120,000	482,000	637,000	45.5	19.6	25.9	3.2	7.11	155.4
1966	25,399,000	1,145,000	480,000	664,000	45.1	18.9	26.2	2.6	7.08	151.6
1967	26,133,000	1,174,000	480,000	694,000	44.9	18.4	26.6	1.5	7.05	147.6
1968	26,875,000	1,195,000	487,000	708,000	44.5	18.1	26.4	1.2	6.97	144.0
1969	27,644,000	1,220,000	474,000	746,000	44.2	17.2	27.0	0.8	6.90	138.9
1970	28,450,000	1,229,000	468,000	761,000	43.2	16.5	26.8	1.5	6.71	134.1
1971	29,274,000	1,239,000	459,000	780,000	42.4	15.7	26.7	1.4	6.51	128.9
1972	30,112,000	1,237,000	456,000	782,000	41.1	15.1	26.0	1.8	6.25	123.8
1973	30,982,000	1,258,000	440,000	818,000	40.6	14.2	26.4	1.7	6.11	118.2
1974	31,896,000	1,295,000	433,000	862,000	40.6	13.6	27.0	1.7	6.04	113.0
1975	32,857,000	1,339,000	428,000	911,000	40.8	13.0	27.8	1.4	6.01	107.7
1976	33,841,000	1,416,000	425,000	991,000	41.8	12.5	29.3	-0.2	6.14	102.3
1977	34,876,000	1,474,000	421,000	1,053,000	42.3	12.1	30.2	-0.5	6.20	96.6
1978	35,994,000	1,550,000	446,000	1,104,000	43.1	12.4	30.7	0.4	6.33	92.4
1979	37,205,000	1,645,000	411,000	1,234,000	44.2	11.0	33.2	-0.7	6.53	85.1
1980	38,521,000	1,708,000	422,000	1,286,000	44.4	11.0	33.4	0.8	6.58	79.5
1981	40,476,000	1,756,000	463,000	1,293,000	44.1	11.6	32.4	15.9	6.56	74.3
1982	42,500,000	1,886,000	467,000	1,419,000	44.4	11.0	33.4	14.2	6.55	69.3
1983	44,028,000	1,930,000	458,000	1,472,000	43.9	10.4	33.5	1.2	6.51	65.1
1984	45,628,000	1,966,000	420,000	1,546,000	43.1	9.2	33.9	1.2	6.44	61.5
1985	47,266,000	1,974,000	415,000	1,559,000	41.8	8.8	33.0	1.7	6.26	58.2
1986	48,913,000	1,957,000	409,000	1,547,000	40.0	8.4	31.7	2.0	6.01	55.3
1987	50,541,000	1,915,000	407,000	1,507,000	37.9	8.1	29.9	2.3	5.69	52.6
1988	52,112,000	1,872,000	399,000	1,473,000	36.0	7.7	28.3	1.8	5.39	49.8
1989	53,645,000	1,828,000	358,000	1,470,000	34.1	6.7	27.4	1.2	5.11	47.4
1990	55,794,000	1,788,000	395,000	1,393,000	32.5	7.2	25.3	13.2	4.86	46.5
1991	57,991,000	1,790,000	359,000	1,431,000	30.9	6.2	24.7	13.2	4.51	43.1
1992	59,372,000	1,697,000	358,000	1,340,000	28.5	6.0	22.5	0.8	4.08	41.3
1993	59,755,000	1,579,000	352,000	1,227,000	26.1	5.8	20.3	-13.9	3.68	39.8
1994	59,986,000	1,367,000	340,000	1,027,000	22.8	5.7	17.1	-13.2	3.27	38.2
1995	60,795,000	1,244,000	335,000	908,000	20.4	5.5	14.9	-1.6	2.89	36.8
1996	61,598,000	1,145,000	333,000	811,000	18.6	5.4	13.2	-0.2	2.57	35.4
1997	62,481,000	1,081,000	334,000	747,000	17.3	5.4	12.0	2.1	2.33	34.0
1998	63,461,000	1,064,000	336,000	727,000	16.8	5.3	11.5	3.9	2.20	32.5
1999	64,475,000	1,065,000	333,000	732,000	16.6	5.2	11.4	4.3	2.10	31.0
2000	65,544,000	1,071,000	337,000	735,000	16.4	5.2	11.2	5.1	2.02	29.5
2001	66,675,000	1,082,000	344,000	738,000	16.3	5.2	11.1	5.9	1.94	28.1
2002	67,327,000	1,086,000	345,000	742,000	16.1	5.1	11.0	-1.3	1.87	26.4
2003	67,955,000	1,081,000	370,000	712,000	16.0	5.5	10.5	-1.3	1.82	25.6
2004	69,062,000	1,107,000	345,000	762,000	16.1	5.0	11.1	4.9	1.80	23.4
2005	70,183,000	1,134,000	348,000	786,000	16.2	5.0	11.2	4.8	1.78	21.9
2006	71,276,000	1,173,000	349,000	824,000	16.5	4.9	11.6	3.7	1.77	20.6
2007	72,319,000	1,221,000	350,000	872,000	16.9	4.8	12.1	2.3	1.77	19.4
2008	73,318,000	1,265,000	369,000	896,000	17.3	5.0	12.2	1.4	1.77	18.2
2009	74,323,000	1,304,000	381,000	923,000	17.5	5.1	12.4	1.1	1.77	17.2
2010	75,374,000	1,337,000	385,000	953,000	17.8	5.1	12.6	1.3	1.77	16.3
2011	76,343,000	1,388,000	381,000	1,008,000	18.2	5.0	13.2	-0.5	1.80	15.5
2012	77,324,000	1,464,000	378,000	1,085,000	18.9	4.9	14.0	-1.3	1.89	14.8
2013	78,459,000	1,526,000	385,000	1,141,000	19.4	4.9	14.5	0	1.96	14.2
2014	79,962,000	1,579,000	391,000	1,188,000	19.8	4.9	14.9	3.9	2.04	13.6
2015	81,791,000	1,583,000	395,000	1,188,000	19.4	4.8	14.6	7.8	2.05	13.1
2016	83,306,000	1,584,000	394,000	1,190,000	19.0	4.7	14.3	3.9	2.07	12.6
2017	84,505,000	1,572,000	396,000	1,176,000	18.6	4.7	13.9	0.3	2.07	12.2
2018	85,618,000	1,475,000	404,000	1,071,000	17.2	4.7	12.5	0.5	1.97	11.8
2019	86,564,000	1,308,000	421,000	886,000	15.1	4.9	10.2	-0.4	1.77	11.4
2020	87,290,000	1,243,000	486,000	757,000	14.2	5.6	8.7	-0.1	1.71	11.0
2021	87,923,000	1,204,000	566,000	638,000	13.7	6.4	7.3	-0.1	1.69	10.7
2022	88,550,000	1,151,000	531,000	620,000	13	6	7	0.1	1.7	10

Notes

^{1} per 1000
^{2} TFR = number of children per woman
^{3} per 1000 births

=== Registered births and deaths ===
Note that registrations may be by year of registration and not by year of occurrence. This was especially the case in the beginning of the 1980s when there were many late registrations. This explains the high number of births in 1980–1986. Before 1980, the registrations were incomplete.

	Average population	Live births	Deaths	Natural change	Crude birth rate (per 1000)	Crude death rate (per 1000)	Natural change (per 1000)	Crude migration rate (per 1000)	Total Fertility Rate
1959		864,846	176,268	688,578					
1960		876,206	171,040	705,166					
1961		902,260	159,371	742,889					
1962		957,500	165,488	792,012					
1963		920,967	135,912	785,055					
1964		1,118,911	145,174	973,737					
1965		1,139,663	171,940	967,723					
1966		1,101,606	178,991	922,615					
1967		1,019,373	179,159	840,214					
1968		1,037,022	174,201	862,821					
1969		1,091,513	167,660	923,853					
1970		1,189,203	163,430	1,025,773					
1971		1,231,227	149,325	1,081,902					
1972		1,138,843	153,568	985,275					
1973		1,199,777	155,081	1,044,696					
1974		1,248,256	149,785	1,098,471					
1975		1,339,267	148,543	1,190,724					
1976		1,401,426	155,981	1,245,445					
1977		1,399,977	146,369	1,253,608					
1978		1,369,597	127,587	1,242,010					
1979		1,689,908	142,402	1,547,506					
1980		2,450,308	162,176	2,288,132					
1981		2,421,611	178,099	2,243,512					
1982		2,101,894	200,614	1,901,280					
1983		2,203,448	207,228	1,996,220					
1984		2,067,803	186,440	1,881,363					
1985		2,033,285	190,061	1,843,224					
1986		2,259,055	199,511	2,059,544					
1987		1,832,089	204,230	1,627,859					
1988		1,944,149	238,390	1,705,759					
1989		1,784,811	199,645	1,585,166					
1990		1,722,977	217,597	1,505,380					
1991		1,582,931	217,637	1,365,294					
1992		1,433,243	188,647	1,244,596					
1993		1,388,017	208,161	1,179,856					
1994		1,426,784							3.50
1995		1,205,372							3.22
1996		1,187,903							2.95
1997		1,179,260							2.73
1998		1,185,639	551,345	634,294					2.53
1999	62,738,000	1,177,557	374,838	802,719	18.8	6.0	12.8		2.36
2000	63,658,000	1,095,165	382,674	712,491	17.2	6.0	11.2	3.26	2.19
2001	64,592,000	1,110,836	421,525	689,311	17.2	6.5	10.7	3.80	2.09
2002	65,540,000	1,122,104	337,237	784,867	17.1	5.1	12.0	2.50	2.01
2003	66,480,000	1,171,573	368,518	803,055	17.6	5.5	12.1	2.06	1.92
2004	67,477,000	1,154,368	355,213	799,155	17.1	5.3	11.8	2.93	1.87
2005	69,672,000	1,239,408	363,723	875,685	18.1	5.3	12.8	18.93	1.82
2006	70,554,000	1,253,912	408,566	845,346	17.8	5.8	12.0	0.52	1.79
2007	71,336,000	1,286,716	412,736	873,980	18.0	5.8	12.2	−1.29	1.81
2008	72,120,000	1,300,166	417,798	882,368	17.9	5.8	12.2	−1.36	1.80
2009	72,924,000	1,348,546	393,514	955,032	18.3	5.3	13.0	−2.08	1.78
2010	73,762,000	1,363,542	441,042	922,500	18.3	5.9	12.4	−1.15	1.77
2011	74,634,000	1,382,229	422,133	960,096	18.3	5.6	12.7	−1.18	1.74
2012	75,539,000	1,421,689	367,512	1,054,177	18.7	4.8	13.9	−1.97	1.73
2013	76,481,000	1,471,834	372,279	1,099,555	19.1	4.8	14.3	−2.06	1.70
2014	77,465,000	1,534,362	446,333	1,088,029	19.8	5.8	14.0	−1.34	1.68
2015	78,492,000	1,570,219	374,827	1,195,392	20.0	4.8	15.2	−2.14	2.16
2016	79,926,000	1,528,053	388,792	1,139,261	19.2	4.9	14.3	3.69	2.11
2017	80,960,000	1,487,923	369,751	1,118,172	19.0	4.6	14.4	−1.04	2.09
2018	81,865,000	1,366,519	376,731	989,788	16.9	4.6	12.3	−1.03	1.95
2019	82,585,000	1,196,132	395,319	800,813	14.4	4.8	9.6	−0.98	1.77
2020	83,220,000	1,114,128	511,881	602,247	13.4	6.2	7.5	0.39	1.65
2021	83,935,000	1,116,212	544,517	571,695	13.2	6.4	6.8	1.70	1.61
2022	84,700,000	1,075,381	395,727	679,654	12.7	4.7	8.0		1.55(e)
2023	85,329,000	1,057,948	403,202	654,746	12.4	4.7	7.7		1.52(e)
2024	85,961,000	979,923	458,873	521,075	11.4	5.3	6.1		1.44
2025	86,563,000	892,268	451,682	440,586	10.3	5.2	5.1		1.35
2026	87,000,000(e)	830,000(e)			9.54				1.26(e)

View source data.
View source data.
View source data.
View source data.
View source data.

==== Current vital statistics ====
Period	Live births	Deaths	Natural increase
March—October 2025	460,000		
March—October 2026	428,664	225,804	+202,860
Difference	▼ (-7%)		

=== Total fertility rate ===
In 1960, Iran's fertility rate was 7.3 children per woman. In 2021, the rate had fallen to 1.7 children per woman. According to a study through the Australian National University, there are both micro and macro factors affecting the fertility rate in Iran, including education, economics, and culture. Micro-factors can include family income levels and individual choices, while macro-factors can include the country's economy, education, and shifting cultural values.

The cross-sectional cohort study examined four provinces in Iran (Gilan, Sistan & Baluchistan, West Azerbaijan, and Yazd) and found that trends show that women in all four provinces are choosing to have fewer children compared to the women born in the earlier cohorts. The majority of women agreed with statements such as "having many children is an obstacle for the parents' interests" and "having many children creates financial pressure for the family", among others.

Other sources also suggest that delayed marriage and a tendency to limit fertility are factors affecting the decline of TFR. A decline in TFR can lead to population decrease, and an ageing population, which can negatively impact the country's economy. In response, Iranian policymakers have attempted to limit these factors by restricting access to contraceptives and surgeries that reduce fertility.

==== Before 1950 ====
Years	1925	1926	1927	1928	1929	1930	1931	1932	1933	1934
Total Fertility Rate in Iran	7.08	7.07	7.07	7.06	7.05	7.05	7.04	7.03	7.03	7.02

Years	1935	1936	1937	1938	1939	1940	1941	1942	1943	1944
Total Fertility Rate in Iran	7.01	7.01	7	6.99	6.99	6.98	6.97	6.97	6.96	6.95

Years	1945	1946	1947	1948	1949
Total Fertility Rate in Iran	6.95	6.94	6.93	6.93	6.92

=== Life expectancy ===
Life expectancy in Iran since 1950

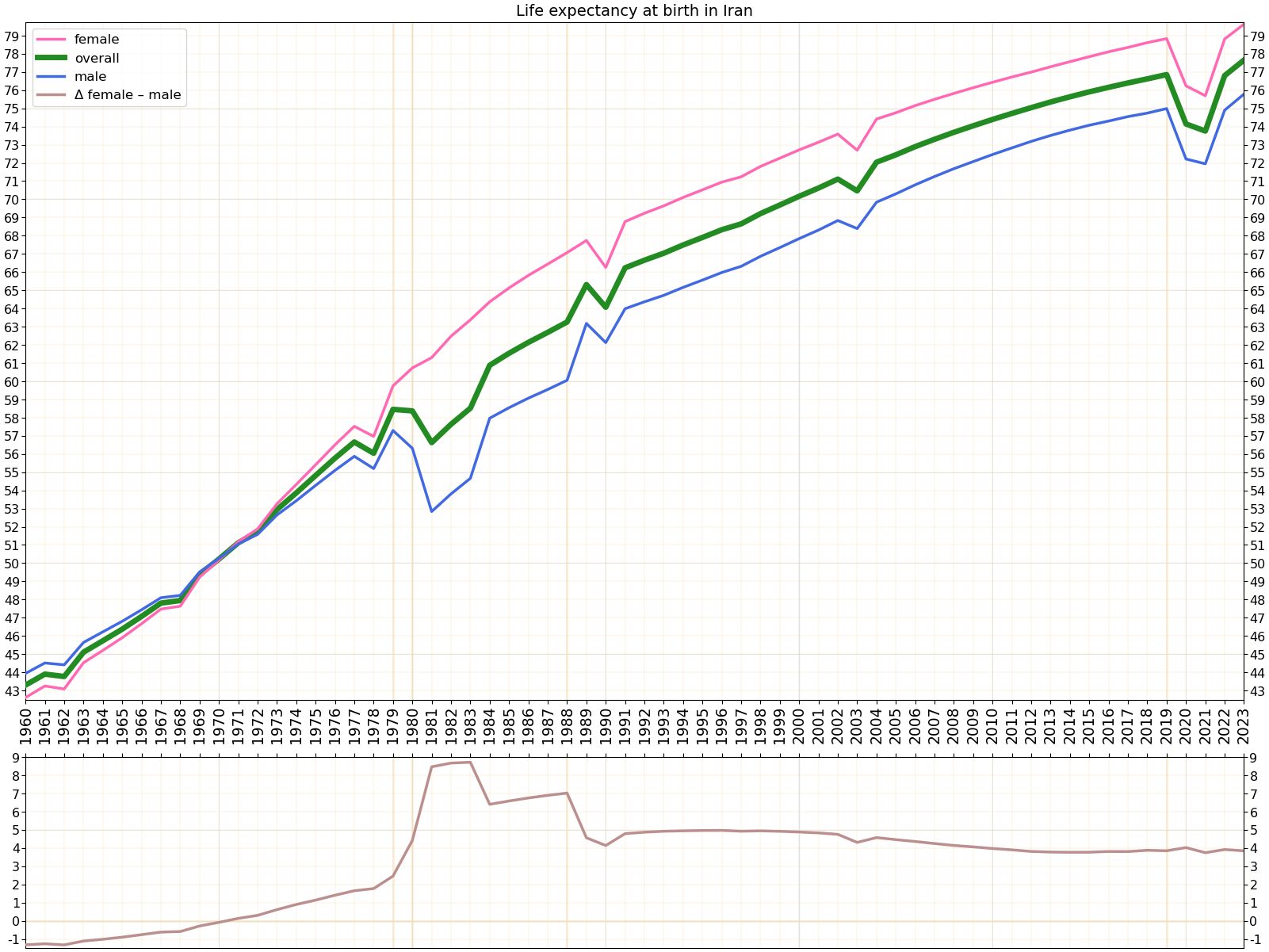
Life expectancy in Iran since 1960 by gender

Sex ratio

at birth: 1.05 male(s)/female
0–14 years: 1.05 male(s)/female
15–24 years: 1.05 male(s)/female
25–54 years: 1.04 male(s)/female
55–64 years: 0.96 male(s)/female
65 years and over: 0.87 male(s)/female
total population: 1.03 male(s)/female (2020 est.)

Life expectancy at birth

total population: 75.06 years
male: 73.71 years
female: 76.48 years (2021 est.)

== Ethnic groups ==
Iran is a mosaic of diverse ethnic groups, contrary to popular belief that all Iranians are "just Persian". According to a 1939 survey and Anthropological study of the people of Iran, these were the ethnic groups that resided in the following areas of Iran:

District	Locality	Sedentary population (approx.)	Chief town	Ethnic Group
Abadeh-i-Iqlid	Northern Fars	25,000	Abadeh	Chiefly Lashani and Cheharrahi
Abadeh-i-Tashk	Near Daryacheh-i-Tashk	6,500	Abadeh-i-Tashk	Chiefly Lashani and Cheharrahi
Abraj	West of Mahin	1,000	N/A	Turkics and Persians
Aftar	Southwest of Jahrom	3,000	Abi-i-Garm	Turkics and Persians
'Alamarvdakht	Southern Fars	4,000	'Alamarvdakht	Chiefly Behbehani Lurs with some Arab blood
Angali	Northeast of Bushire	2,000	Mahmud Shahi	Chiefly Behbehani Lurs with some Arab blood
Arbaeh, Mahals-i	South of Firuzabad	1,000	Hangam	Turkics from Simakan
Ardakan	Northwest of Shiraz	6,000	Ardakan	Turkics from Simakan
Arisinjan	Northeast of Shiraz	5,000	Arisinjan	Turkics from Simakan
Asir	Near the 'Alamarvdakht	5,500	Asir	Turkics from Simakan
Baiza, Dasht-i	Northwest of Shiraz	1,200	Bandar Dilam	Turkics from Simakan
Bandar Dilam	Northwest coast of Fars	10,000	Bandar Dilam	Turkics from Simakan
Bawanat	Northeastern Fars	12,000	Bawanat	Turkics from Simakan
Bidshahr (or Juwun-i-Bidshahr)	South of Jahrum		Bidshahr	Dashtis
Borazjan	Northeast of Bushire	6,500	Borazjan	Dashtis
Chah Kutah	East of Bushire	1,500	Chah Kutah	Dashtis
Chehar Dungeh, Sarhad-i-	Northern Fars	3,000	Asupas	Dashtis
Dalaki	Northeast of Bushire	N/A	Dalaki	Dashtis
Darab	Southeastern Fars	10,000	Darab	Dashtis
Dashti	Southeast of Bushire	20,000	Khurmuj	Dashtis
Dashtistan	East of Bushire	15,000	Borazjan	Immigrants from Dashti or Shiraz
Dizkurd	Northwestern Fars	500	N/A	Circassians
Istehbanat	South of Niriz	4,000	Istehbanat	Mainly Turkic and Lurs
Jahrum	South central Fars	7,500	Jahrum	Mainly Turkic and Lurs
Jireh	East of Bushire	2,500	Jireh	Mainly Turkic and Lurs
-	-	-	-	-
Shibkuh ports	West of Ras Bustaneh	-	-	Sunni and Shia Arabs
Minab	-	-	-	An ethnic group of mixed Persian, Baluchi, Arab, and Sub-Saharan African descent.
Laristan	Laristan region	90,000		Those living on the coast line are to a great extent Arabs (Huwala), while the farmers are principally Persians [Iranis].

=== Genetics ===
==== Haplogroups ====
===== Y-chromosome DNA =====
Y-Chromosome DNA Y-DNA represents the male lineage, the Iranian Y-chromosome pool is as follows where haplogroups, R1 (25%), J2 (23%) G (14%), J1 (8%) E1b1b (5%), L (4%), Q (4%), comprise more than 85% of the total chromosomes.

Haplogroup	n	B	C	E1b1a	E1b1b1a2	E1b1b1a3	E1b1b1c	F	G	H	I	J1	J2	K	L	N	O	P,R	Q	R1a	R1b	R1b1a	R1b1b	R2	T
Marker				M2	V13	V22	M34														M343	V88	M269		M70
Iran	566	0.53	0.18	1.41	1.77	1.8	0.88	0.35	14.00	2.65	0.8	8.13	23.86	0.71	4.00	2.12	1.41	0.71	4.01	17.49	1.24	0.35	6.18	1.41	2.12

===== Mitochondrial DNA =====
Mitochondrial DNA (mtDNA) represents the female lineage. West Eurasian mtDNA makes up over 90% of the Iranian population on average. (2013).

Among them, U3b3 lineages appear to be restricted to populations of Iran and the Caucasus, while the sub-cluster U3b1a is common in the whole Near East region.

In Iran outliers in the Y-chromosomes and Mitochondrial DNA gene pool are consisted of the north Iranian ethnicities, such as the Gilaks and Mazandarani's, whose genetic build up including chromosomal DNA are nearly identical to the major South Caucasian ethnicities, namely the Georgians, Armenians and Azerbaijani's. Other outliers are made by the Baloch people, representing a mere 1–2% of the total Iranian population, who have more patrilinial and mitochondrial DNA lines leaning towards northwest South Asian ethnic groups.

Levels of genetic variation in Iranian populations are comparable to the other groups from the Caucasus, Anatolia and Europe.

==== Autosomal DNA ====
A large-scale genetic analyses on various ethnic groups of Iran, published in 2019, found that genetically speaking different Iranian ethnic groups, such as Persians, Kurds, Azerbaijanis, Lurs, Mazanderanis, Gilaks and Arabs, cluster tightly together, forming a single cluster known as the "CIC" (Central Iranian cluster). Compared with worldwide populations, Iranians (CIC) cluster in the center of the wider West Eurasian cluster, close to Europeans, Middle Easterners, and South-Central Asians. Iranian Arabs and Turkic-speaking Azeris genetically overlap with Iranian-speaking peoples such as Persians. The genetic substructure of Iranians was found to be low, compared with other "1000G" populations. Iranians display their highest genetic affinity with other Southwest and West Asian populations, followed by Europeans and Central Asian groups. Certain South Asians (specifically the Parsi minority) showed the highest affinity with Iranians, inline with their ethnic history. Overall, the study results suggest that the genetic makeup of the Iranian gene pool formed already about 5,000 years ago and shows high continuity since then, suggesting that they were largely unaffected by migration events from outside groups. On a global scale, Iranians display their highest affinity with other "West Eurasian" populations (such as Europeans or South Asians, but also Latin Americans), while Sub-Saharan Africans and East Asians showed large degrees of differentiation with Iranians.

== Languages and ethnic groups ==
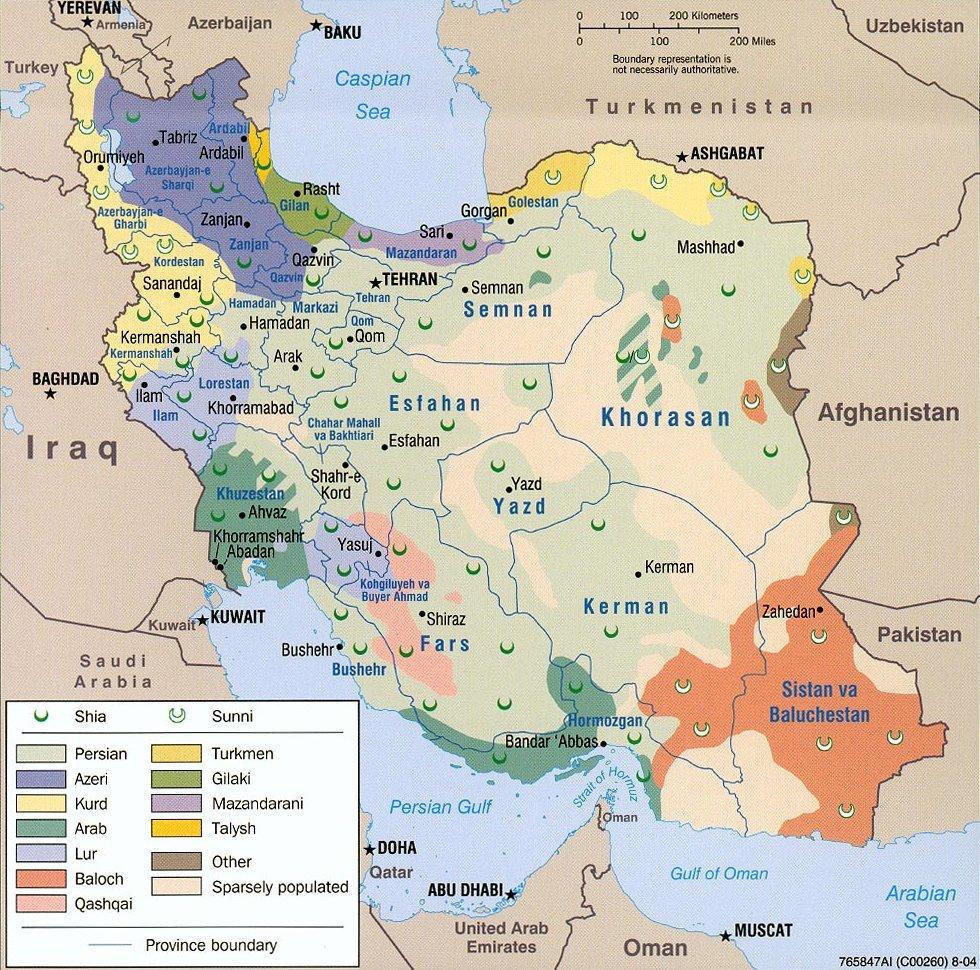
Colour-coded map of Iran's ethnic groups. The centre of the country is mostly Persians; Azerbaijanis, Gilaks, Kurds, and Talysh are in the northwest; Lurs, Qashqai and Arabs in the southwest; Turkmens and more Kurds in the northeast; Balochis in the southeast.

The largest linguistic group comprises speakers of Iranian languages, like modern Persian, Kurdish, Gilaki, Mazandarani, Luri, Talysh, and Balochi. Speakers of Turkic languages, most notably Azerbaijani Turkish spoken by Azerbaijanis, which is by far the second-most spoken language in the country, but also the Turkmen, and the Qashqai peoples, comprise a substantial minority. The remainder are primarily speakers of Semitic languages such as Arabic and Assyrian. A small number of Mandaeans in Khuzestan speak Mandaic. There are small groups using other Indo-European languages such as Armenian and Russian; also, Georgian (a member of the Kartvelian language family) is spoken in a large pocket only by those Iranian Georgians that live in Fereydan, Fereydunshahr. Most of those Georgians who live in the north Iranian provinces of Gilan, Mazandaran, Isfahan, Tehran province and the rest of Iran no longer speak the language. The Circassians in Iran, a very large minority in the past and speakers of the Circassian language, have been strongly assimilated and absorbed within the population in the past few centuries. However, significant pockets do exist spread over the country, and they are the second-largest Caucasus-derived group in the nation after the Georgians.

Jews have had a continuous presence in Iran since the time of Cyrus the Great of the Achaemenid Empire. In 1948, there were approximately 140,000–150,000 Jews living in Iran. According to the Tehran Jewish Committee, the Jewish population of Iran was (more recently) estimated at 25,000 to 35,000, of which approximately 15,000 are in Tehran with the rest residing in Hamadan, Shiraz, Isfahan, Kermanshah, Yazd, Kerman, Rafsanjan, Borujerd, Sanandaj, Tabriz, and Urmia. However, the official 2011 state census recorded only 8,756 Jews in Iran.

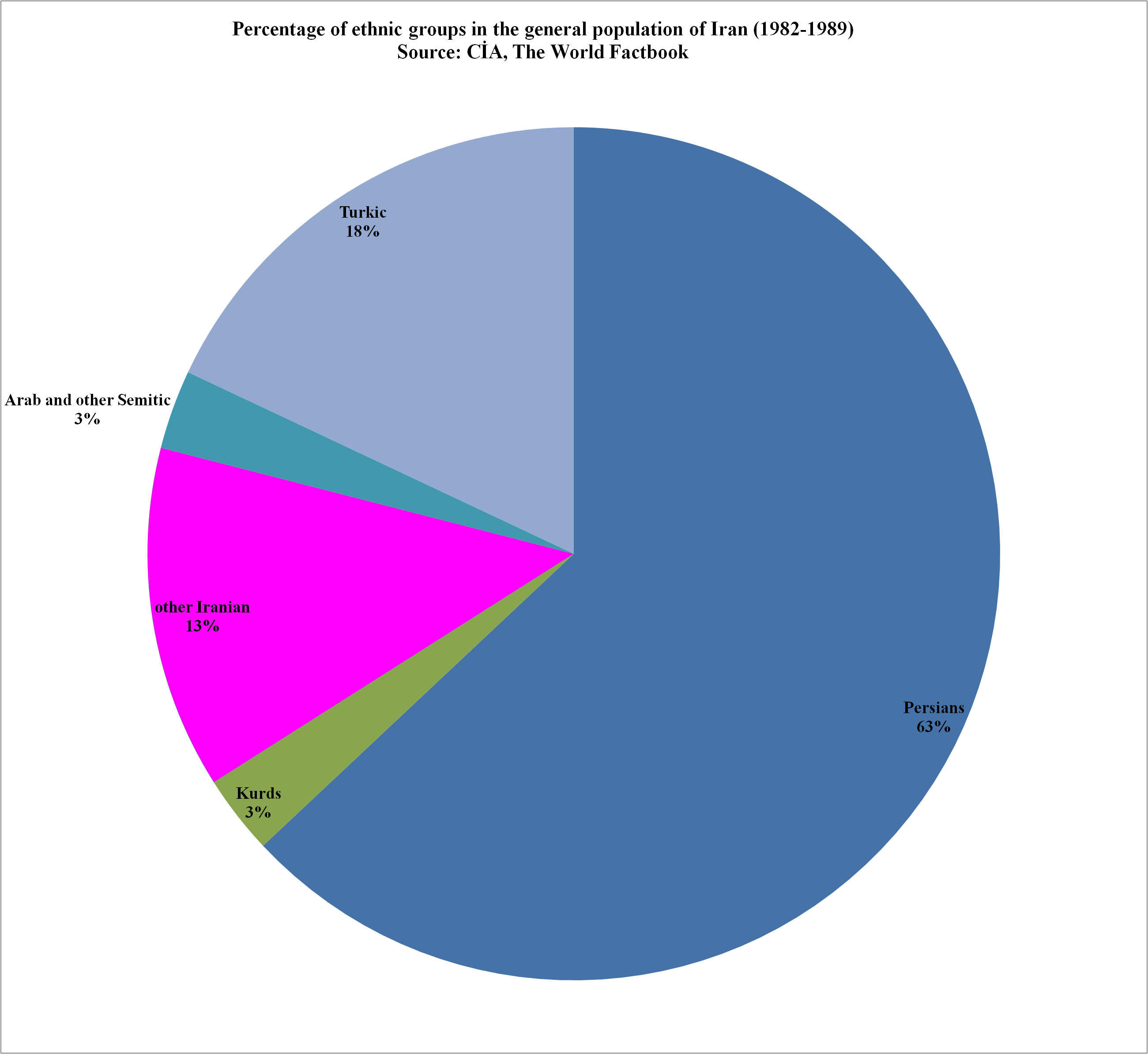

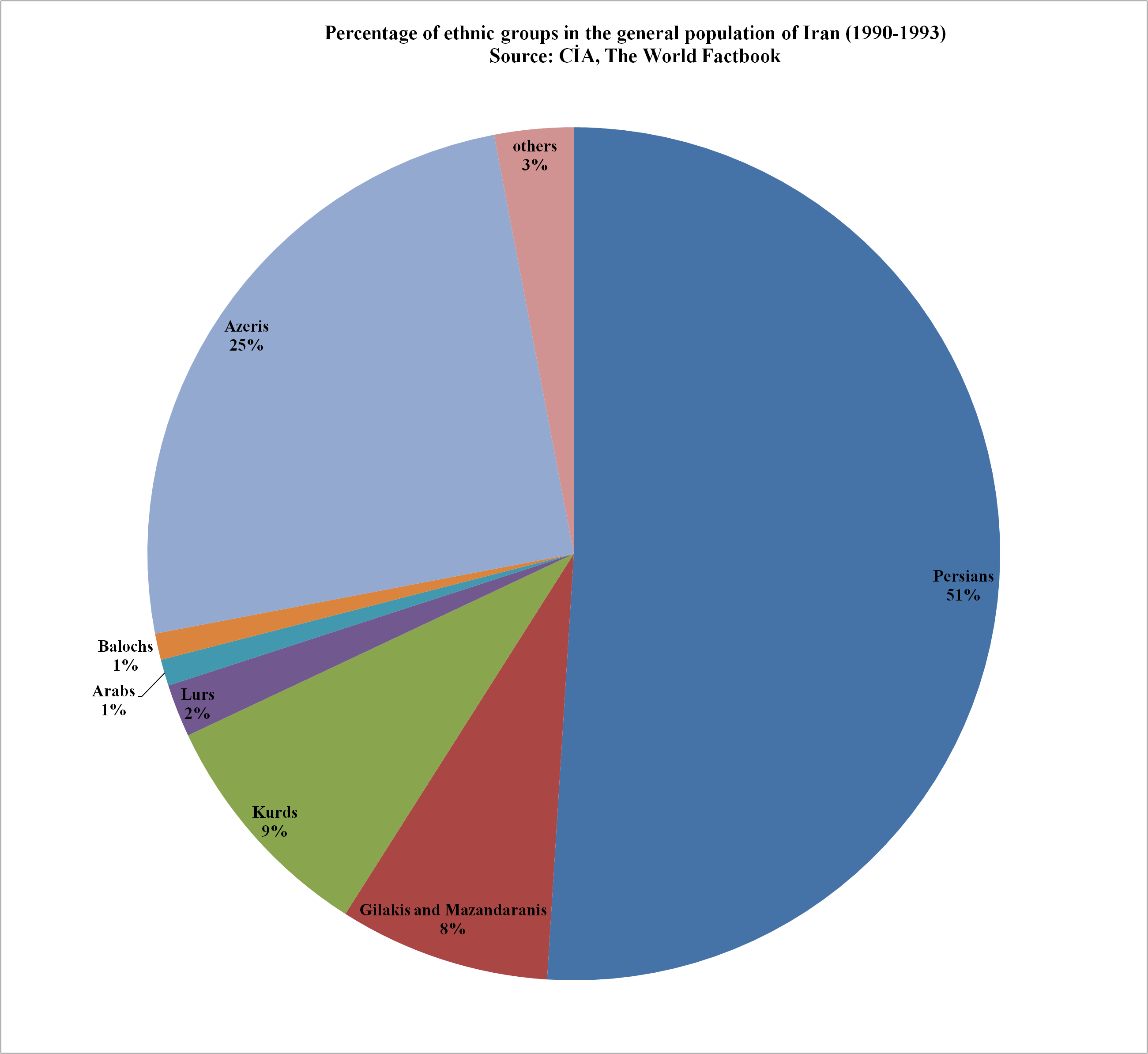

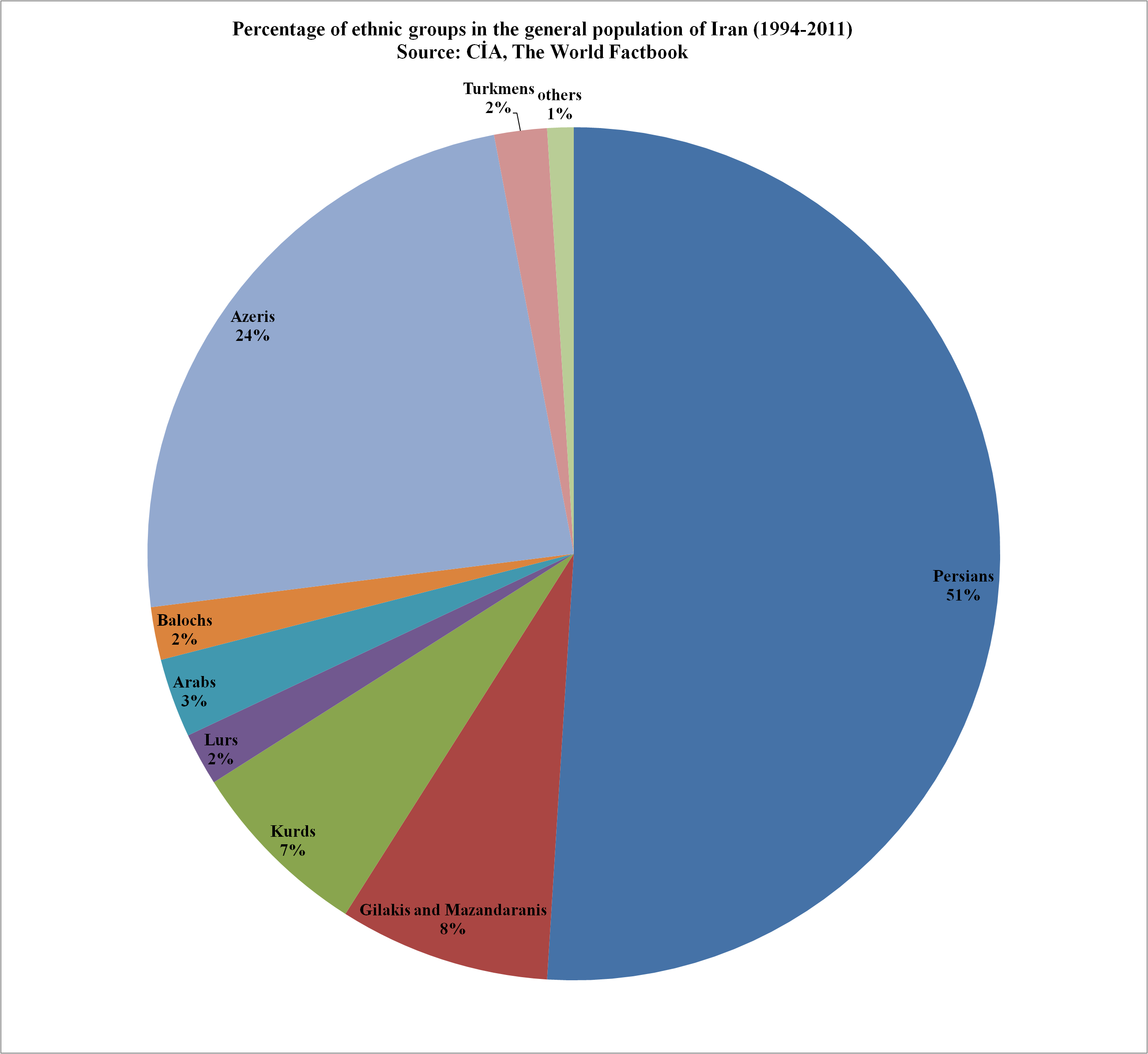

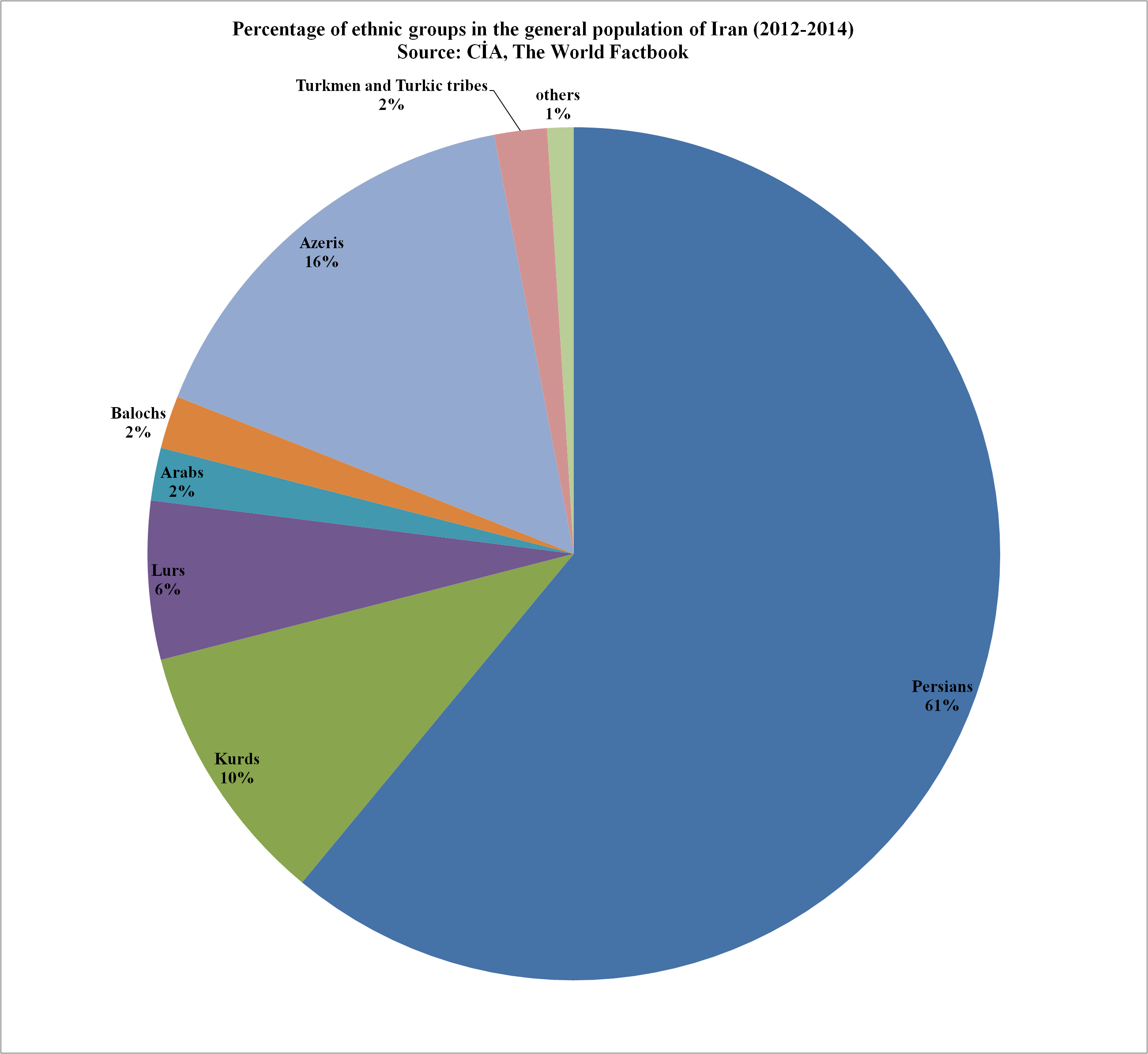

The CIA World Factbook (which is based on 2013 statistics) gives the following numbers for the languages spoken in Iran today: Persian, Luri, Gilaki and Mazandarani 66%; Turkish and other Turkic languages 18%; Kurdish 10%; Arabic 2%; Balochi 2%; others 2% (Armenian, Georgian, Circassian, Assyrian, etc.).

According to anthropologist Brian Spooner, around half of Iran's population uses a language other than Persian at home and in informal public situations.

Other sources, such as the Library of Congress, and the Encyclopedia of Islam (Leiden) give Iran's ethnic groups as following: Persians 65%, Azerbaijani Turks 16%, Kurds 7%, Lurs 6%, Arabs 2%, Baloch 2%, Turkmens 1%, Turkic tribal groups (e.g. Qashqai) 1%, and non-Persian, non-Turkic groups (e.g. Armenians, Georgians, Assyrians, Circassians) less than 1%. For sources prior to and after 2000, see Languages and ethnicities in Iran.

== Religious affiliations ==
Religion in Iran by CIA
1. Shia Islam (94.1%)
2. Sunni Islam (5.30%)
3. Other/Unspecifed (0.60%)

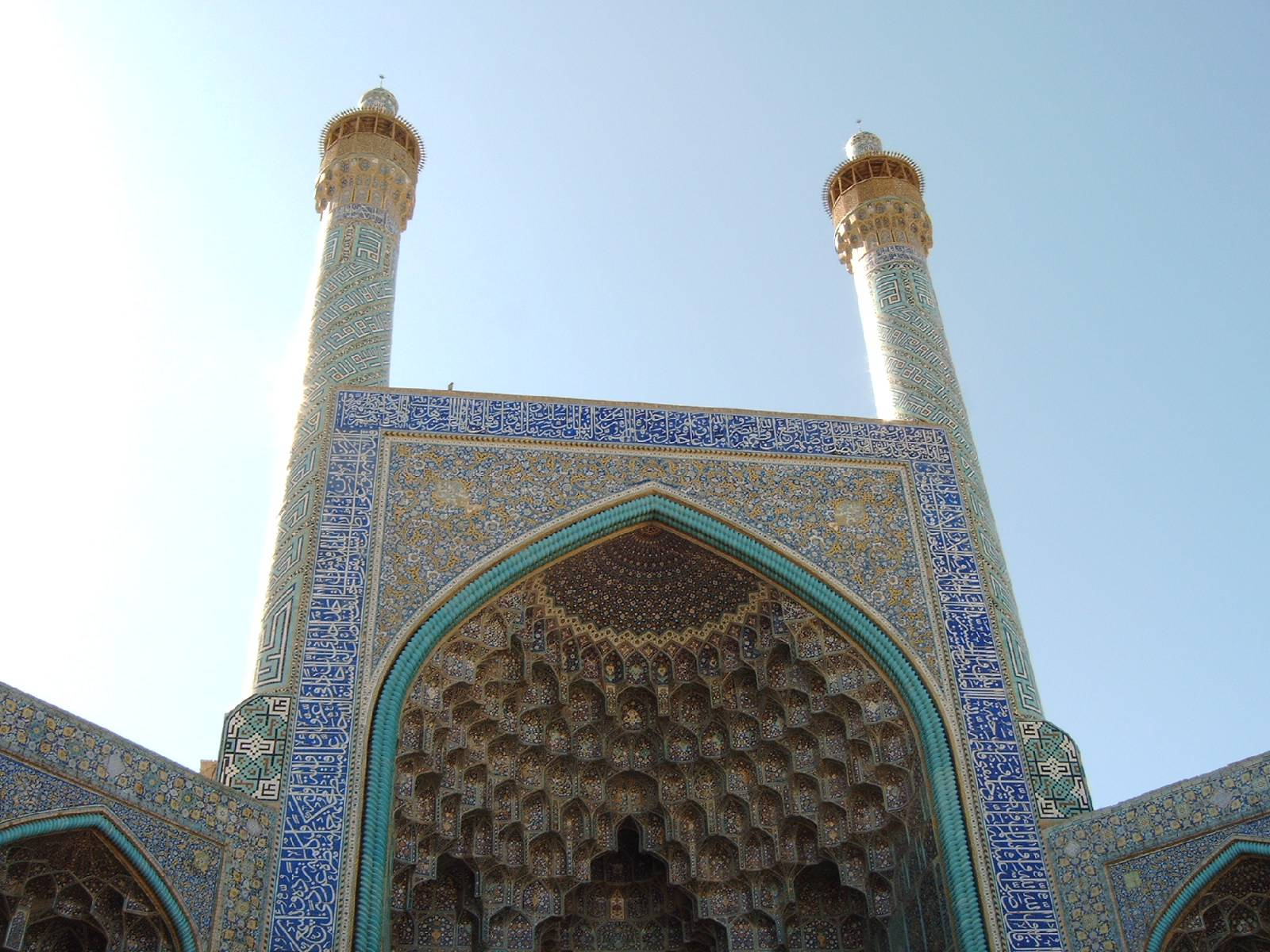
The entrance to Shah Mosque (aka Imam Mosque or Shah Jame' Mosque) in Isfahan, a prominent example of Persian architecture during the Safavid era.

About 99% of the Iranians are Muslims; 90% belong to the Shi'a branch of Islam, the official state religion, and about 9% belong to the Sunni branch, which predominates in neighbouring Muslim countries. Less than 1% non-Muslim minorities include Christians, Zoroastrians, Jews, Baháʼís, Mandaeans, and Yarsan. By far the largest group of Christians in Iran are Armenians under the Armenian Apostolic Church which has 41,385 adherents as of 2016 census. There are hundreds of Christian churches in Iran. The Baháʼí Faith, Iran's largest non-Muslim religious minority with a population around 300,000, is not officially recognised (and therefore not included in the census results), and has been persecuted since its inception in Iran. Since the 1979 revolution the persecution of Baháʼís has increased with executions, the denial of civil rights and liberties, and the denial of access to higher education and employment. Unofficial estimates for the Assyrian Christian population range between 20,000, and 70,000. The number of Iranian Mandaeans is a matter of dispute. In 2009, there were an estimated 5,000 to 10,000 Mandaeans in Iran, according to the Associated Press. Whereas Alarabiya has put the number of Iranian Mandaeans as high as 60,000 in 2011.

Population of Iran according to religion 1956–2016
	Muslims		Christians		Zoroastrians		Jews		Other		Unknown	
	#	%	#	%	#	%	#	%	#	%	#	%
census 1956	18,654,127	98.4%	114,528	0.6%	15,723	0.1%	65,232	0.3%	59,256	0.3%	45,838	0.2%
census 1966	24,771,922	98.8%	149,427	0.6%	19,816	0.1%	60,683	0.2%	77,075	0.3%		
census 1976	33,396,908	99.1%	168,593	0.5%	21,400	0.1%	62,258	0.2%			59,583	0.2%
census 2006	70,097,741	99.4%	109,415	0.2%	19,823	0.0%	9,252	0.0%	54,234	0.1%	205,317	0.3%
census 2011	74,682,938	99.4%	117,704	0.2%	25,271	0.0%	8,756	0.0%	49,101	0.1%	265,899	0.4%
census 2016	79,598,054	99.6%	130,158	0.2%	23,109	0.0%	9,826	0.0%	40,551	0.1%	124,572	0.2%

== Migration ==
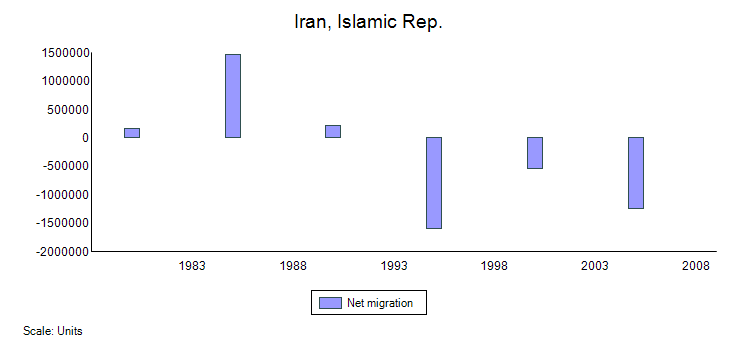
Net Iranian migration, 1979–2008. A positive value represents more people entering Iran than leaving it

=== Recent immigration ===
Most of the large Circassian migrational waves towards mainland Iran stem from the Safavid and Qajar era. A certain amount is from the relatively recent arrivals that migrated as the Circassians were displaced from the Caucasus in the 19th century. A Black African population exists due to historical slavery. A substantial number of Russians arrived in the early 20th century as refugees from the Russian Revolution, but their number has dwindled following the Iran crisis of 1946 and the Iranian Revolution.

In the 20th to 21st centuries, there has been limited immigration to Iran from Turkey, Iraq (especially huge numbers during the 1970s known as Moaveds), Afghanistan (mostly arriving as refugees in 1978), Lebanon (especially in Qom, though a Lebanese community has been present in the nation for centuries), India (mostly arriving temporarily during the 1950s to 1970s, typically working as doctors, engineers, and teachers), Korea (mostly in the 1970s as labour migrants), China (mostly since the 2000s working in engineering or business projects), and Pakistan, partly due to labour migrants and partly to Balochi ties across the Iranian-Pakistani border. About 200,000 Iraqis arrived as refugees in 2003, mostly living in refugee camps near the border; an unknown number of these has since returned to Iraq.

As of 2025, around 400,000 authorized foreigners were working in Iran, most of whom were Afghan nationals.

Over the same period, there has also been substantial emigration from Iran, especially since the Iranian revolution (see Iranian diaspora, Human capital flight from Iran, Jewish exodus from Iran), especially to the United States, Canada, Germany, Israel, and Sweden.

==== Refugee population ====
Iran hosts one of the largest refugee population in the world, with more than one million refugees, mostly from Afghanistan (80%) and Iraq (10%). Since 2006, Iranian officials have been working with the UNHCR and Afghan officials for their repatriation. Between 1979 and 1997, UNHCR spent more than US$1 billion on Afghan refugees in Pakistan but only $150 million on those in Iran. In 1999, the Iranian government estimated the cost of maintaining its refugee population at US$10 million per day, compared with the US$18 million UNHCR allocated for all of its operations in Iran in 1999. As of 2016, some 300,000 work permits have been issued for foreign nationals in Iran.

In mid-2025, Iran's government ordered the mass deportation of undocumented Afghans, targeting an estimated 4 million migrants and refugees residing in the country. Iranian authorities expelled approximately 1.6 million undocumented Afghan migrants between January and October 2025.

=== Emigration ===
The term "Iranian citizens abroad" or "Iranian/Persian diaspora" refers to the Iranian people and their children born in Iran but living outside of Iran. Migrant Iranian workers abroad remitted less than two billion dollars home in 2006.

As of 2010, there are about 4–5 million Iranians living abroad, mostly in the United States, Canada, Europe, Persian Gulf States, Turkey, Australia and the broader Middle East. According to the 2000 Census and other independent surveys, there are an estimated 1 million Iranian-Americans living in the U.S., in particular, the Los Angeles area is estimated to be host to approximately 72,000 Iranians, earning the Westwood area of LA the nickname Tehrangeles. Other metropolises that have large Iranian populations include Dubai with 300,000 Iranians, Vancouver, London, Toronto, San Francisco Bay Area, Washington D.C., Buenos Aires, Mexico City, Stockholm, Berlin, Hamburg and Frankfurt. Their combined net worth is estimated to be $1.3 trillion.

Note that this differs from the other Iranian peoples living in other areas of Greater Iran, who are of related ethnolinguistical family, speaking languages belonging to the Iranian languages which is a branch of Indo-European languages.

== People of Iranian ancestry ==
=== Tats (Caucasus) ===
The Tats are an Iranian people, presently living within Azerbaijan and Russia (mainly Southern Dagestan). The Tats are part of the indigenous peoples of Iranian origin in the Caucasus.

Tats use the Tat language, a southwestern Iranian language and a variety of Persian Azerbaijani and Russian are also spoken. Tats are mainly Shia Muslims, with a significant Sunni Muslim minority. Likely the ancestors of modern Tats settled in South Caucasus when the Sasanian Empire (224–651) built cities and founded military garrisons to strengthen their positions in the region.

=== Parsis ===
The Parsis are the close-knit Zoroastrian community based primarily in India but also found in Pakistan. Parsis are descended from Persian Zoroastrians who emigrated to the Indian subcontinent over 1,000 years ago. Indian census data (2001) records 69,601 Parsis in India, with a concentration in and around the city of Mumbai. There are approximately 8,000 Parsis elsewhere on the subcontinent, with an estimated 2,500 Parsis in the city of Karachi and approximately 50 Parsi families in Sri Lanka. The number of Parsis worldwide is estimated to be fewer than 100,000.

==== "Iranis" ====
In Pakistan and India, the term "Irani" has come to denote Iranian Zoroastrians who have migrated to Pakistan and India within the last two centuries, as opposed to most Parsis who arrived in the subcontinent over 1,000 years ago. Many of them moved during the Qajar era, when persecution of Iranian Zoroastrians was rampant. They are culturally and linguistically closer to the Zoroastrians of Iran. Unlike the Parsis, they speak a Dari dialect, the language spoken by the Iranian Zoroastrians in Yazd and Kerman.

Their last names often resemble modern Iranian names. Irani is a common surname among them. In India they are mostly located in modern-day Mumbai while in Pakistan they are mostly located in modern-day Karachi. In both Pakistan and India, they are famous for their restaurants and tea-houses. Some, such as Ardeshir Irani, have also become very famous in cinema.

=== Ajam (Bahrain) ===
The "Ajam" are an ethnic community of Bahrain, of Iranian origin. They have traditionally been merchants living in specific quarters of Manama and Muharraq. The Iranians who adhere to Shiite sect of Islam are Ajam, and they are different from the Huwala. Ajams are also a large percentage of the populace in UAE, Kuwait, Qatar and Oman.

In addition to this, many names of ancient villages in Bahrain are of Persian origin. It is believed that these names were given during the Safavid rule of Bahrain (1501–1722). i.e. Karbabad, Salmabad, Karzakan, Duraz, Barbar, which indicates that the history of Ajams is much older.

=== Huwala ===
Huwala are the descendants of Persians and Arab-Persians who belong to the Sunni sect of Islam. Huwala migrated from Ahvaz in Iran to the Persian Gulf in the seventeenth and eighteenth century.

== See also ==
- Culture of Iran
- Economy of Iran
- Education in Iran
- Ethnic groups in West Asia
- Health care in Iran
  - Family planning in Iran
- Human rights in Iran
- Human capital flight from Iran
- Immigration to Iran
- Iranian names
- Social class in Iran
- Women in Iran
- List of Iranians
- Ethnic-based discrimination in Iran
- Youth in Iran
