= Jawad (disambiguation) =

Jawad is a village in Madhya Pradesh, India.

Jawad may also refer to:

- Jawad (name), an Arabic given name and surname (including a list of people with the name)
- Jawad (Vidhan Sabha constituency), a legislative assembly constituency of Madhya Pradesh, India
- Bin Jawad, a town in the Sirte District in Libya
- Bin Jawad District, a district in Libya from 1983 to 1987
- Javad, a Persian variant of the name

== See also ==
- Cavad, a village and municipality in the Sabirabad Rayon of Azerbaijan
- Haji Javad Mosque, a mosque in Baku, Azerbaijan in Jasamali area
- United States v. Jawad, a Guantanamo military commission
- Javad Khanate, a khanate in the territory of modern Azerbaijan
- Javad Uyezd, an administrative unit within the Baku Governorate and Azerbaijan SSR
- Jawad (Vidhan Sabha constituency), a legislative assembly constituency of Madhya Pradesh, India
- Javad-e Seyyedi, a village in Izeh County, Khuzestan Province, Iran
