= Iranians in Iraq =

Iraqi community of Iranian origin

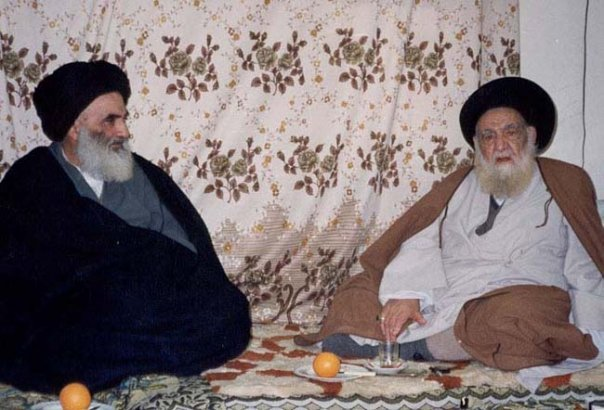
- Ali al-Sistani and Abu al-Qasim al-Khoei, two prominent community leaders

Languages
- Mainly Arabic and Persian, as well as Kurdish, Aramaic, Armenian, Turkic

Religion
- Predominantly Shia Islam

Related ethnic groups
- Iranian diaspora and other Iranian peoples

Iranians in Iraq, also referred to as Iranian-Iraqis, (Persian: ایرانیان عراق, Arabic: إيرانيون العراق) Iraqi Persians, (Persian: پارس‌های عراق, Arabic: فرس العراق) or Ajam, (Persian: عجم, Arabic: العجم) are Iraqis of Iranian origin. They have had a long presence in Iraq, dating back to the Fall of Babylon. They are generally ethnic Persians, but may also include Arabs, Kurds, Assyrians, Turks, Jews, and others in Iraq with a connection to Iran.

== History ==
For over a thousand years from 500 BC until the Islamic conquest of Persia, the territory of Iraq had been ruled by the Persians, although with some interruptions. However, Persians were a minority in Iraq, generally comprising soldiers, governors, and clerics. As in other regions, the Persians in Iraq were not homogeneous, and the soldiers, clergy, and bureaucrats were classes with independent hierarchies or distinctive attire. Despite ethnic Persians always having been a minority in Iraq, they had a long presence there, and formed the ruling class for thousands of years. The Persian population in Mesopotamia under the Sassanids was clustered along the western and southern frontiers as military garrisons. Persian families of noble lineage lived in the main cities, and there were Persian farmers in some of the villages of the Sawad. Around 12,000 Persians from Istakhr, Isfahan, and other regions were settled at Nisibis in the 4th century, and their descendents remained there at the beginning of the 7th century. Persians also lived at Tikrit, Ctesiphon, Veh-Ardashir, Kaskar, and Maysan. Persians also lived in the districts between the Tigris river and the Zagros foothills. Most Iraqi Persians were Zoroastrians.

Before the Islamic conquest, Mesopotamia formed the central province of the Sassanids, and was referred to as "del-e Irānšahr" (the heart of Iranian kingdom) in medieval Islamic sources. After the Islamic conquests, most Iraqi Persians either died in battle or fled to other regions of the Sasanian Empire. There were some factors to why the Persians left Iraq while most other communities stayed, mainly as the Persians were the main enemy of the Muslims in battles, and they were not originally from the region. Persian soldiers, bureaucrats, and clergy were the first to leave Iraq, with the remaining Persian merchants, tradesmen, and farmers serving as "dehqans" or immigrated to the east of the Zagros Mountains. They were historically distinguished from the Kurds and Lurs, two other Iranian nations in the nearby Zagros mountains.

After the Battle of al-Qadisiyyah and the Siege of Ctesiphon, the center of the Sasanians, the Muslims had captured Mesopotamia, also entering the lowlands of Khuzestan, and penetrated the Iranian plateau during the Battle of Nahavand in 642, which secured Iraq and Khuzestan for the Muslims and gave them access to the rest of Iran which gradually fell. Because the region around Nahavand, known as Jibal, was so close to Iraq, it was called Iraq-e Ajam. The Umayyads ruled over Persia directly from Iraq, as did the Abbasids, and most Arab settlers in Persia came from Iraq. For the first century after Islam, most Persians in Iraq were brought there as captives. By the 9th century, as the Abbasid military shifted more toward Turks, the control over Persia no longer resided in Iraq. After the Islamic conquest, Persians continued to have a presence in Mesopotamia until the Safavid era, as Persian remained the language of most sedentary people and the chancery as late as the 15th century, according to Hafiz-i Abru, who wrote that in Iraq, the city dwellers, tradesmen, and craftsmen were Persian speakers, the Bedouins were Arabic speakers, and since the Turkic conquests, the governing classes were Turkic speakers, although all three groups generally knew the other languages due to frequent mixture.

Although Baghdad was founded near the ancient Ctesiphon, the Persian settlers had only came after the city was founded, but played a big role in the architectural influence on the original design, and there was also Persian military settlement in the early years of the city. However, around fifty years after Baghdad was founded, the Persian settlers lost connections with their homeland. Al-Fadl ibn Sahl rose in the Abbasid ranks and openly declared his aim of restoring Persian influence and making the Abbasids the true heirs of the Sasanians. Under the Buyids, an Iranian dynasty which was also Shia, the Persian influence greatly increased, although Baghdad was still not considered a Persian city, and while the Persian element was pervasive, it was never overwhelming. Despite the city of Baghdad being in decline, Persians were growing more influential in the city shortly before the Mongols carried out the siege of Baghdad. Persians played a role in the reconstruction of Baghdad afterwards. Baghdad later became the capital of the Jalayirids.

When the Safavids occupied Iraq, during both the first (1508-1533) and second (1622-1638) periods, Shia Persian merchants came to Iraq and procured a good share of the commerce of Baghdad. Early in the 17th century, there were a few thousand Persians in Karbala, Najaf, Kadhimayn, and Baghdad. At that time, there were still no Persians in Basra, which mostly comprised Arabs and some Turks. After the second Ottoman occupation of Baghdad in 1638, around 1,700 Persians in the region were killed and many fled to Persia. The Persian colony in Iraq until 1638 largely comprised merchants and others seeking economic opportunities. Since the main Shia academic centers were in Persia at the time, there were no significant numbers of Persian scholars in Iraq, and it was only from the 18th century that Persian scholars arrived in Iraq on a large scale. After the Afghan invasion of Isfahan in 1722, hundreds of families of Shia scholars were displaced, and many of them fled to Iraq during 1722-1763. The center of Shia scholarship shifted from Persia to Iraq, first to Karbala and then to Najaf, and at that time, the Persian language gained much ground in Iraq, specifically in Karbala, Najaf, Baghdad, and Basra. Persian religious families in Karbala and Najaf managed to overshadow the Arab scholars and dominated the religious circles. By the 20th century, there was a significant Persian population in Baghdad, Basra, and Tawayrej. The position of Persians in Iraq improved after Ottoman-Qajar agreements such as the Treaty of Erzurum in 1823. As they were relatively privileged, important, and had a large presence in holy cities, the Persians in Iraq had an advantage over the Shia Arab population. The increased tolerance for Shia Islam by the Ottomans during the Afsharid and Qajar periods in Iran allowed Persian influence to grow in Iraq, especially among Shia Muslims in the south. The local Persian community were targeted during the Wahhabi sack of Karbala.

The Persians in Iraq were historically considered Persian subjects rather than Ottoman, and the Persian consular offices held extra-territorial jurisdiction over them. The status of Persians in Iraq was a major cause of strained Ottoman-Qajar relations even after their privileges were officially confirmed in 1875. They had signed an agreement recognizing the status of Persian consuls and consular dragomans in the Ottoman Empire as carrying the same privileges enjoyed by their European counterparts. The 1875 agreement affirmed that the Persian consuls were exclusively the authority over Persian subjects in matters of civil and criminal law and of succession. Persian subjects were declared amenable to the jurisdiction of Ottoman courts in cases of violation of the law, and in mixed civil and commercial cases, certain powers of assistance and protection in the proceedings were reserved for the Persian consular representatives. The agreement also exempted Persian subjects from certain taxes to which Ottoman subjects were liable. Although it was declaired that the same provisions would apply to Ottoman subjects in Persia, the Persians were the main beneficiaries of the agreement. Iraqi Persians were considered ethnic Persians and were distinguished from the Arab Shias of southern Iraq who historically adopted Iranian citizenship to escape Ottoman conscription. Rupert Hay claimed that the city of Mandali included Persians along with Kurds, Lurs, and others. Iraqis of Iranian origin who lost their culture and language and Arabized were collectively considered Arabized Iranians, regardless of their Persian, Kurdish, Lur, or other origins.

During the Persian Constitutional Revolution, local committees of Persians in Iraq created Persian-language schools with the backing of scholars such as Mohammad-Kazem Khorasani and Abdollah Mazandarani. The first schools were "Ukhuwwat" ("brotherhood"), an elementary school for boys in Kadhimayn founded in 1907 by "Anjoman-e Okhowwat-e Iranian" ("Iranian Brotherhood Association"), and two coeducational elementary schools, 'Alawi, founded in Najaf in 1908-09 by the local religious establishment, and Hosayni, founded in Karbala by "Anjoman-e Mosawat-e Iranian" ("Iranian Equality Association"). Another elementary school for boys, Sharafat, was founded in Baghdad in 1913 by "Anjoman-e Sharafat-e Iranian" ("Iranian Honor Association"). All four schools later expanded their program to the high school level, in 1936, 1960, 1956, and 1943 respectively. Two others also founded in Najaf and Amarah but closed in World War I. While teaching foreign languages and subjects at schools in Tehran and Tabriz was considered "kufr", the Persian schools in Iraq had more freedom. At the same time, the Persian community in Iraq established more Persian-language newspapers, which had existed in Iraq since the start of the Second Constitutional Era. The Persians in Ottoman Basra were despised by the local Sunnis, although there was no serious tensions.

V. V. Bunak estimated around 90,000 ethnic Persians living mainly in Shia cities of southern Iraq in the early 20th century. The British rough census of 1919 estimated the Persian population in Iraq right before the formation of the monarchy at 80,000, although it very likely exceeded it if it included mixed marriages and families with a generational presence in Iraq who were declared Ottoman subjects. A British diplomatic memorandum in 1928 estimated around 200,000 Persians in Iraq. The community was concentrated in southern Iraq, characterized by the Persian language and Shia Islam, and comprised around 1.5% to 2% of all Iraqis before the 1980s, and they outnumbered the Feyli Kurds, who were associated with Iran but counted separately. The Iraqi Persians were the most affected by deportations in the Ba'athist period alongside the Feyli Kurds. In the 20th century, Feyli Kurdish immigrants in Iraq, mostly coming from Ilam, generally felt no connection with ethnic Persians in Iraq aside from their shared ties to Iran.

The formation of the Iraqi state in 1921 changed the status of the Persian community. They had lost their privileges and could no longer easily immigrate to Iraq. The state also advocated Pan-Arabism which served to undermine the position of Persians, with the policies of the Iraqi government and with diminishing Persian influence in Iraq. The Iraqi Persians were affected by the Iraqi Nationality law of 1924, as well as a law introduced in 1927 prohibiting foreigners in the Iraqi government, and another law regulating the appointments of civil and religious judges in 1929, with only Iraqi citizens with good Arabic knowledge allowed to serve as judges in religious courts. In December 1935, the Iraqi parliament passed a law preventing foreign nationals from working certain trades, although it specifically applied to traditionally Persian-dominated trades in the holy cities. In the holy shrines, regulation 25 in 1948 and regulation 42 in 1950 also affected the community, with all servants of the shrines required to be Iraqi citizens. The Persian population drastically decreased under the Iraqi monarchy, most noticeably in Karbala, where they comprised around 75 percent in the early 20th century but had decreased to around 12 percent by 1957. The Persians either accepted Iraqi nationality or left the country, especially as the Ba'athist government actively persecuted the community. Persians deported from Iraq to Iran by 1929 usually began settling in neighboring Khuzestan province.

The Persian schools in Iraq suffered financially during and after World War I. They were about to close when Reza Khan traveled to Iraq from Khuzestan in 1924, and was asked by the local Iranian community to turn these into public schools, after which he ordered the Iranian Ministry of Education to administer the schools and allocate them a monthly 100 tomans, plus 29,000 tomans for furniture and student uniforms, and an additional 80,000 tomans for any other expenses. Later, three more Persian schools were founded in Iraq, which were the Pahlavi school, an elementary school for boys founded in Basra in 1936, as well as the Shahrbanu school in Kadhimayn and Sorayya (changed to Farah in 1966) school in Baghdad, two elementary schools for girls both founded in 1957. Ahmad Amin directed the school system until 1940, followed by Sadegh Nash'at from 1940 to 1956. After the Ba'ath Party came to power, and the mass deportations of Iranians afterwards, enrollment in Persian schools considerably dropped as they were harassed by Iraqi security forces.

Iraqi Sunni Arabs historically held a deep animosity towards Iraqi Persians, seen as a challenge to Arab nationalism, and during the establishment of the Iraqi monarchy, many Sunni Arabs close to the monarchy advocated against the Iraqi Persians, accusing them of harboring hatred for Arabs for centuries and being disloyal to the Arab state. Abd al-Salam Arif alienated Iranian immigrants in favor of Egyptian ones, and some Iranians left as the Egyptians arrived. Some Iranian Arabs from Khuzestan felt as if the Anti-Iranian stance of Iraq had even affected them. Abd al-Rahman Arif attempted to secure the border. In 1966, the Pahlavi government intervened and offered land grants and financial assistance to those who returned to Iran. However, the Iranians deported from Iraq during the later Ba'athist era did not receive similar support, likely due to their large quantity. Saddam Hussein continued the effort to clear southern Iraq from the Persian population. Similarly to how Iraq rejected Iranian immigrants and accused them of being spies, the government of Mohammad Reza Pahlavi was also reluctant to accept deported Iranians, suspecting there was saboteurs and spies among them. Iraqis of Iranian origin felt rejected by both states. Many of those deported only spoke Arabic and had little or no connection with Iran, even if it was their country of origin. Ethnic Persians who settled in Arab or Kurdish towns in Iraq usually adopted the local language.

In 1978, Ba'athist Iraqi intelligence reported that Kurdish political refugees in Iran received support from the local Kurds there, and the Pahlavi government had only accepted their presence in Iran because they were accepted by the Kurds there. The Iraqi government attempted to convince Iranian Arabs in Khuzestan that they belonged in Iraq, while at the same time deporting Iraqis of Iranian origin. The Iraqi government used the term "Iranian citizens" and usually avoided ethnic terms, although it was specifically referring to ethnic Persians. Iranian Armenians and Iranian Arabs living in Iraq were officially exempted from deportation, as were certain Iranian political dissidents. The Ba'athist government also distinguished between Shia Arabs and "Persians", and claimed that Shia and Sunni Muslims were united in Iraq and that the Shia Imams were Arab, while the Persians were usurpers. During the Ba'athist period, Iraqi Persians were exposed to derogatory insults such as "Ajam" and "Majus". While the label for Iranians in Iraq was generally associated with ethnic Persians, it sometimes included others who had a connection to Iran, such as Arabs, Kurds, Assyrians, Turks, and Jews.

Several Iraqi Kurds and Iraqi Persians were arrested for collaborating with SAVAK during the 1974-1975 Iraqi–Kurdish War and the 1974–1975 Shatt al-Arab conflict. In January 1974, the Iraqi Ba'ath Party claimed that Persian immigration not only to Iraq, but also to Arab states of the Persian Gulf (where there were large Persian communities in Kuwait, Bahrain, Qatar, and the UAE), was a colonial threat comparable to the Israeli occupation of Palestine. Kuwaiti Persians also suffered extensively during the Iraqi invasion of Kuwait. With the start of the Iran–Iraq War, Iraq drove ethnic Persians to the border. Around 60,000 Iraqi Persians were deported to Iran in 1974. Further deportations took place during the Iran–Iraq War. The introduction of Law 666 in May 1980 enabled the government to abrogate the Iraqi citizenship of every citizen of a foreign origin who was declared to be disloyal to the state. It was estimated that the Ba'athist government deported around 650,000 Iraqis of Iranian origin in total. Other estimates suggested that Saddam Hussein deported as many as 800,000 Iranians and Iraqis of Iranian origin, overshadowing the deportations of previous rulers. Even those who had been well-integrated in Iraq for generations had been deported. In Iran, the term "Mu'āvidīn" was applied to Iraqi Persians who were either deported or returned to Iran, and it literally meant "returnees". The Mu'avidin made up a large part of the Iranian government after the 1979 revolution.

== Notable people ==
- Mohammed Ajam, musician
- Abu Mahdi al-Muhandis, militia leader
- Feisal al-Istrabadi, lawyer and diplomat
- Mohsen Araki, cleric and politician
- Kamel al-Gilani, politician
- Mohammad-Ali Taskhiri, cleric
- Jawad Salehi, university professor
- Ali Akbar Salehi, politician
- Mohammad Reza Naqdi, military commander
- Hamid-Reza Assefi, politician

== See also ==
- Iran–Iraq relations
- Iranian diaspora
- Iraqis in Iran
- Moaved
