= Muhammad Ali Mazidi =

Iranian electrical engineer and lecturer

Muhammad Ali Mazidi (May 10, 1954 – August 30, 2022) was an Iranian-born electrical engineer, author, and lecturer based in Texas. He was the co-author of The 80x86 IBM PC and Compatible Computers, a widely used textbook published by Prentice Hall, as well as the widely cited author of several editions of The 8051 Microcontroller and Embedded Systems.

Mazidi went to Tabriz University and held master's degrees from both Southern Methodist University and the University of Texas at Dallas. He founded MicroDigitalEd and taught microprocessor-based system design. He was also a scholar of and occasional lecturer on the Baháʼí Faith.

== Works ==
He had authored/co-authored several books, available from Prentice Hall and Amazon Kindle:

- 80X86 IBM PC and Compatible Computers: Assembly Language, Design, and Interfacing Volumes I & II, Prentice Hall (ISBN 0-13-061775-X)
- x86 PC: Assembly Language, Design, and Interfacing, Prentice Hall (ISBN 0-13-502648-2)
- 8051 Microcontroller and Embedded Systems, Prentice Hall (ISBN 0-13-119402-X)
- PIC Microcontroller and Embedded Systems, Prentice Hall (ISBN 0-13-119404-6)
- HCS12 Microcontroller and Embedded Systems, Prentice Hall (ISBN 0-13-607229-1)
- AVR Microcontroller and Embedded Systems, Prentice Hall (ISBN 0-13-800331-9)
- ARM Assembly Language Programming & Architecture, Amazon Kindle
- TI ARM Peripherals Programming and Interfacing, Amazon Kindle
- Freescale ARM Cortex-M Embedded Programming, Amazon Kindle
