= Jawad Blunt =

Pakistani freestyle football champion and world-ranked player

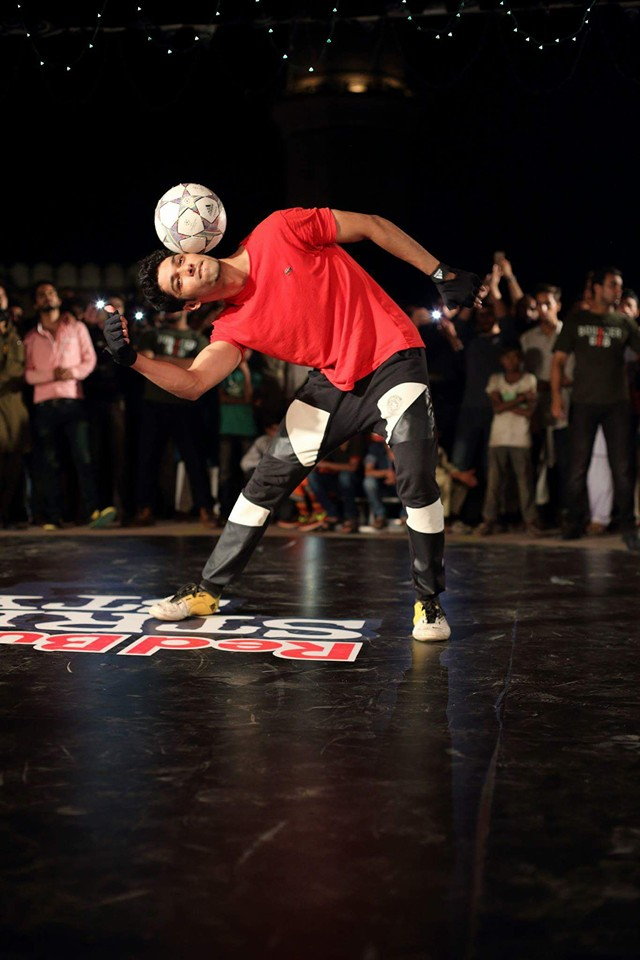
- Jawad Blunt during battle

Personal information
- Born: 15 April 1995 (age 31)
- Height: 1.83 m (6 ft 0 in)

Sport
- Country: Pakistan
- Sport: Freestyle Football
- Position: 1st

Achievements and titles
- Highest world ranking: No. 37 (1st January 2017)
Medal record
Representing Pakistan
Bronze medal – third place	Red Bull Street Style 2012 Pakistan
Gold medal – first place	Pakistan Freestyle Football Championship 2015
Gold medal – first place	Red Bull Street Style 2016 Pakistan
- Updated on 10 January 2017

Muhammad Jawad Aftab (born 15 April 1995) commonly known as Jawad Blunt is a two time freestyle football champion from Pakistan. He started his career as a professional football freestyler in 2012 and won his first national title in Pakistan Football Freestyle Championship. On September 8, 2016 Jawad was crowned Freestyle Football Champion by Red Bull Pakistan delegation at The Centaurus Mall Islamabad. He is currently ranked 37th in the world ranking of Freestyle Football Federation F3.

== Early life ==
Jawad was born in Mangla cantonment. His father Muhammad Amir Aftab was an officer in Pakistan military. From an early age Jawad remained interested in every kinds of sports and had been playing badminton and table tennis during his high school period representing his school Army public school mangla in regional championships. He remained undefeated high school champion of badminton for 3 years. According to Jawad his Parents always encouraged him to play every sport as a healthy activity. Jawad played non professional football for a very long time before getting inspired by a video Joga bonito in which the famous football star Ronaldinho Gaúcho performs freestyle football tricks and skills. It was then Jawad started learning Freestyle Football in late 2010.

== Career ==
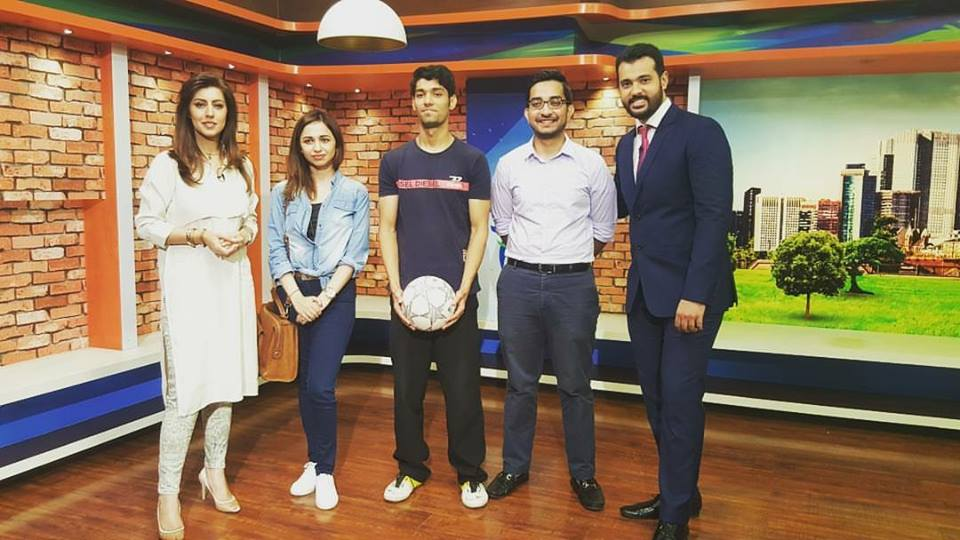
Jawad Blunt on Geo news

Jawad started learning freestyle football in 2010 and competed for the first time in 2012 red bull street style Pakistan however in his first competition he was knocked out in the semi-finals and stood 3rd. In 2015, he competed for the second time in Pakistan football Freestyle Championship and claimed the title of the National Champion. In 2016, he contested form lahore for the 3rd time and successfully defended his title making him the first person in the country to do so, on the final day of red bull street style 2016 Arsalan Iqbal was called on to challenge Jawad Blunt from Lahore. Both displayed great freestyling skills but Jawad Blunt stood out and won more points over Arsalan Iqbal. The final showdown was between Islamabad Sheheryar and Lahore Jawad Blunt. By this point the crowd had increased in large numbers and like the rest of the country eagerly awaited for Pakistan's next Red Bull Street Style Champion 2016. The final round started with Sheheryar displaying some outrageous freestyling skills and to counter his opponent, Jawad Blunt performed some unique freestyling skills in front of a large audience.

In the end, Jawad Blunt from Lahore was crowned Pakistan's Red Bull Street Style Champion 2016 after a unanimous decision by the judges which the narrator described as a "clear victory for Jawad". He is currently also working as a director for Pakistan Freestyle Football Federation (PF3). Jawad Blunt has made appearances on various TV channels such as Geo TV Express News representing Pakistan Freestyle Football Federation and also has been seen at corporate events such as Leisure Leagues launch etc.

== Personal life ==
Jawad belongs to Rajput clan. He calls himself "blunt", and there is logic behind it and Jawad himself explained it during an interview: "Blunt means dull. I call myself blunt because it will give me room for more improvement. I am not satisfied with what I am doing and it will provoke me to work more and so it will help me in my career and life." He trains 6 to 8 hours a day and follows a strict diet of 6 meals a day with 3,000 calories and 200 grams of protein everyday which keeps him in shape. In an interview he stated that training for red bull street style 2016 gave him the toughest time because twenty days before the main event he broke his hand while training and only ten days before the finals his mother died. Still defying all odds Jawad managed to secure his victory.
