= Xhevat Kelmendi =

- Born: 11 January 1955 (age 70)
- Origin: Peja, FPR Yugoslavia (now Kosovo)
- Genres: Waltz, Serenata Korcare, Kenge Arbereshe
- Occupation: Singer
- Instrument(s): Guitar, vocals
- Years active: 35

Xhevat Kelmendi (born January 1955) is an ethnic Albanian singer from Kosovo. Xhevat Kelmendi is from Peja and is one of the greatest 'serenata' (popular songs).
