= Javad Arianmanesh =

Iranian footballer

Personal information
- Date of birth: September 21, 1953 (age 73)
- Place of birth: Mashhad, Iran

Senior career*
Years	Team	Apps	(Gls)
- Payam Mashhad
- * Club domestic league appearances and goals

Javad Arianmanesh (Persian: جواد آرین‌منش; born September 21, 1953) is an Iranian retired football player. He is an MP in Iranian Parliament representing Mashhad and Kalat.

== Football career ==
Arianmanesh played for Payam Mashhad during the 1970s and 1980s. He was captain of the team for many years. After retirement, he also held various positions such as member of the executive committee of F.C. Aboomoslem and also head of Khorasan Province Football Association.
