= Javad Mokhbery =

American businessman (born 1952)

- Born: 1952 (age 73–74); Iran
- Education: Lawrence Technological University
- Known for: Founding FUTEK
- Spouse: Zohreh Mokhbery

Javad Mokhbery (born 1952) is an American businessman and philanthropist. He is the founder and chief executive officer (CEO) of Futek.

== Early life and education ==
Mokhbery was born in 1952 in Iran and moved to England at the age of 19 to receive his early education. Later, 1974, he moved to Detroit, U.S. and attended Lawrence Technological University, where he graduated with a bachelor's degree in mechanical engineering in 1979.

== Career ==
After finishing his studies, he worked in Detroit and California for different sensor companies, contributing to projects such as the Discovery space shuttle. In 1985, he established Futek, initially focusing on cryogenic sensors for the Discovery space shuttle mission. Futek later created sensors for NASA's Curiosity rover, designed to function in the planet's low temperatures. These sensors monitored the rover's drilling arm, drilling force, and precision on the Mars surface. The rover landed in August 2012, and his company continues to collaborate with NASA on various projects, including the next-generation Mars rover's robotic arm, parachute sensors, and load cells for the International Space Station.

In September 2022, Mokhbery was honored in the LTU School of Engineering Hall of Fame. In November 2022, he participated as a candidate in the Laguna Niguel City Council election. Mokhbery supports the Saddleback College Foundation, Irvine Public Scholl Foundation, and Families Forward. In 2020, Lawrence Technological University established the Advanced Cybersecurity Computer Lab, made possible by a gift from Mokhbery.

== Bibliography ==
- How Sensors and Load Cells Make Machines Smarter (2007)
