= Jawad Ahannach =

Dutch footballer (born 1978)

Personal information
- Full name: Jawad Akeel Ahannach
- Date of birth: August 4, 1978 (age 48)
- Place of birth: Harderwijk, Netherlands
- Height: 1.77 m (5 ft 9 1/2 in)
- Positions: Midfielder; defender

Youth career
- 1986–1987: DCG Amsterdam
- 1987–1990: KBV Amsterdam
- 1990–1991: Ajax
- 1991–1997: FC Volendam

Senior career*
Years	Team	Apps	(Gls)
1997–2000	Admira Wacker		
2000	Leyton Orient		
2000–2001	União		
2001–2002	SV Oberwart		
2003–2019	Umm Salal	200	(4)
2012–2013	→ Al-Gharafa (loan)	21	(0)
- * Club domestic league appearances and goals

Jawad Akeel Ahannach (Arabic: جواد عقيل أحناش; born August 4, 1978) is a Dutch retired football player.
