= Haji Javad Mosque =

Mosque in Baku, Azerbaijan

- Azerbaijani: Hacı Cavad məscidi
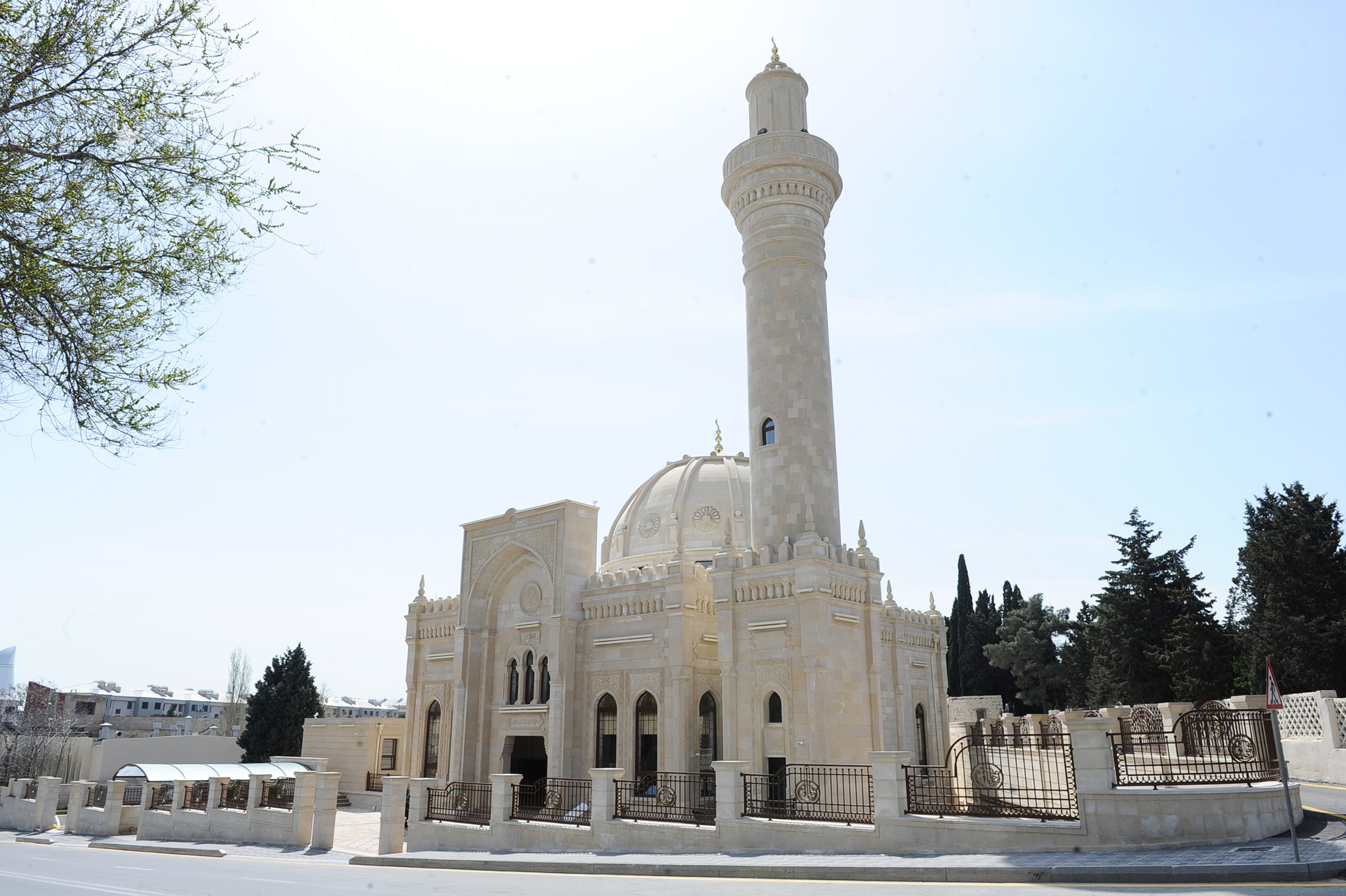
- The mosque, in 2018

- Location of the mosque in Baku

Religion
- Affiliation: Islam
- Ecclesiastical or organisational status: Mosque
- Status: Active; Demolished (first mosque)

Location
- Location: Abbas Mirza Sharifzade Street, Baku
- Country: Azerbaijan
- Coordinates: 40°22′9″N 49°49′33″E

Architecture
- Type: Mosque architecture
- Completed: 1305 AH (1887/1888 CE) (first mosque); 2018 (current mosque)
- Demolished: 1 July 2017 (first mosque)

Specifications
- Capacity: 500 worshippers
- Interior area: 400 m^{2} (4,300 sq ft)
- Dome: One
- Minaret: One
- Minaret height: 33.7 m (111 ft)
- Site area: 1,200 m^{2} (13,000 sq ft)

The Haji Javad Mosque (Azerbaijani: Hacı Cavad Məscidi) is a mosque located in the Yasamal District of Baku, the capital of Azerbaijan.

== History ==
=== First mosque ===
The first mosque was built in 1305 AH (1887/1888 CE), located at located in 79 Abdulla Shaig Street. The building had three inscriptions which confirmed the year of construction. The initiator of mosque building was the merchant Haji Javad. The internal area was 12 m (39 ft) wide by 18 m (59 ft) long, with a height of 6 m (20 ft) from the floor to the ceiling and 9 m (30 ft) from the floor to the dome. The building also had a place for a school madrasa.

During the Soviet era, the mosque building was converted into a kindergarten and living areas. After the USSR, the collapsed mosque was repaired and opened for believers.

In April 2017, news of the announcement that the mosque would be demolished caused unrest among local Muslims and sparked protests. The demolition, planned for April, was suspended. Following investigations, the mosque was demolished on the night of 1 July 2017.

=== Current mosque ===
The construction of a new mosque, per a presidential decree, located on Abbas Mirza Sharifzade Street, started the following day and was completed on 12 April 2018. The total area of the new mosque is 1,200 m^{2} (13,000 sq ft), of which 400 m^{2} (4,300 sq ft) is for the prayer hall. The height of the building was increased to 18 m (59 ft) and the minaret is 33.7 m (111 ft) tall. Walls are decorated with ornaments and verses from the Quran.

== See also ==
- Islam in Azerbaijan
- List of mosques in Azerbaijan
- List of mosques in Baku
