= Javad Karimi Sabet =

Iranian politician

- جواد کریمی‌ثابت
- Born: 25 July 1973 (age 52); Qom, Iran
- Citizenship: Iran
- Education: Ph.D
- Employer: Iranian Nuclear Society

Javad Karimi Sabet (Persian: جواد کریمی ثابت; born 25 July 1973) is an Iranian academic, researcher and nuclear scientist.

He obtained his Ph.D. in Chemical Engineering from the Sharif University

He has been working in the Atomic Energy Organization of Iran since 1999. His research focuses on the development of new technologies for stable isotope separation, application development of stables isotopes, Multi-Scale modeling and simulation of processes related to nuclear fuel cycle.

Karimi-Sabet has published more than 80 journal articles and 90 conference papers which cover fields including stable isotopes separation, supercritical fluid, membrane separation, microfluidics and process modeling and he has authored and translated 6 books in the areas.

Karimi-Sabet is the deputy of the AEOI, the head of the National Center for Atomic Standards of Iran and the head of the Iranian Nuclear Society.

== Awards ==
- The National Research Award, Third-Degree, from the President of the Islamic Republic of Iran (2006)
- Exemplary Director in the Atomic Energy Organization of Iran in the 5th National Conference on Exemplary Management (2018)
- Badge of knowledge, Ethics and Effort from the head of the Atomic Energy Organization of Iran (2018)
