= Mohammed Abdel-Jawad =

Palestinian footballer

Personal information
- Full name: Mohammed Abdel-Jawad
- Date of birth: May 22, 1979 (age 47)
- Place of birth: Palestine
- Position: Central defender

Senior career*
Years	Team	Apps	(Gls)
2006–2010	Al-Bireh		
2010–2011	Hilal Al-Quds		
2011–2012	Shabab Al-Khalil		

International career
2008–	Palestine	2	(0)
- * Club domestic league appearances and goals

Mohammed Abdel-Jawad (born May 1, 1979) is a Palestinian footballer who plays as a central defender for Palestine football club Al-Birah. In 1994, he served as the team's captain.
