= Javad Ghenaat =

Iranian politician (born 1966)

Mohammad Javad Ghenaat

Governor-general of South Khorasan
- In office 24 November 2021 – 20 November 2024
- President: Ebrahim Raisi
- Preceded by: Hamid Mollanouri Shamsi
- Succeeded by: Mohammad-Reza Hashemi

Governor-general of Golestan
- In office 15 November 2009 – 6 October 2013
- President: Mahmoud Ahmadinejad
- Preceded by: Yahya Mahmoudzadeh
- Succeeded by: Hassan Sadeghlu

Personal details
- Born: 1966 (age 59–60) Amol Mazandaran province, Iran
- Party: Principlist
- Education: Mazandaran University.

Mohammad Javad Ghenaat (Persian: محمدجواد قناعت, born 1966) is an Iranian conservative politician who formerly served as the governor general of South Khorasan Province from 2021 to 2024.

== Early life and education ==
Ghenaat was born in Amol in the Mazandaran province in 1966. He holds bachelor's degree in Pure Chemistry and received a PhD in Organic Chemistry from Mazandaran University.
