= Moaved =

Ethnic Persians who were deported from Iraq

Iraqi Moaveds (Persian: معاودین عراقی) are a group of 350,000–650,000 Iraqi citizens of Persian descent who were deported from Iraq by the Ba'athist regime because of their Iranian ancestry. Hundreds of thousands of Shia Iraqis of Iranian ancestry whose families had resided in Iraq for many generations were expelled from Iraq in the early 1970s and in 1980 before the Iran–Iraq War. The exact number of deportations is not clear and ranges from 350,000 to 650,000. Most of them could prove Iranian ancestry in the court received Iranian citizenship (400,000) and some of them returned to Iraq after Saddam's fall.

Many Iraqi Moaveds hold or have held high positions in the government of the Islamic Republic of Iran such as Shahroudi (head of Judicial system of Iran), General Mohammad Reza Naqdi (commander of the Basij paramilitary force), Hamid-Reza Assefi and Ali Akbar Salehi (Minister of Foreign Affairs).

== See also ==
- Iranians in Iraq
- Iraqis in Iran
- 'Ajam of Kuwait
