= Jawad Salehi =

Iranian engineer

Jawad A. Salehi
- جواد صالحی
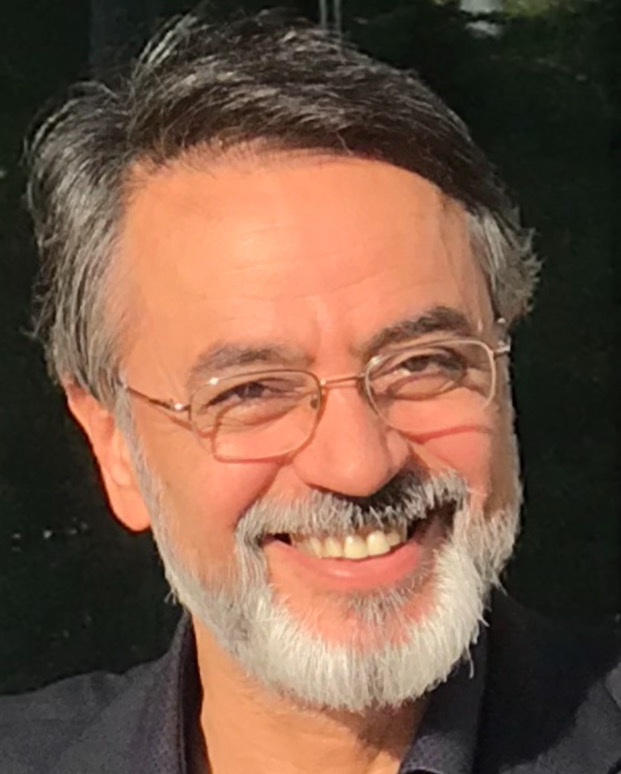
- Jawad A. Salehi, Department of Electrical Engineering and Sharif Quantum Center, Sharif University of Technology.
- Born: December 22, 1956 (age 69); Kadhimiya, Iraq
- Citizenship: Iranian
- Education: University of California, Irvine; University of Southern California
- Awards: IEEE Fellow; Optica Fellow; Member of Academy of Sciences of Iran; Fellow of Islamic World Academy of Sciences
- Scientific career
- Workplaces: Sharif University of Technology
- Thesis: Spread Spectrum Multiple Access Systems Performance Analysis (1984)
- Website: http://sharif.edu/~jasalehi

Jawad A. Salehi, IEEE Fellow & Optica Fellow, (Persian: جواد صالحی) born in Kazemain (Kadhimiya), Iraq, on December 22, 1956, is an Iranian electrical and computer engineer, pioneer of optical code division multiple access (CDMA) and named Highly Cited Researcher. He is also a board member of Academy of Sciences of Iran and a fellow of Islamic World Academy of Sciences. He was also elected as a member of Iranian Science and Culture Hall of Fame (چهره‌های ماندگار) in Electrical Engineering, October 2010.

== Education ==
Dr. Salehi received the B.Sc. degree in electrical engineering from the University of California, Irvine, in 1979, and the M.Sc. and Ph.D. degrees, all in electrical engineering, from the University of Southern California (USC), Los Angeles, in 1980 and 1984, respectively.

== Affiliations ==
From 1981 to 1984, he was a full-time Research Assistant at Communication Science Institute at USC, where he was engaged in research in the area of spread spectrum systems. On 1984 he joined Bell Communications Research (Bellcore), Morristown, New Jersey as a Member of Technical Staff of the Applied Research Area. Meanwhile, from February to May 1990, he was with the Laboratory of Information and Decision Systems, Massachusetts Institute of Technology (MIT), Cambridge, as a visiting research scientist conducting research on optical multiple-access networks. He left Bellcore (Now Telcordia) on 1993.

Later on 1997, Salehi joined Sharif University of Technology, Tehran, Iran, as a faculty member and was an associate professor and since 2003 he has become a full professor with the department of electrical engineering (EE), Sharif University of Technology (SUT). From 1999 to 2001, he was the Head of Mobile Communications Systems Group and co-director of Advanced and Wideband Code Division Multiple Access (CDMA) Laboratory at Iran Telecom Research Center (ITRC), Tehran, conducting research in the area of advance CDMA techniques for optical and radio communications systems.

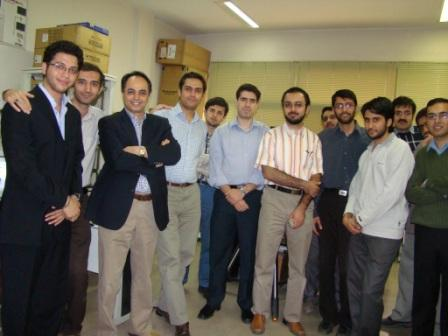
Dr Jawad Salehi at his Lab

In 2003, he founded and directed the Optical Networks Research Laboratory (ONRL), Electrical Engineering Department, SUT, for advanced theoretical and experimental research in futuristic fiber-optic communication and all-[optical networking]. He is also a Cofounder of Advanced Communications Research Institute (ACRI) at SUT for advancing the graduate school research program in communications science.

== Research ==
Professor Salehi's current research interests include quantum Internet, quantum communication signals and systems, and quantum multiple access systems and networks. He is also interested in fiber-optic communications and optical multiaccess networks, in particular, optical orthogonal codes (OOC); fiber-optic CDMA; femtosecond or ultra-short light pulse CDMA; spread time CDMA; holographic CDMA; wireless indoor optical CDMA; all-optical synchronization; and applications of erbium-doped fiber amplifiers (EDFAs) in optical systems. He is father of OOC code generation and he is also given OCDMA concept.

== Recognitions, honors and awards ==
- Salehi is the holder of 12 U.S. patents on optical CDMA.
- Introduced as among the most influential researchers, ISI highly cited researcher, by Institute for Scientific Information Web of Knowledge in computer science category.
- The recipient of the first rank in fundamental research of Khwarizmi International Award and the recipient of World Intellectual Property Organization (WIPO) award for outstanding inventor, 2007.
- Recipient of the Bellcore's Award of Excellence
- The Outstanding Research Award of EE Department of Sharif University Technology in 2002, 2003, and 2006.
- the Nationwide Outstanding Research Award from the Ministry of Higher Education 2003, Iran and the Nation's Highly Cited Researcher Award 2004.
- Corecipient of IEEE's Best Paper Award ("spread-time/time-hopping ultrawideband (UWB) CDMA communications systems") from the International Symposium on Communications and Information Technology, October 2004, Japan.
- Since May 2001, he has been serving as Associate Editor for Optical communication category of the IEEE Transactions on Communications.
- In September 2005, he was elected as the interim Chair of the IEEE Iran section and he continued serving to 2007.
- Member of Technical Program Committee of Global Communications Conference (Globecom), 2006.
- Member of the organizing committee for the first and the second IEEE Conference on Neural Information.

== See also ==
- Science and technology in Iran
