= Majiayuan site =

Archaeological site in Gansu, China

Majiayuan
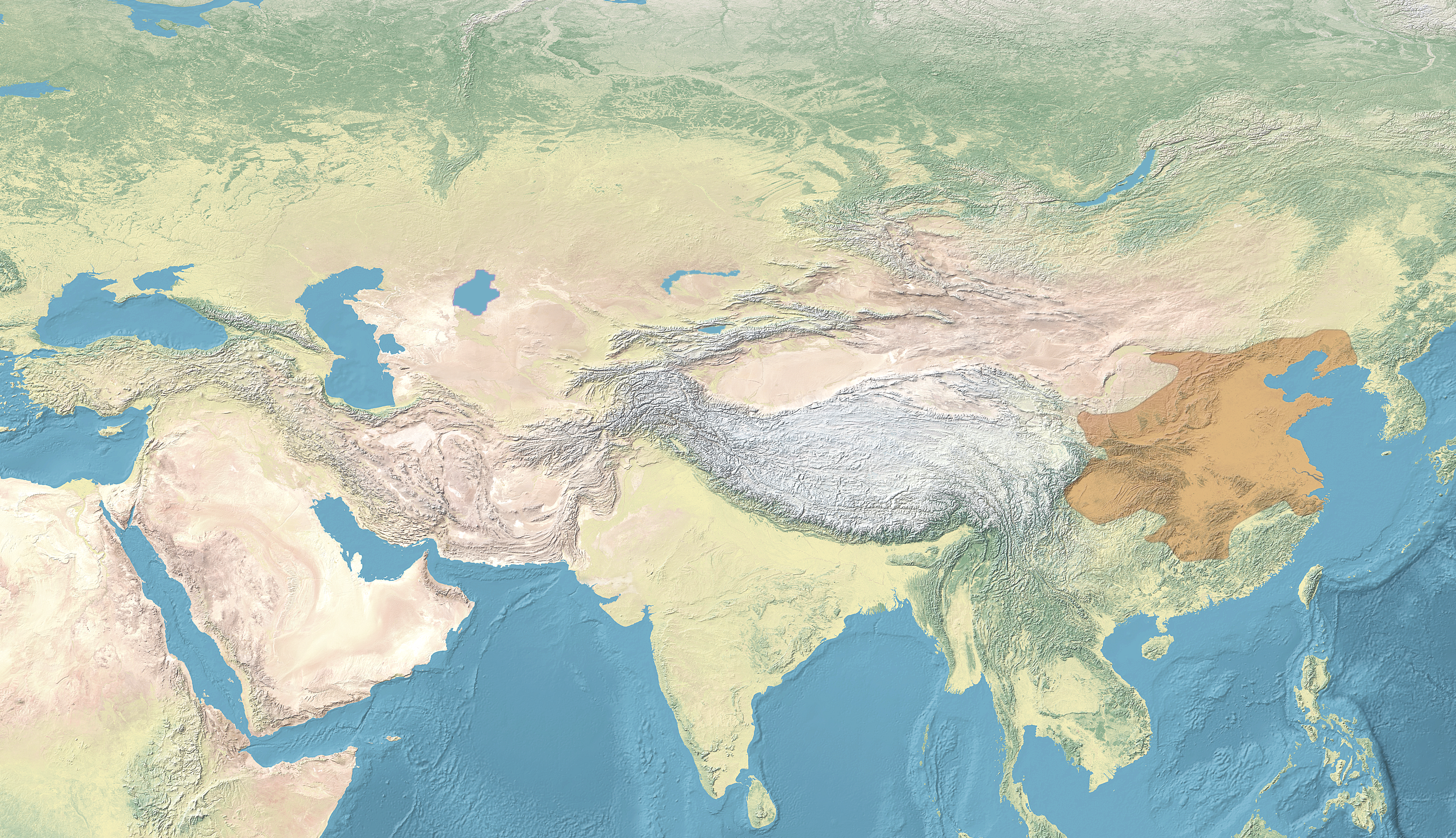
- Location of Majiayuan, with contemporary cultures in the 3rd century BCE
- Geographical range: Gansu
- Dates: 3rd century BCE
- Major sites: 35.046173°N 106.167438°E
- Preceded by: Shajing culture (800–200 BCE)
- Followed by: Han dynasty

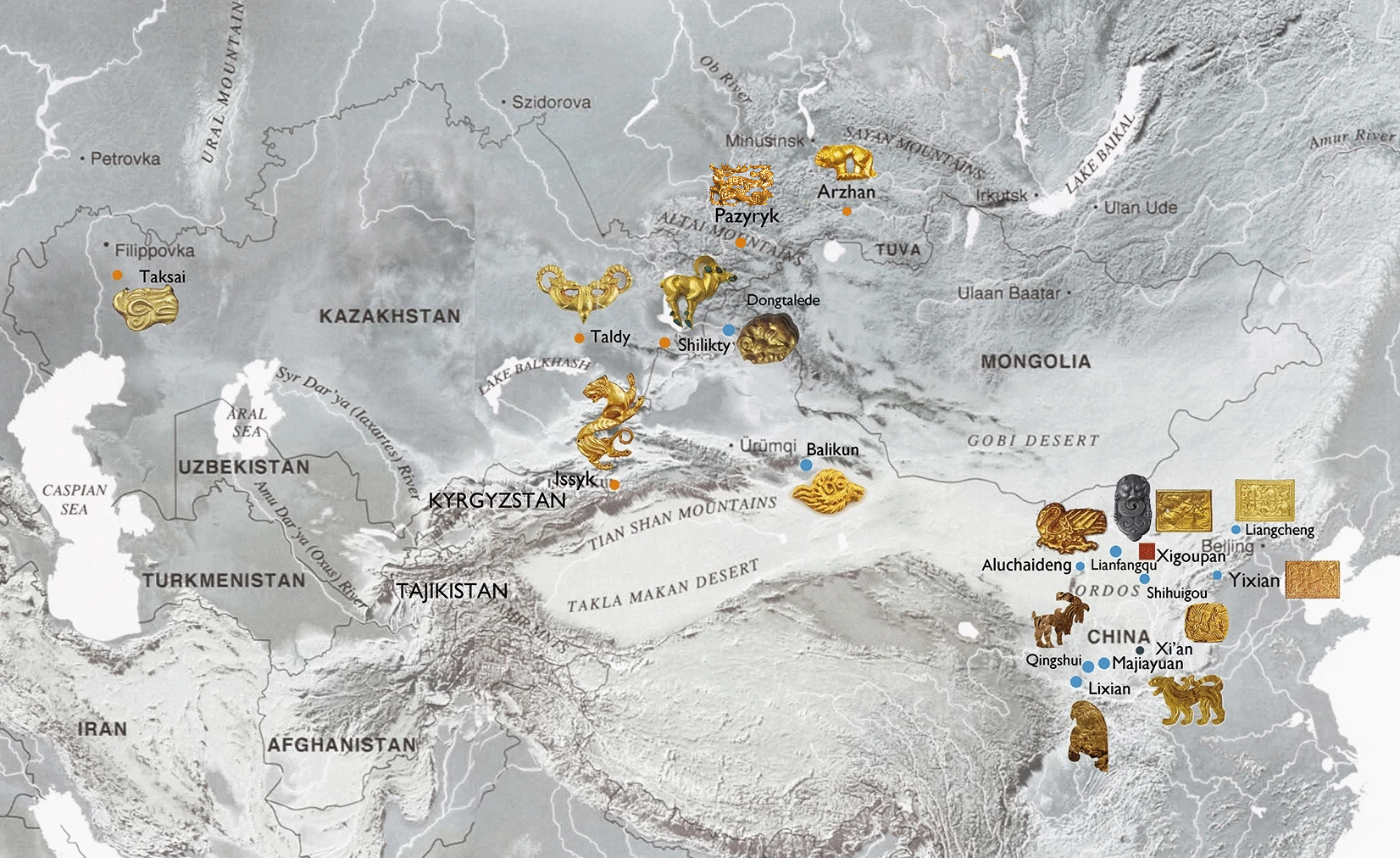
Geographical distribution of early gold and silver artefacts found in Northwest China and Central Asia, including Majiayuan (8th-3rd century BCE).

Majiayuan (Ch:马家塬遗址) is a 3rd-2nd century BCE archaeological site in Gansu, China. The site is considered as belonging to rulers of the culture of the Xirong ("Western Barbarians"), recently subjugated by the state of Qin, who included them within the defensive wall of King Zhao of Qin, built in 271 BCE. It is rather similar to another Xirong site about 50 km away, the Wangjiawa cemetery (王家洼墓地). Majiayuan was a zone of interaction between the Chinese and their nomadic neighbours to the west and north during the Warring States period (476–221 BCE).

== Characteristics ==
The pits are oriented west-east, with stepped passageways and a catacomb, but Majiayuan also has wooden coffins at the bottom of a vertical pit. Ornately decorated chariots have been found, as well as sacrificial animals, and the corpses were highly decorated with gold belt ornaments with bird patterns. In the tombs, tools and weapons were installed. There were li vessels with snake patterns and spade-shaped feet, and semi-circular necklaces.

About 30 horse chariots with diversified decoration were excavated at Majiayuan.

A special type of Barrel-shaped jug in bronze was excavated from the tomb of a Rong chief.

== Saka culture ==
The culture of Majiayuan, and the preceding Yanglang culture (杨郎青铜文化, 6th-3rd century BCE), are thought to have been directly or indirectly connected to the Saka (Scythian) culture, with suggestions of direct penetration of Saka groups into North China. The animal style of the funeral artifacts in particular connects it to the world of the steppes. In particular, the decorated chariots and many artifacts have strong resemblance with Saka objects from the Issyk-kul kurgan.

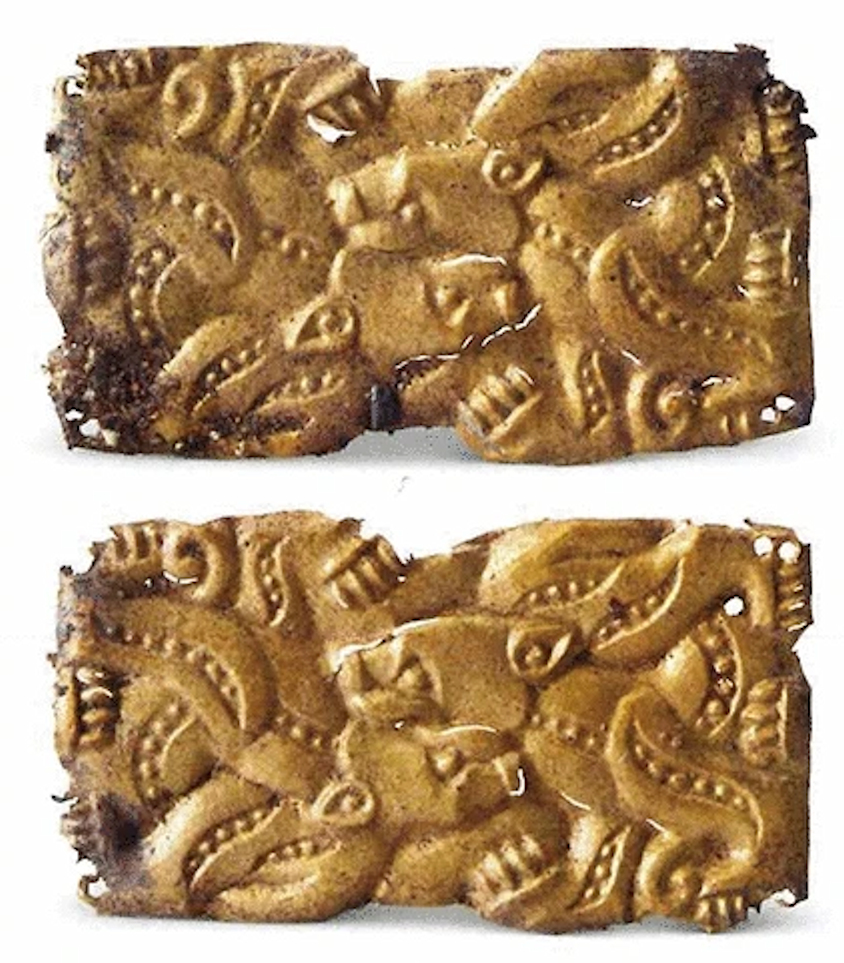
Gold belt plaques in animal style found in Majiayuan M4, Gansu.

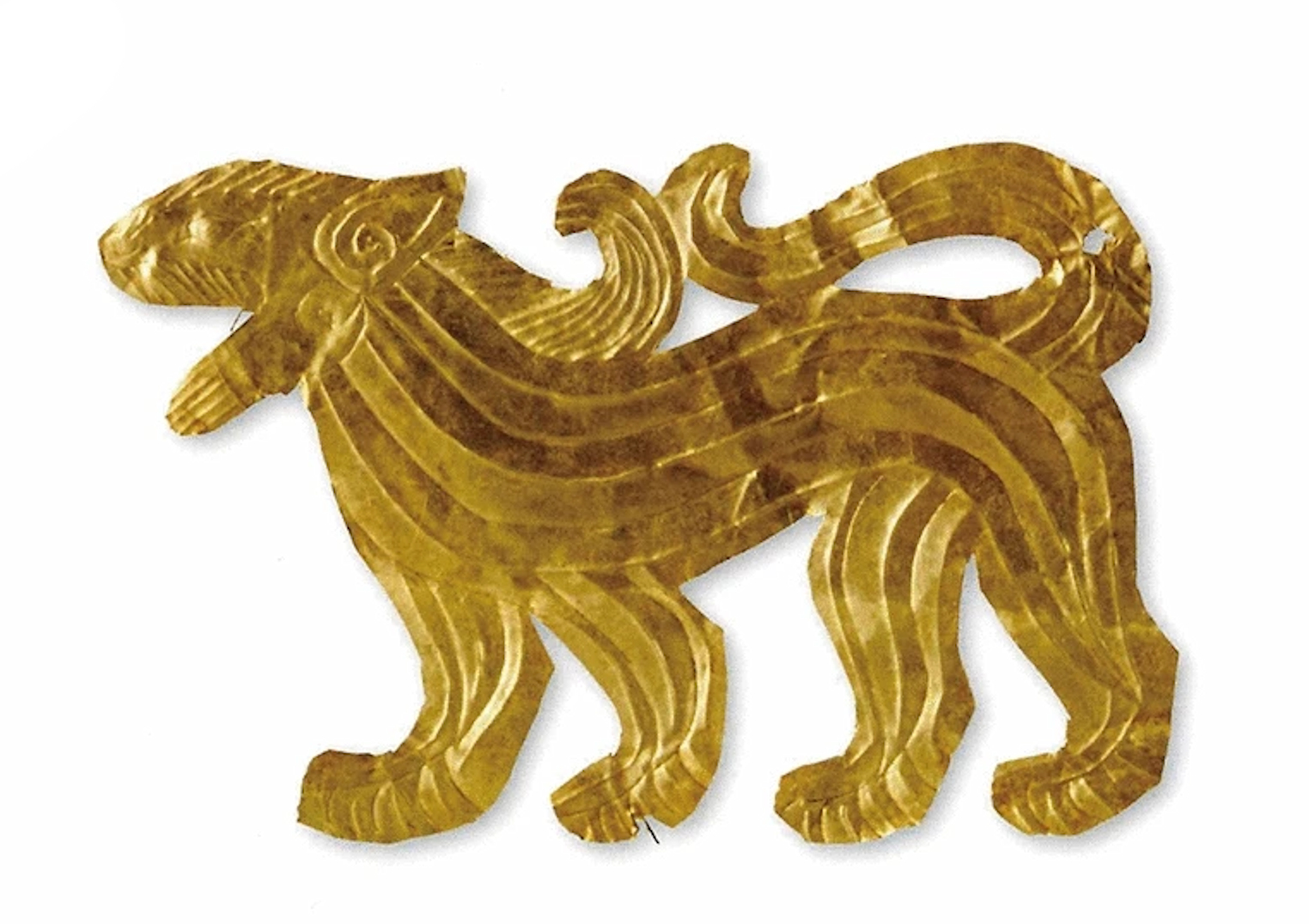
Gold plate in the form of walking feline found in Majiayuan M3, Gansu.

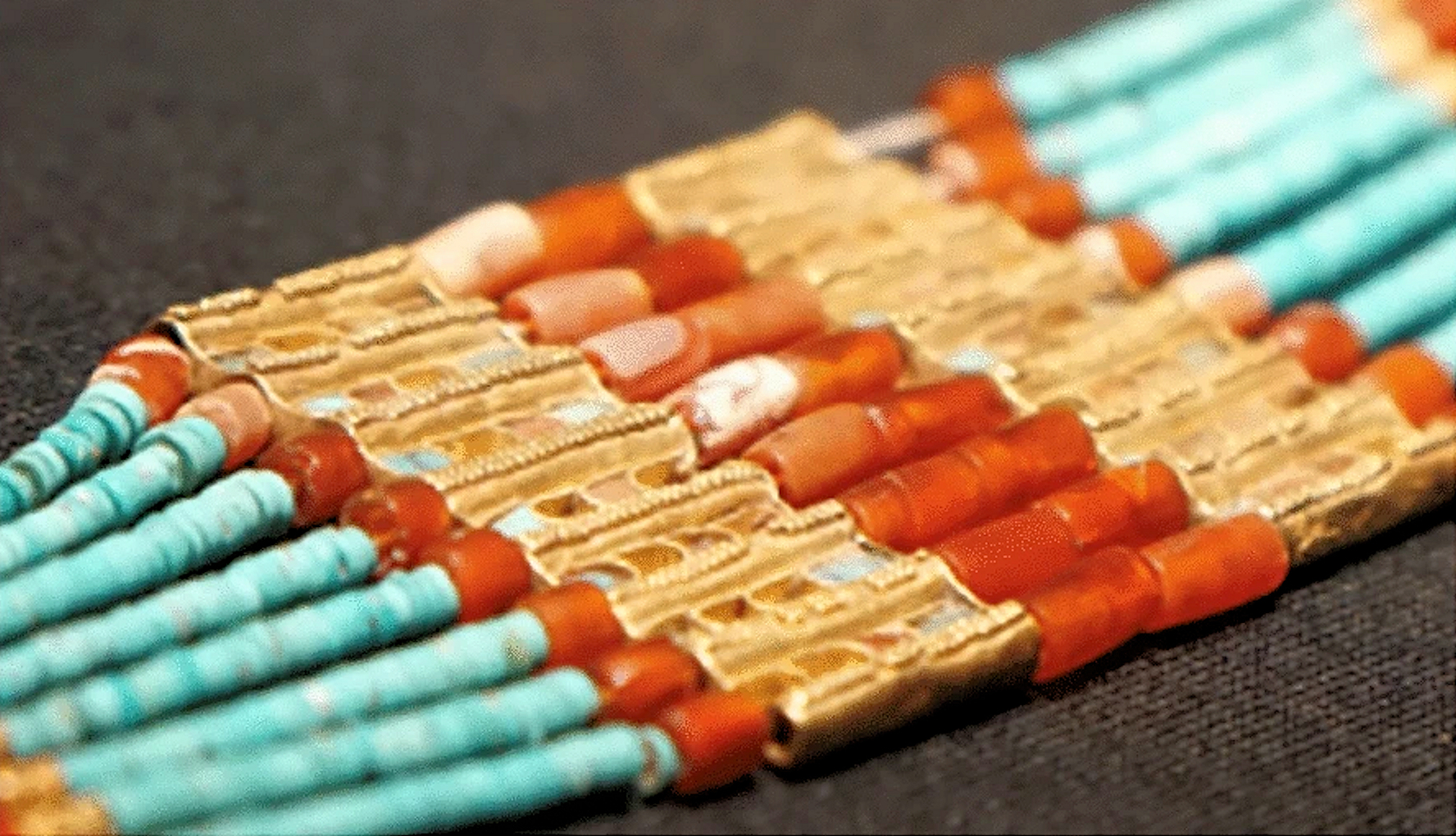
Necklace decorated with granulation, unearthed in Majiayuan, Gansu Provincial Institute of Cultural Relics and Archaeology.

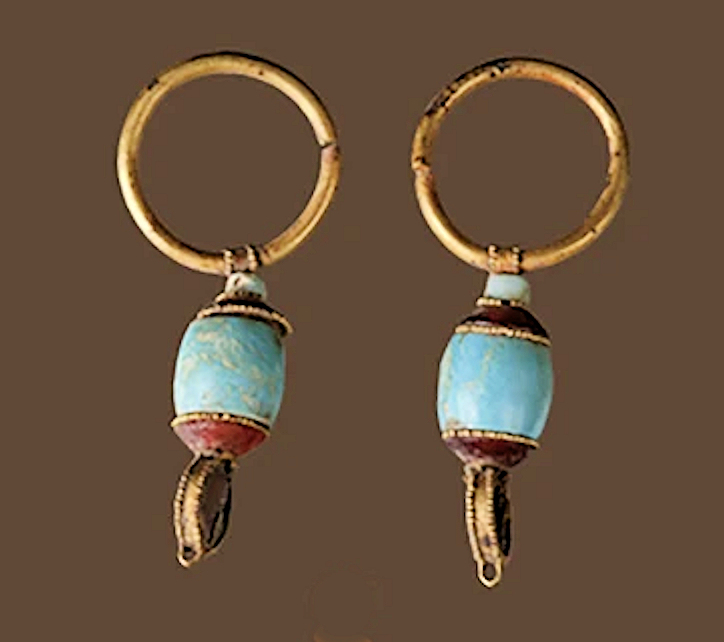
Earrings, Majiayuan cemetery in Gansu, the Warring states Period, Gansu Provincial Institute of Cultural Relics and Archaeology.

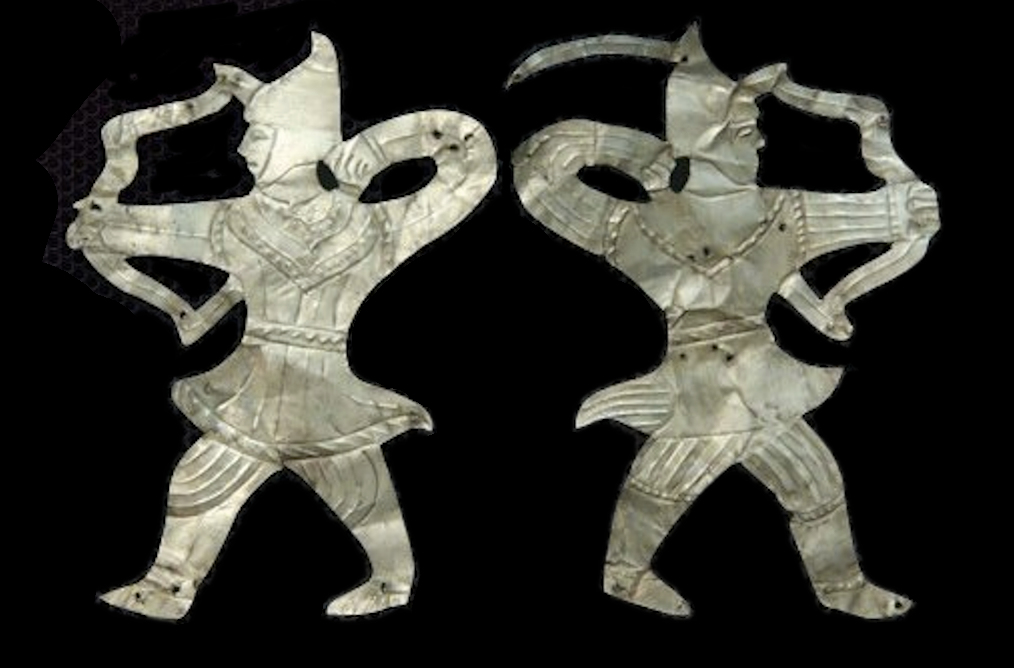
Majiayuan tomb figurines.

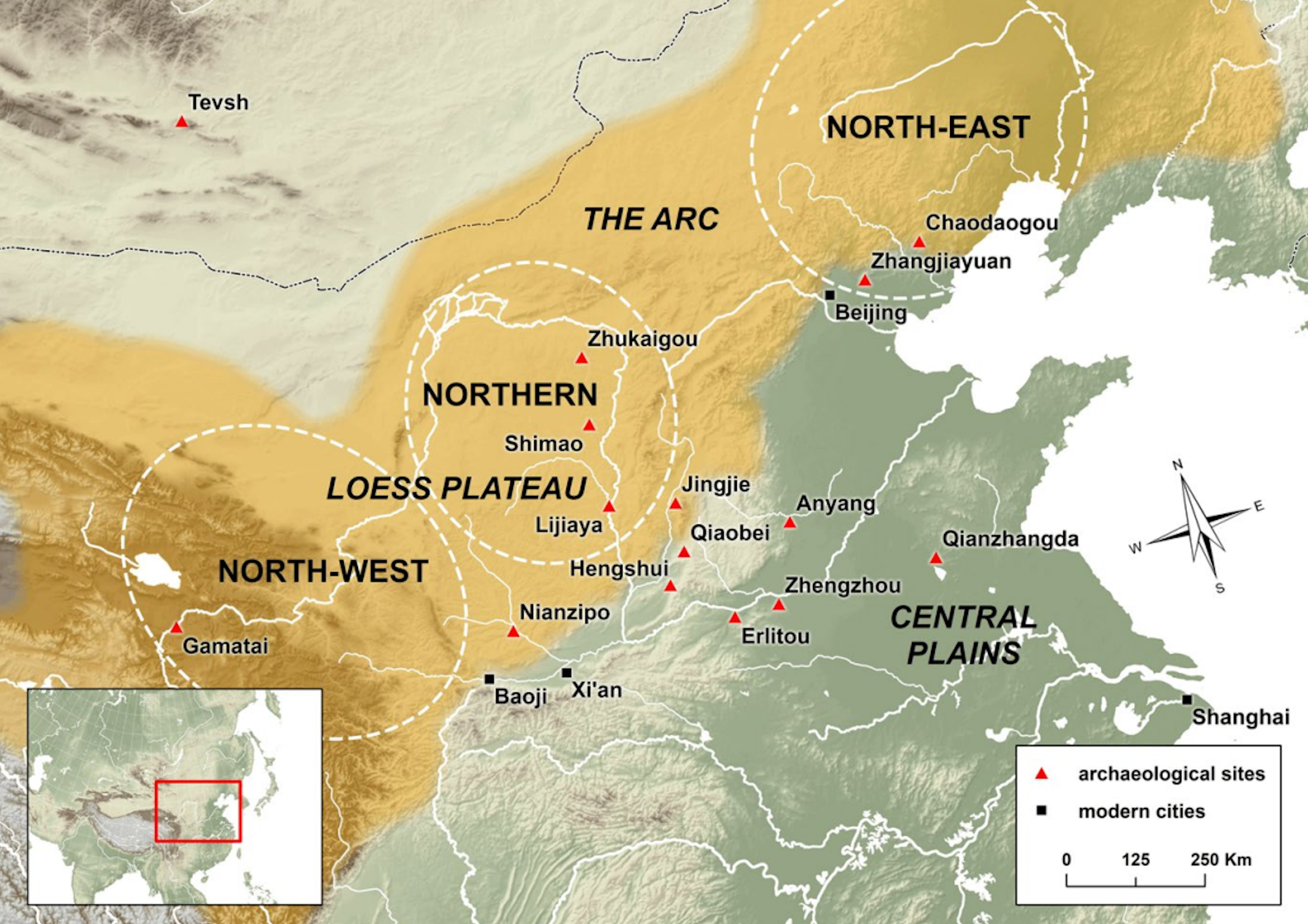
The Majiayuan culture was part of the "Arc of the eastern Steppe", next to the Central Plain of China.

== Works ==
- Collaborative Archaeological Team, of the Early Qin Culture and Zhangjiachuan County Museum (2011). "2007–2008 excavation on Majiayuan Cemetery of the WarringStates Period in Zhangjiachuan, Gansu" (PDF). Chinese Archaeology. 11.
- "北大考古与"百年百大考古发现"——甘肃张家川马家塬遗址-北京大学考古文博学院". archaeology.pku.edu.cn.
