= Cocoon jar =

Pottery from Cyprus

Cocoon jars or Cocoon-shaped jars are Chinese funerary pottery vessels, belonging to the period of the 1st millennium BCE. The shape is similar to the Cypriot Barrel-shaped jugs, as is generally the decoration, with vertical bands across the breadth of the vessels. The earliest type of cocoon-form jar in China dates to the Western Zhou period (99-771 BCE), either in ceramic or in bronze. The Qin dynasty period has many of them, particularly in relation with the Mausoleum of the First Emperor. It has been suggested that the Chinese obtained this design from nomadic people, especially the Rong and Di cultures, through the medium of the steppes of Central Asia.

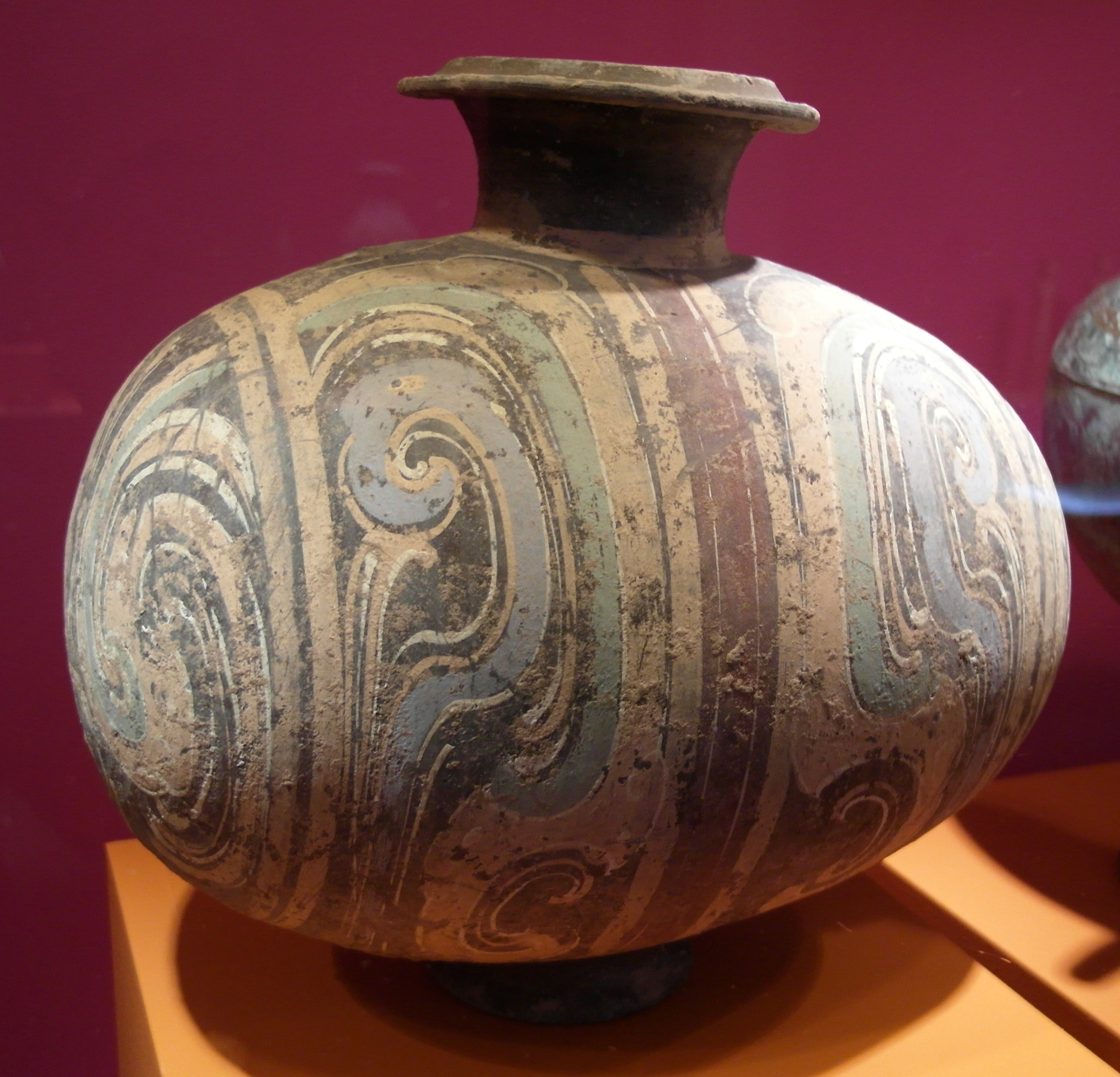
Western Han dynasty cocoon vessel (206 BCE-8 CE).

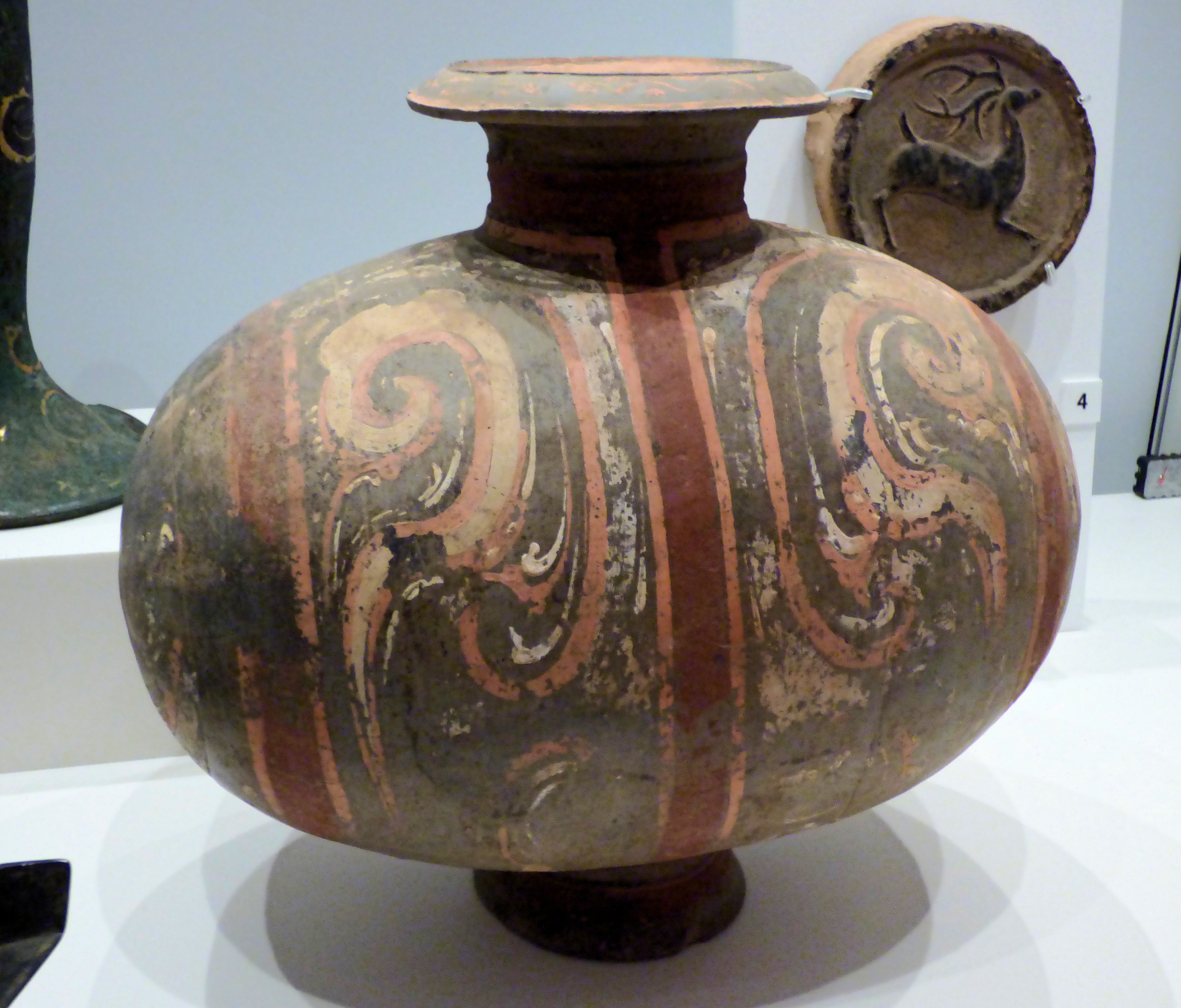
Cocoon vessel, Han dynasty

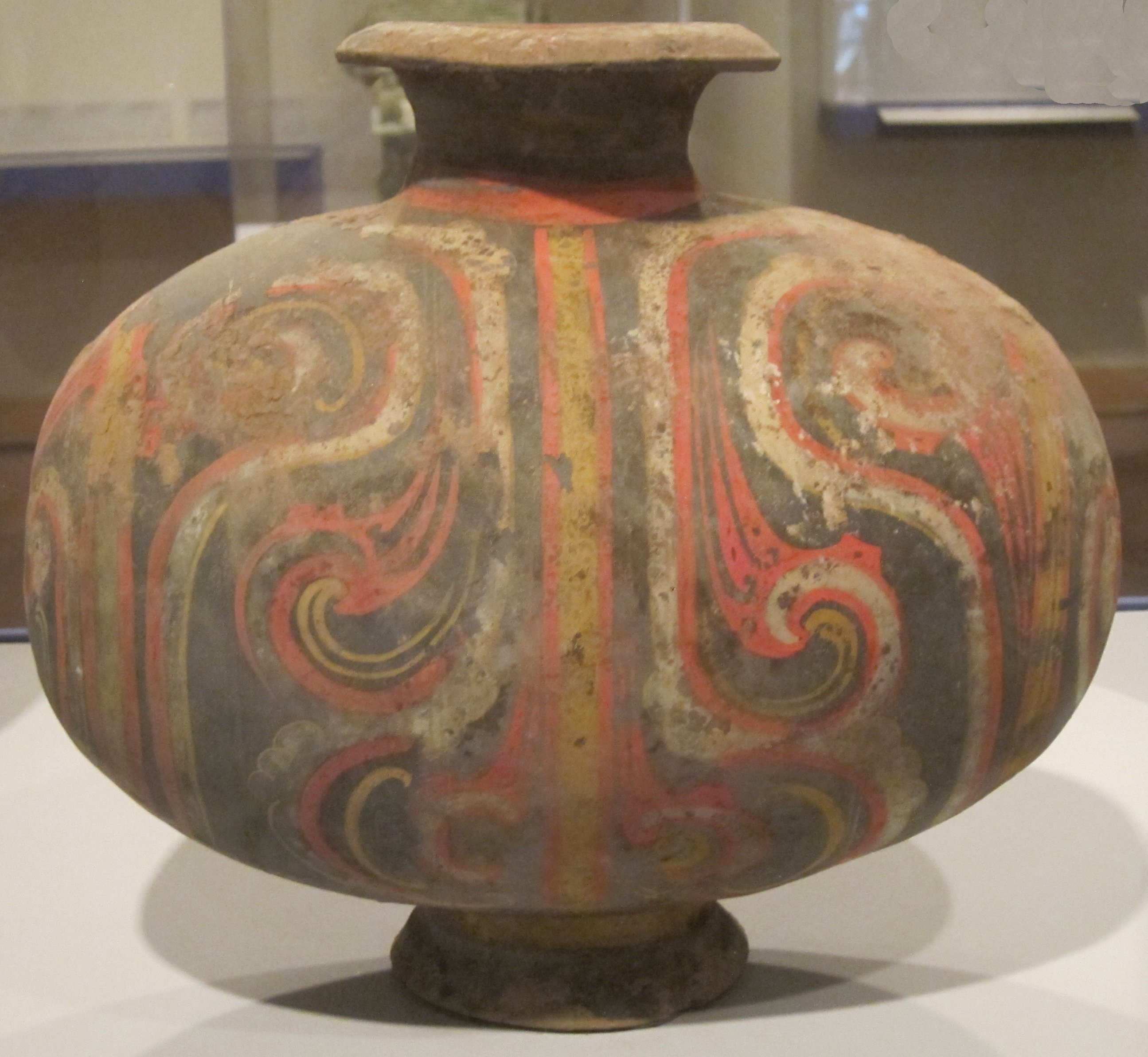
Cocoon-shaped vessel, Han dynasty (206 BCE–220 CE)

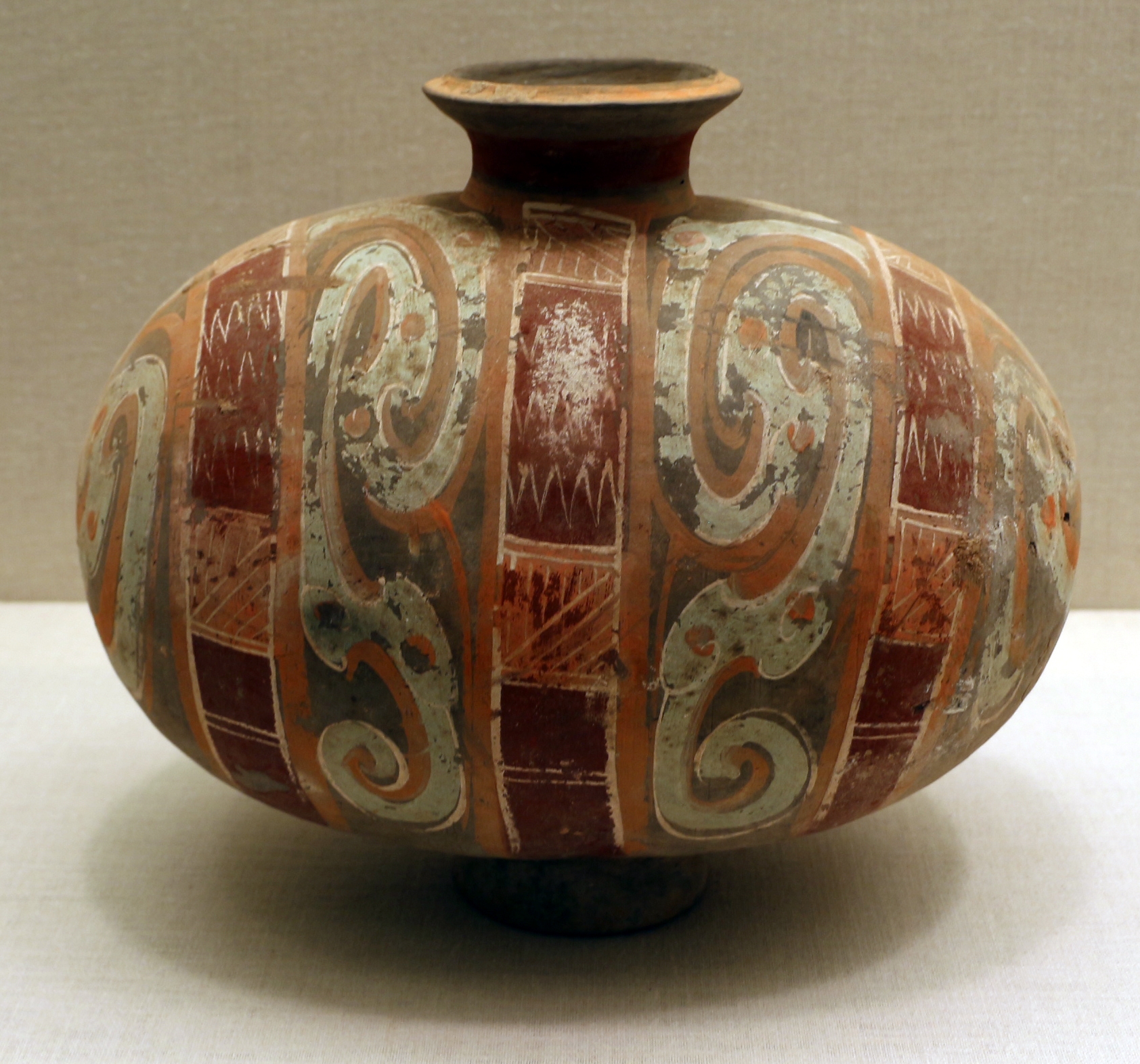
Eastern Han coccon jar, 1st century CE

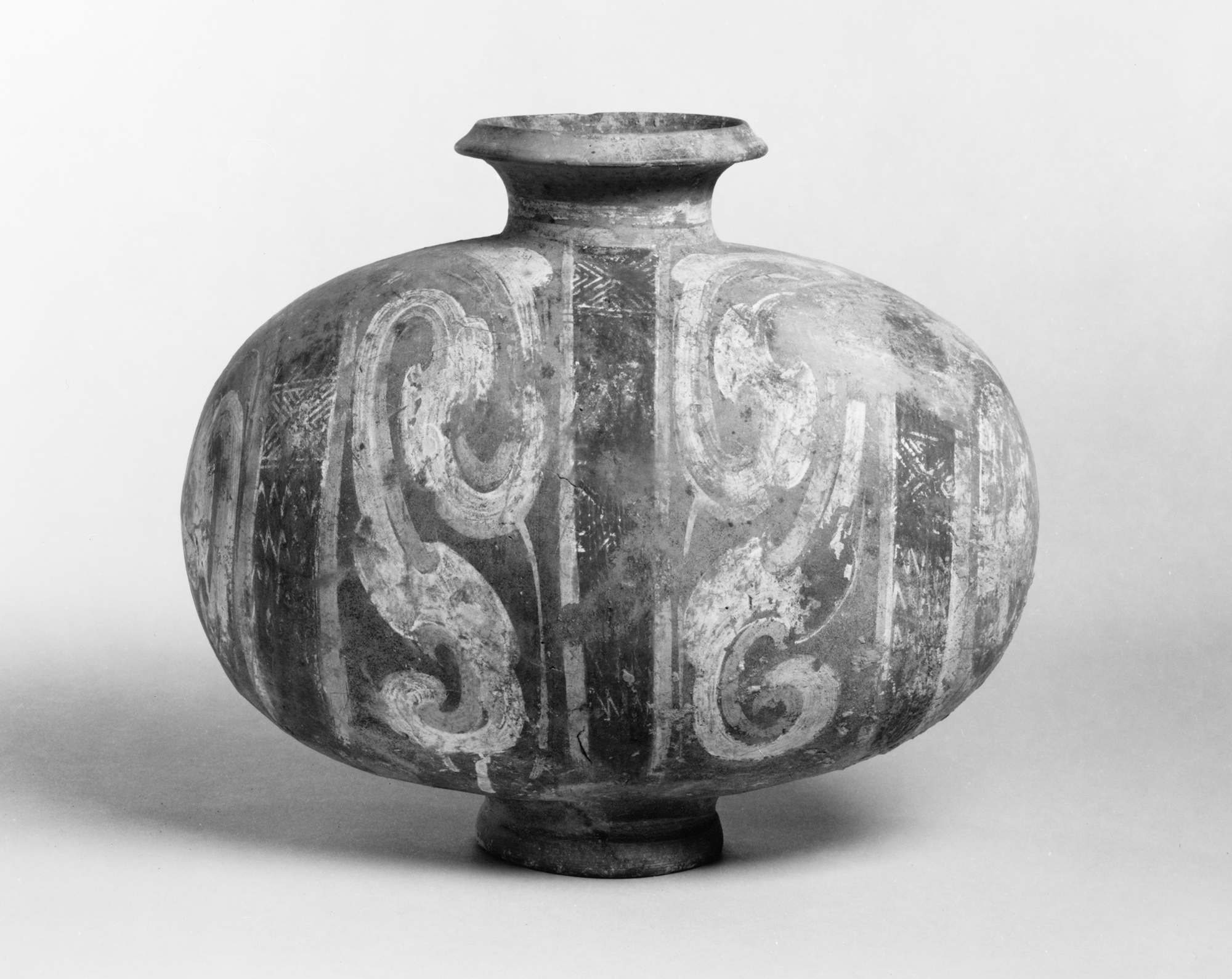
Cocoon-Shaped Jar, Han dynasty, Metropolitan Museum of Art.
