= Yanglang culture =

Archaeological site in Gansu, China

- Location of the Yanglang culture, with contemporary cultures in the 6th–5th century BCE
- Geographical range: Ningxia, Gansu
- Dates: 6th–3rd century BCE
- Major sites: 36.01°N 106.257°E
- Preceded by: Ordos culture (800–150 BCE); Shajing culture (800–200 BCE)
- Followed by: Qin dynasty

The Yanglang culture (杨郎青铜文化, 6th–3rd century BCE) is an early archeological culture of northwestern China, mainly identified by burial grounds in the southern part of the Ningxia Hui Autonomous Region, and in the adjacent Qingyang County of eastern Gansu. The culture is named after the Bronze culture Yanglang cemetery (杨郎墓地), excavated in 1989 in Guyuan, Ningxia. Other sites are the Pengbao cemetery (彭堡墓地) and Wang Dahu cemetery (王大户墓地). These sites are characterized by Chinese archaeology as belonging to the "Northern Bronze cultures of the Spring and Autumn Period" (春秋战国北方青铜文化), related to the Xirong (西戎) people. The famous Majiayuan site is considered as representative of the end of the Yanglang culture.

The Yanglang culture is thought to have been directly or indirectly connected to the Saka (Scythian) culture, with suggestions of direct prenetration of Saka groups into North China. The animal style of the funeral artifacts in particular connects it to the world of the steppes. In particular, the decorated chariots and many artifacts have strong resemblance with Saka objects from the Issyk-kul kurgan.

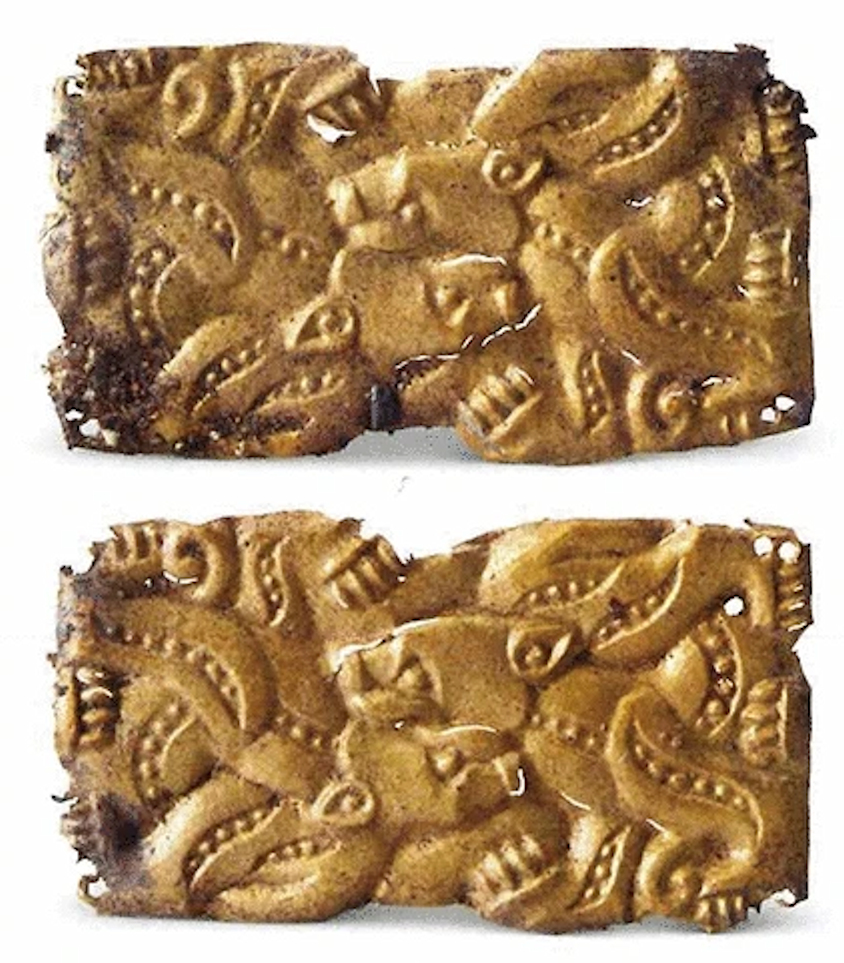
Gold belt plaques in animal style found in Majiayuan M4, Gansu.

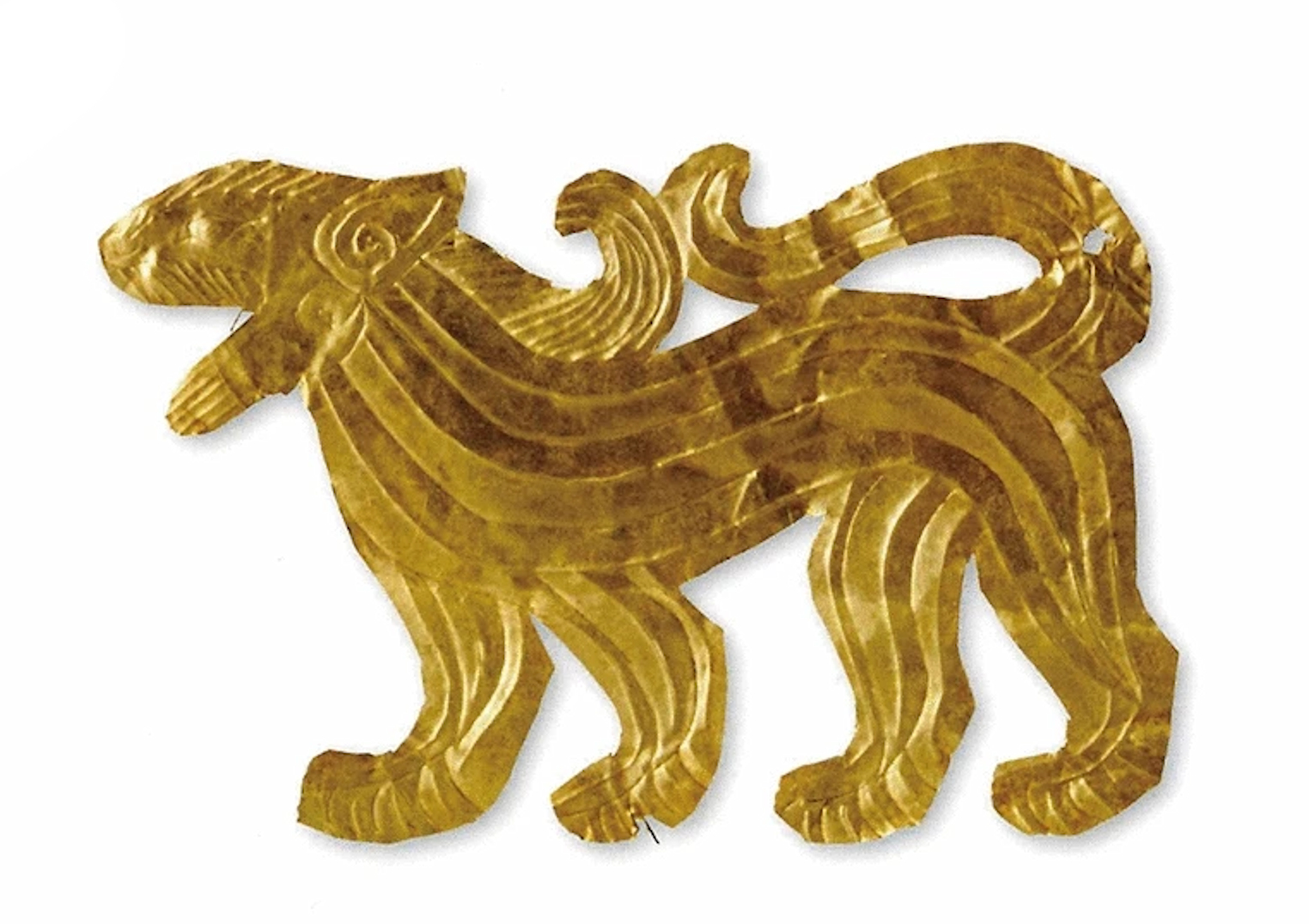
Gold plate in the form of walking feline found in Majiayuan M3, Gansu. The animal style of the funeral artifacts in particular connects it to the world of the steppes.

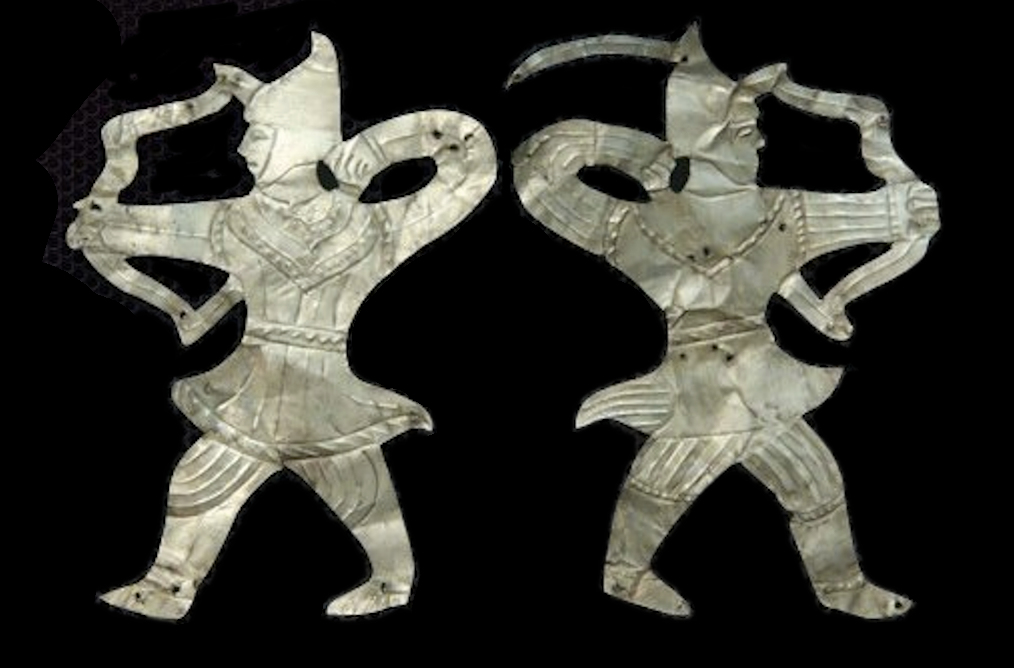
Majiayuan tomb figurines.
