= Barrel-shaped jug =

Pottery from Cyprus

The Barrel-shaped jug is a type of pottery known in the Mediterranean in the Ancient Cypriot art of the island of Cyprus, from the 10th century BCE to the 3rd century CE.

This type of jugs, with and without strainers, were quite common in Archaic Cypriot pottery. Because of their rounded shape, they do not stand on their own, suggesting a quite specific function. They are found in the tombs of Eastern Cyprus, and may only have had a funerary role.

These jars are very similar to Chinese Cocoon jars, and West-East transmission has been suggested.

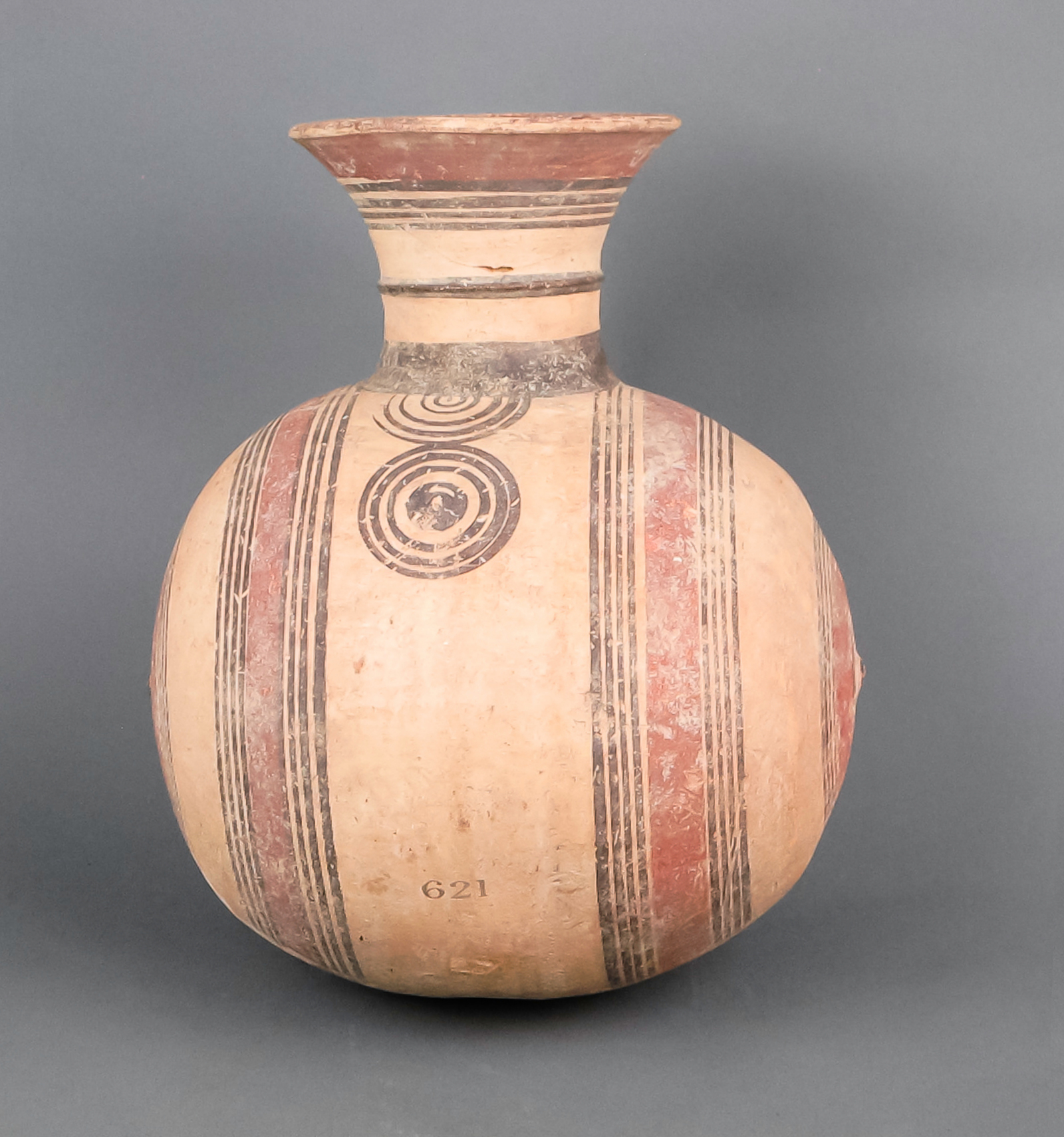
Terracotta barrel jug with strainer, Cypro-Geometric III. Cyprus, 850-750 BCE.

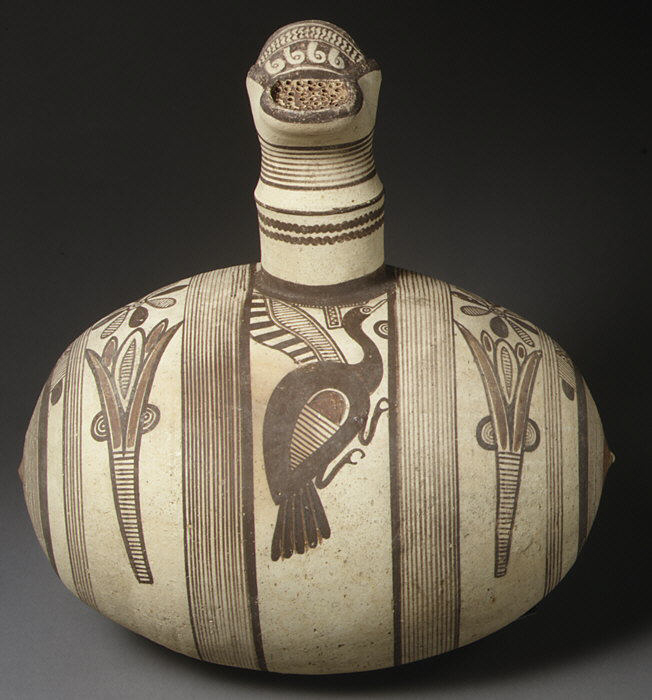
Terracotta barrel jug with strainer, Cyprus, 750-600 BCE.

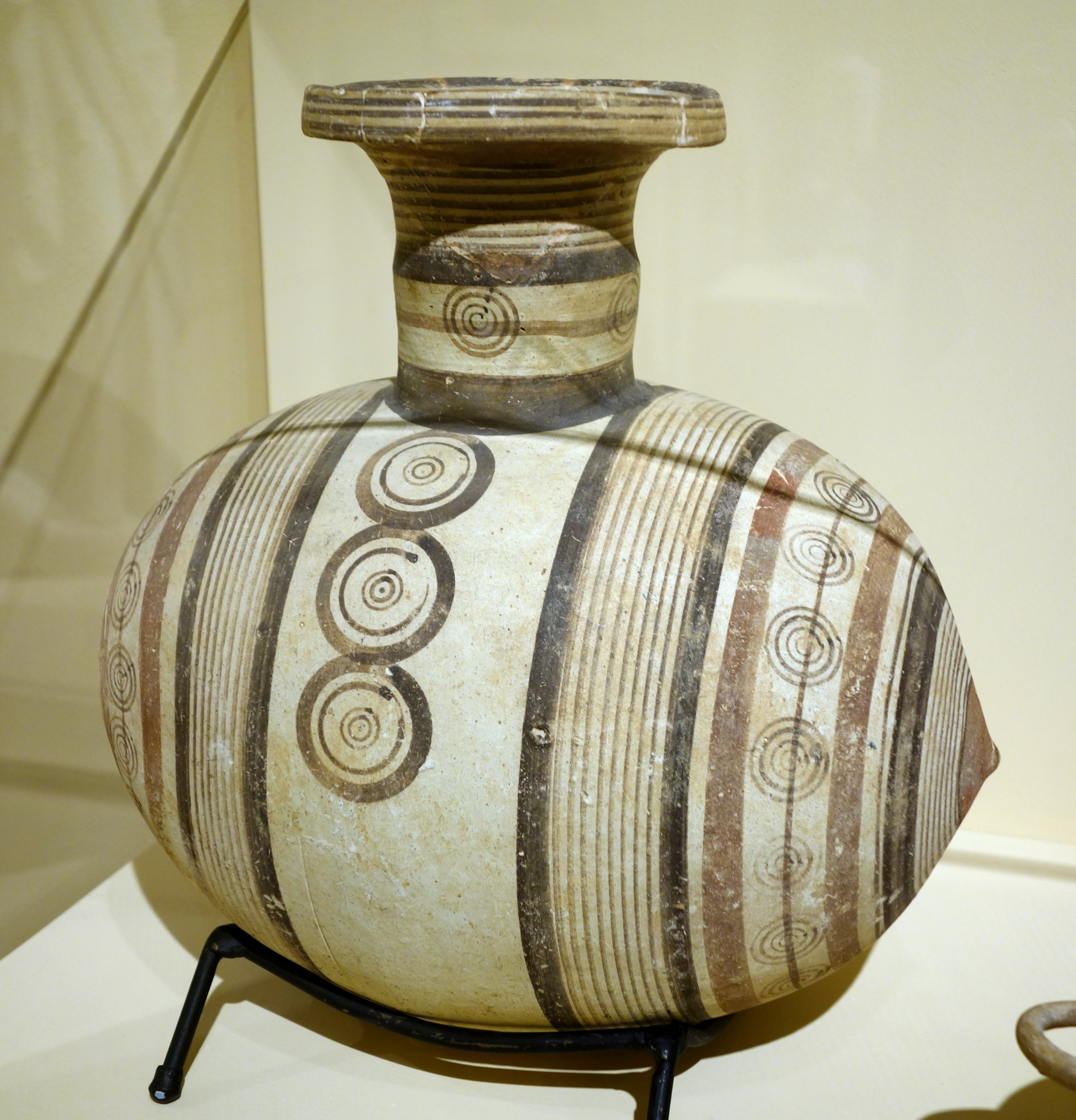
Ceramic barrel-shaped jug from the Cypro-Archaic I period (c.700-c.600 BCE)
