= Xirong =

Ancient grouping of people or peoples in China

- Zhou geography: Huaxia surrounded by the Four Barbarians—Dongyi in the east, Nanman in the south, Xirong in the west, and Beidi in the north.
- Chinese: 西戎
- Literal meaning: Western warlike people
Transcriptions
Standard Mandarin
- Hanyu Pinyin: Xīróng
- Wade–Giles: Hsi-jung

Xirong (Chinese: 西戎; pinyin: Xīróng; Wade–Giles: Hsi-jung; lit. 'Western warlike people') or Rong were various people who lived primarily in and around the western extremities of ancient China (in modern Gansu and Qinghai). They were known as early as the Shang dynasty (1765–1122 BCE), as one of the Four Barbarians that frequently (and often violently) interacted with the sinitic Huaxia civilization. They typically resided to the west of Guanzhong Plains from the Zhou dynasty (1046–221 BCE) onwards. They were mentioned in some ancient Chinese texts as perhaps genetically and linguistically related to the people of the Chinese civilization.

== Name ==
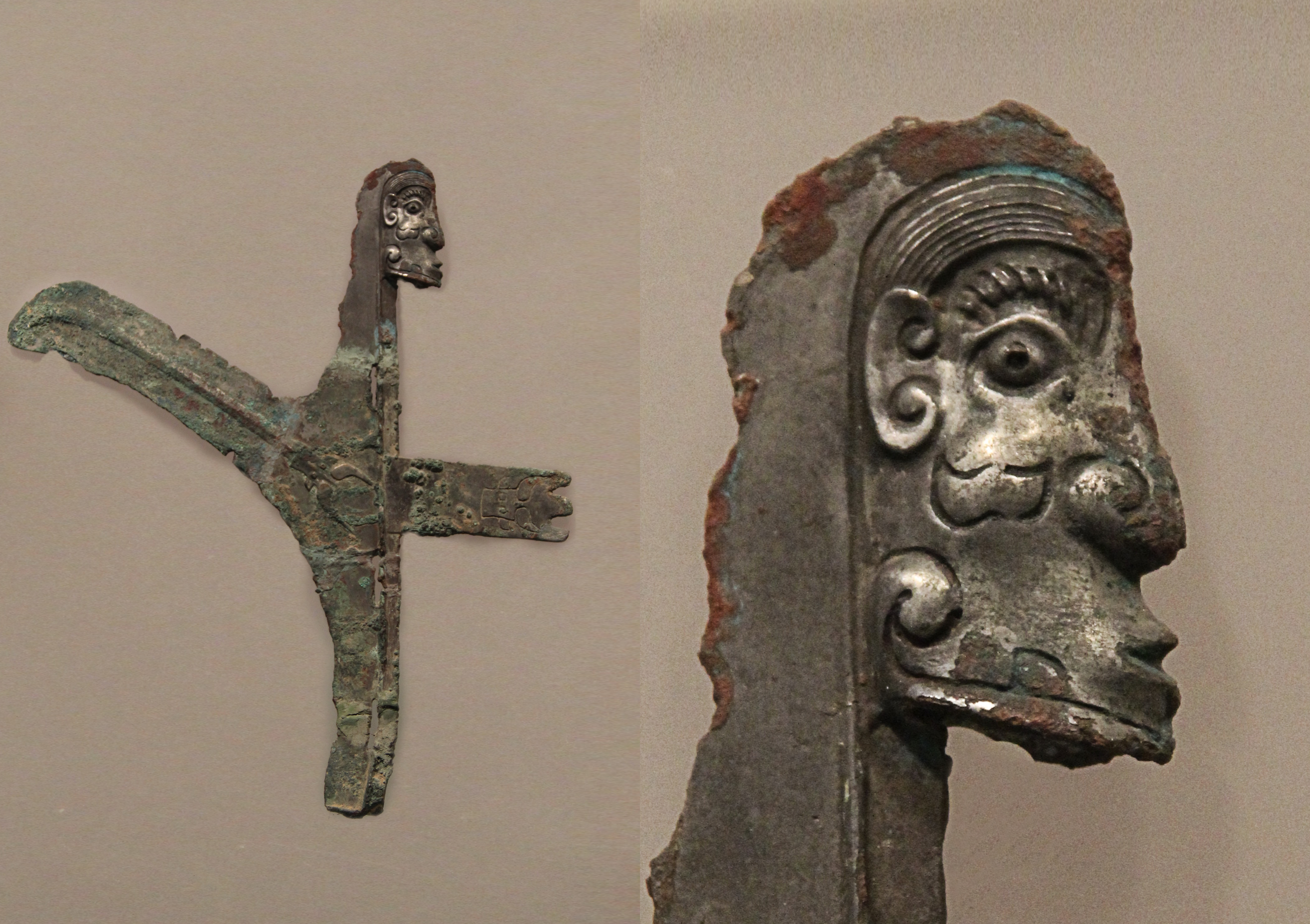
Anthropomorphic axe, bronze, excavated in the tomb of Heibo (潶伯), a military noble in charge of protecting the northern frontier, at Baicaopo, Lingtai County, Western Zhou period (1045–771 BCE). Gansu Museum. This is considered as a possible depiction of a Xianyun.

According to Nicola Di Cosmo, 'Rong' was a vague term for warlike foreigner. He places them from the upper Wei River valley and along the Fen River to the Taiyuan basin as far as the Taihang Mountains. This would be the northwestern edge of what was then China and also the transition zone between agricultural and steppe ways of life.

The historian Li Feng says that during the Western Zhou period, since the term Rong "warlike foreigners" was "often used in bronze inscriptions to mean 'warfare', it is likely that when a people was called 'Rong', the Zhou considered them as political and military adversaries rather than as cultural and ethnic 'others'." Paul R. Goldin also proposes that Rong was a "pseudo-ethnonym" meaning "bellicose".

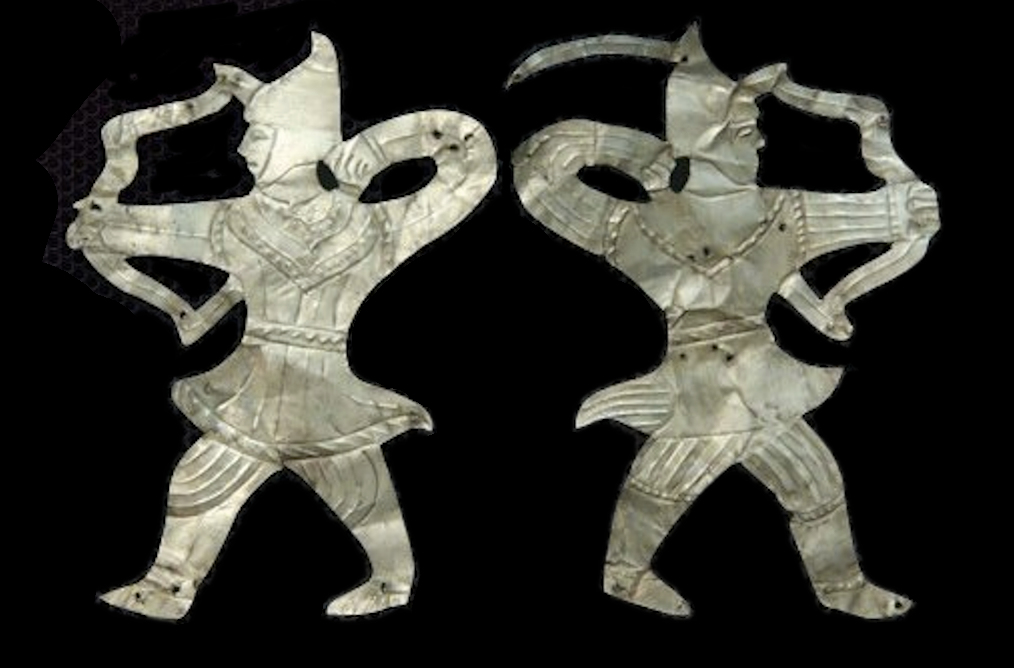
Saka-style Majiayuan culture tomb figurines (3rd-2nd century BCE).

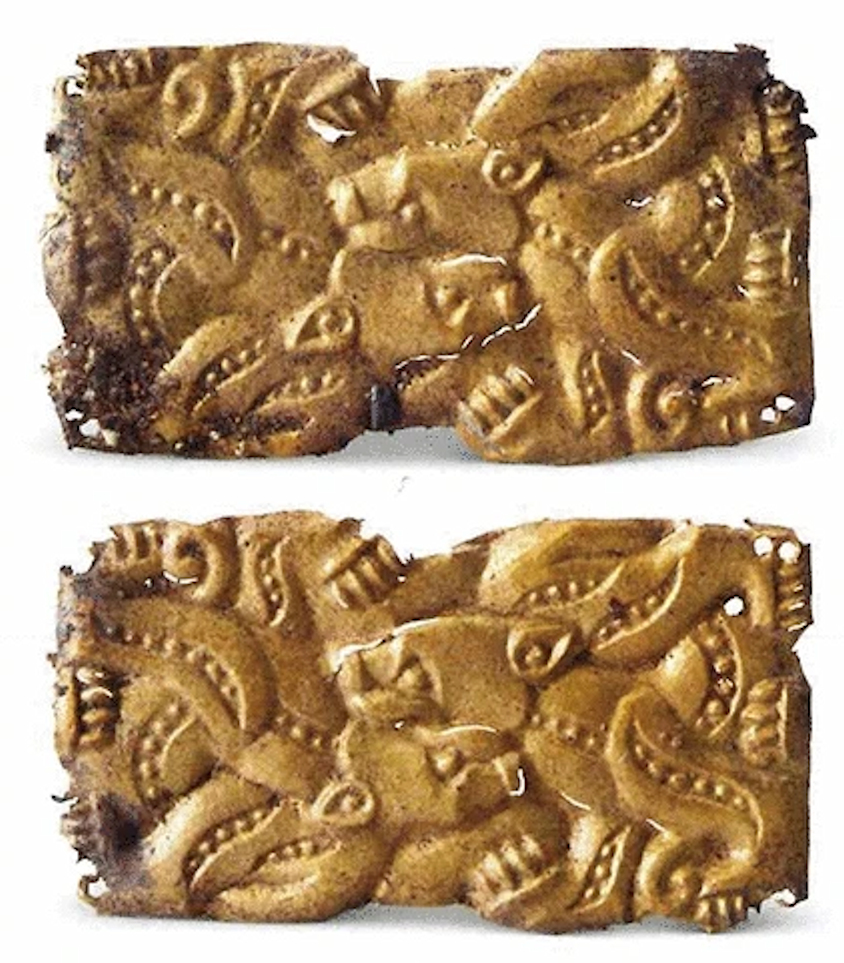
Xirong gold belt plaques in animal style found in Majiayuan M4, Gansu, 3rd century BCE.

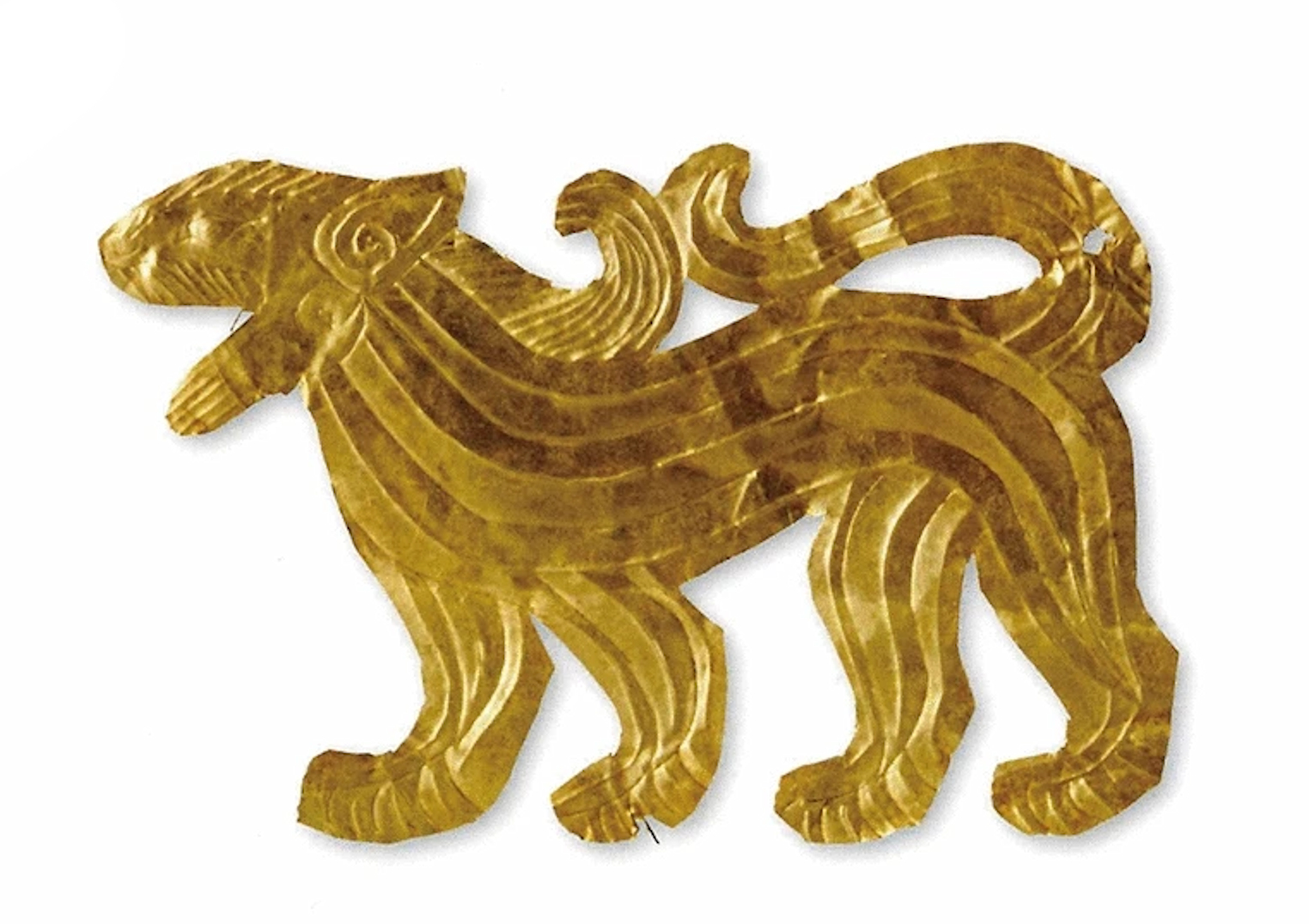
Xirong gold plate in the form of walking feline found in Majiayuan M3, Gansu.

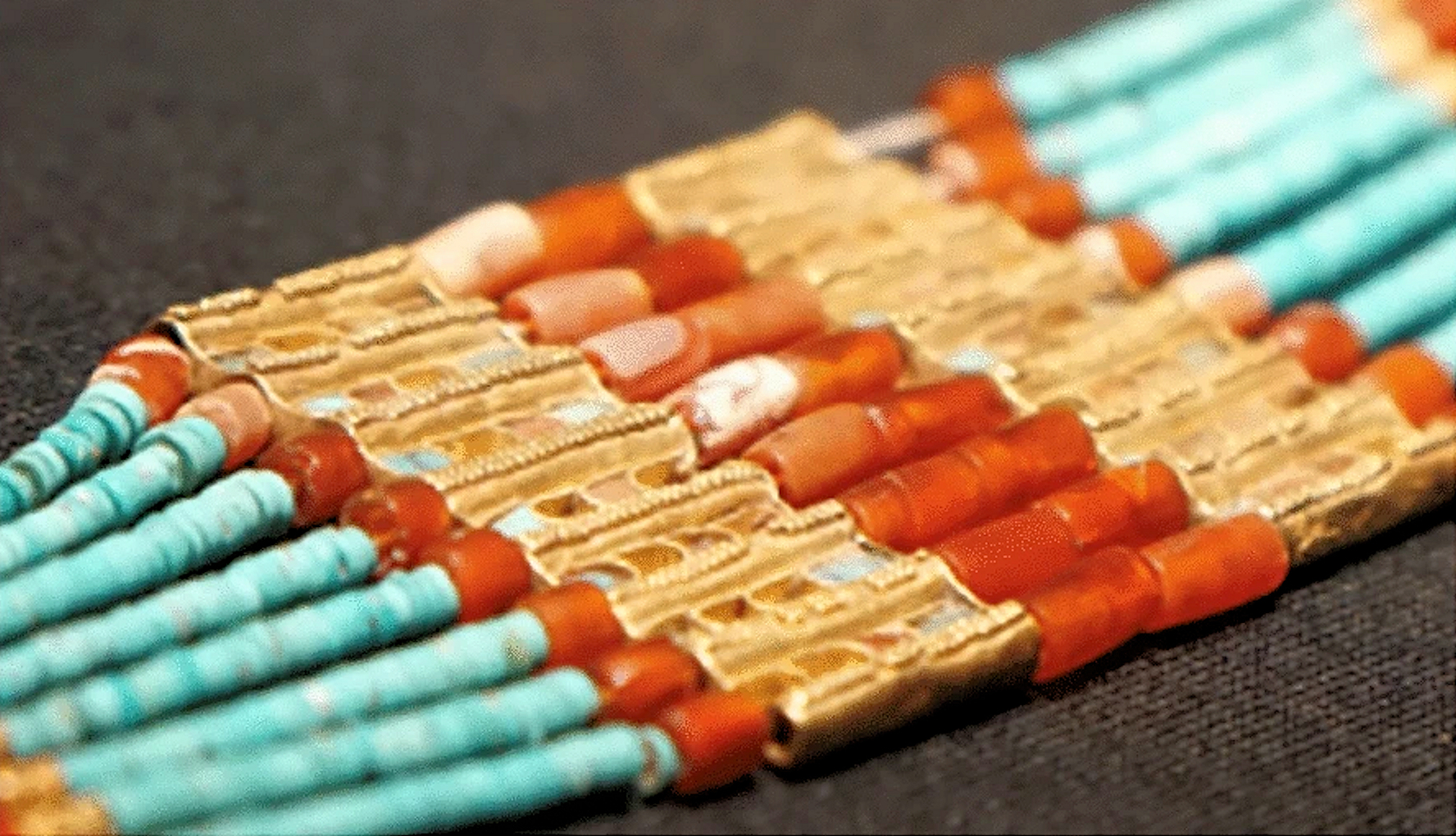
Necklace decorated with granulation, unearthed in Majiayuan, Gansu Provincial Institute of Cultural Relics and Archaeology.

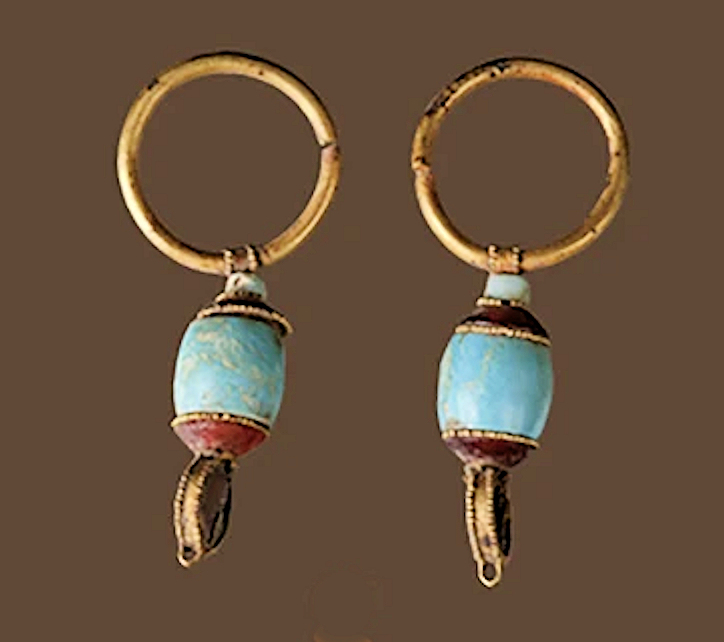
Xirong earrings, Majiayuan cemetery in Gansu, the Warring states Period, Gansu Provincial Institute of Cultural Relics and Archaeology.

After the Zhou dynasty, the term usually referred to various peoples in the west during early and late medieval times. Xirong was also the name of a state during the Spring and Autumn and Warring States periods of Chinese history.

The Xirong together with the eastern Dongyi, northern Beidi, and southern Nanman were collectively called the Sìyí (四夷; 'Four Barbarians'). The Liji "Record of Rites" details ancient stereotypes about them.

The people of those five regions – the Middle states, and the [Rong], [Yi], (and other wild tribes round them) – had all their several natures, which they could not be made to alter. The tribes on the east were called [Yi]. They had their hair unbound, and tattooed their bodies. Some of them ate their food without its being cooked. Those on the south were called Man. They tattooed their foreheads, and had their feet turned in towards each other. Some of them (also) ate their food without its being cooked. Those on the west were called [Rong]. They had their hair unbound, and wore skins. Some of them did not eat grain-food. Those on the north were called [Di]. They wore skins of animals and birds, and dwelt in caves. Some of them also did not eat grain-food. The people of the Middle states, and of those [Yi], Man, [Rong], and [Di], all had their dwellings, where they lived at ease; their flavours which they preferred; the clothes suitable for them; their proper implements for use; and their vessels which they prepared in abundance. In those five regions, the languages of the people were not mutually intelligible, and their likings and desires were different. To make what was in their minds apprehended, and to communicate their likings and desires, (there were officers) – in the east, called transmitters; in the south, representationists; in the west, [Di-dis]; and in the north, interpreters. [The term 狄鞮 didi (ti-ti) is identified as: "(anc.) Interpreter of the Di, barbarians of the west." Translated and adapted from the French.]

Note: "middle states" (Chinese: 中國; pinyin: Zhōngguó) in this quotation refers to the "Middle Kingdom", i.e. China.

Spade-foot three-legged pottery vessels as well as one and two handled pots were primary cultural characteristics of the Xirong.

William H. Baxter and Laurent Sagart (2014) reconstruct the Old Chinese name of Róng as 戎, OC:*‍nuŋ, mod. róng. Today, similar-sounding self-designated ethnonyms among modern-day Tibeto-Burman peoples in western China include Rgyalrong of Sichuan, and Nung and Trung of northwestern Yunnan (see also Rung languages). Průšek suggests relations between the Rong during the Zhou dynasty and the Rén (人 < OC *ni[ŋ]) tribes during Shang dynasty, however, the Rén (人) dwelt in southern Shandong and northern Jiangsu, thus east, not west, of the Shang.

== Timeline ==
- c. 964 BCE: King Mu of Zhou defeated the Quanrong and the following year attacked the Western Rong and Xurong.
- 859 BCE: King Yi of Zhou (Ji Xie): Zhou capital attacked by the Rong of Taiyuan.
- 877–841 BCE: King Li of Zhou: Western Rong and Xianyun raid deep into Zhou territory
- 827–782 BCE: King Xuan of Zhou sends the State of Qin to attack Western Rong who submit and cede territory, sends the State of Jin against the Northern Rong (probably 788); following year destroys the Rong Jiang clan.
- 781–771 BCE: King You of Zhou is killed by the Quanrong, ending the Western Zhou.
- During the Western Zhou various Rong groups are interspersed among the cities of the North China Plain. It seems that the Beidi were pressing the Rong from the north.
- 714 BCE: Northern (Bei) or Mountain (Shan) Rong attack the State of Zheng.
- 706 BCE: The same group attacks Qi.
- 693–662 BCE: Duke Zhuang of Lu, ruler of the State of Lu, has many wars with the Rong.
- 664 BCE: Shan Rong attack the State of Yan.
- 662 BCE: Beidi drive the Rong out of Taiyuan.
- 650 BCE: Beirong attacked by the States of Qi and Xu.
- After 650 BCE, the Rong are rarely mentioned. They seem to have been mostly absorbed by the States of Qi and Jin.
- 314 BCE: Qin defeated the last hostile Rong tribe. Threats from unified nomadic incursions would eventually reappear under the Xiongnu identity during the subsequent Qin and Han dynasties.

== Ethnicity ==
It is believed that the Quanrong during the Western Zhou-Warring States period (1122–476 BC) spoke a Tibeto-Burman branch of the Sino-Tibetan languages, and united with the Jiang clan to rebel against the Zhou. Mencius mentioned that even King Wen of Zhou had ancestries from the "western barbarians" (西夷).

7th-century scholar Yan Shigu made these remarks about the Wusuns, one group included to the "western barbarians": "Among the barbarians (戎; Róng) in the Western Regions, the look of the Wusun is the most unusual. The present barbarians (胡人; húrén) who have green eyes and red hair, and look like macaque monkeys, are the offspring of this people"; the exonym 胡人 Húrén "foreigners, barbarians", was used from the 6th century to denote Iranian peoples, especially Sogdians, in Central Asia, besides other non-Chinese peoples.

Genetic data on ancient Qiang remains associated with the Xirong were determined to display high genetic affinity with contemporary Sino-Tibetan peoples as well as with ancient 'Yellow River farmers' of the Yangshao culture.

== See also ==
- Qiang (historical) and modern people)
- Gyalrong people
- Tangut people
- Guifang
- Hua-Yi Distinction
- Ji Jili
- Sinocentrism
