= Religious art and culture of the Shang dynasty =

Art, music and architecture of Shang religion

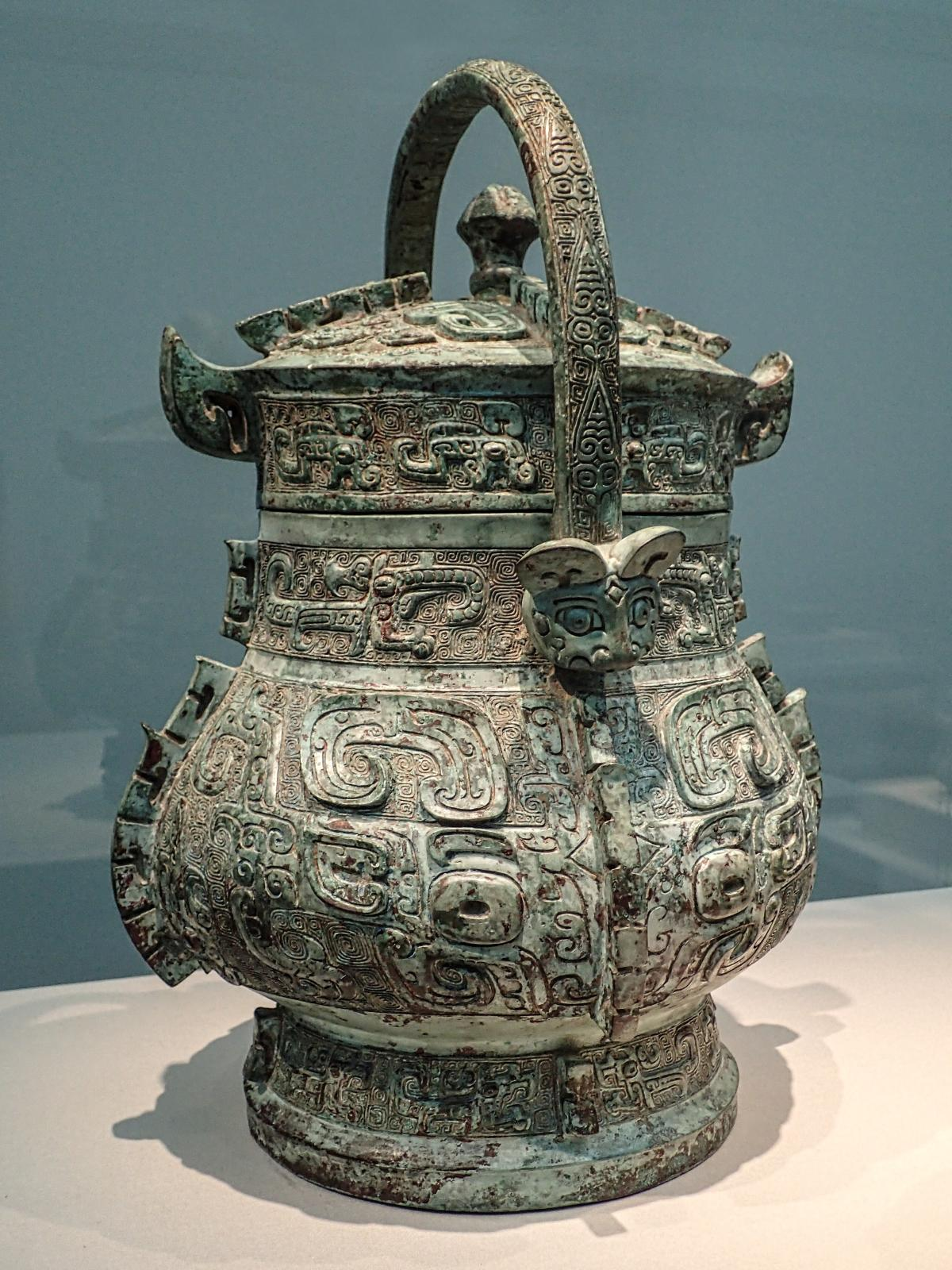
Late Shang bronze you vessel decorated by taotie and dragon patterns

The religious art and culture of the Shang dynasty (c. 1600 – 1046 BC), the second royal dynasty of China, comprised the imagery, objects, buildings and performances through which they addressed their ancestors, the nature powers and the high god Di. Almost all surviving Shang art was ritual in function, and much of it was made to be buried. It is known chiefly from the royal cemetery and settlement at Yinxu near Anyang, from the earlier centres at Zhengzhou, Yanshi and Xiaoshuangqiao, and from the oracle bone inscriptions, which supply the only contemporary written commentary on it. Because Shang inscriptions record divination rather than doctrine, and because the royal tombs were looted soon after the fall of Shang, the relationship between Shang art and the spirits named in the texts is disputed at almost every point.

Characteristic of Shang ritual art is a frontal animal-like face, conventionally called the taotie after a term applied to it by Song dynasty antiquarians. Assembled from the horns, jaws and claws of real and imaginary creatures, it appears on ritual bronzes from the Early Shang onward, shares them with dragons, birds, cicadas and tigers, and has been read in turn as a shamanic helper, as an image of the king's transformation, as a projection of the celestial pole and as ornament without significance. No interpretation is unequivocally agreed on. Colour carried meaning of its own, recoverable in part from the vocabulary of the inscriptions and from the red pigment, cinnabar and lacquer applied to bones, coffins and stone.

Ritual was as much performed as visualised. Bells, chimestones and hide-covered drums accompanied sacrifice and dance, and the inscriptions record divinations over which instruments to use and on what day; cattle, millet ale and human victims were offered in settings ranging from open-air rammed-earth altars to the possibly cosmology-derived roofed halls and courtyards of the Yinxu precinct. Making the objects was a religious undertaking in its own right, consuming metal, fuel and skilled labour on a scale that shaped the economy around it, and sharing its assumptions with divination. Beyond the Shang heartland, neighbouring bronze-using societies worked the same materials to quite different religious ends. After the Zhou conquest the ancestral cult persisted, but the vessel repertory was remade and the mask was abandoned by the eighth century BC. Shang bronzes returned as objects of antiquarian study under the Song.

== Ritual art ==
=== Evidence ===
Shang art was primarily ritual in function. The sinologist David Keightley argued that in a society which "even at the elite level, may largely have been illiterate", high art served as a kind of writing – a medium conveying, through decorated bronzes, ornamented chariots and elaborate burials, the elite domination and authority that texts, characterised as illegible to most, could not yet convey. On this view such art functioned as the writing system later would, as an esoteric code granting privileged access to material and spiritual resources to those educated to read it.

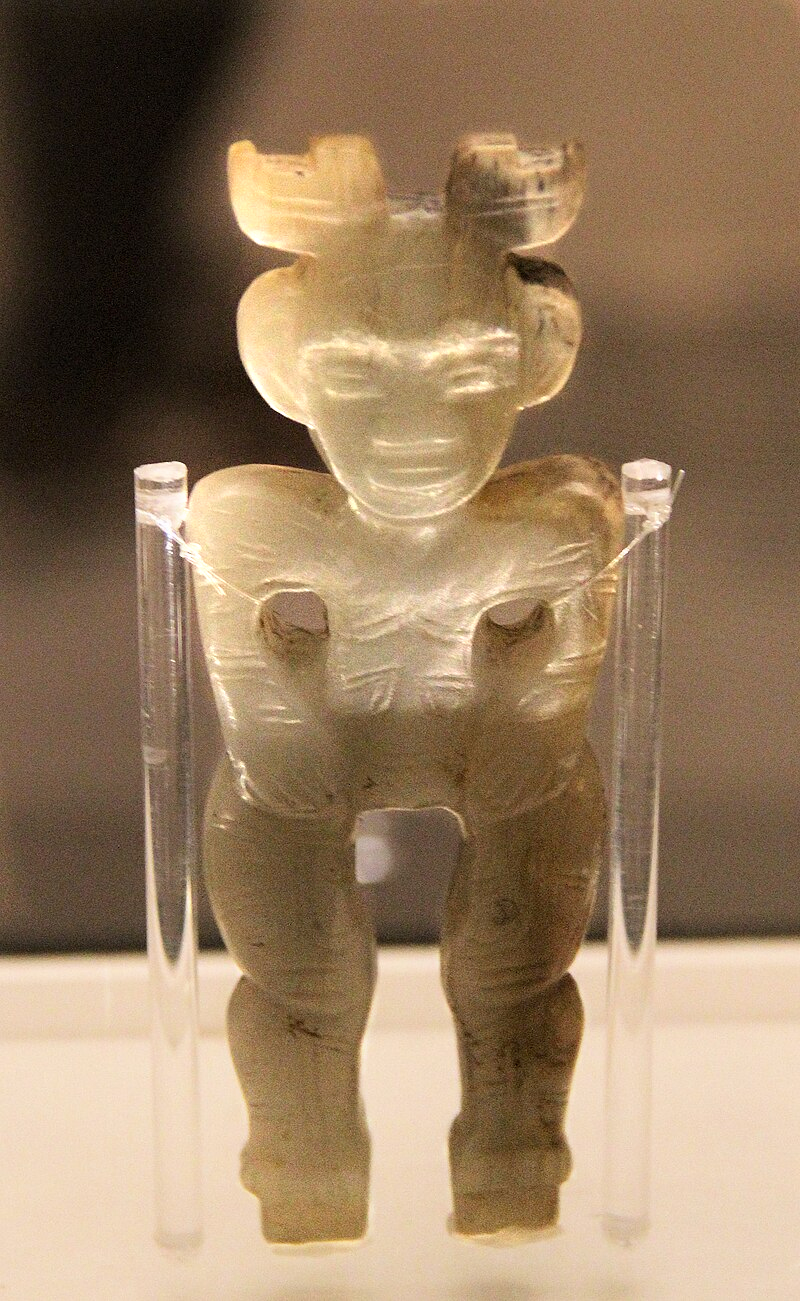
Jade human figure from the Tomb of Fu Hao. Keightley placed such pieces in the naturalistic rather than the hieratic mode of Shang art.

Keightley distinguished two modes within Shang visual art. One is relatively naturalistic, seen in ornamental jades of turtles, geese, horses and kneeling figures from the Tomb of Fu Hao; these appear to have been ornaments of daily life rather than ritual insignia, and as such may not have carried any powerful symbolic or religious message, being "not involved in contacting the ancestors who had … become abstractions and were not conceived in naturalistic terms". The other, which he followed William Watson in calling hieratic, is abstract and schematic, associated with sacred things and highly stylised; on bronzes in particular "the orderly and symmetrical placement of the decorative elements was a paramount concern". The two modes were not opposed but formed a single tradition spanning a spectrum.

Shang artistic expressions bear no explicit relations to the pantheon described in oracle bone texts; rather, their art carried social and religious significance that varied by place and changed over time. A century of work on some two hundred thousand oracle bone fragments has produced no information of the kind early scholars expected, such as proper names for the animal images, and the bronze zoomorphs represent neither definite deities nor ancestors while still being more than merely decorative. Sarah Allan puts forward that the motifs cannot be related to the spirits named in oracle bone inscriptions. The images themselves point the same way: the referents of the animal masks in the natural world are often hard to discern, and Late Shang bronze decor appears to derive from earlier animal-mask designs.

Keightley preferred to speak of Shang "religiosity" rather than of a Shang religion. What survives is unrepresentative, and in a way that bears directly on what can be said about the art. Little was recovered from the royal tombs at Xibeigang, looted soon after the fall of Anyang, resulting in scholars still disagreeing over which tomb belongs to which king. The richest Shang burial yet excavated is not a royal one – the tomb of Fu Hao, which escaped the robbers because her temple foundation sat over it, yielded some two thousand objects, including 468 bronzes and 755 jades. The analysis of ritual art ideally begins from the setting in which it was seen, but very little of the original architectural and urban context has been preserved, and there are no known eye-witness accounts of Shang ritual.

A further absence is one of subject matter rather than of preservation. In contrast to every other early civilisation of the Old and New Worlds, the Shang and Zhou core area shows a complete absence, down to the beginning of the imperial period, of any depiction of important human beings, and neither dynasty represented its deities in human form – an "apparent taboo", in Lothar von Falkenhausen's words. Where human faces and figures do appear in Shang art they carry the same hieratic character as the taotie, and are often absorbed into it – as on the Heda fangding from Huangcai in Ningxiang, where human faces are built into the structure of the design, complete with small animal claws at the sides. The prohibition belongs with a wider feature of the tradition, the near-absence of figures shown in action, and was not shared by the neighbours of the Shang and Zhou, as the anthropomorphic bronzes of Sanxingdui at Guanghan make plain.

=== Principles ===
Several religious principles have been identified as shaping Shang visual art: the dualistic outlook of Shang cosmology, the impersonalisation of the ancestral cult, and the concept of yi metamorphosis. Shang divination characteristically framed its charges as paired positive and negative propositions, cracked on the right and left of a single shell. Much Shang art was also "characterized by the symmetrical opposition of images", further evidence of the value Shang elites placed on such binary oppositions.

The Shang ancestral cult had the character of an impersonalised one, in which the dead were stripped of individuality on becoming ancestors, and the art correspondingly avoids depicting them in direct human form. Keightley located the mechanism in the ritual calendar itself: each royal ancestor received cult on the day of the stem carried in his temple name, Da Jia on a jia day and Da Geng on a geng day, and it was this scheduling that "turned the royal dead into ancestors". An art addressed to recipients so conceived had little use for portraiture. The same orientation accounts for the tradition's "remarkable endurance and conservatism": patrons who worshipped their ancestors were not disposed to alter the forms in which those ancestors were addressed, and early Chinese artisans valued abstraction and geometric ordering.

Elizabeth Childs-Johnson has argued that Shang imagery is dominated by the rendering of transformation, or yi (異) – the power to metamorphose in order to communicate with and identify with the spirit world, and specifically the king's prerogative to bin (賓), "to identify with the spirit world". On this reading the principal vehicle of the idea is the semi-human animal mask, accompanied by subordinate images of metamorphosis such as the feng bird, the long dragon, the cicada, the snake and the owl. The graph yi itself is a logogram depicting a human wearing a mask, so that graph and image render the same conception.

In her fuller treatment Childs-Johnson places yi in a class of sacred, spirit-oriented verbs, alongside bin and zhu (祝), "to invoke spirits", whose subjects in the inscriptions are only ever the king, living or dead, and Di. The metamorphosis they name is a change of standing rather than of shape: to be empowered by a spirit through the wearing of a mask, and so to be identified with whatever the mask represents. Bin, conventionally rendered "to entertain a guest", primarily means "to receive a spirit" or "to be received by one"; because dead kings could bin more senior ancestors and Di could bin a past king, the living king who performed the rite was exercising a power otherwise proper to gods.

On her account two strands of belief run through Shang religion and its art: an older, shaman-like metamorphism preceding the ancestral cult, and the cult of the royal dead itself, the two fusing during the Late Shang. The mask guise consistently belongs to a species of hunted wild animal, a claim supported by the faunal material recovered at Shang sites.

=== The taotie motif ===
The most conspicuous motif of Shang ritual art is a frontal, animal-like face conventionally called the taotie, whose name is a later attribution and is disputed. Taotie typically represents a central ridge surrounded by various animal beings, including deer, horses, dragons, and phoenixes, often blended with human features. The term first occurs in the Zuozhuan, where Tao Tie is one of four malevolent beings, and is glossed as a glutton; the Lüshi chunqiu supplies the first association of the name with a bronze motif, describing ding decorated with a taotie that "has a head but no body" and devours a man. The two were matched to the surviving motif by Song dynasty antiquarians, in particular in Lü Dalin's Kaogu tu. The association has been called misleading, and two replacements proposed: the neutral description "two-eyed motif", and, on the ground that a label of Warring States and Han date is being applied to material at least a thousand years older, "metamorphic power mask".

It has been shown that the taotie was not a Shang invention. A facial motif built around a pair of eyes appears on Liangzhu jades of the late Neolithic, passes into comparable designs of the Henan Longshan cultures, and recurs at Erlitou before appearing on Shang bronzes. A related rectangular design is found in the northwestern Qijia culture. John C. Didier distinguishes two lines of descent that converge in the Shang motif – an ornate one carrying the relief, fangs, claws and horns of the Liangzhu and Longshan faces, and a spare one descending from the Yangshao ungulate head by way of the plain Erlitou face – reading the long-lived motif as a projection of the celestial pole and the tubular cong of Liangzhu as a shaft directing the spirit of the dead toward the polar square. A different conclusion has been drawn from the same sequence: what persists is a stylistic idiom rather than a fixed meaning, one "continually invested with (and then largely denuded of) meanings" across the Neolithic and early Bronze Age. Robert Bagley questions the underlying continuity from a different direction, observing that the jade inventories of Erlitou and Liangzhu barely overlap and give "no reason to suspect any particular connection between the two cultures": of the three characteristic Liangzhu jade shapes, the axe occurs at Erlitou in forms not especially close to the Liangzhu ones, the cong is represented by a single reported fragment, and the disk does not occur at all. (Note: Bagley allows one exception: a jade handle decorated with faces in thread relief folded around its corners, which he takes to derive from Liangzhu work.) Allan takes an intermediate position: many scholars have sought the origin of the taotie in the Liangzhu cong, which carries two eyes and a horizontal bar suggesting a nose or mouth; and although there is "no direct line of development" from that motif to the taotie as it appears at Zhengzhou or even Erlitou, the cong itself was plainly introduced from Liangzhu, so some cultural diffusion may be assumed.

The motif appears from the Early Shang onward and is present at Zhengzhou, Erligang and Xiaoshuangqiao before reaching its most elaborate forms at Anyang. Its composition varies continually. Only the eyes are constant; horns may be those of a ram, buffalo or tiger, and a human nose, ears or eyebrows frequently suggest that the face is at least partly human. The animal attributes have been read as belonging consistently to hunted species – tiger, buffalo, bighorn sheep and deer – with long dragons or feng birds flanking the mask in subordinate positions. The design is also visually ambiguous, readable either as a single face seen frontally or as two profile animals confronting one another, an ambiguity that appears to have been deliberate. Attempts to define the motif exhaustively have produced long catalogues of variants without arriving at a stable description; Bernhard Karlgren, and K. C. Chang with the assistance of a computer, both tried to classify its variations without success, each vessel being a new creation derived from what preceded it. In its simplest Erligang form the motif reduces to two eyes with some further suggestion of a face, the body undefined; the eyes alone, Allan argues, "alert us to the presence of a creature or being", and suggest an unknown power which sees but cannot be seen. (Note: Allan records that Ernst Gombrich saw eyes as inspiring fear and so frequently serving an apotropaic function, but rejects that reading for the Shang: there is no evident rationale for averting evil on vessels meant to feed the spirits, and Shang religion did not divide spirits into benevolent and malevolent classes.)

==== Interpretations ====
No consensus exists on what, if anything, this motif represents. Kwang-chih Chang argued that the animals on Shang and Zhou bronzes are "iconographically meaningful as the images of the various animals that served as the helpers of shamans and shamanesses in the task of Heaven-Earth, dead-living intercommunication". His case rests largely on Eastern Zhou and Han texts – the Guoyu, Zuozhuan, Shanhaijing and Chuci – together with comparative ethnography, a reliance defended on the ground that such texts preserve continuities from earlier periods. The creatures he drew from those texts include the taotie itself, the one-footed kui, the dragon and the hornless qiu, all taken for the shaman's spiritual helpers and identified with the monster images cast on Shang and Zhou ritual bronzes. The comparative half of the case reached further still: a shared Palaeolithic substratum of shamanic cosmology on both the Asian and American Pacific coasts, ancestral to both Chinese and Mayan civilisation, which Chang called the "Maya–China continuum" and which, he held, "ties ancient China and ancient Maya together and explains their similarities without resorting to diffusionism". Both halves of the case have drawn objections. (Note: Kesner objects that Shang inscriptional evidence gives little support for shamanic flight, and that four of the seven objects on which Chang builds his reading of the man-and-beast motif come from south-central China and may reflect a regional tradition. Didier rejects the reading outright, holding that no evidence establishes shamanism as a part of royal Shang religion, and regards Chang's further attempt to read the motif's bilateral symmetry as an image of the two-branch kingship as strained. Feng Qu objects to both sides of the exchange, holding that advocates and critics alike have largely not examined the sources of Chang's theoretical ideas; he treats Keightley as the exception for examining the ethnographic and historical literature in depth, while judging his citation of it selective.)

Allan holds that the art alludes to the spirit world in a general rather than a specific manner. Because the motif is in continual transformation, it is neither a particular animal nor a definable mythological creature; its religious force comes from disjunction, double images and transformation, creating a sense of "the Other … which can never be precisely defined". On this view the motifs cannot be matched to the deities and ancestors named in the oracle bone inscriptions at all. A fuller statement grounds this in a theory of mythic art. Myth is defined by its breach of natural limitation, and the art generated by the same religious structure breaches it in parallel, through "disjunction, distortion, illusion and transformation"; such art alludes to reality without depicting it. The Shang motifs are therefore "in the original sense of the word, awful, inspired with a sense of the sacred", and are generated directly from the religious structure rather than from any body of myth, which is why they illustrate nothing. (Note: Allan distinguishes mythic from illustrative art, the latter requiring a developed literary tradition in which an artist can externalise a story and treat it as an entity. She contrasts the continually shifting Shang motifs with the paintings of the Chu silk manuscript, whose illustrator had evidently worked from a verbal description.) A functional conclusion follows: the vessels were made to hold offerings, and were "decorated in the language of the spirit world so that the boundary between the living and the dead might be crossed and the sacrifice be received by those for whom it was intended". On this reading the taotie represents no deity and is non-representational because continually changing, but is nonetheless "a meaningful image, characterized by two staring eyes and made up of various animals used in the sacrificial rites", its open mouth suggesting the passage the vessels' contents must make.

Childs-Johnson reads the mask as an image of yi metamorphosis – the king's power to transform in order to identify with the spirit world – and treats the graph yi itself as depicting a masked human figure. On her reading the graph shows a frontal standing figure in a mask, arms raised symmetrically and ending in three claws, and it names a change of ontological rather than physical status: to be empowered by a spirit through the wearing of a mask. Graph and image are joined by way of two oracle bone fragments on which yi is written at twice the size of the surrounding divination, compared with the enlarged displayed figures that cover the faces of a bronze drum in the Sumitomo collection and of a marble liding in Stockholm. Four patterns recur – the bifurcated frontal body, the symmetrically displayed limbs ending in claws, the emphasised eyes and the horned headdress. She calls this practice "institutionalised metamorphism", a shaman-like performance absorbed into an already literate state, and distinguishes her position from Chang's on the ground that she argues from Shang-period evidence rather than from Warring States texts. That distinction has not gone unchallenged: her work has been grouped with the readings inspired by Chang's trance hypothesis rather than set against them. (Note: Childs-Johnson offers the reading as provisional – "our reading of yi may not be final" – and concedes that the marble liding is drawn with two claws rather than the three or four her criterion requires. The nearest physical evidence she adduces for mask-wearing is indirect: bone inlay from tomb 1001 at Xibeigang, from which a hollow wood-carved animal mask some 3.2 m (10 ft) long has been reconstructed.)

Allan accepts that the late taotie acquires a mask-like appearance, its face marked off from the adjoining bodies, and credits the mask reading to Jordan Paper as well as to Childs-Johnson, but objects that the development runs the wrong way: a mask cannot have been the origin of the motif, because only in the later stages of its development is the face clearly separated from the body. The taotie also appears on war helmets, where it may signify the supernatural power of the warrior or the power of death he holds, but cannot imply a shamanic trance.

Didier, by contrast, reads the face as a projection of the north celestial pole, identifying its eyes, meridian, horns and squared mouth with particular circumpolar stars, and the leiwen spirals around it with the surrounding star field. On his account the faces are those of the royal ancestors who inhabit the polar square, as are the graphs di and ding; the taotie almost always occupies a rectangular field on the side of a vessel, and on fangding the field is sometimes left empty.

A minority position denies that the motif carried any meaning at all. The art historian Max Loehr set out in 1953 to demonstrate five decorative styles of the Anyang period and to establish their relative order, arguing that such an investigation "cannot be conducted on the basis of the motifs alone" but must weigh the shape of a vessel, the form and arrangement of its ornament, and its technical character together. His formal argument is chronological throughout and does not discuss what the ornament might have meant. He stated the stronger position elsewhere, arguing that if the ornaments "came into being as sheer design, form based on form alone", they "cannot have had any ascertainable meaning – religious, cosmological or mythological", and that scholars "must renounce attempts to explain these elusive images in terms of cosmology or religious lore". (Note: Allan notes that Loehr qualifies the claim: the meaning he rules out is "meaning at any rate of an established literary kind". She reads him as nonetheless implying that the ornament was "iconographically meaningless, or meaningful only as pure form", and traces his theoretical basis to Susanne Langer's principle that "form is first, and the representational function accrues to it".) Bagley likewise questions whether symbolic meaning is needed to explain Shang bronze decoration at all, treating its development as a matter of foundry practice and formal evolution. Against this, even granting that form came first, "it does not follow that the motifs once developed were meaningless"; Langer herself treats art as concerned with visual representation, and even the earliest examples of Loehr's Style I are dominated by two eyes and the suggestion of an animal face, eyes being in themselves a powerful image of unknowable power, so that the imagery is "more than simply ornament". The position is described as no longer widely held. (Note: Loehr himself warned that the styles overlap rather than succeeding one another cleanly, observing that Style I "lives on in the period of Style II without becoming obsolete" and that the repertory of motifs widened continually, older forms persisting beside new ones.) Something of its explanatory force survives in technical arguments: the decoration of a vessel was laid out in units corresponding to the sections of its mould, so that the shape of the design is in part a consequence of how it was made.

Ladislav Kesner proposes that the question itself is misframed, the useful question being not what the motif represents but "how could these images have been meaningful to the Shang people". On this view the mask communicated "directly through the forms, rather than by iconography", its meanings were plural and differed between social strata, and its principal function was ideological – intensifying the statements of hierarchy made by ritual objects and actions – though not by deliberate design on the part of Shang elites.

=== Other motifs ===
Besides the mask, Shang bronzes carry a one-legged dragon named kui by Song antiquarians, and a range of real and composite creatures including birds, cicadas, snakes, tigers, elephants and deer. Where an animal cannot be identified with a real species or with one of the named mythological types, antiquarian usage has generally called it a dragon. The primary allusions of these creatures are to transformations of state – the cicada emerging winged from its pupa, the snake sloughing its skin, the deer shedding its antlers – the cicada and the snake in particular being read as symbols of metamorphosis. The owl is both a night bird and a bird of prey, an omen of death in many traditions including later Chinese folklore, and therefore a fitting decoration for vessels meant to feast the dead – an answer to the puzzle of why an unlucky bird should be cast in bronze and buried. (Note: On the owl zun from the Tomb of Fu Hao the realism is contradicted in the usual way: snakes form part of the wings, a second owl face sits above the tail surmounted by a taotie, and a bird followed by a dragon perches on the head.) The hare, elephant and rhinoceros are rendered comparatively realistically; all were hunted by the king, a further allusion to killing and sacrifice, and elephants were among the animals buried sacrificially at Yinxu.

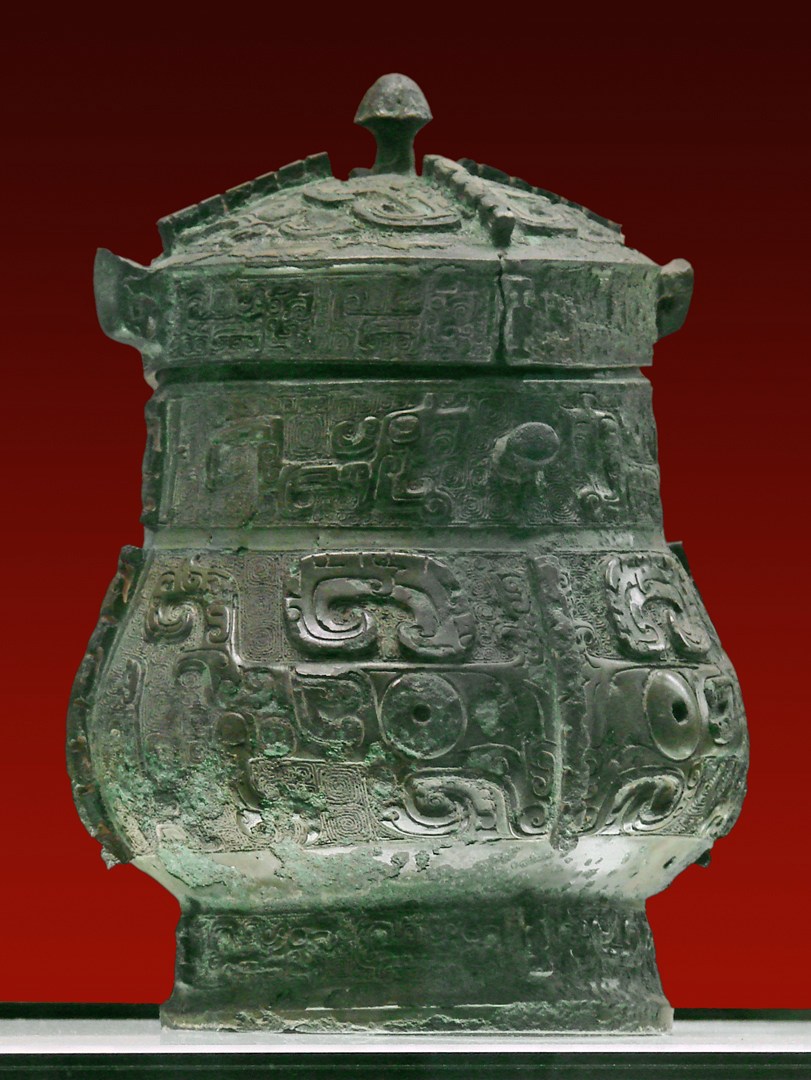
The you in the Cernuschi Museum, Paris. The figure has been read as a shaman embraced rather than devoured; the open mouth has also been interpreted as the passage of death.

A small group of objects combines a human figure with an animal, usually a tiger, with the human head placed below or between the animal's open jaws. The best known are a pair of closely similar you vessels in Paris and Kyoto; the motif also occurs on a yue axe from the Tomb of Fu Hao. Early readings took the animal to be devouring the man. On one interpretation the figure instead embraces the beast, the open mouth being a passage between worlds and the human figure a shaman assisted in crossing it. On another the open mouth signifies passage, but of death rather than of shamanic flight: such axes were used to execute sacrificial victims, and where the first reading takes the man for a wu sorcerer, the motif's placement above the blade of a yue is taken to point instead to death, the figure, if it has a specific referent at all, being more likely the shi (尸), the ritual impersonator of the dead, whose oracle bone graph shows the same raised-knee posture. On this second reading the tiger is the man-eater of Chinese tradition, and Walter Burkert's observation that the animal of prey is also the supreme animal of sacrifice equates eating with sacrificial beheading, the art alluding to sacrifice without illustrating it. A parallel version substitutes a bird for the man, which may carry the same sense given the Shang identification of their rulers with the sun-birds. Neither you was scientifically excavated, but tradition and style suggest both come from the south, probably Hunan.

The Shang traced their own descent from a black bird (玄鳥; xuánniǎo), which has been identified with the sun-birds of the ten-suns myth and read as evidence that the royal group stood in a totemic relation to the suns. The argument is textual rather than art-historical, but one material confirmation has been adduced: dedications on a bronze vessel to a "Black Bird Lady", which show the myth to be authentically Shang rather than a later construction. The identity of the bird is unsettled, having been read as a swallow, as a phoenix and as a crow. Bird designs on bronzes cluster late – the small-bird and large-bird patterns belong to the late Yinxu and early Western Zhou periods, the first group coming largely from the Tomb of Fu Hao – although carved and painted bird images are far older. A sceptical position has also been reported: drawing on Ma Chengyuan's study of bird designs cast on Shang bronzes and their slight role in the early Yinxu period, it has been argued that the Shang bird cult may be an illusion created by modern scholarship.

Reading named creatures back onto the bronzes has correspondingly been treated with caution. Song scholars identified the kui with a dragon motif common on Shang vessels, but no early text associates the character with that motif, and kui is itself rare in early texts. The contrast with taotie is exact: that term at least was applied to bronze decoration in the third century BC, whereas the use of kui dates only from the Song. Since the creature is shown in profile with a single visible leg, it cannot be known whether one or two were intended, and because birds often replace the kui and the kui frequently carries a bird's beak, such creatures "are as much birds as they are dragons".

The long-bodied dragon has been interpreted as a creature of the watery underworld of the Yellow Springs, a reading grounded in its serpent body and in its placement: dragons and turtles occur in the bowls of pan water basins and coiled on the undersides of vessels. The curled "bottle horns" of this dragon have been taken, following J. Leroy Davidson, for deer horns before the antlers grow or after they are shed, antlers being shed and regrown annually and so a natural emblem of rebirth.

=== Colour ===
Eight basic colour terms have been identified in the oracle bone inscriptions: chi (赤, red), xing (骍, red-yellow), bai (白, white), wu (物, multicolour), zhi (brown), huang (黃, yellow), hei (黑, black) and you (幽, dark-red). They function adjectivally, and are applied above all to ritual animals, which Wang Tao suggests may have served the Shang as the model for colour naming in general. (Note: Tao treats zhi as the least secure of the eight, and notes that qing (青), green or blue, occurs in the inscriptions but never as a colour term.)

The colour of a sacrificial victim was a routine subject of divination, often in paired or successive charges proposing one colour against another. White animals were offered to the most senior ancestors, among them Wang Hai and Da Jia, and white boars appear in exorcism and fertility rites; white millet was likewise the preferred offering. Yellow oxen, accompanied by dogs of dark colour, were offered to the four directions and to earthly spirits including the Mother of the East and Mother of the West. In rain-making rites black and white sheep were explicitly contrasted. It is noted that no scheme linking colours to the cardinal directions in the manner of the later Five Phases theory can be read back into the Shang.

Tao also traces a change across the Yinxu period. Multicoloured animals, prominent in the earlier diviner groups, come to be avoided in the later ones, while xing red-yellow rises to become the most frequent and most favoured colour in ancestral sacrifice – suggesting that reddish colours had acquired a particularly favourable set of meanings by the end of the dynasty.

In the non-kings' diviner groups and in the Huayuanzhuang inscriptions the practice is broadly consistent with the kings' but wider in range, black and dark-red animals being used in ancestral sacrifice alongside white and multicoloured ones. In the Wuming group colour becomes the subject of the divination in its own right, the diviner choosing between black, red-yellow, dark-red and yellow oxen; the requirement, as Wang puts it, "is not for a particular animal but for a particular colour". The shift from white to red is the most significant change of the period, and the Shang valuation of white has been compared with Victor Turner's account of white in Ndembu ritual, where it carries notions of purity, continuity, legitimacy and contact with ancestral spirits. He further argues that the Shang scheme laid the foundation for later correlative thinking and that the Five Phases colour categories may derive from it, following Allan, who holds that the growth of a literary tradition under the Zhou led oppositions implicit in Shang thought to be recognised and made explicit, so that correlative thinking "was not abandoned, but systematized and made into a seemingly scientific system".

The use of colour on objects appears to have been an embellishment of Shang ritual, with the particular combination of red and black seen as embodying mystical, magical, and cosmological essence. Main colourants include lacquer, from which came paintings that adorn coffins of kings and even those of Shang military leaders stationed faraway from royal centres. Red and black pigments also seem to have been applied to divination, either as written by brushes or filled in carved characters. Cinnabar, another main colourant that produced red shades, was used to fill in bone cracks and graphs, such as in the case of Huayuanzhuang lineage divinations.

=== Change over time ===
Childs-Johnson describes Shang imagery as passing through four stages: formulation in the Early Shang, development in the Middle Shang, classical expression under Wu Ding, Zu Geng and Zu Jia, and dissolution in the last reigns, when it disintegrates into a zoomorphic assemblage without the earlier rigour. Kesner cautions against reading Loehr's sequence of five decorative styles as a simple line of descent, treating it instead as a spectrum; the assumed priority of Style I over Style II has also been revised. The objection has a sharper form: because the elaborate Style V already dominates the bronzes cast for Fu Hao in the early Anyang period, Loehr's scheme is unsound as a chronology and is valuable only as a system of stylistic classification, the choice among the later styles depending on the preferences of artists and patrons and on the resources they were willing to commit.

=== Regional variation ===
Objects of Shang type are found well beyond Anyang, and beside them stand local traditions that used the same media to different ends. Secondary centres within the Shang sphere shared the material culture of the capital and are identified for the most part by tombs furnished with bronze vessels and weapons; some may have been settled by elites who had moved out from Anyang or Zhengzhou, while others were strongholds of local groups whose relations with the Shang king cannot be read off from the objects. Divination was practised outside the capital as well, as fourteen inscribed oracle shells from Daxinzhuang in Shandong attest.

Further south lay bronze-using societies beyond any plausible reach of Shang control, which had grown up in response to the earlier expansion of the Erligang culture. A deposit found in 1989 at Dayangzhou in Jiangxi held some 1,900 objects, among them 480 bronze vessels and weapons, cast on northern models but hybridised – proportions distorted, ornament dense, and three-dimensional tigers set over the handles of many vessels. The two sacrificial pits at Sanxingdui, roughly contemporary with Late Shang Anyang, held hundreds of bronzes and jades and hundreds of elephant tusks, burnt before burial and in places partly melted; among them were a life-size human figure 172 cm (68 in) tall standing on a base cast with it, dozens of bronze heads whose bodies were probably of wood, and a bronze tree 396 cm (156 in) high. The exaggerated eyes of the heads have been read as a feature of local belief, and the religious system behind the deposit was not that of the Shang, although vessels modelled on Shang types occur in the pits. In the Lower Ordos to the north, local bronzes include hu and gui of distinctive design and weapons whose hilts were cast as horses or snakes, and locally made vessels were buried paired with pieces that may have come from the Shang.

== Music and dance ==
Kin-Woon Tong found no inscription that verifies music or dance being performed for entertainment; every relevant inscription relates performance to a religious function, though matters not needing divination would not have been recorded. The hu music associated with Tang was taken over by the Zhou after the conquest.

=== Music ===
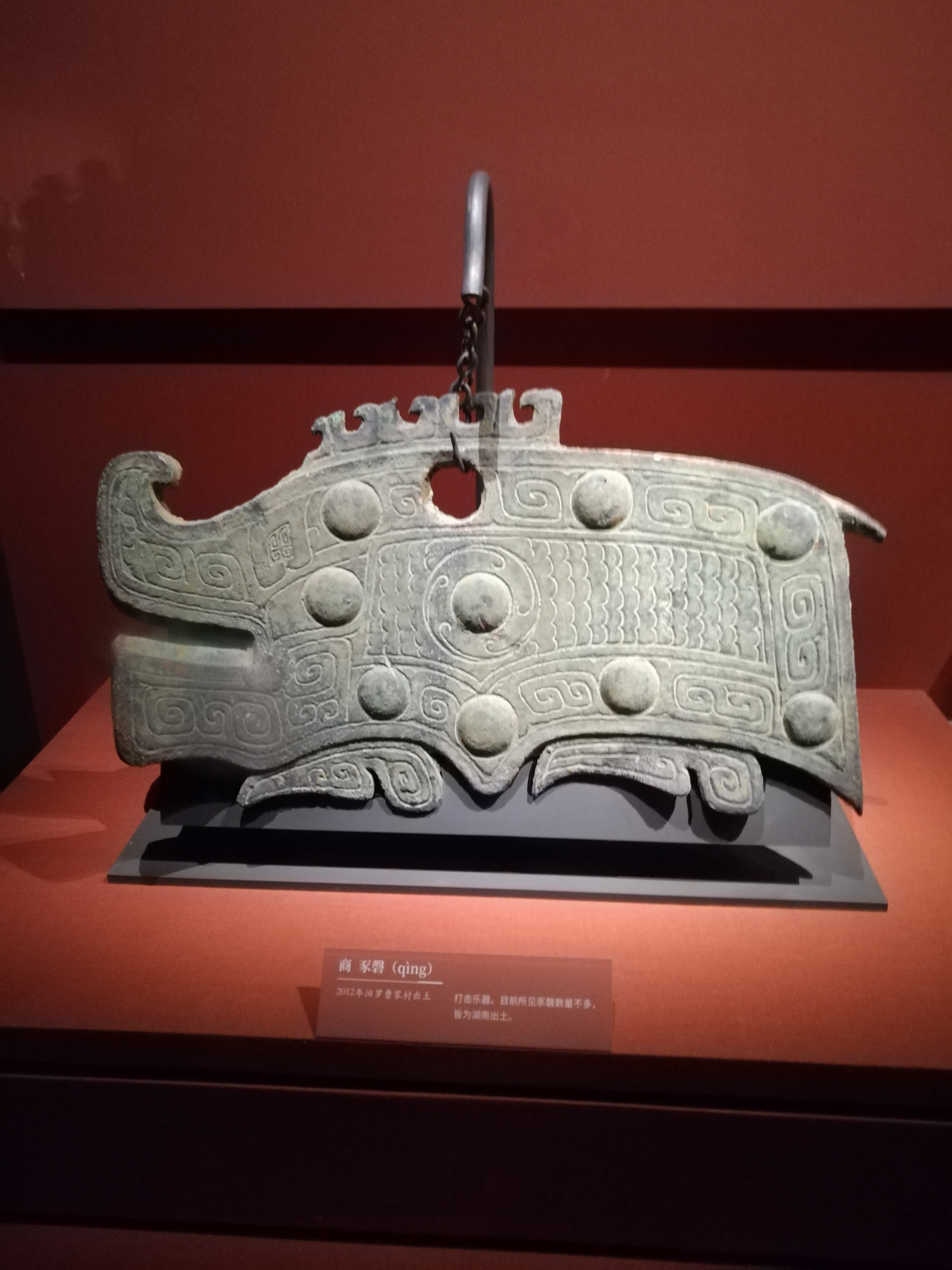
Stone qing in the form of a pig, Hunan Museum

A Late Shang musical set combined bells, alligator-skin drums and chimestones. Large chimestones from the royal tombs at Yinxu were engraved with tiger or dragon designs and painted with vermillion, and chimestones in sets of three or five were often displayed with a large alligator-skin drum in elite tombs at Yinxu and its outposts; large suspended bells were struck in palatial settings or ancestral temples. (Note: Smaller bells remained portable: one of the human victims in the Hougang sacrificial pit wore an armband carrying a bronze bell and forty-five cowrie shells.) Late Shang instruments were themselves often decorated, chiefly with the animal-mask motif. Shang inscriptions mention instrumental music played during sacrificial rituals.

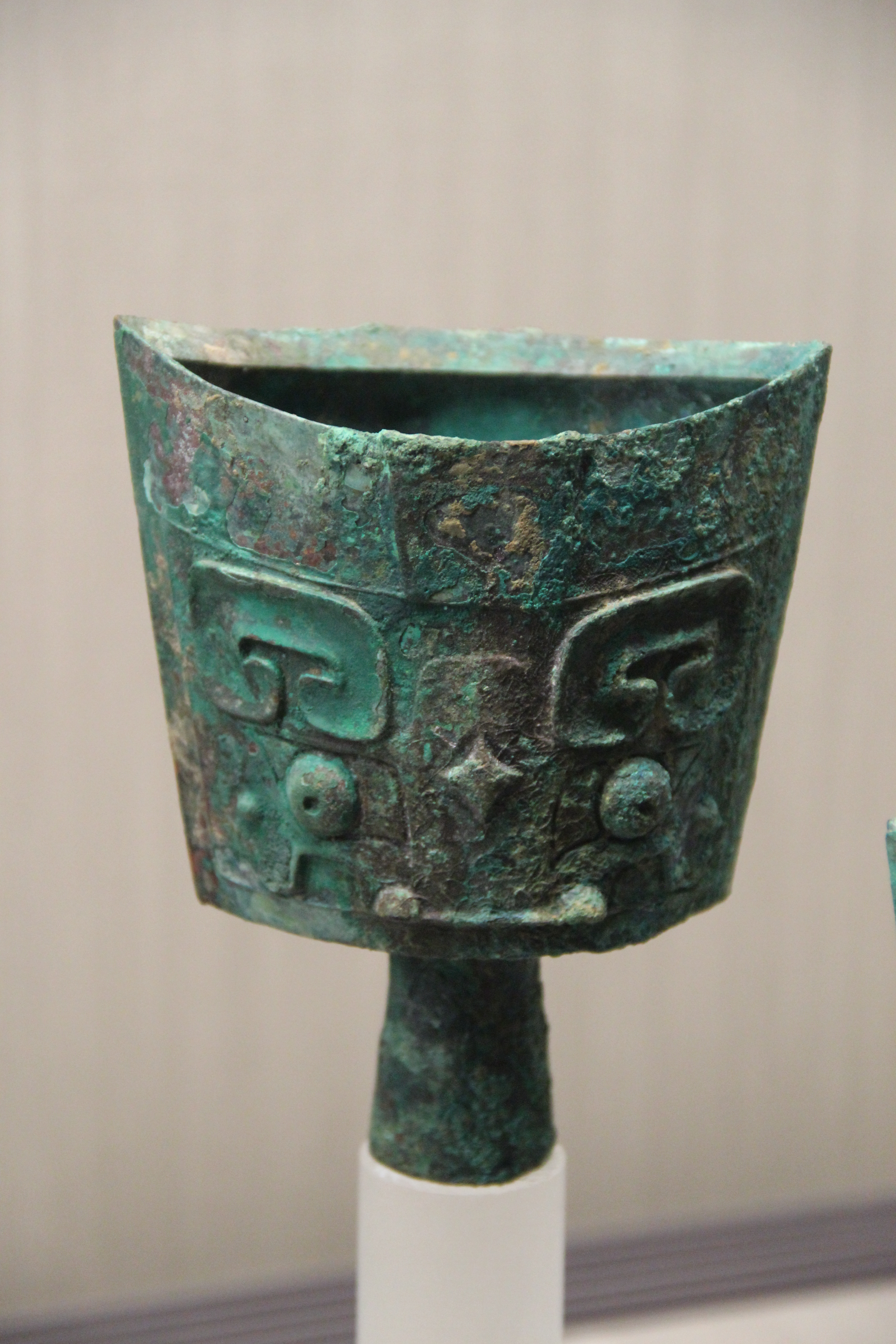
Late Shang bronze nao bell, of the type set mouth upward on a shaft rather than suspended

Oracle bone inscriptions supply a substantial vocabulary of performance. Eleven graphs carry the sense "to perform", most of them incorporating the hand radical, alongside graphs identified as denoting the pole drum, clapper drum, large drum, shang bells, vertical flute, small and large mouth organs and possibly stringed instruments. In one variant of the graph meaning "to set up (instruments)" the radical for an ancestral tablet is added, indicating that the instruments were being set up for religious purposes.

The qing (磬), a suspended stone struck as a percussion instrument, is attested from before the Shang: single examples have been excavated at Dongxiafeng in Shanxi and at Erlitou, both unpolished and undecorated. Tong argued that the instrument developed from the triangular stone ploughshare and that it began as a signal instrument rather than a musical one. (Note: Tong reads the oracle bone graph chen (辰), "time", as showing a person reaching up with both hands to strike a suspended triangular stone, and derives from it a family of meanings including "to strike", "to perform", "to wake" and "to be terrified".) Shang examples are more finely worked and some are decorated: a large qing from Wuguancun bears an incised tiger with open mouth, another from Xiaotun a tiger with a fish-like tail, and one from the Tomb of Fu Hao a standing owl. A second stone from that tomb carries a four-graph inscription recording that it was presented as an offering. One inscription asks whether, at the temple of Mother Xin, the qing should be played and singing performed together with an offering of wine. Single instruments (te-qing) predominate, but three Late Shang sets (bian-qing) of three and five stones are known. Instruments are confined to richly furnished graves; in one late Shang cemetery of 939 burials west of Xiaotun, only two contained qing, and the owner of the set of five was buried with 93 bronzes.

Where only one oracle bone graph had previously been read as the name of a drum, seven more have been identified and five types distinguished, apparently all two-headed: a barrel drum on a low stand, a second of similar shape, a large drum (feng), a clapper drum with a bead suspended on either side, and a pole drum slung horizontally from a pole set into a stand. The remains of a wooden drum from tomb M1217 at Xibeigang, conventionally taken for a barrel drum, have been reidentified as a pole drum.

Only two Shang drums survive, both of bronze and both probably imitating wooden originals. The earlier, found on a river bank at Chongyang in Hubei in 1977 and dated to about the fifteenth or fourteenth century BC, stands 75.5 cm (29.7 in) high and carries taotie designs across its sides and stand, with a saddle-shaped element on top. The later, of uncertain provenance and now in the Sumitomo collection, bears a human head with round eyes and open mouth on each side, a body decorated chiefly with taotie and with a fish pattern above four animal-head feet, and two birds set back to back on top. (Note: A taotie appears inverted on one of the drums.) The heavy taotie ornament of both marks their connection with the Shang ruling class; whether the birds are decorative or carry meaning is uncertain.

The drum served religious and military purposes alike, and a graph read as "alarming news" shows it used to signal danger. Tong argued that the Zhou graph for "rites" (禮) is the same as the graph for the large drum, the pictograph acquiring that sense because the instrument was used to conduct major ceremonies. He connected the Shang drum with the later nuo (儺) exorcism and with the tradition of the Yellow Emperor's drums covered in the hide of the kui (夔), taking the instrument to have been understood as bright, powerful and able to control demons.

Divinations concern not only whether music should be performed but which instruments to use, whether they should be new or old, how many performers were required and on which day the performance would be auspicious. Tong suggested the choice between new and old instruments may have turned on a perceived difference in sacredness, and connected it to the later practice of xin, smearing the blood of cattle or of a captive on new drums and bells. Performances are recorded in the sacrificial room and at temple doors, and are addressed to named ancestors – among them Da Yi, Zu Yi, Zu Ding, Zu Xin and Xiao Yi – as well as to the River Power. The king is himself recorded as playing the flute and the bells. Music also accompanied sacrificial killing: one inscription asks whether the pole drum and the drum should be set up at a killing-sacrifice, and another sets up the shao feast at a shrine together with an offering of Qiang captives. While it cannot be shown that music and dance served religious purposes exclusively, the inscriptions indicate that music was among the chief means of pleasing the gods and ancestors.

=== Dance ===
Dance was an integral part of the Shang religion, with a degree of significance possibly greater than commonly perceived. The Shang incorporated their dynastic name into the name of one particular dance ritual, suggesting that dancing was an alternative way for them, especially before the appearance of oracle bone inscriptions, to represent their religion. In addition, dances were possibly associated with the zoomorphic motifs in Shang ritual art, and possibly also with the wu mediums.

Several distinct dances have been identified in the inscriptions. Graphs have been read as denoting a feather dance (mei), in which the dancer is shown with feathers on the head; a rain dance (wu); a military dance (zhi) performed with a flute and a ge halberd; and the bin, a dance performed to welcome the spirits of ancestors. Further graphs may represent a flag dance and a dance with long axes, though the readings are more tentative. Instrumental music and dance were closely connected: one inscription asks whether the dancers should perform the pole drum, and dancers appear as a distinct class of performers about whom the king divined. Feathers were the commonest property of sacrificial dances performed to beg for rain and good harvest.

== Food and perception ==
The Shang considered sacrificial animals such as cattle to be preferable food, possibly because eating them helped to forge closer connections with the ancestors who were thought to consume the same food. Scholars disagree on whether the Shang practised ritual cannibalism by eating sacrificial humans, or such acts were prohibited.

Cattle were the favoured meat of Shang elites and the commonest sacrificial offering, and Yitzchak Jaffe and Roderick Campbell argue that because they were consumed by both the living and the dead their shared consumption "formed a bond between humanity and the spirits", blurring any clear division between ritual and everyday use. On their reading the significant Shang distinction is not between human and animal but between wild and domesticated beings: wild animals were hunted and eaten by elites but almost never sacrificed, while domestic animals and human captives, as products of the civilised realm, were offered to the spirits. Ancestors thus consumed humans through sacrifice, in a way the living did not. The sacrificial meat of large animals was probably shared widely, so that ritual and everyday consumption cannot be separated at Anyang at all: cattle were at once the favoured food of elites, human and spirit alike, and "the widely shared aliment of sacrificial feasts". Food taboos ran from the unthinkable to the unremarkable and were contextual rather than absolute.

They extend the argument to the imagery on the vessels used in those meals. Noting that the taotie commonly combines a gaping fanged mouth with the horns of a herbivore, they contend that the motif cannot be a depiction of the sacrificial animal, as Allan and Chang proposed, because the creatures most prominent in Shang art – buffalo, tigers, horned owls, elephants, deer – were not sacrificed; the fanged mouth instead indexes predatory consumption, and the zoomorphs manifest "the wild, liminal, life-taking powers of the spirits". The position being argued against is Allan's own, stated directly: although the taotie is not representational, it alludes to real creatures – the buffalo or ox, sheep, possibly the goat, deer and tiger – "all of which were used in sacrifice", and in its more explicit forms the animals it invokes reinforce the theme of eating, since all were used in ritual sacrifice, the human being included. The two accounts disagree on the underlying fact of which animals the Shang sacrificed.

Residue analysis of a lidded he vessel from a tomb at Yinxu indicated a C4 plant, presumably millet, as a principal ingredient, consistent with textual references to a flavoured millet ale used on ritual occasions. (Note: Childs-Johnson argues that jiu (酒) in Shang and Zhou contexts should be rendered "fermented beverage" rather than "wine", since it was brewed chiefly from millet rather than grapes, and cites the fermenting installation excavated at Taixi in support.) Separately, storage jars from a Shang brewery at Taixi, some 125 km (78 mi) north of Anyang, yielded fruit stones together with seeds of sweet clover, jasmine and cannabis. Following Chang, Li Min has proposed that the elaboration of drinking vessels and the proliferation of fantastic bronze iconography belonged to a single ritual tradition, and that the motifs were meant to be seen under altered states of consciousness. The proposal is offered as a suggestion rather than a finding, and residue analysis of Shang vessels remains scarce.

== Architecture ==
=== Early and Middle Shang ===
Sacral architecture – also called religious architecture – existed as early as the first phase of the Shang, with ritual constructions identified within both the Early-period settlements at Zhengzhou and Yanshi (Henan province) and the Middle-period centre of Xiaoshuangqiao. At Yanshi, extensive sacrificial remains were documented in a walled compound set aside for ritual activity, and at Zhengzhou a ritual feature built from a large raised rock ringed by smaller stones, aligned with the city's palaces and walls, was associated with eight pits holding the remains of ninety-two sacrificed dogs. At Zhengzhou, dozens of rammed-earth platforms have been described as forming a palace and ancestral-temple complex, although the two foundations excavated there in detail have been assigned residential and administrative rather than ritual functions.

The Middle Shang centre at Xiaoshuangqiao, some 20 km (12 mi) northwest of Zhengzhou, has yielded the clearest evidence. About ten rammed-earth platforms stand at the centre of the site; sacrificial remains beside them suggest a building associated with an ancestral temple, and one raised platform measuring 50 by 40 m (160 by 130 ft) and standing more than 12 m (39 ft) high appears to have served as a large altar for royal sacrifice. The site's sacrificial remains include a sacrificial field, pits of human and animal victims, pits of ox heads and of ox horns, and traces of burnt offering (liao, 燎); The predominance of direct burial in the soil has been taken to indicate offerings made to a spirit of the soil and the ground. Characters written with a brush dipped in cinnabar have been found on ceramic jars within the sacrificial area, in a style continuous with the later oracle bone script.

At Huanbei, a large platform with sacrificial pits before its main hall and side rooms, and sacrificed dogs within the main chamber, has been identified as very possibly an ancestral temple. Shang practice commonly combined the foundation used for administration with the ancestral temple used for ceremonial rites in a single building.

Major structures were laid out close to, but not exactly on, the cardinal directions, and the deviation changes sign over time: the two palace foundations at Erlitou face some five to eight degrees west of true north, while the city walls at Zhengzhou face about eight degrees east of it, as do the royal tombs at Xibeigang, which lie between four and ten degrees east. Both David Pankenier and Didier attribute the orientation to observation of the celestial pole. They differ over the shift: Pankenier reads it as a change of pole star, from Thuban to Kochab, whereas Didier argues that it tracks Thuban's own drift away from true north, so that the builders continued to aim at the same star throughout. Didier further suggests that the cruciform plan of the Xibeigang tombs – a square chamber with a ramp on each side – was meant to escort the royal dead from an earthly quadrilateral to the polar one, and on that ground rejects Allan's reading of the same plan as the graph ya (亞) and so as an image of the four fang. Allan's own account is that the Shang conceived the earth as cross-shaped, a central square surrounded by four quadrants in the cardinal directions, and that this shape was replicated in the royal tombs so that the dead might pass freely to the other world – the turtle plastron used in divination, domed above and with legs at the four corners, representing the same cosmos. (Note: Didier notes that Keightley treats the alignments more cautiously, as an instance of a habit of orienting burials to or near the cardinal directions that is attested across proto-Chinese cultures from the Neolithic onward.)

=== Yinxu ===
The Late Shang royal centre at Xiaotun stood on high ground some 79 m (259 ft) above sea level, overlooking the Huan River. Childs-Johnson divides it into four loci named for the first four Heavenly Stems: Locus Jia, at the north, residential and palatial, partly on the negative evidence that it lacks the animal and human sacrifice found in the sections further south; Locus Yi, the largest at some 20,000 m^{2} (220,000 sq ft), the ritual centre; Locus Bing, to the south and west, a smaller ritual area about a tenth the size of Yi; and Locus Ding, formerly known as Huayuanzhuang East, mixed in function.

The distinction may be a modern imposition. Divination, the granting of awards and ancestral offerings are all attested in the residential quarters, which has been taken to corroborate the view that "religio-ritual and administration were not distinguished by location or different architectural forms". The offering of human and animal sacrifices when a building was raised was in any case characteristic of Shang construction generally, and so does not by itself mark a structure as religious.

In oracle bone inscriptions, temples (宗; zōng) are generally described as including elevated halls (堂; táng), courtyards (庭; tíng) and gates (門; mén). Aihe Wang has argued that their design may have been shaped by Shang cosmological principles, in particular the notion of sifang (四方), the four quarters. (Note: Didier disputes Wang's account of the fang, which he quotes as making them the conception "through which the Shang perceived the will of Di". He holds that they were not the exclusive agents of Di's beneficence, that they are better understood as one component of Di among others, and that Wang overstates their role in Shang religion.) Didier instead derives the square ritual spaces of the Shang world – the shrine housing a square altar, the altar itself, and the walled enclosure around them – from the polar quadrilateral he identifies behind the graph ding (口), and endorses Li Lixin's proposal that the concentric square plan of palace foundation 1 at Huanbei reproduces that graph. (Note: Didier holds elsewhere that the Shang did not use 口 to write "temple", but only a hunting ground or a royal palace.) There were temples to the Former Lords and to the Nature Powers, temples named for individual kings beginning with Da Yi, a small number for royal consorts, and joint temples in which groups of ancestors received cult. Only kings on the main line of descent were honoured with temples maintained across generations; those named for collateral kings were rarely recorded and were evidently dismantled after a period. Each ancestor was commemorated by a spirit tablet housed in a temple, though few if any archaeological remains of such tablets have been found, most having probably been of wood.

At Locus Yi a raised rectangular platform carried a square open-air altar, Yi 1, built of differently coloured rammed earth and surviving to about 11 m × 12 m (36 ft × 39 ft), with no trace of walls or postholes. It was approached from the south along a bridge over a bracket-shaped pool, then through courtyards and between two long colonnaded halls. Because it stood unroofed and fully exposed, it has been read either as an outdoor beng (祊) altar – known from inscriptions as a place of sacrifice to spirits ranging from Di to the River Power and the ancestors – or as an altar to the local earth god (she, 社). Smaller stepped altars at Locus Bing repeat the arrangement at about a tenth of the scale. (Note: Childs-Johnson describes the Bing structures as simulating the Yi complex, but also dates them before the reign of Wu Ding, and therefore earlier than Yi 1 itself.)

Crack-making … pray at Mother Xin's temple, should we play the qing and sing, and offer wine?

— Oracle bone inscription, Qian 1.30.7, in Kin-Woon Tong's rendering

Some elite tombs carried superstructures in the form of columned halls without walls, a further type of religious architecture serving the outdoor worship of the person buried beneath. The hall above Fu Hao's tomb at Xiaotun is identified in oracle bone inscriptions as Mu Xin Zong (母辛宗), the temple of Mother Xin, her posthumous name.

The Yi altar has been placed in a longer tradition of open-air worship, the multicoloured rammed-earth platforms of the Late Neolithic Liangzhu culture in Zhejiang and Jiangsu and the square altars of the Hongshan culture offered as precedents from which the Shang practice may have grown. (Note: "Jade Age" is Childs-Johnson's own term for this horizon rather than standard periodisation.) Li Ji described the altar as built from pure yellow earth, bounded on all sides by pounded earth of a different colour. Locus Yi is separated from the residential Locus Jia not only by a wall and the Yi 1 platform but by an underground store of divinatory texts at Daliankeng, dated to the reign of Wu Ding.

=== Use ===
Access to religious buildings was probably reserved only for the elites. Participation in the ancestral cult itself was apparently restricted to close lineage members, royal consorts, sons and affines. Shang inscriptions suggest that the king routinely prayed to invoke in the temples, assuming a kneeling posture while holding ritual objects in his hands. Areas within the ancestral temple were set apart for offerings, among them those written as the Great Hall and the Blood Hall, and a graph combining the sign for a jue with a roof has been read as denoting a jue wine offering made inside the temple.

Restricted access to buildings did not mean that the imagery itself was seen only by elites. Theriomorphic designs also occur on portable objects in stone, bone and ceramic whose use was not confined to temples, and grave goods stood exposed on the ledges of a tomb until it was closed. Kesner concludes that such imagery "significantly shaped the visual environment encountered by all strata of the Shang population", the more forcibly because that environment was otherwise sparse in visual stimuli.

Access to the bronze vessels themselves was likewise graded. Use of the ding in ritual appears to have been confined to the king and to heirs taking part in the rites. Possession of the monumental tetrapod ding appears to have been the prerogative of kings and of royal sons in the line of succession, while the three-legged round ding was owned across all elite ranks; the monumental vessels have been read as symbols of a divine right to rule granted by Di, and connected to the term yiding, translated as the "metamorphically empowered" tetrapod ding.

== Ritual paraphernalia ==
=== Bronze ===
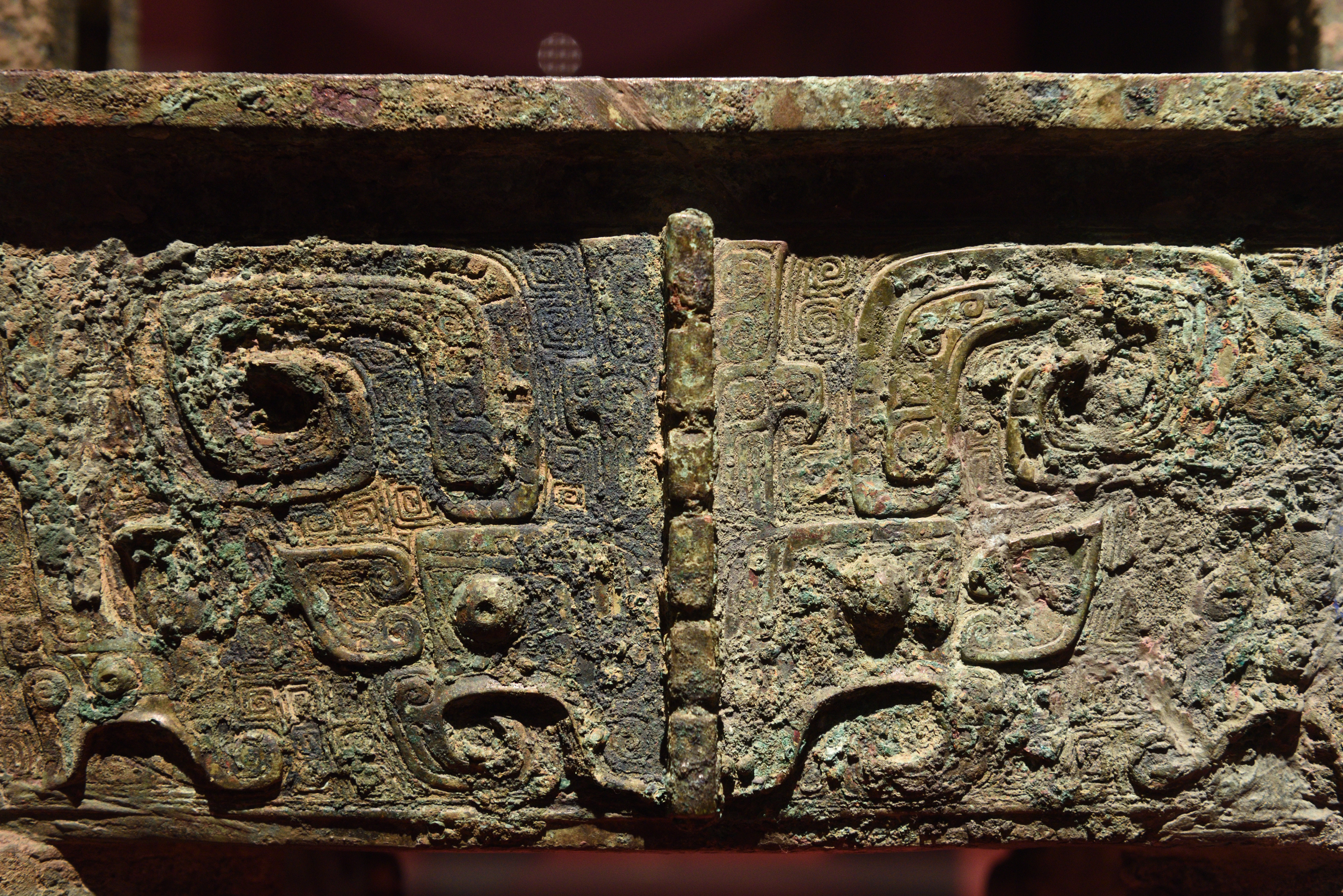
Four-legged fangding from the Tomb of Fu Hao, its legs cast in the form of kui dragons

The Shang inherited a small repertoire of cast ritual vessels from the preceding Erlitou period – the jue beaker, the jia, the he and the tripod ding (鼎) – and expanded it in both range and scale. Erlitou vessels are few and small, that phase being experimental beside the production of the Shang centuries. By the Early Shang the assemblage in use took in the tripod and tetrapod ding, the jue, gu, jia, he, gui, zun, li and you.

The jue is the earliest of the ritual bronze types: its characteristic form is already present in the earliest bronze and ceramic examples, of Early Shang date or before, and it is the most numerous vessel recovered at Xiaotun and in the Dasikongcun cemetery. Possible ceramic prototypes for it have been identified in Late Neolithic, Xia and Early Shang contexts near Nanjing, at Beiyinyangying and Sanliqiao in Jiangsu, and at Xiaopangou and Dongmagou in Henan, the northern examples sharing its three legs, side handle and rounded lip. The vessel was used for pouring wine, and both its name and its three-legged shape suggest a bird: jue is also the name of a small bird, and the oracle bone graph is at once a picture of a bird and of the vessel. The ding was the vessel used to prepare and offer meat sacrifices, and in the inscriptions its graph functions as a verb of sacrifice, with the king as subject, a dead king or queen as indirect object and the offering as object. Vessels of this type were made in three broad size classes: monumental tetrapod ding from 54 to 133 cm (21 to 52 in) in height, medium examples from 21 to 43 cm (8.3 to 16.9 in), and small ones below 21 cm (8.3 in). The largest surviving example, the Hou Mu Wu ding from tomb M260 at Wuguancun, stands 133 cm (52 in) high and weighs 875 kg (1,929 lb). Late Shang casting was technically more ambitious than Erligang work: the vessels made for Fu Hao show a marked preference for square bodies, harder to produce than round ones, and vessels cast as three-dimensional animals and birds – among them the owl zun from her tomb and the man-and-beast you now in Paris – demanded high-precision work.

Not every vessel class held offerings. The pan was a basin for ritual washing, its decoration – dragons or turtles, fish and birds, placed in the bowl or beneath the rim – read as evoking a pond, so that the supplicant was purified and transformed by washing much as the contents of an offering vessel were transformed by the imagery around them.

=== Jade and other materials ===
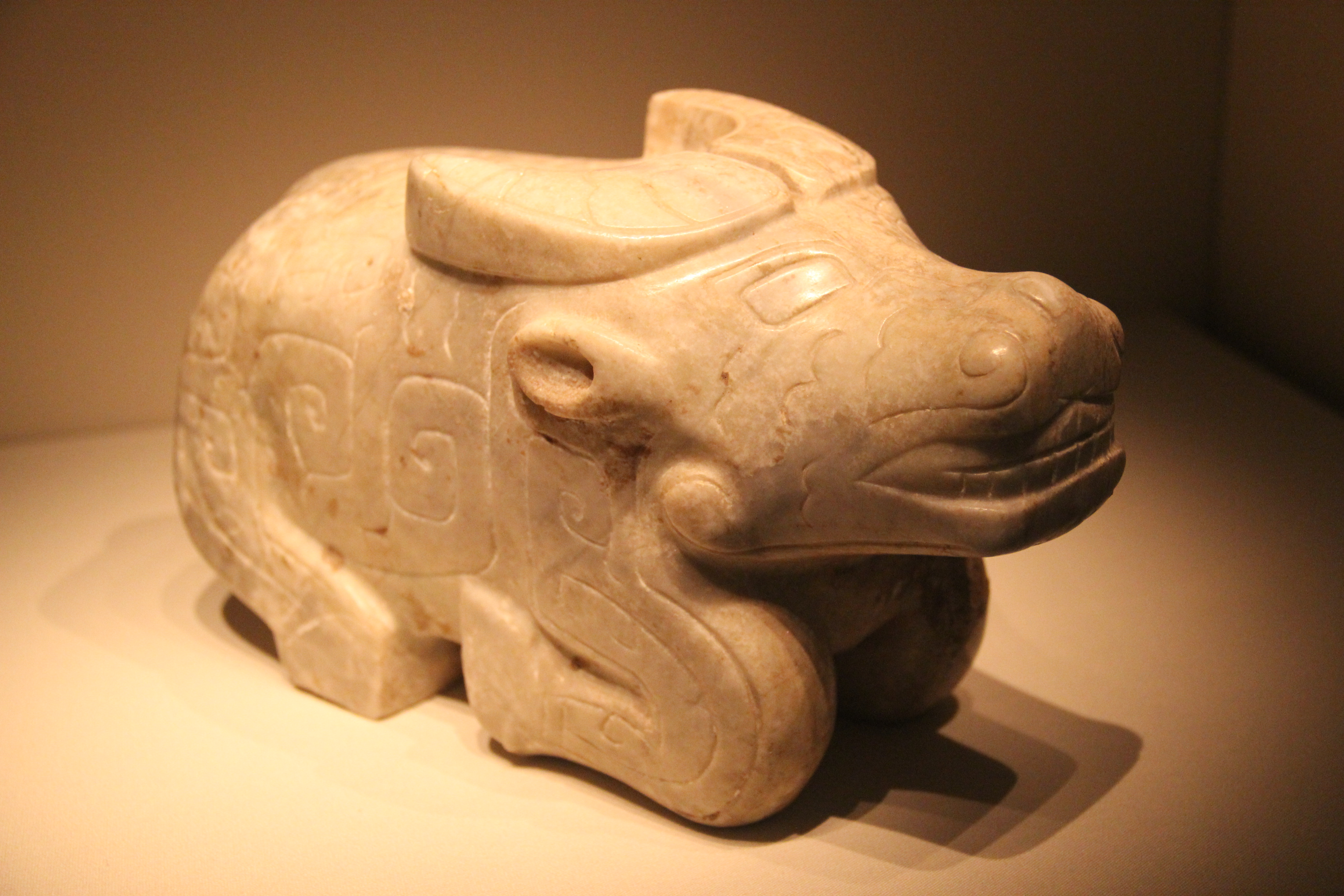
Stone water buffalo from the Tomb of Fu Hao

Non-living sacrificial offerings were mainly bones, stones and bronzes. Some of the bone products were shaped into hairpins or arrowheads, and there are instances of ivory found in elite tombs. Stone objects such as jade were moulded into decorative ritual objects, such as those discovered in the Tomb of Fu Hao. There were also accepted minor materials like ceramics, the designs on which were inherited from earlier cultures. Keightley regarded the Shang kings as heirs to Neolithic and early Bronze Age traditions of religious communication that involved both animal-mask iconography and the use of ritual jades such as the cong tube, though by the Late Shang those traditions had been so routinised that their earlier ecstatic character had been set aside. The registers of animal masks on Liangzhu cong tubes, laid out to a consistent module, have been read as a possible image of the generational hierarchy of the ancestors, each generation given equal space much as each was given equal place in the Late Shang ritual cycle, though the suggestion is offered tentatively.

=== Casting ===
Shang ritual bronzes were cast by the piece-mould, or section-mould, process rather than by lost-wax casting – a distinction established by the Swedish collector Orvar Karlbeck in 1935 – with outer moulds built in segments around a clay model and then reassembled around a core for casting. The decoration of a vessel was laid out in units corresponding to those mould sections, the vertical flanges falling along the seams. Lukas Nickel has argued from this that ornament was carved into the moulds rather than onto the model, which would account both for Shang taotie being rarely mirror-symmetrical and for vessels of identical shape never carrying identical decoration – among them the fifty-three gu beakers from the Tomb of Fu Hao, no two of which are ornamented alike. (Note: Nickel's argument runs against the prevailing view, associated with Noel Barnard and Robert Bagley, that most ornament was executed on the model and transferred to the mould. On that view the flanges were added not to disguise mould marks but to stress the vertical divisions of the ornament, the relentlessly subdivided design reflecting an aesthetic rather than a mould assembly.)

Inscriptions were cast rather than engraved, which meant applying the characters in reverse to the core before the metal was poured. Only a handful of Anyang-period bronze inscriptions, mostly from the later part of the period, give any narrative context; the majority are single-graph marks taken to be family emblems. The same conclusion follows from them as from the ornament: of the fifty-three gu from Fu Hao's tomb, twenty-two carry the two-character inscription "Fu Hao" inside the foot ring, and the characters are strikingly different every time – even among vessels whose cores were of identical size and shape. Foundries of the kind that produced such work have been excavated at Xiaomintun, about 3 km (1.9 mi) west of Xiaotun. A cluster uncovered there in 2003–4, covering 380 by 100 m (1,250 by 330 ft), yielded some 70,000 mould fragments and about a hundred clay models, and is the largest Shang casting site known.

Casting was itself a religious occupation. The primary function of the bronze-casters was the making of vessels for the ancestral cult, and the cult in which those vessels were used was largely practised in conjunction with divination, which called for a comparable mastery of heat; the two crafts have been held to share cosmological and epistemological assumptions, visible alike in their aesthetics and in their mechanisms. Both placed their material symmetrically about a central axis – inscriptions on the plastron, ornament on the vessel – and both kept it within bounds, so that no motif spread beyond its field, much as each royal ancestor was assigned his own jurisdiction and his own place in the ritual schedule. The vessels appear to have been proportioned from modules: a set of gu beakers from tomb M1400 at Xibeigang was laid out from the diameter of the waist, so that vessels of different sizes share the same proportions, the result being an anonymous period style rather than an individual one. Because piece-mould casting required the form of the finished vessel to be settled in the model before any metal was poured, it left little room for individual invention: both the religion and the technology "depended for their effect on the creation and manipulation of relatively standardized components: ancestral personae, clay models, clay molds".

=== Labour ===
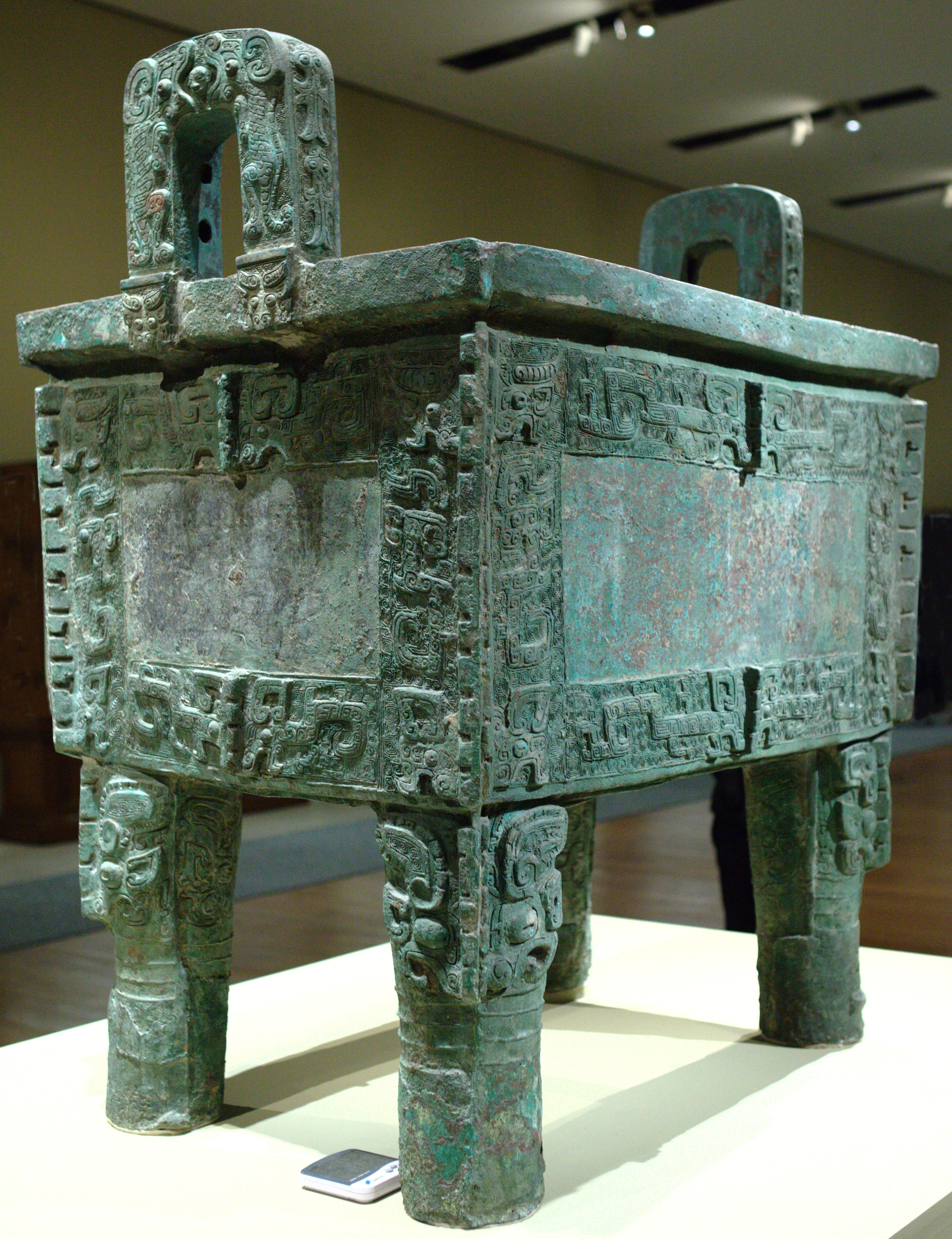
The Hou Mu Wu ding, 875 kg (1,929 lb). Casting it is estimated to have required more than a thousand artisans working at once.

The production of ritual objects consumed labour and materials on a large scale. A thousand tons of bronze is estimated to have been cast in the Yinxu workshops into more than 100,000 vessels, consuming millions of hours of skilled labour and requiring hundreds of thousands of tons of fuel, all of which had to be transported. The metal itself – copper, tin and lead – was mined and smelted at scattered locations, some beyond any plausible reach of direct Shang control. A single object could absorb an extraordinary concentration of effort: given the small furnaces of the Anyang royal workshop, casting the Hou Mu Wu ding has been estimated to have required more than a thousand artisans working simultaneously in an organised production line, not counting those who shaped the clay model and took the moulds from it. That these were state workshops has been disputed, each being instead taken to have been controlled by an internally hierarchical lineage, though the proposal is offered as conjecture from general models of Shang society.

Sacrifice generated its own industries. Elite sacrifice across the roughly two centuries of the Late Shang has been estimated at more than 500,000 head of cattle, 710,000 pigs and 230,000 sheep, figures regarded as certainly too low. Because sacrificial animals are underrepresented in sacrificial pits relative to their frequency in the divinations, much of the meat was probably shared among the living, so that ritual functioned as a mechanism of food redistribution. Cattle scapulae supplied the oracle bones, which have been estimated in the millions for Yinxu alone, and the bone waste from sacrificial consumption fed workshops such as that at Tiesanlu, which produced millions of artefacts. That workshop is estimated to have covered 17,600 m^{2} (189,000 sq ft); a single 10 m (33 ft) trench excavated in 2006 yielded about 34,000 kg (75,000 lb) of processed bone, mostly from large bovines, and its output has been put at 77 objects a day, or more than four million over the 150 years it operated.

A parallel change is visible in what was buried. Much of the population at Yinxu was provided with a basic mortuary assemblage of ceramic gu and jue drinking vessels, a cowry shell or two, a coffin, food offerings and often a dog interred in a pit beneath the coffin. Many of these objects were made specifically for burial: the ceramic gu and jue grew smaller over time, bronzes in lesser elite tombs were cast increasingly thin or with lead substituted for copper and tin, and burnished pottery imitating bronze appears in late-phase tombs. This has been read not as a decline of the ritual economy but as its diversification: fewer complete ritual assemblages were being taken out of circulation while the specialised production of grave goods became a major branch of craft manufacture – a reading supported by the expansion of the bronze foundries in Yinxu's final phases.

== Legacy ==
Ancestor worship remained the foundation of the ritual system after the Shang fall, but its personnel and its imagery changed. Shang royal ancestors gradually disappeared from the sacrificial lists in favour of the Zhou royal line; the familiar animal mask was displaced on bronzes by dragons with spiral tails and feng birds with fanned tail feathers – a motif that had run on Shang and Zhou bronzes for some eight centuries before being given up around the middle of the eighth century BC, at the move east, and the jue and gu fell out of the repertoire as the gui rose in importance. Continuity is nonetheless visible in personnel: most scribes of the early Western Zhou were of Shang descent, and they went on observing sacrifices to their own deceased Shang kinsmen.

The decisive break came later. Jessica Rawson argues that the marked change in vessel casting during the second half of the Western Zhou, long read as artistic and technical decline, was too regular and too purposeful to be decline alone, and was instead driven by a change in ritual practice. Across the period the wine cups inherited from the Shang – the jue, jiao, gu and zhi – were abandoned along with the you and the cylindrical zun; new types such as the large hu, dou, xu and fu were introduced, several of them modelled on ceramic rather than bronze prototypes; a new form of zhong bell arrived from the south; and matched sets of identical ding and gui, nine to eight or seven to six, came to mark rank. She dates the change to the reigns following King Gong, anchoring it on the Zhuangbai hoard and the Shi Qiang pan. The abandonment of the wine vessels recalls the criticism of Shang wine drinking in the Shu jing, whose relevant chapters may have been composed at about the same time. Rawson suggests, while stressing that the suggestion is speculative, that the reform was religious in form and political in motive, prompted by a concern for the cohesion of a weakening state; the new repertory then governed all later casting, older types surviving only in Anhui and Jiangsu.

Shang bronzes were recovered and studied again under the Song dynasty. From the eleventh century antiquarians treated excavated vessels as concrete remnants of the ritual systems of the Shang and Zhou, and Emperor Huizong made that scholarship the basis of a state programme: a Ritual Bureau operating between 1113 and 1120 produced new ritual vessels required to be "correct" in both shape and inscription, modelled on genuine antiquities. The court amassed more than six thousand ancient bronzes, and a contemporary writer reported that tombs and ruins across the country had been plundered until nothing remained. The Xuanhe bogu tu read the ancient ornament allegorically, explaining the taotie as a warning against gluttony.

The copying was nonetheless imperfect in an instructive way. Piece-mould casting had been forgotten with the end of the Bronze Age, and neither the Song antiquarians nor Huizong's artisans knew of it; familiar only with the lost-wax method, they reproduced the regular squares left by casting chaplets as though these were decoration.

The ritual programme extended beyond vessels. Between 1104 and 1105, at the height of the purge of anti-reform conservatives, Huizong's court cast a set of Nine Tripods, designed a new bell set named Dasheng, or Great Brightness, and built the Bright Hall – acts which claimed to revive the golden age of the Three Dynasties through concrete ritual objects and performances. The taste did not extend to ceramics: Ru ware drew on Eastern Zhou, Qin and Han models and never imitated Shang animal ornament.
