= Erligang culture =

Bronze Age culture in China

Coordinates: 34.754°N 113.676°E

- Geographical range: North China Plain
- Period: Bronze Age China
- Dates: c. 1600 – c. 1400 BC
- Type site: Erligang
- Major sites: Zhengzhou, Yanshi, Panlongcheng
- Preceded by: Erlitou culture, Yueshi culture, Xiaqiyuan culture
- Followed by: Xiaoshuangqiao–Huanbei

Chinese name
- Traditional Chinese: 二里崗文化
- Simplified Chinese: 二里岗文化
Transcriptions
Standard Mandarin
- Hanyu Pinyin: Èrlǐgǎng Wénhuà

The Erligang culture ([âɚ.lì.kàŋ]) is a Bronze Age urban civilization and archaeological culture in China that existed from approximately 1600 to 1400 BC. The primary site, Zhengzhou Shang City, was discovered at Erligang, within the modern city of Zhengzhou, Henan, in 1951.

== Major sites ==
The culture was centered in the Yellow River valley. In its early years, it expanded rapidly, reaching the Yangtze River. The culture then gradually shrank from its early peak.

=== Zhengzhou ===
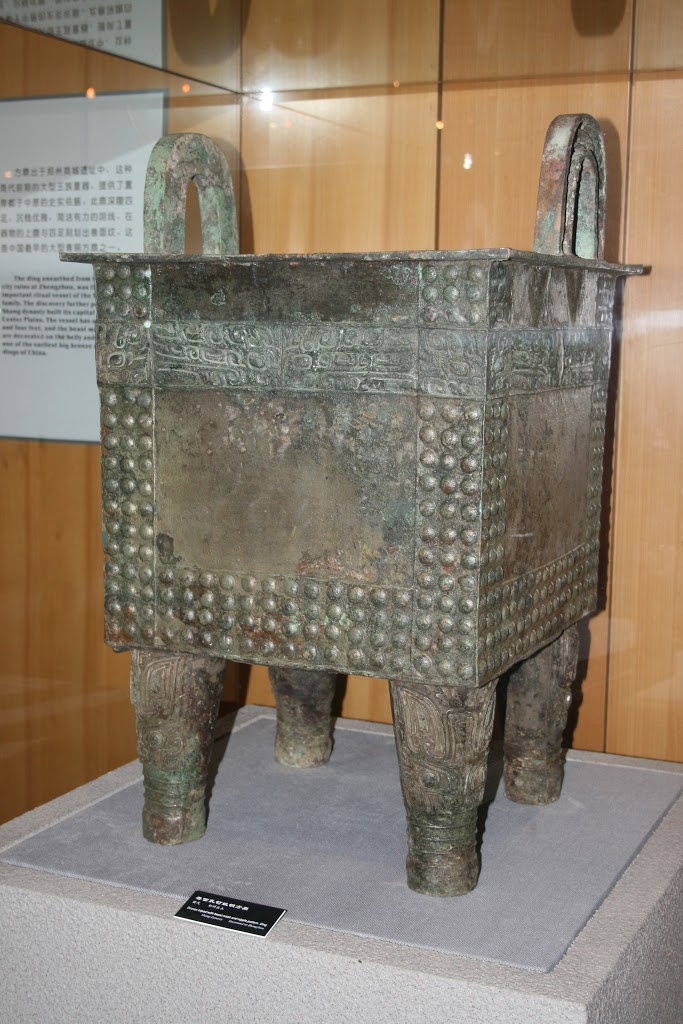
Bronze ding cauldron from the Zhengzhou site

Later investigations showed that the Erligang site was part of an ancient city surrounded by a roughly rectangular wall with a perimeter of about 7 kilometers (4 mi). The walls were of rammed earth construction, a technique dating back to Chinese Neolithic sites of the Longshan culture (c. 3000 – c. 1900 BC). It has been estimated that the walls would have been 20 meters (66 ft) wide at the base, rising to a height of 8 meters (26 ft). Large workshops were located outside the city walls, including a bone workshop, a pottery workshop and two bronze vessel workshops. The modern city sits on the remains of the Erligang city, rendering archaeological excavations impossible. Therefore, most of the information about the culture comes from studying other Erligang sites.

=== Panlongcheng ===
The large site at Panlongcheng, on the Yangtze River in Hubei, is currently the largest excavated site associated with the Erligang culture. It was discovered in 1954, and excavated in 1974 and 1976. Since Zhengzhou lacked local access to copper and tin for making bronze, sites like Panlongcheng were probably used to secure distant metal resources. A large number of bronze wares were found in Panlong City. Through carbon dating of wood samples unearthed from Tonglu Mountain in Dazhi, Hubei and Tongling Mining and Metallurgical Site in Ruichang, Jiangxi, comparisons were made between the bronze wares unearthed in Panlongcheng City and Tonglu Mountain. The mineral elements of Panlongcheng bronzes were found to be the same as those of Tonglushan, which indicates that the copper of Panlongcheng originated from Tonglushan.

== Bronze vessels ==
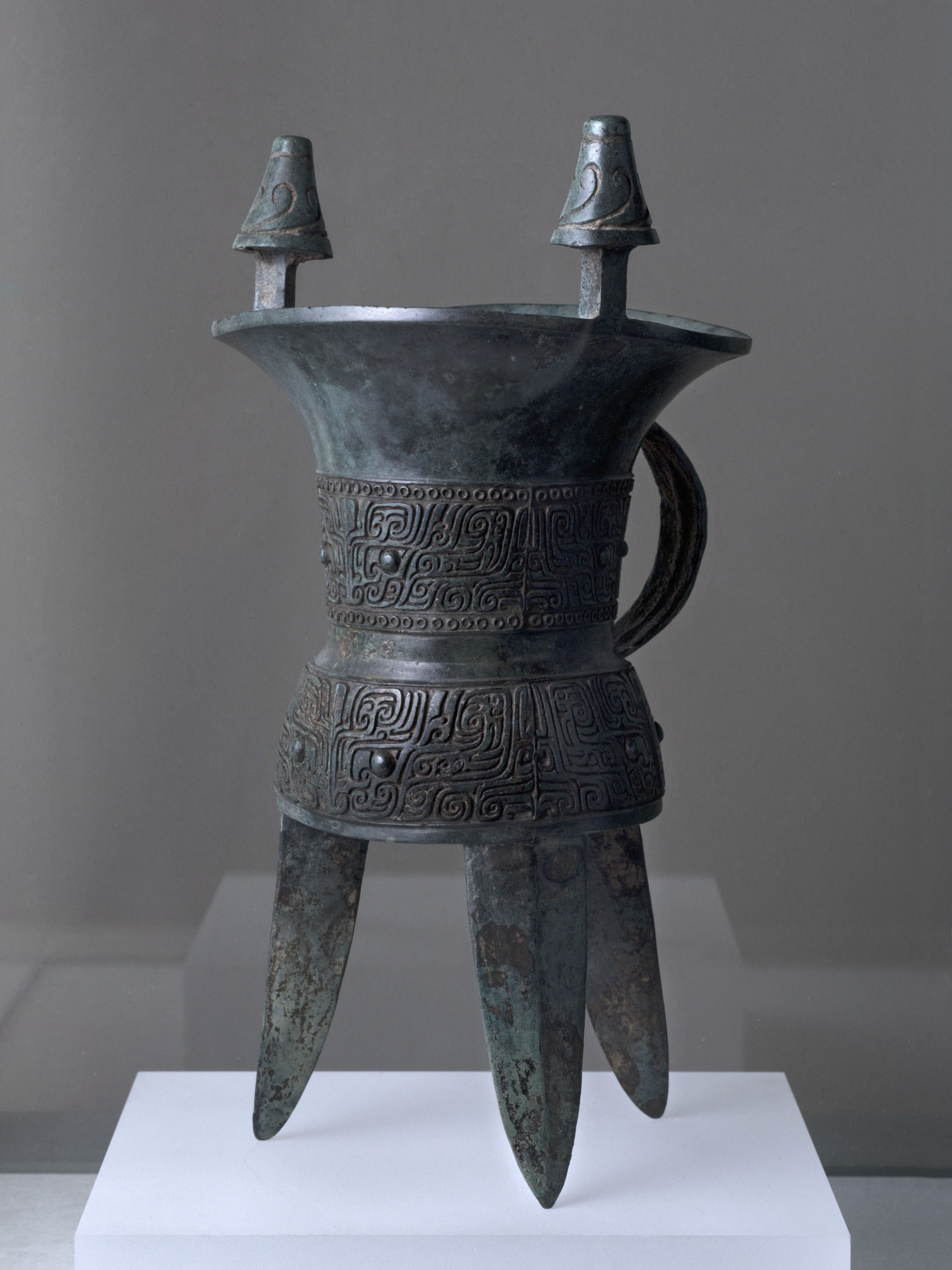
Bronze jia vessel with patterned bands, 1500-1300 BC

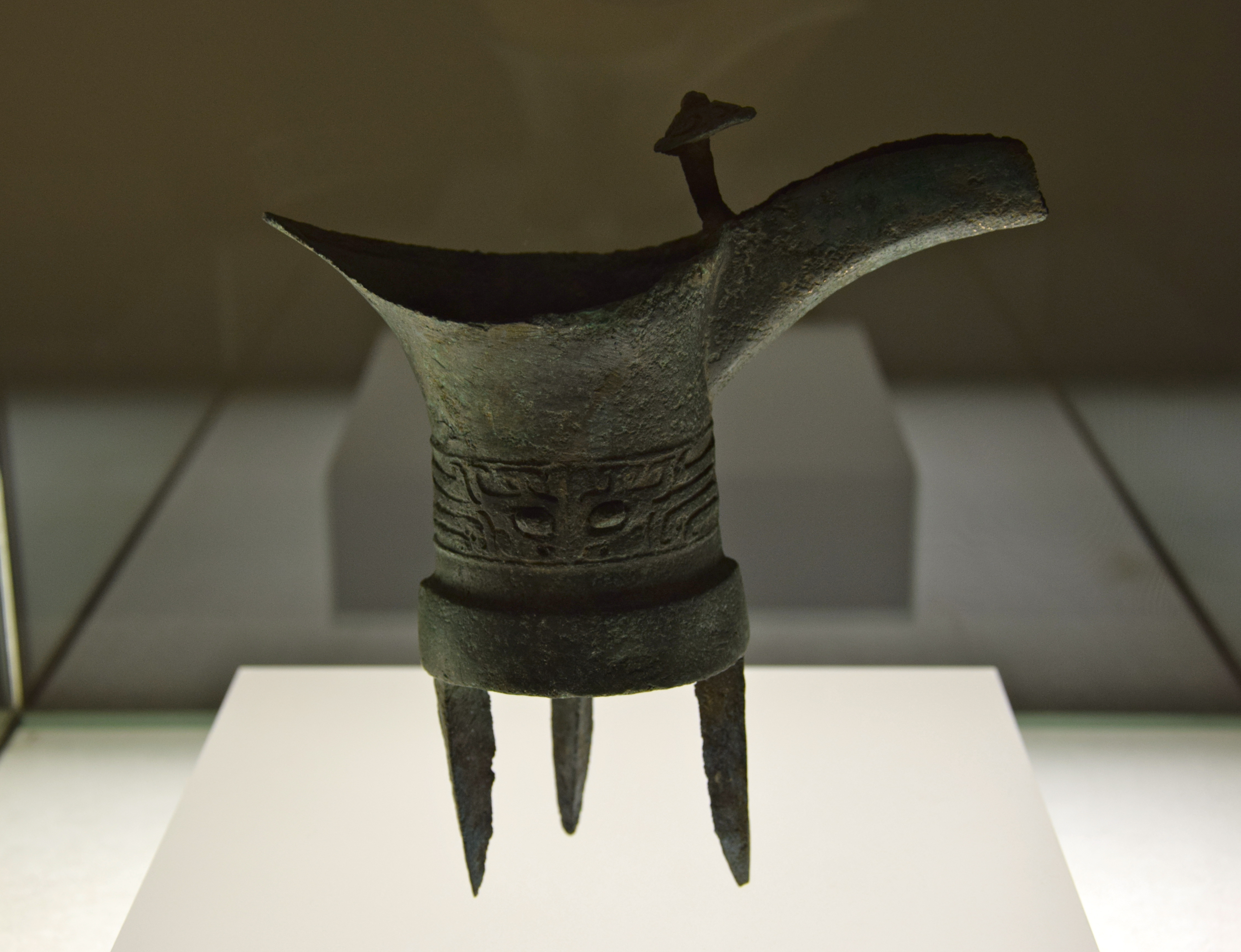
Bronze vessel of the Erligang culture.

Erligang bronzes developed from the style and techniques of the earlier Erlitou culture, centered at 85 kilometers (53 mi) to the west of Zhengzhou. Erligang was the first archaeological culture in China to show widespread use of bronze vessel castings. Bronze vessels became much more widely used and uniform in style than at Erlitou.

== Relation to traditional accounts ==
Many Chinese archaeologists believe that the ancient cities of Yanshi and Zhengzhou were among the early capitals of the Shang dynasty mentioned in traditional histories, and refer to the Erligang culture as early Shang. However many scholars and Western archaeologists have pointed out that, unlike the later Anyang settlement, no written records have been found at Erligang sites to link the archaeological remains with traditional accounts written a millennium later.

== See also ==
- Shang archaeology
- Periodization of the Shang dynasty
