= Xiaqiyuan culture =

Archaeological culture in China

Coordinates: 36.263°N 114.2703°E

- Xiaqiyuan culture in eastern China
- Geographical range: Northern Henan, southern Hebei
- Period: Bronze Age China
- Dates: c. 1800–1500 BC
- Preceded by: Longshan culture
- Followed by: Erligang culture

Chinese name
- Chinese: 下七垣文化
Transcriptions
Standard Mandarin
- Hanyu Pinyin: Xiàqīyuán wénhuà

The Xiaqiyuan culture (1800–1500 BC) was a late Neolithic culture on the eastern side of the Taihang Mountains. Unlike the contemporaneous Erlitou culture to its south, this culture lacks any evidence of overall political authority. On the basis of similarities of ceramic types with those of the succeeding Erligang culture, which is often linked with the early Shang dynasty, many archaeologists in China identify the culture, or part of it, as the Proto-Shang.

== Variants ==
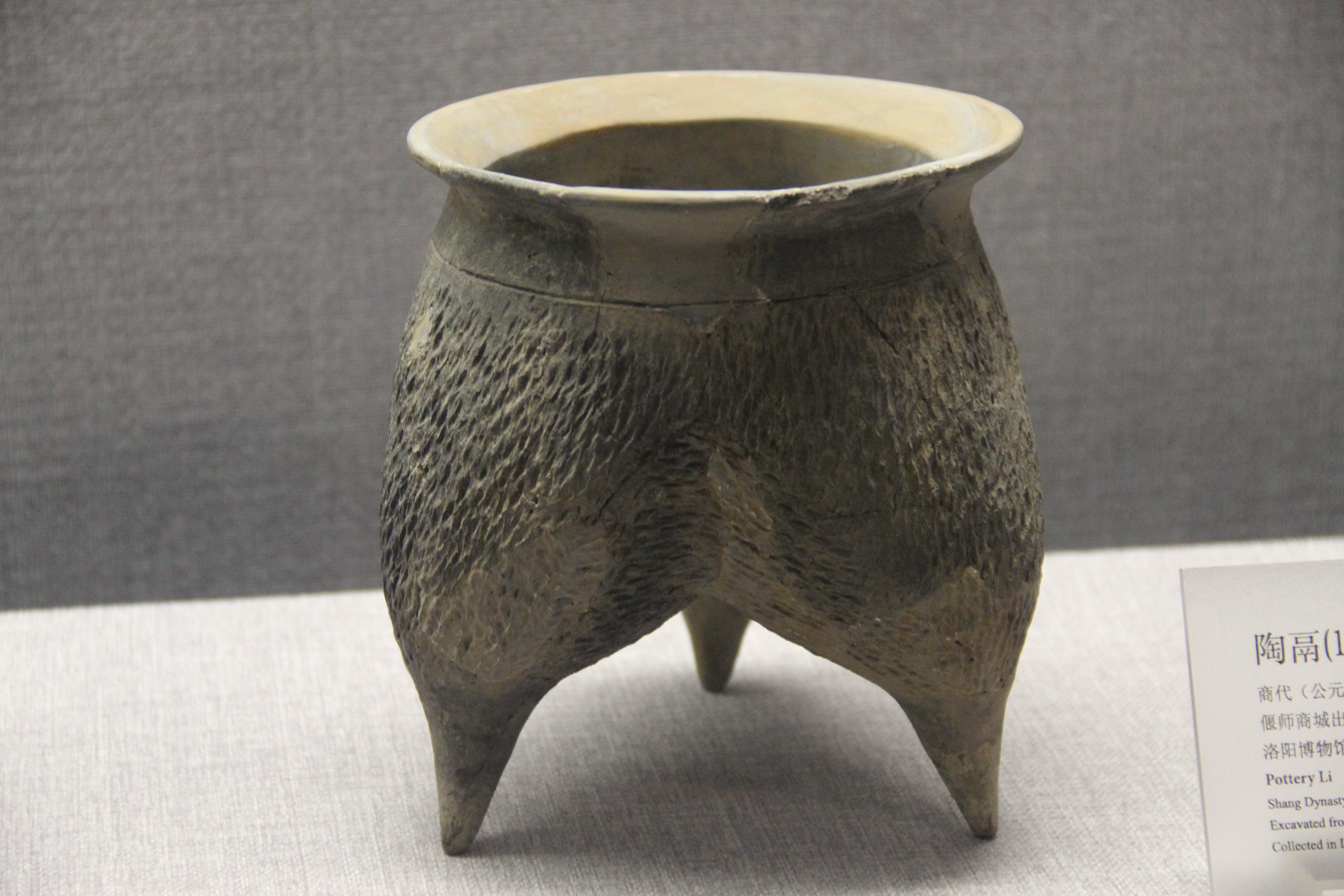
Li cooking pot from Yanshi Shang City, similar to those of the Xiaqiyuan culture

The Xiaqiyuan culture is mainly distinguished from surrounding cultures by its pottery. Cultural variants developed in the area from local Longshan culture traditions. Scholars disagree on the naming of these variants. It is also unclear whether the common features outweigh the differences between them, which tend to reflect cultures neighbouring each variant. There is no evidence of unified political control; the area probably consisted of a large number of small polities much simpler than that of Erlitou.

The Zhanghe variant stretches from the Huan River valley in northern Henan through the Zhang River valley into southern Hebei. It is the geographical centre of the Xiaqiyuan culture, and considered the most representative. Houses are either caves or semisubterranean. At the start of the period, the most common cooking vessels were deep pots (guan), as in Erlitou to the south. These were replaced with li tripods. The main type of this vessel featured thin walls, solid conical tips and cord-mark surface decoration, similar to vessels from the upper Fen River valley (near modern Taiyuan) on the other side of the Taihang Mountains. These vessels began to appear in Erlitou towards the end of the period, and would be the dominant type in the succeeding Erligang culture.

The Yuegezhuang variant is found in northern Hebei. No houses or burials associated with this variant have been found. The few metal items found are of Northern Zone styles, and appear to be trade items. No moulds for casting have been found at Xiaqiyuan sites.

The Lutaigang variant is represented by a single site, south of the Yellow River in eastern Henan. The only house found on the site was a circular surface dwelling. The main cooking vessels were guan pots, with a smaller number of li tripods. There are also a number of pottery types derived from the Yueshi culture to the east.

The Huiwei variant lies south of the Zhanghe area in the upper Wei River valley, separated from the Erlitou culture area to the south by the Qin River and the Yellow River. There is evidence of violent confrontation in the border area. Because of commonalities with Erlitou and other neighbouring cultures, this variant is sometimes classified as a separate Luwangfen–Songtao culture. The most common cooking vessels are deep guan pots, as in Erlitou (together with ding cauldrons), followed by li tripods similar to those of Zhanghe. The most common stone cutting tools are knives, rather than sickles as in Erlitou and Zhanghe. As with Zhanghe, the most common bone implement is the ladle.

== Historical theories ==
There is a strong tendency in Chinese archaeology to identify ceramic assemblages with ethnic or political groups, particularly those mentioned in traditional histories. On the basis of similar pottery types to those of the succeeding Erligang culture, which is often identified with the early part of the Shang dynasty, many archaeologists view the Zhanghe variant, or the Xiaqiyuan culture as a whole, as the Proto-Shang. Some archaeologists identify the southern Huiwei variant (or Luwangfen-Songtao culture) with the ancient Wei people described in traditional texts as being defeated by the Shang.
