= Xiaoshuangqiao =

Archaeological site in Henan, China

- 小双桥 (Chinese)
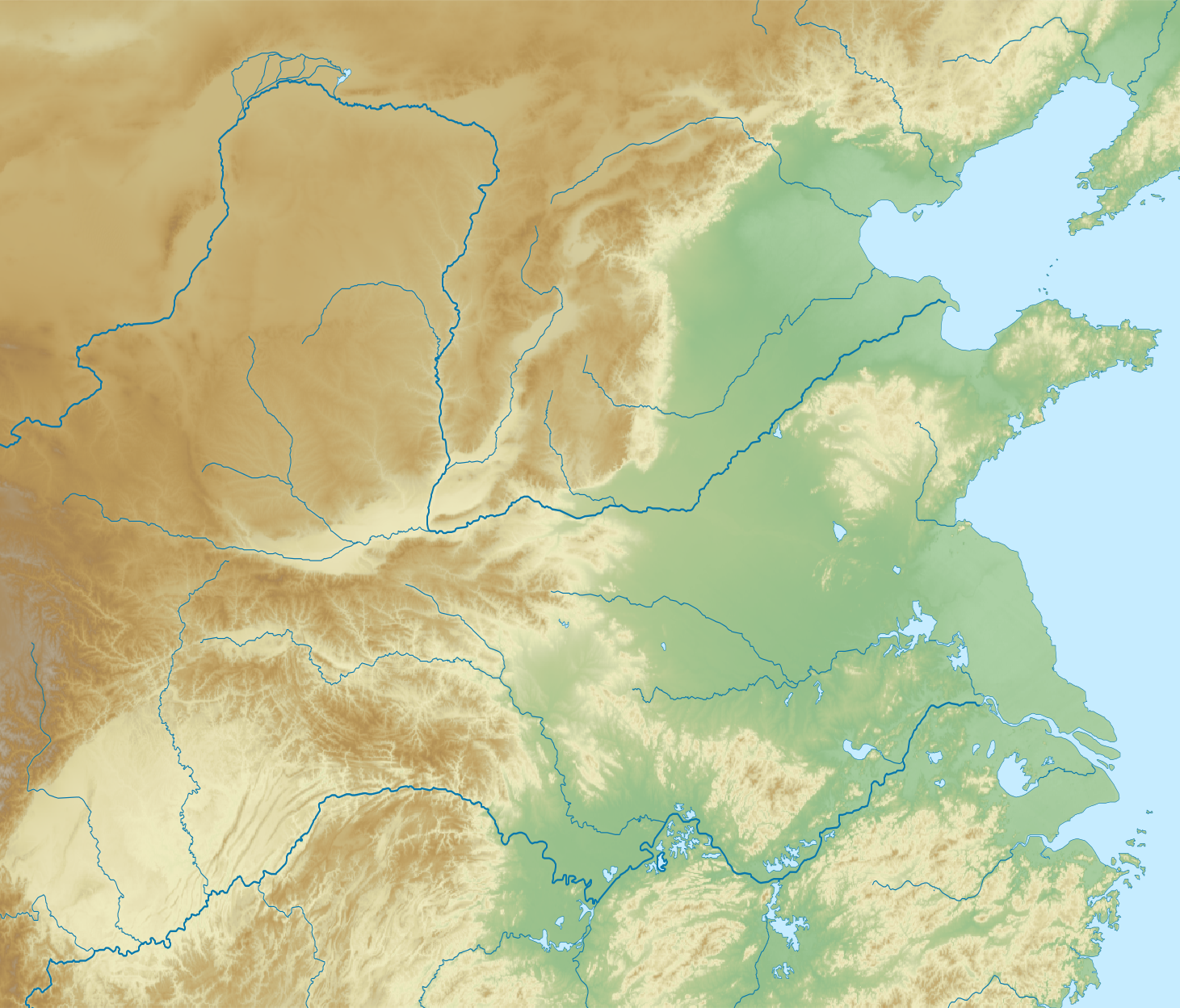
- Location within Northern China
- 34.854°N 113.575°E
- Type: city
- Location: China
- Region: Henan

History
- Built: c. 1435 BC
- Abandoned: c. 1412 BC

Site notes
- Area: 140 ha (350 acres)

Xiaoshuangqiao (simplified Chinese: 小双桥; traditional Chinese: 小雙橋; pinyin: Xiǎoshuāngqiáo) is the site of a Bronze Age city, located on the southern bank of the Suoxu River, 20 km northwest of Zhengzhou.

At the centre of the site are rammed-earth foundations of palaces. To the north are sacrificial pits containing human remains. Further pits to the north and south contain the remains of sacrificial cattle. Many of the southern pits also contain remains of other animals, pottery, tools, ornaments and waste from bronze smelting.

The pottery items bear symbols written by brush in red cinnabar pigment. In all but a few cases, these symbols occur singly. A few resemble later characters for numerals, but most are pictorial, representing people, birds and various objects.

Chronologically, the site falls between the Zhengzhou Shang City and Huanbei near modern Anyang. Some scholars identify it with the city of Ao (隞) named as one of the capitals of the Shang dynasty in Sima Qian's Records of the Grand Historian and the Bamboo Annals.

== See also ==
- Shang archaeology
- Periodization of the Shang dynasty
