= Guoyu =

Guoyu or Guo Yu may refer to:

== 國語 ==
- Standard Chinese, a standardized variety of spoken Mandarin Chinese usually called Putonghua in mainland China
  - Taiwanese Mandarin, the related standardized variety of Mandarin in Taiwan
- Guoyu (book), a classical history book of ancient China

== People ==
- Guoyu (name)
- Cheng Rui (died 903), Tang dynasty warlord known as Guo Yu at one point
