= Periodization of the Shang dynasty =

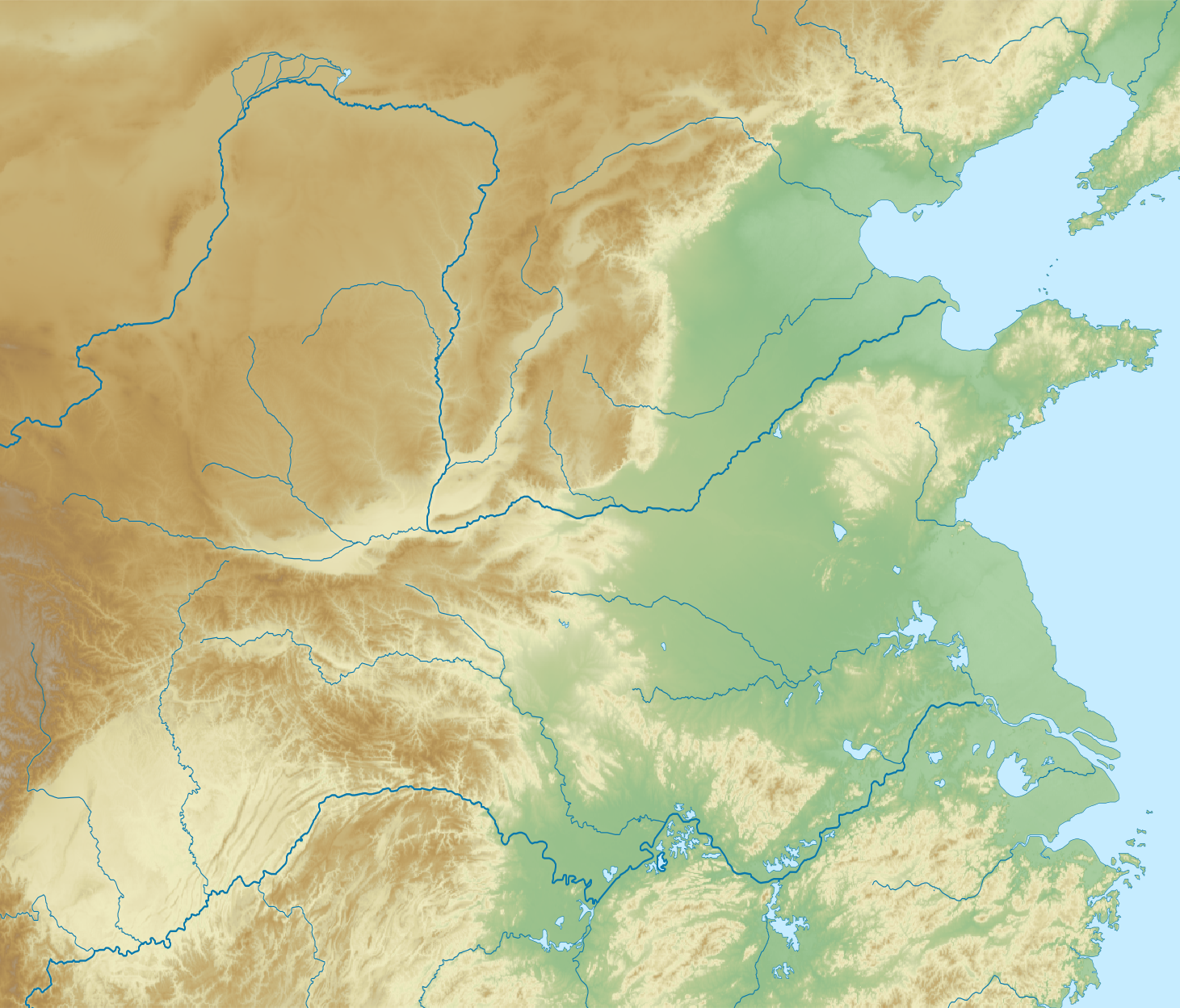
Major archaeological sites of the second millennium BC in north and central China

The periodization of the Shang dynasty is the use of periodization to organize the history of the Shang dynasty (ca. 1600-1046 BC) in ancient China. The Shang dynasty was a Chinese royal dynasty that ruled in the Yellow River valley for over 500 years, traditionally succeeding the Xia dynasty and followed by the Zhou dynasty. According to the conventional narrative of later transmitted texts, the Shang clan, led by their great leader Tang, defeated Jie of the Xia dynasty and founded a new dynasty known as Shang. The Shang moved their capital several times during the existence of the dynasty, eventually settling in a place called Yin, later known in the transmitted texts as Yinxu, located on the outskirts of the modern city of Anyang. It was eventually conquered by the Predynastic Zhou led by King Wu following the Battle of Muye in ca. 1046 BC, which led to the establishment of the Western Zhou dynasty. Scholars divide the Shang dynasty into periods for convenience, usually relating to the location of the dynasty's capital.

== Predynastic Shang ==
The Shang state that is supposed to have existed during the Xia dynasty, before its conquest of the Xia in ca. 1600 BC that led to the establishment of the Shang dynasty, is known as "Predynastic Shang" or "Proto-Shang". The Predynastic Shang started from Xie, the first known Shang ancestor, and lasted until Tang defeated the Xia dynasty in the Battle of Mingtiao. Xie is said to have helped Yu the Great, the founder of the Xia dynasty, to control the Great Flood and for his service to have been granted a place called Shang as a fief. During the period of the 14 predynastic Shang rulers before Tang, the capital had changed eight times.

== Early to Late Shang ==
For the Shang dynasty from ca. 1600 BC to 1046 BC, there are commonly two main ways of periodization for its history, including dividing it to 2 phases or 3 phases.

=== Early and Late Shang ===
A common convention in terms of historiography is to divide the Shang dynasty into eras known as Early Shang and Late Shang. The dividing line between the two periods was in the reign of Pan Geng, who is traditionally said to have moved the capital to Anyang around 1298 BC, 14 years after ascending the throne. Early Shang had 17 kings with a total reign of 304 years (ca. 1600-1298 BC), while Late Shang had 13 kings with a total reign of 255 years (ca. 1298-1046 BC). Archaeologically, Early Shang is represented by the Erligang culture within the modern Chinese city of Zhengzhou and the Late Shang by the Yanbu assemblages.

Early Shang rulers:
- Da Yi
- Da Ding
- Da Jia
- Bu Bing
- Da Geng
- Xiao Jia
- Da Wu
- Lü Ji
- Zhong Ding
- Bu Ren
- Jian Jia
- Zu Yi
- Zu Xin
- Qiang Jia
- Zu Ding
- Nan Geng
- Xiang Jia
Late Shang rulers:
- Pan Geng
- Xiao Xin
- Xiao Yi
- Wu Ding
- Zu Geng
- Zu Jia
- Lin Xin
- Kang Ding
- Wu Yi
- Wen Wu Ding
- Di Yi
- Di Xin

=== Early, Middle, and Late Shang ===
The other more recent convention of periodization in terms of archaeology is to divide the Shang dynasty into three periods known as Early Shang, Middle Shang, and Late Shang. Although no written evidence has been found, the Erligang culture has been identified as Early Shang (ca. 1600–1400 BC), related to Middle Shang (ca. 1400–1250 BC) and Late Shang (ca. 1250–1046 BC) in Anyang, based on the similarity of the material remains. These periods are alternatively referred to as the "Erligang period", the "Xiaoshuangqiao-Huanbei period", and the "Anyang period" respectively. According to this convention, Middle Shang was a phase that is called by archaeologists a transition period after the Erligang period, and was the least well-known phase among the three. Also, in this convention Late Shang might begin with Wu Ding in the second half of the 13th century BC instead of Pen Geng, spanning the reigns of the last 9 kings of the Shang dynasty. The period from Wu Ding (the earliest figure in Chinese history mentioned in contemporary records) to the end of the dynasty was the earliest known literate civilization in China.

== Shang remnants ==
With the conquest of the Shang dynasty in ca. 1046 BC, King Wu, the first king of the Zhou dynasty, appointed Wu Geng, son of the last Shang king deputy ruler of the East, in the old Shang capital as a vassal kingdom of the Zhou dynasty. To ensure Wu Geng's loyalty, three of King Wu's brothers (known as the Three Guards) were sent to watch over the Shang prince, and the newly conquered Eastern lands. Nevertheless, Shang royalists under Wu Geng joined the Rebellion of the Three Guards against the Duke of Zhou after King Wu's death, but the rebellion collapsed after three years, leaving Zhou in control of Shang territory. Members of the Shang clans were transferred to the distant lands to ensure the stability of the Zhou rule. With the support of the Duke of Zhou, King Cheng of Zhou enfeoffed Weizi, a half-brother of the last Shang king, as the Duke of Song, and the dukes of Song would maintain rites honouring the Shang kings until Qi conquered Song in 286 BC. Also, according to chronicles such as the Book of Documents and the Bamboo Annals, a disgruntled Shang prince named Jizi who had refused to cede power to the Zhou, left China with a small army and founded a state known as Gija Joseon in northwest Korea during the Gojoseon period of ancient Korean history. However, scholars debate the historical accuracy of this legend.

== See also ==
- Shang archaeology
- Chinese historiography
- List of Chinese monarchs
