= Guoyu (name) =

Guoyu (Pinyin) and Kuo-yu (Wade-Giles) is the transliteration of various Chinese given names.

People with this name include:

- Ding Guoyu (1916–2015), Chinese diplomat
- Han Kuo-yu (born 1957), Taiwanese politician
- Lin Guoyu (born 2000), Chinese footballer
