= Huanbei =

Bronze Age archaeological site in China

- 洹北 (Japanese)
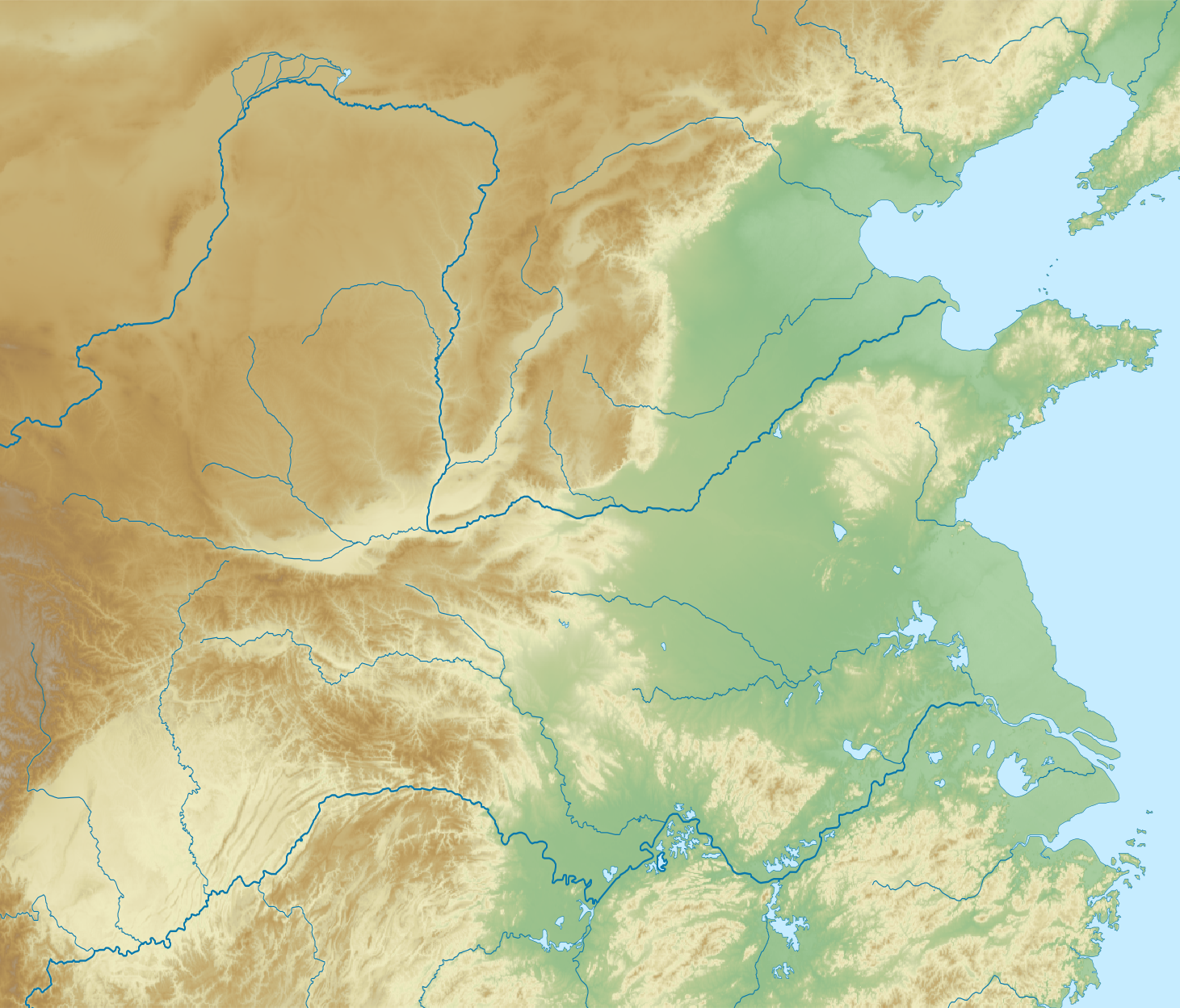
- Location within Northern China
- 36.13°N 114.34°E
- Type: walled city
- Location: China
- Region: Henan

History
- Built: c. 1350 BCE
- Abandoned: c. 1300 BCE

Site notes
- Area: 510 ha (1,300 acres)

Huanbei (Chinese: 洹北; pinyin: Huánběi), also known as Huayuanzhuang, is the site of a Bronze Age city on the northern outskirts of the modern city of Anyang in Henan province, China, discovered in 1999. The name refers to its position to the north (běi) of the Huan River. The city seems to have been burned to the ground after 50 years of occupation, shortly before the construction on the other side of the river of the site now known as Yinxu, the source of the earliest Chinese written records, oracle bones relating to the last nine kings of the Shang dynasty. Huanbei is accordingly assigned to a "Middle Shang" period.

Artifacts had been recovered from the area since the 1960s. In 1999, a walled city eight feet beneath the surface was discovered in the course of a regional survey undertaken by the Institute of Archaeology at the Chinese Academy of Social Sciences and the Archaeometry Laboratory at the University of Minnesota. The city has since been excavated by joint teams from Institute of Archaeology at the Chinese Academy of Social Sciences, the University of Minnesota, the University of Wisconsin and the University of British Columbia.

The city has walls of pounded earth forming an approximate square oriented 13 degrees east of north, with an area of 470 hectares (1,200 acres), including a palace-temple complex of 41 hectares (100 acres). Part of the site lies under Anyang's airport, limiting the scope of excavations.

== See also ==
- Shang archaeology
- Periodization of the Shang dynasty
