= Li (cookware) =

Chinese cooking pot

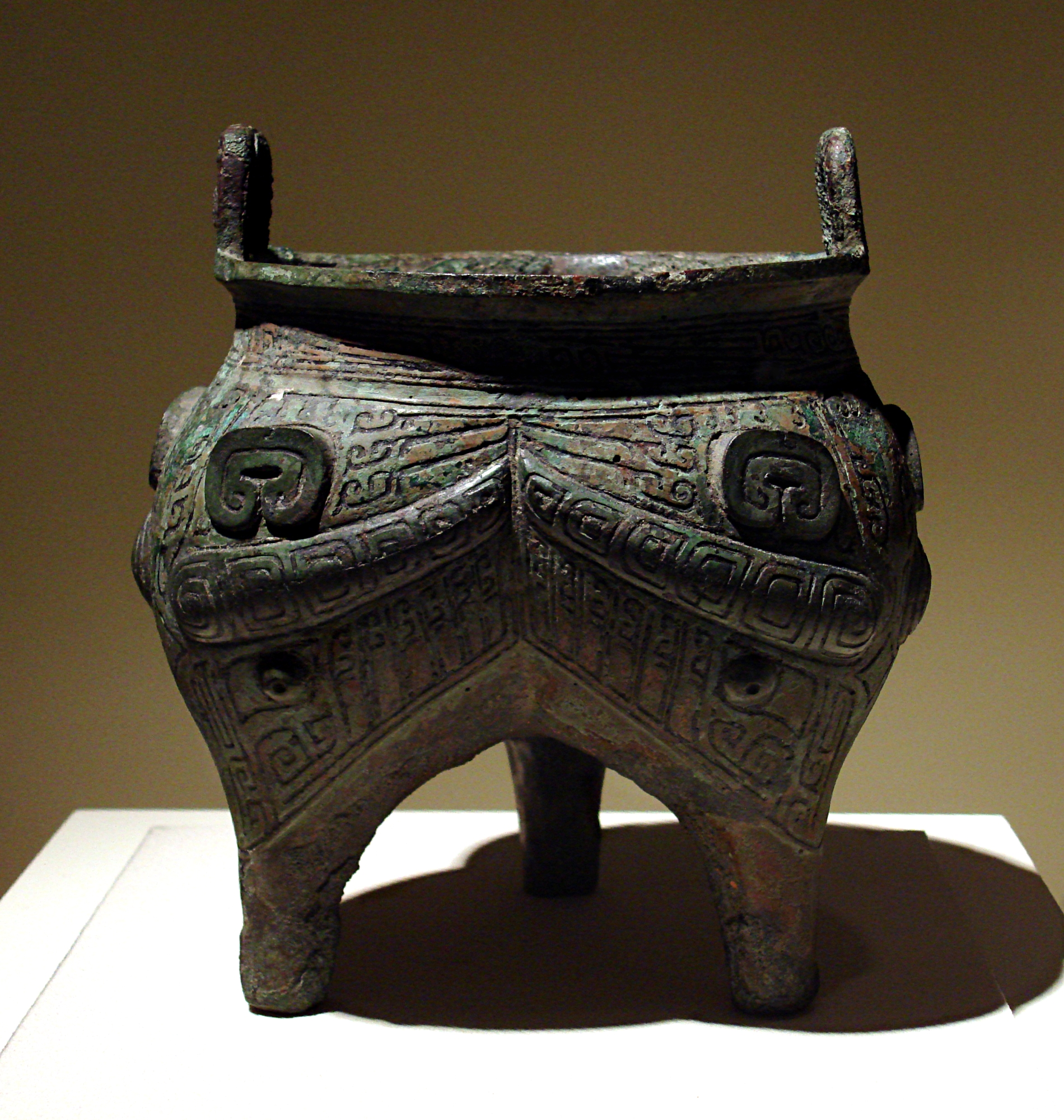
Bronze li decorated with animal faces and an ox head

Li (Chinese: 鬲; pinyin: lì) is a kind of cookware in ancient China, used for cooking and heating. Ceramic li appeared in the late Neolithic Age, and bronze li were popular from the Shang dynasty to the Spring and Autumn period. In the late Warring States period, with the popularity of stoves, they were gradually replaced by kettles.

Li appeared in the late Neolithic period and were still very popular until the Shang and Zhou dynasties. Its shape was mostly extravagant mouth, round belly, three bag-shaped feet, and some necks had double ears. It is cooked directly on fire. The shape of the li is similar to that of the tripod. In the middle and late Western Zhou dynasty, li were prevalent, and they were often buried in groups, with the size, shape, and inscriptions of a group of bronze li roughly the same.
