= Shang archaeology =

Archaeological evidence from the Shang Dynasty

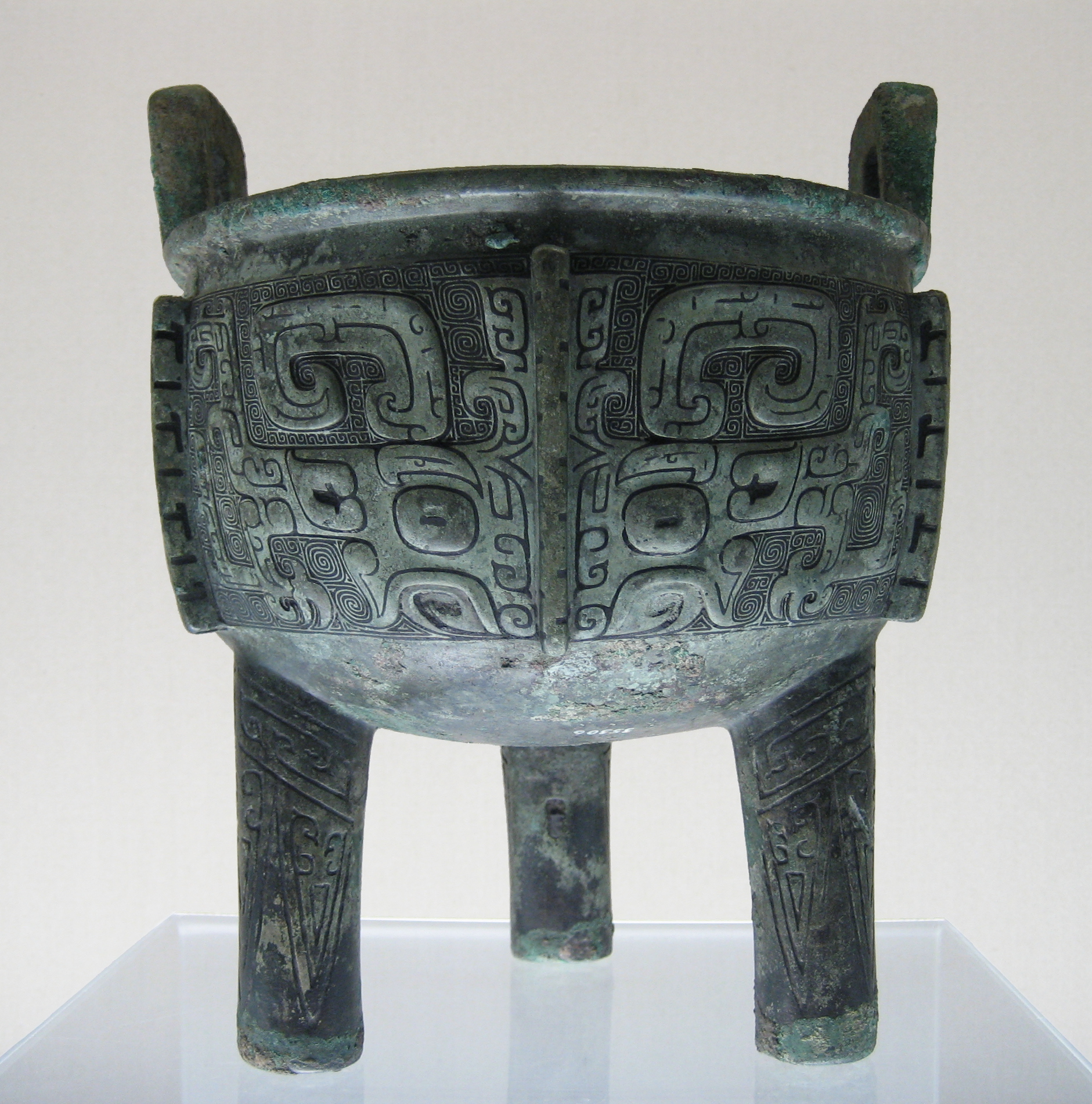
A late Shang dynasty bronze ding vessel with taotie motif.

Shang archaeology is concerned with the archaeological evidence for the Chinese Shang dynasty. Choice of excavation sites and interpretation of finds have been heavily influenced by the textual historical record.

== Excavation sites ==
Major archaeological sites in north and central China dating from the second millennium BC

The earliest and to-date most well known Shang site is Yinxu, near Anyang in Henan province. Work began in 1928 initially as an investigation of the source of oracle bones. It was carried out by a team from the new research organisation Academia Sinica, and directed by the Harvard-trained anthropologist Li Ji. Fifteen seasons of excavation were carried out at Anyang until 1937, when the Second Sino-Japanese War forced the archaeologists to evacuate. During that time, the Anyang excavators uncovered large pounded-earth (hangtu) architectural foundations, sacrificial burial cemeteries, and gigantic shaft tombs, not to mention caches of bronze vessels. Historians have come to associate the site with Yinxu, the traditional name of the Shang capital for the last twelve kings of the dynasty, starting with Pan Geng. Excavations at Anyang resumed in 1950, under the auspices of a new Institute of Archaeology, and a permanent field station was established there in 1958.

The successes at Anyang encouraged further archaeological efforts, awareness of which has been fostered by the State Bureau of Cultural Relics. In 1952, excavations at Erligang, near Zhengzhou, disclosed the remains of a walled city at least as large as Anyang, but from a demonstrably earlier period. Excavations were difficult, however, because the ancient city lay beneath the modern one.

The still older site of Erlitou, near Luoyang, was discovered in 1959 by a survey prospecting for Xia remains. The three sites of Erlitou, Erligang, and Anyang have been taken to provide a complete chronological sequence for the early Bronze Age in China.

There have also been other finds away from the Yellow River valley. A significant early achievement was the discovery of an Erligang-period city at Panlongcheng, not far from the Yangzi River. Further and more distinct finds surfaced later in the middle and lower Yangzi regions, including the Wucheng site in Jiangxi, suggesting local civilisations separate from those of the Yellow River region. This argument has grown stronger with the discoveries further afield – that of spectacular sacrificial pits at Sanxingdui, Sichuan in 1986, and of a rich tomb at Xingan, Jiangxi, in 1989.

== Oracle bones ==
Oracle bones were first recognised for their true nature in 1898, and scholars have been labouring to decipher them ever since. They circulated among collectors and antique dealers, and to this day some 200,000 oracle bone fragments from the Xiaotun site in Anyang have been counted.

These inscriptions record the pyromantic divinations performed at the court of the Shang kings. The king or his diviners would address an oral "charge" to a specially prepared turtle plastron or cattle scapula while applying a hot poker or brand to produce a series of heat cracks in the shell or bone. They then interpreted these cracks as auspicious or inauspicious, after which engravers carved into the surface of the shell or bone the subject of the charge, sometimes the forecast, and less frequently the result.

== Bronze metallurgy ==
Bronze has been left behind in China in quantities not comparable to anywhere else in the world. Both technologically and artistically, the metalworking tradition that arose in China is unlike any other in the world.

The technological feature which distinguishes Shang bronzes from those found elsewhere in the world is the technique of casting as opposed to hammering. Casting was a far more extravagant technique compared to hammering, and required both abundant mineral resources and organisation of labour.

The earliest evidence for bronze casting are the two dozen bronze vessels unearthed at Erlitou. Bronzes appear in much large quantities at Erligang, and show technological and artistic advances. The cassiterite tin ore used for bronze in the middle Huai River region during the Middle Shang period was transported over 1,500 km from the Great Hinggan Range.

== See also ==
- History of Chinese archaeology
- Periodization of the Shang dynasty
- Predynastic Shang
- Late Shang
