= Zhengzhou Shang City =

Archeological site in Zhengzhou, China

- 郑州商城 (Japanese)
- Zhèngzhōu Shāngchéng
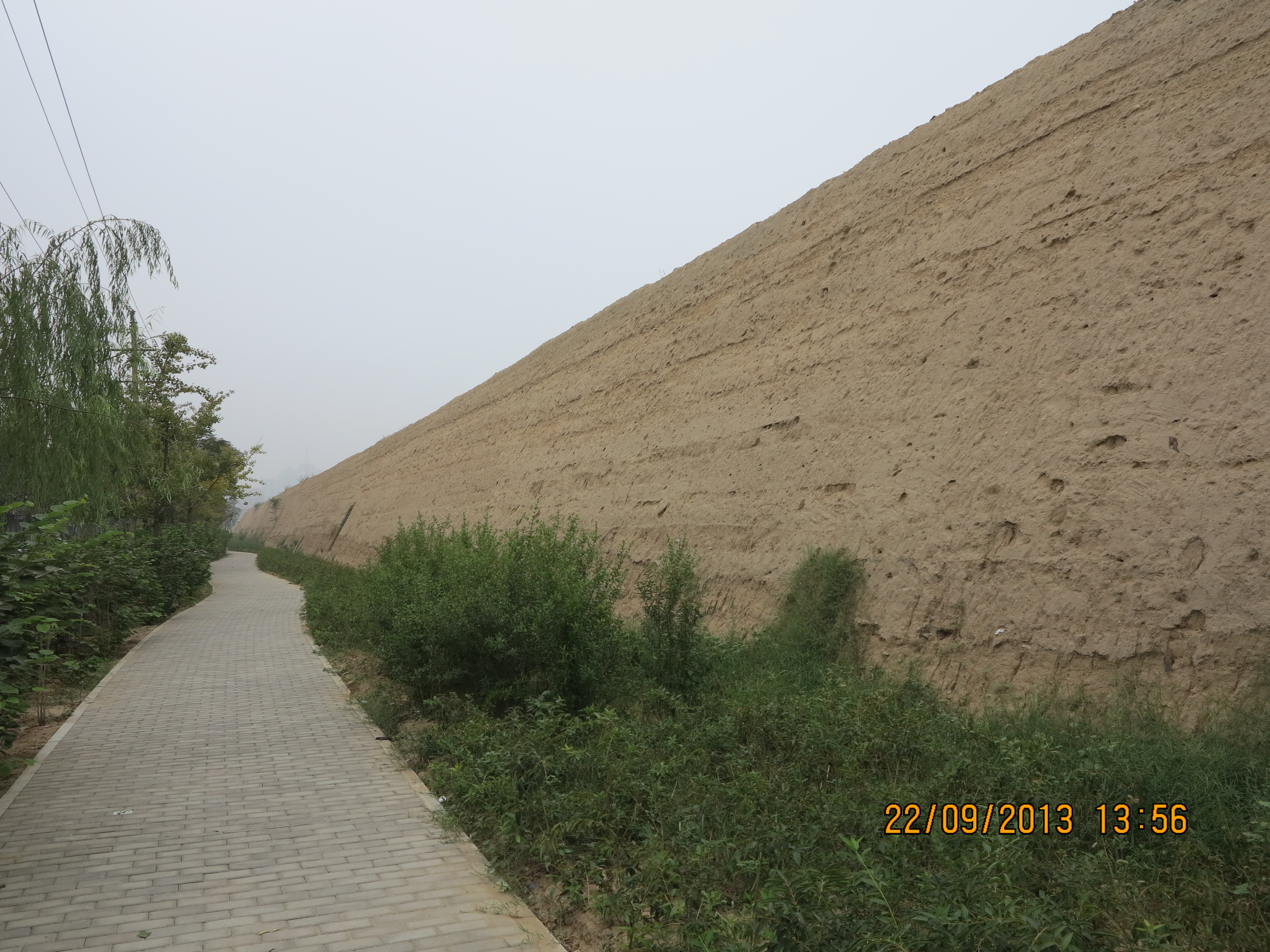
- Ruins of the inner city wall

- Location within China
- 34°45′08.0″N 113°41′25.0″E
- Type: City
- Periods: Early Shang dynasty
- Location: Zhengzhou, Henan, China
- Region: North China Plain

The Zhengzhou Shang City (simplified Chinese: 郑州商城; traditional Chinese: 鄭州商城; pinyin: Zhèngzhōu Shāng Chéng) is an archaeological site of the Bronze Age Erligang culture in Zhengzhou, Henan, China. Studies give it four chronological phases from 1630 to 1400 BC. The excavation of the site is of great importance in understanding the history of the dynasty. It is also one of the oldest archeological sites in China.

It was probably a capital of the Shang Dynasty, but of which of the several capitals was not certain.

== Excavations ==
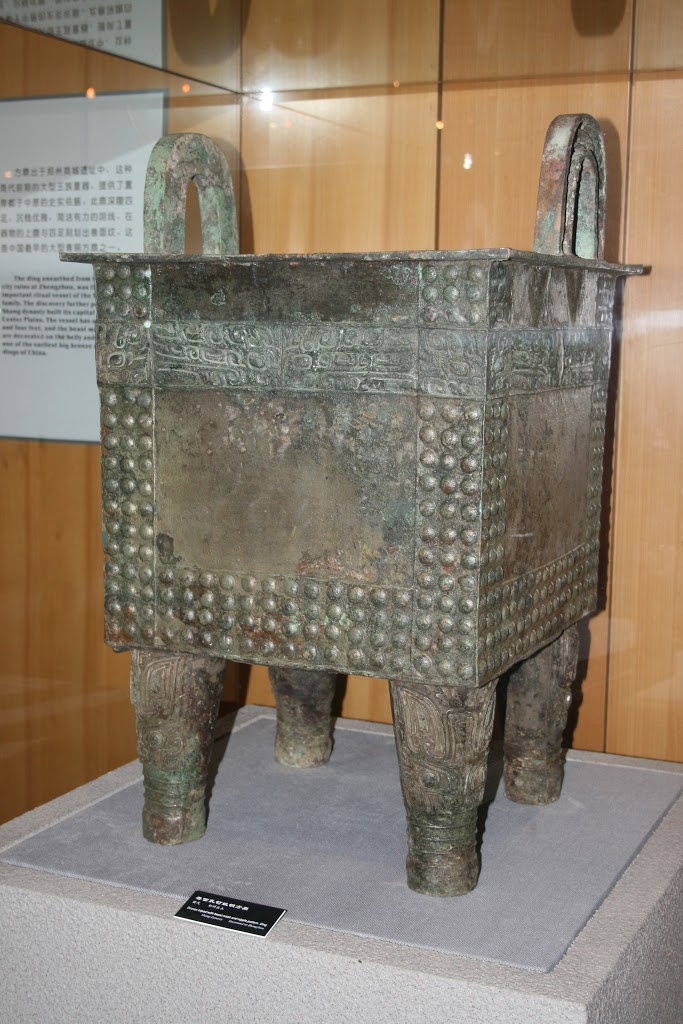
Bronze ding cauldron from the Zhengzhou site

Archaeologist Han Weizhou discovered the site in 1950. In the spring of 1951, a group of archaeologists from the Institute of Archaeology, Chinese Academy of Sciences came to research in Zhengzhou. They collected some specimens and confirmed that it was indeed of Shang dynasty, and older than the Shang city of Yinxu in Anyang.

Erligang is the type site of Erligang culture. This is the area located outside the giant walls of the ancient city. Starting in 1952, the first formal archaeological excavations at Erligang began. Also the east area of Luoyang was explored. In 1954, the archaeologist An Jinhuai and staff conducted a large-scale excavation in this area. The site of the city walls was identified to be of Shang dynasty in 1955. The living area of the royal families was found in the northeast part of Shang City. The excavation was forced to stop because of the Cultural Revolution.

In 1971, An Jinhuai reorganized the archaeological group to continue excavations when he had a chance to go back to Zhengzhou. In 1973, they found ruins of many buildings of differing sizes made of hangtu. This turned out to be the palace area. Archaeologists found numerous other sites in this area. The excavations are difficult because the modern city covers most of the ancient city area.

== Layout ==
The city was rectangular in form. The perimeter of the inner city walls was around 6,960 meters, with 11 gaps that might be city gates. The north wall was about 1,690 meters in length, the west about 1,870 meters, while the south and east were both about 1,700 meters. The walls were estimated to have been 20 meters (66 feet) wide at the base, rising to a height of 8 meters (26 feet). The inner city covered an area of roughly 300 hectares (740 acres). The palaces were located in the northeast of the city and inside were water storage facilities made of stones. There were also smaller buildings believed to be where slaves lived. Recent archaeological findings include the existence of an outer city and wall. The area inside the outer wall may be as large as 1,500 hectares (3,700 acres). Large workshops were located in the outer city, including a bone workshop, a pottery workshop and two bronze vessel workshops.

== Bronze casting ==
Bronze items made in Zhengzhou were heavier and technically more advanced than those made in Erlitou. The use of bronze tools was also more common in comparison with Erlitou.
