= Huan River =

River in Henan, China

Coordinates: 35.985°N 114.79°E

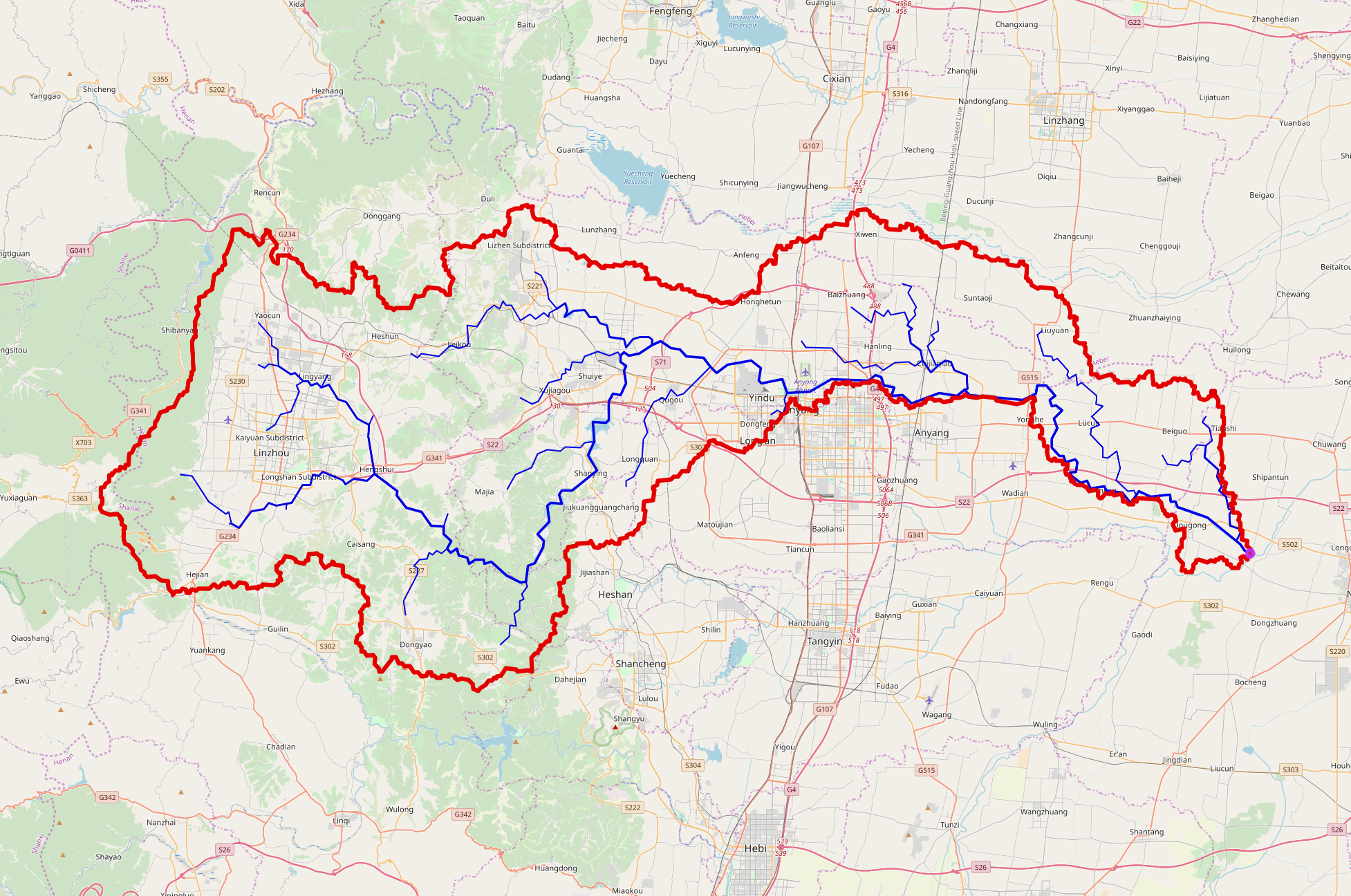
Huan river basin

The Huan River (Chinese: 洹河; pinyin: Huán Hé), or Anyang River (安阳河), is a river in Henan, China, and part of the Hai River basin. The river rises north of Linzhou in northwestern Henan, and joins the Wei River near Neihuang in the northeast of the province.

The site of Yinxu, in the village of Xiaotun within present-day Anyang on the south bank of the river, has been identified as the last capital of the Shang dynasty, occupied between the 13th and 11th centuries BCE. A walled city and palace complex at Huanbei on the north bank, occupied in the second half of the 14th century BCE, was destroyed at the time Yinxu was built. The river's name, Huan 洹, has been in use for more than 3,000 years. The character was recorded on both Shang-era oracle bones and bronze vessels.

== Bibliography ==
- Jing, Zhichun; Tang, Jigen; Rapp, George; Stoltman, James (2013). "Recent discoveries and some thoughts on early urbanization at Anyang". In Underhill, Anne P. (ed.). A Companion to Chinese Archaeology. John Wiley & Sons. pp. 343–366. ISBN 978-1-118-32572-8.
- Li, Feng (2013). Early China: A Social and Cultural History. Cambridge University Press. ISBN 978-0-521-89552-1.
