= Chinese ritual bronzes =

Chinese decorated bronzes deposited as grave goods

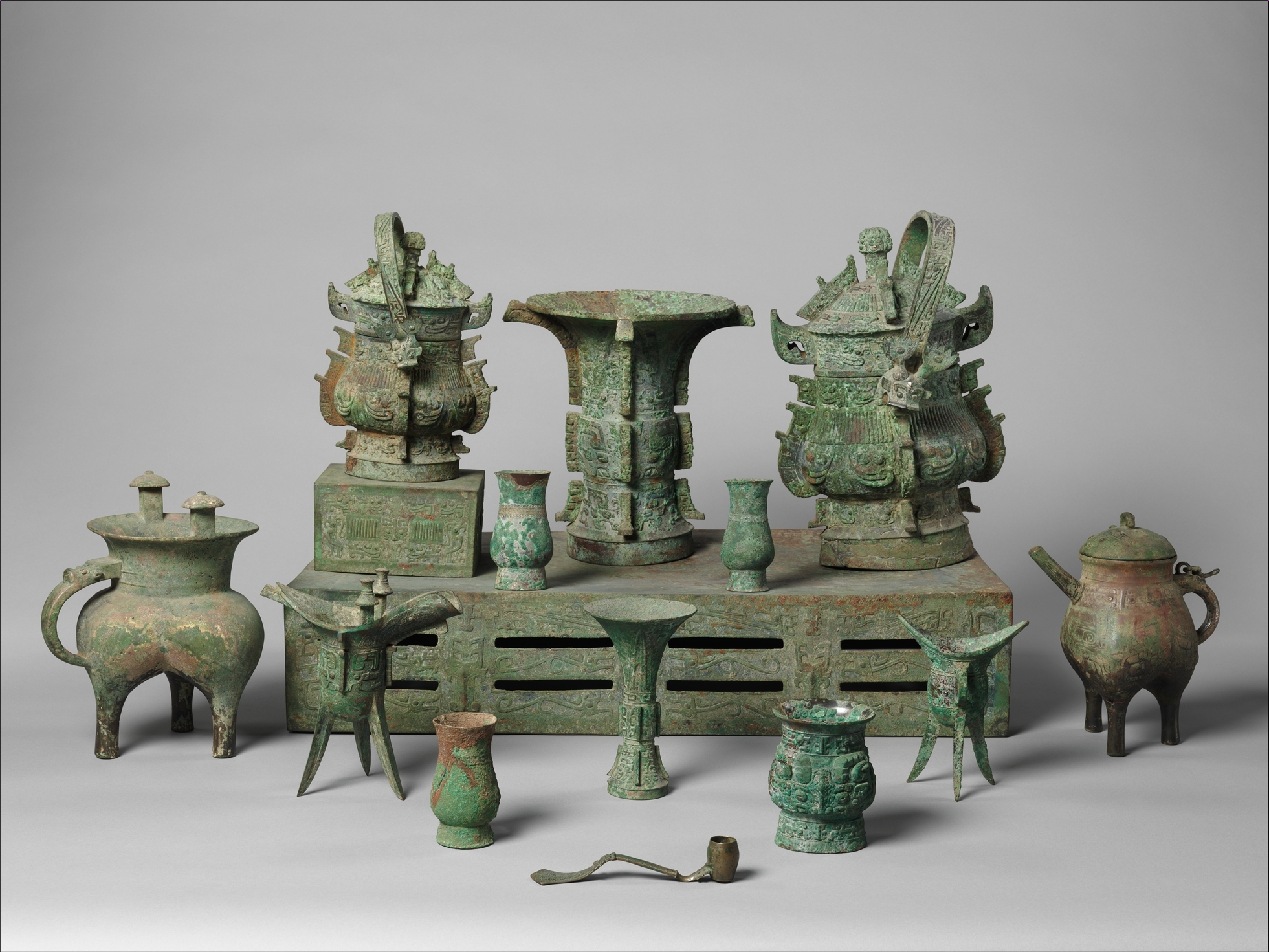
A variety of wine vessels around an altar, Western Zhou – Metropolitan Museum of Art.

From c. 1650 BC, elaborately decorated bronze vessels were deposited as grave goods in the tombs of royalty and nobility during the Chinese Bronze Age. Documented excavations have found over 200 pieces in a single royal tomb. They were produced for an individual or social group to use in making ritual offerings of food and drink to his or their ancestors and other deities or spirits. Such ceremonies generally took place in family temples or ceremonial halls over tombs. These ceremonies can be seen as ritual banquets in which both living and dead members of a family were supposed to participate. Details of these ritual ceremonies are preserved through early literary records. On the death of the owner of a ritual bronze, it would often be placed in his tomb, so that he could continue to pay his respects in the afterlife; other examples were cast specifically as grave goods. Indeed, many surviving examples have been excavated from graves.

The bronzes were likely not used for normal eating and drinking; they represent larger, more elaborate versions of the types of vessels used for this, and made in precious materials. Many of the shapes also survive in pottery, and pottery versions continued to be made in an antiquarian spirit until modern times. Apart from table vessels, weapons and some other objects were made in special ritual forms. Another class of ritual objects are those, also including weapons, made in jade, which was probably the most highly valued of all, and which had been long used for ritual tools and weapons, since c. 4500 BC.

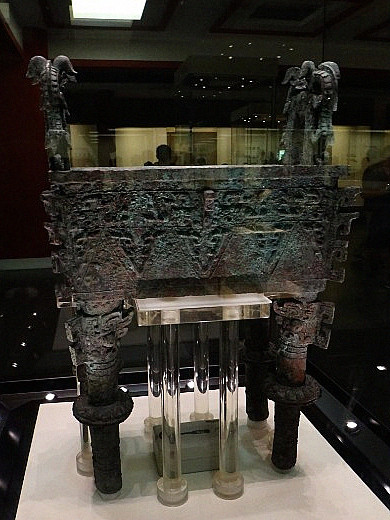
Taibao Ding from Shandong, Western Zhou (c. 10th century BC)

At least initially, the production of bronze was probably controlled by the ruler, who gave unformed metal to his nobility as a sign of favour. The technology of bronze production was described in the Kao Gong Ji, compiled some time between the 5th and 3rd centuries BC.

== Use ==
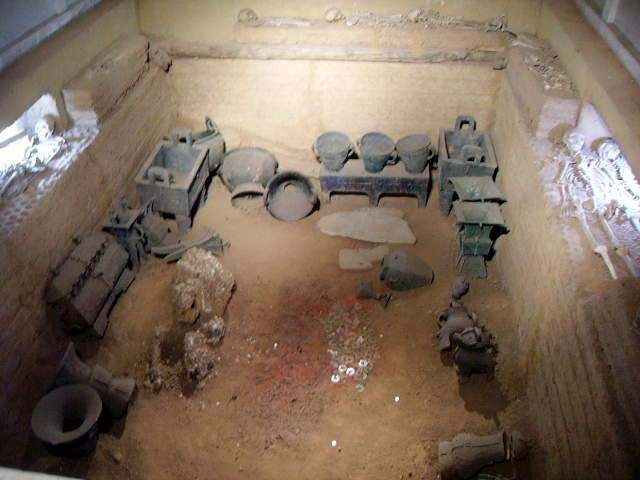
Burial pit at the Tomb of Fu Hao

Bronzes (青铜器; 青銅器; qīng tóng qì; ch'ing t'ong ch'i) are some of the most important pieces of ancient Chinese art, warranting an entire separate catalogue in the Imperial art collections. The Chinese Bronze Age began in the Xia dynasty (c. 2070 – c. 1600 BC), and bronze ritual containers form the bulk of collections of Chinese antiquities, reaching its zenith during the Shang dynasty (c. 1600 – c. 1046 BC) and the early part of the Zhou dynasty (1045–256 BC).

The majority of surviving Chinese ancient bronze artefacts are ritual forms rather than their equivalents made for practical use, either as tools or weapons. Weapons like daggers and axes had a sacrificial meaning, symbolizing the heavenly power of the ruler. The strong religious associations of bronze objects brought up a great number of vessel types and shapes which became regarded as classic and totemic and were copied, often in other media such as Chinese porcelain, throughout subsequent periods of Chinese art.

The ritual books of old China minutely describe who was allowed to use what kinds of sacrificial vessels and how much. The king of Zhou used 9 dings and 8 gui vessels, a duke was allowed to use 7 dings and 6 guis, a baron could use 5 dings and 3 guis, a nobleman was allowed to use 3 dings and 2 guis. Turning to actual archaeological finds, the tomb of Fu Hao, an unusually powerful Shang queen, contained her set of ritual vessels, numbering over two hundred, which are also far larger than the twenty-four vessels in the tomb of a contemporary nobleman. Her higher status would have been clear not only to her contemporaries, but also, it was believed, to her ancestors and other spirits. Many of the pieces were cast with inscriptions using the posthumous form of her name, indicating they were made especially for burial in the tomb.

== Metallurgy and origin ==
The origin of the ores or metals used for Shang and other early Chinese bronze is a current (2018) topic of research. As with other early civilisations (Egypt, Mesopotamia, Indus), Shang settlement was centered on river valleys, and driven in part by the introduction of intensive agriculture. In China such areas lacked ore deposits and required the import of metallurgical material. Typical Shang period bronzes contain over 2% lead, unlike contemporary coppers of the Eurasian Steppe. Pre-Shang bronzes do not contain the radiogenic lead isotopes. Scholars have sought to determine the source of the ores been based on lead content and trace isotope analysis. In the case of Shang period bronzes, various sites, from early to late Shang period, numerous samples of the bronze alloy are characterized by high radiogenic lead isotope content (derived from both uranium and thorium decay), unlike most known native Chinese lead ores. Potential sources of the ore include Qinling, middle to lower Yangtze area, and south-west China; the possibility that ore or metal was imported from Africa in this period has been proposed, based on potential isotopic matches, but challenged and rejected by other researchers.

The pattern of metal circulation revealed by the existence of highly radiogenic lead remains controversial, partly because radiogenic lead sources may not be as rare in China as initially thought but also because different lead isotope signatures do not necessarily signify different geographical locations, but pockets of radiogenic lead in the same common lead deposit. A recent compositional analysis has proposed that the metals used to manufacture the Chinese ritual bronzes derived from mining progressively deeper ores in deposits close to where many of these bronzes were unearthed, and calls into question interpretations of social, cultural and technological change during the Chinese Bronze Age predicated on the acquisition of metals from disparate regions. However, it is likely that the earliest tin deposits were alluvial and perhaps exploited by the same methods used for panning gold in placer deposits.

The bronzes typically contain between 5% and 30% tin and between 2% and 3% lead.

== Casting technology ==
=== Piece-mould casting ===
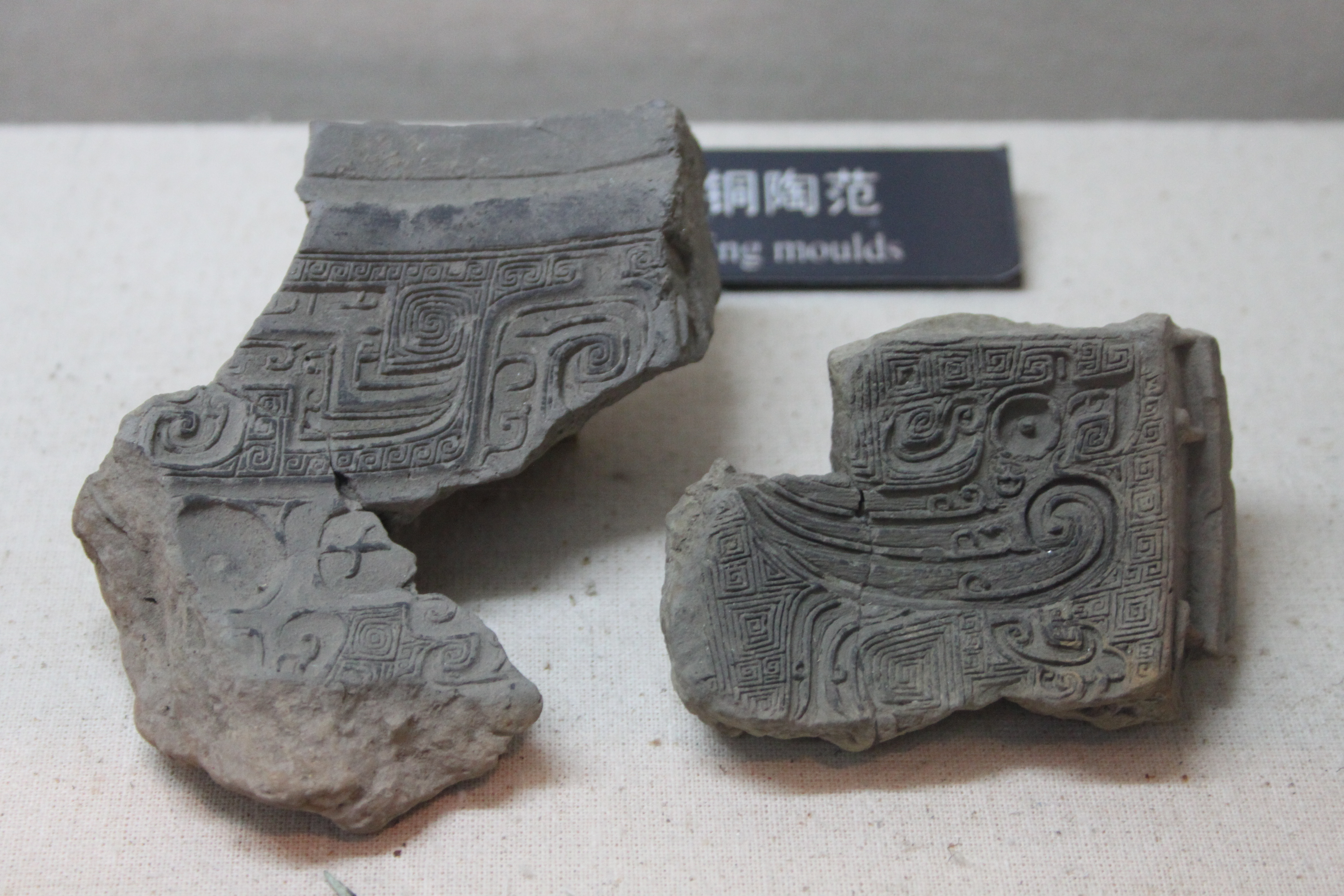
Shang pottery moulds, c. 1200 BC

From the Bronze Age to the Han dynasty, the main technique used in ancient China to cast ritual vessels, weapons and other utensils was the piece-mould casting. In the piece-mould process, a section mould can be formed in two ways. First, a clay mould is formed around the model of the object to be cast and then removed in sections. In the second approach, no model is required. Instead, a mould is created inside a clay-lined container and stamped with the desired finish. In both methods, mould parts are fired and then reassembled. Clay castings are then made, and parts removed. The resulting clay casting looks like a finished product, is allowed to dry, and then filed flat to form a core. This establishes the casting space, which determines the thickness of the finished product. The parts are then reassembled around the core, and the parts are cast. The clay moulds are then broken up, and the finished castings are removed and polished with abrasives to obtain a shiny finish. The number of parts the mould is cut into depends entirely on the shape and design of the object to be cast.

=== Casting-on ===
Casting on is an ancient Chinese casting technique used to attach prefabricated handles and other small accessories to larger bronze objects. This technique has been in use as early as the Bronze Age, first in the South and then in the Shanghe region of the Central Plains. The importance of casting in the manufacture of personal ornaments is that it is used to create the connecting bronze chains.

=== Lost-wax casting ===
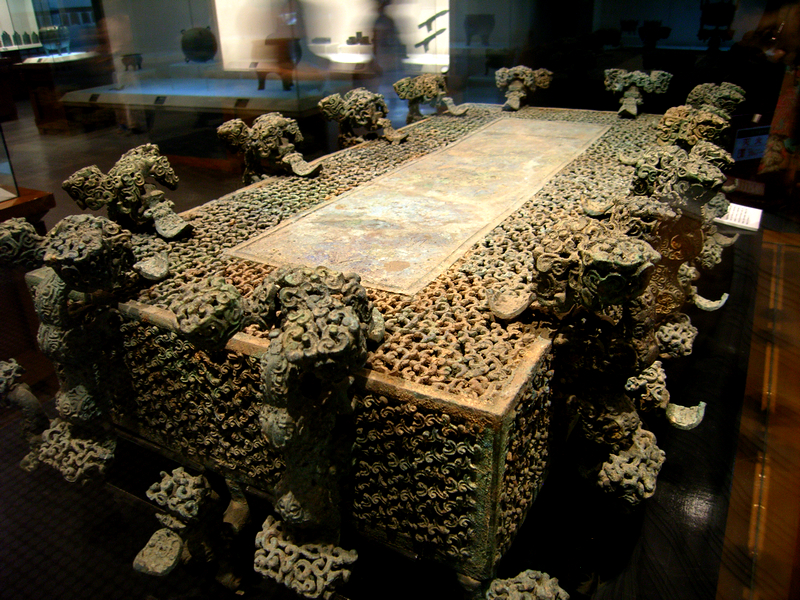
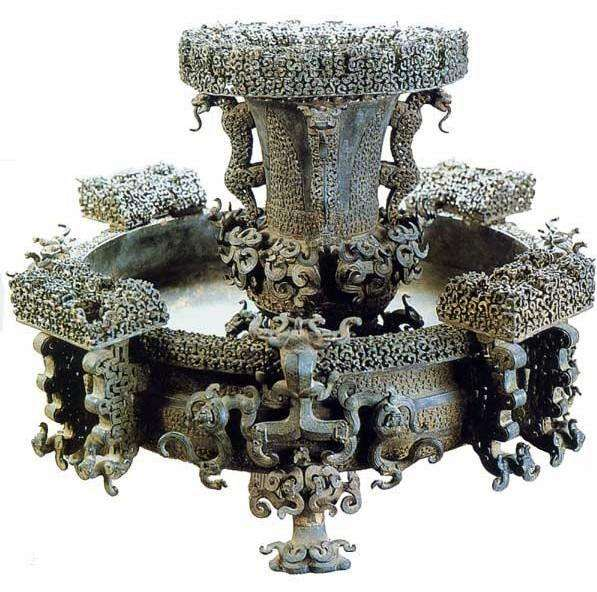
The items above are unearthed from the Tomb of Marquis Yi of Zeng, and are great examples of lost-wax casting, without which such intricate designs are impossible to achieve.

The earliest archaeological evidence of lost wax casting in China was found in the 6th century BC, at the cemetery of Chu in Xichuan, Henan province. Bronze Jin, cast using traditional piece-mould techniques, is further embellished by adding prefabricated ornate open worked handles, which are produced through a lost wax process and then attached. Lost wax was eventually introduced to China from the ancient Near East. The process has an early and long history in the region, but exactly when and how it was introduced is unclear. The process is more suitable for casting decorations with deep undercuts and openwork designs than the moulding process, which complicates the removal of moulded parts from the model. Although lost-wax casting was never used to make large vessels, it became more and more popular between the late Eastern Zhou and Han dynasties. The lost-wax casting process for casting small parts was more economical than the mould-making process because the amount of metal used was easier to control.

In the lost wax process, the object to be cast is first modeled. Wax, which is easy to shape and carve and which melts away under the proper conditions, has been the most commonly used material for this purpose since antiquity. The wax model is then coated with clay to form the mould. The first coat of clay is usually carefully brushed to prevent trapping of air bubbles; subsequent coats may be rougher. Then, the clay is fired and the wax melts (thus "lost wax"). Molten metal is then poured into the clay mould to replace the burnt wax model. After the metal cools, the fired-clay model is opened to reveal the finished product. The resulting cast object is a metal replica of the original wax model.

== Classification of pieces in the Imperial collection ==
The appreciation, creation and collection of Chinese bronzes as pieces of art and not as ritual items began in the Song dynasty and reached its zenith in the Qing dynasty during the reign of the Qianlong Emperor, whose massive collection is recorded in the catalogues known as the Xiqing gujian and the Xiqing jijian (西清繼鑑). Within those two catalogues, the bronzeware is categorized according to use:

- Sacrificial vessels (祭器, jìqì),
- Wine vessels (酒器, jiǔqì),
- Food vessels (食器, shíqì),
- Water vessels (水器, shuǐqì),
- Musical instruments (樂器, yuèqì),
- Weapons (兵器, bīngqì),
- Measuring containers (量器, liángqì),
- Ancient money (錢幣, qiánbì), and
- Miscellaneous (雜器, záqì).

The most highly prized are generally the sacrificial and wine vessels, which form the majority of most collections. Often these vessels are elaborately decorated with taotie designs.

=== Sacrificial vessels ===
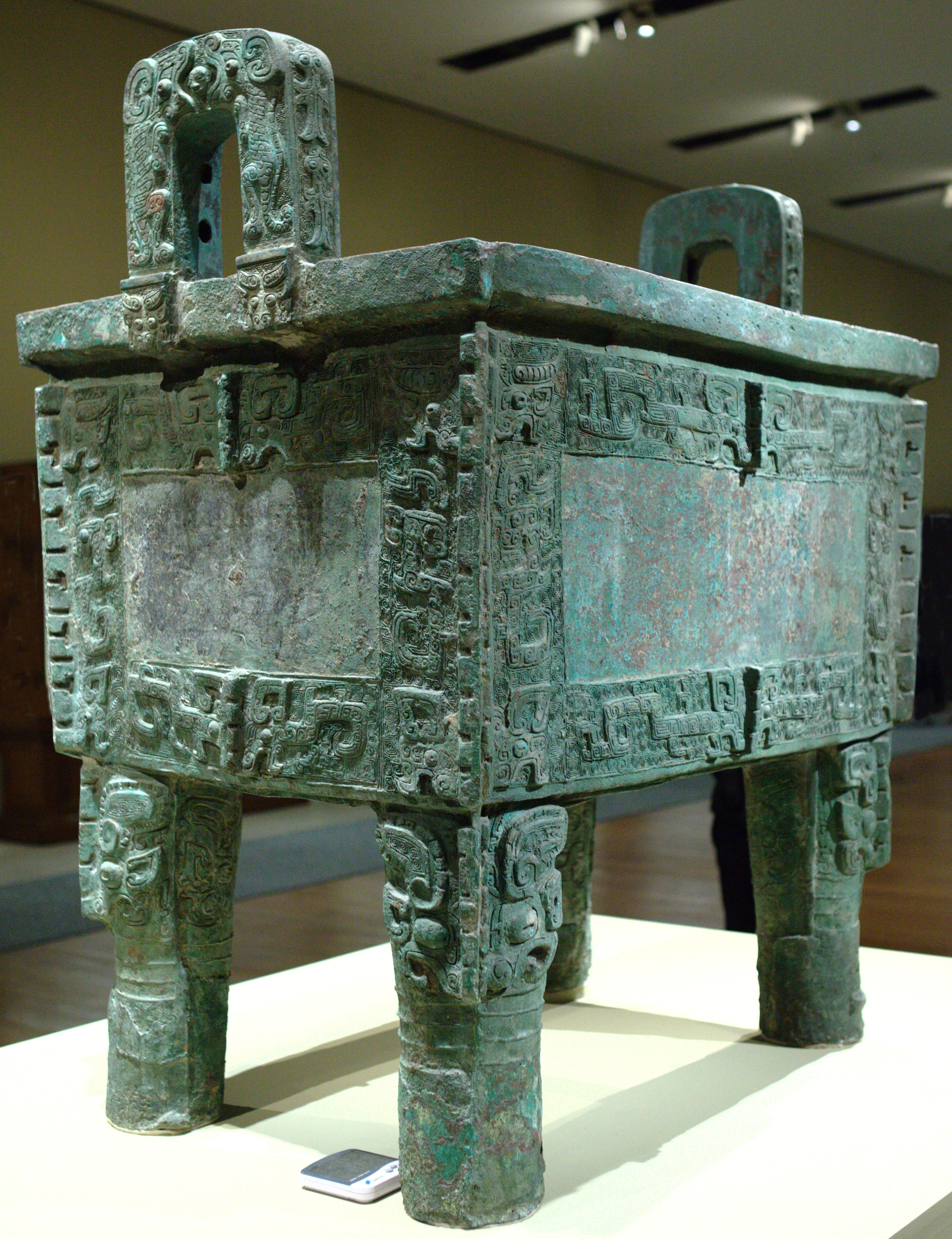
The Houmuwu ding, the largest ancient bronze ever found

- Dǐng (鼎) Sacrificial vessel (祭器), originally a cauldron for cooking and storing meat (食器). The Shang prototype has a round bowl, wider than it is tall, set on three legs (足); there are two short handles on each side (耳). Later examples became larger and larger and were considered a measure of power. It is considered the single most important class of Chinese bronzeware in terms of its cultural importance. There is a variation called a fāngdǐng (方鼎) which has a rectangular bowl and four legs, one at each corner. There exist rare forms with lids. Xiqing Gujian(西清古鑒) contains over two hundred examples of ding vessels, which are among the most highly regarded of all Chinese bronzes.
- Dòu (豆): Sacrificial vessel (祭器) that was originally a food vessel. Flat, covered bowl on a long stem.
- Fǔ (簠): Rectangular dish, triangular in vertical cross-section. Always with a lid shaped like the dish.
- Zūn (尊 or 樽 or 鐏): Wine vessel and sacrificial vessel (器為盛酒亦祭用也). Tall cylindrical wine cup, with no handles or legs. The mouth is usually slightly broader than the body. In the late Zhōu (周) dynasty, this type of vessel became exceedingly elaborate, often taking the shape of animals and abandoning the traditional shape. These later types are distinguished from gōng (觥) by retaining a small, roughly circular mouth. This type of vessel forms the second largest group of objects in the Xiqing gujian, after the dǐng (鼎).
- Zǔ (俎): Flat rectangular platform with square legs at each corner. Not represented in the Xiqing gujian.
- Yí (彝): Sacrificial vessel. Two forms: A. Large squat round pot with two handles; B. Tall box-like container, the base narrower than the mouth with a roof-like lid. Later became a generic name for all sacrificial vessels.
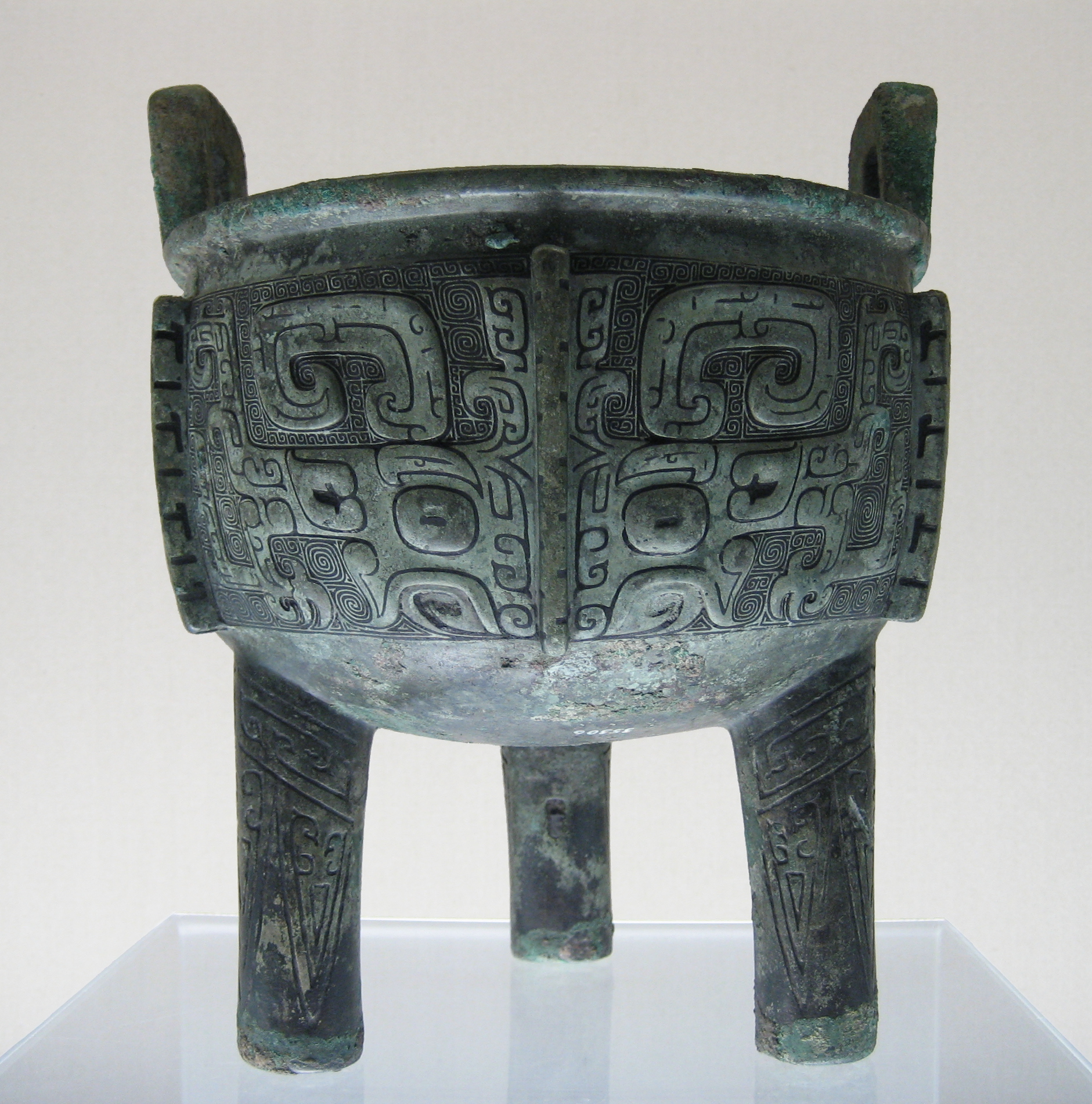
A Late Shang dǐng

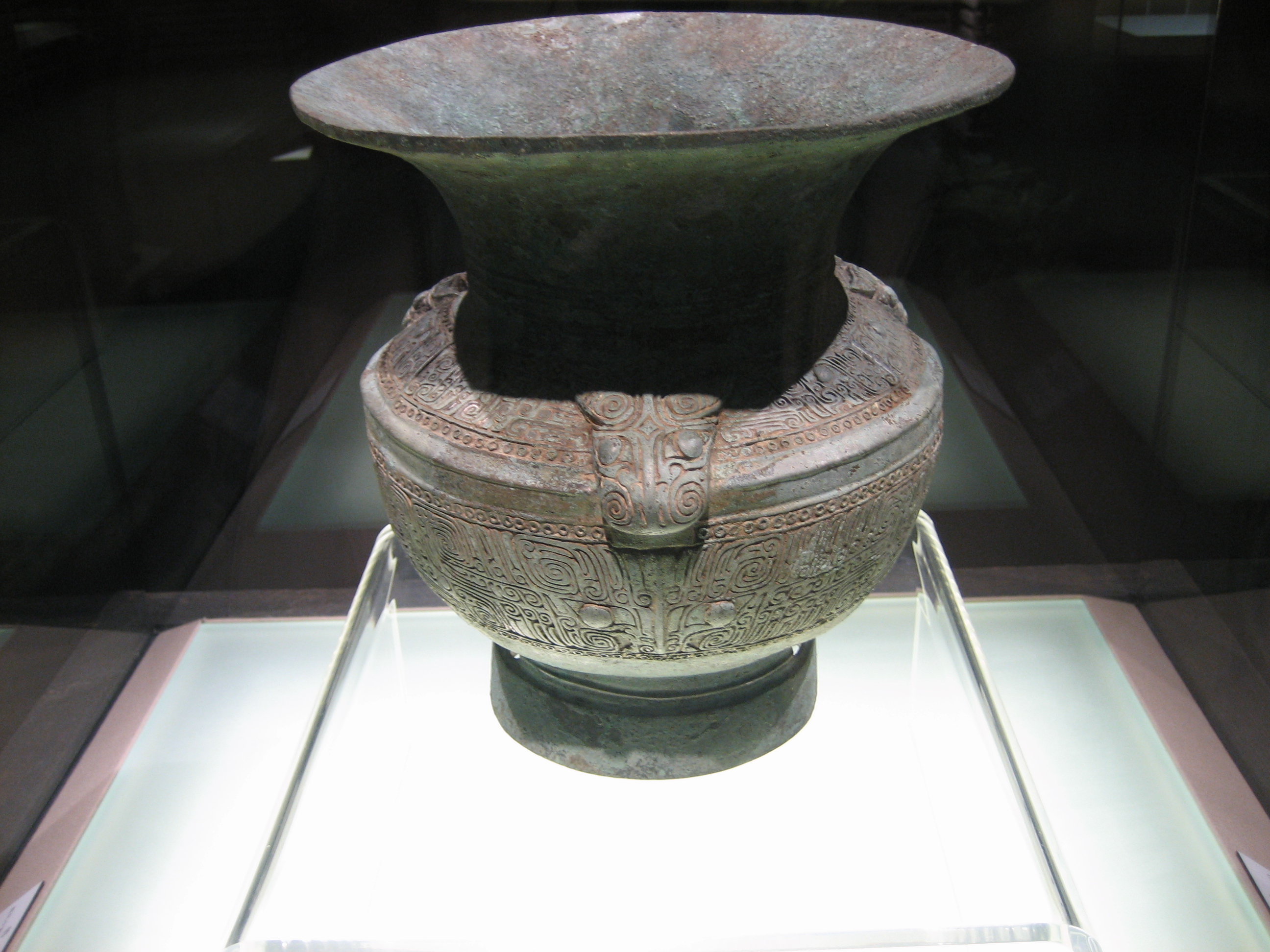
The original zun shape, with taotie, Shang

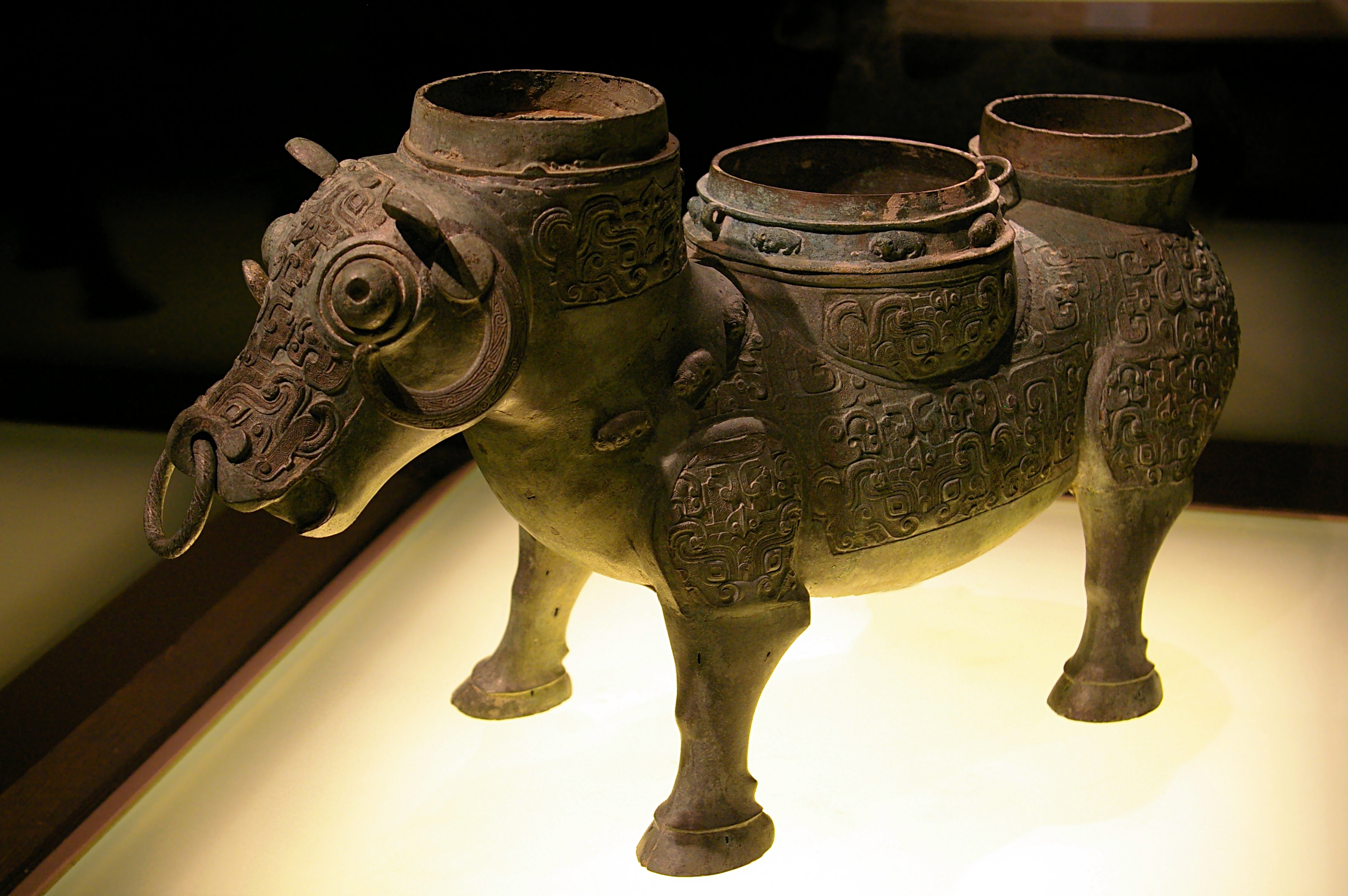
Later zun in the shape of an ox

Han dynasty bronze highlighted in The Macau Museum in Lisbon, Portugal

Zhou dynasty bronze sculpture of a dragon highlighted in The Macau Museum in Lisbon, Portugal

Shang dynasty ritual vessel highlighted in The Macau Museum in Lisbon, Portugal

=== Wine vessels ===
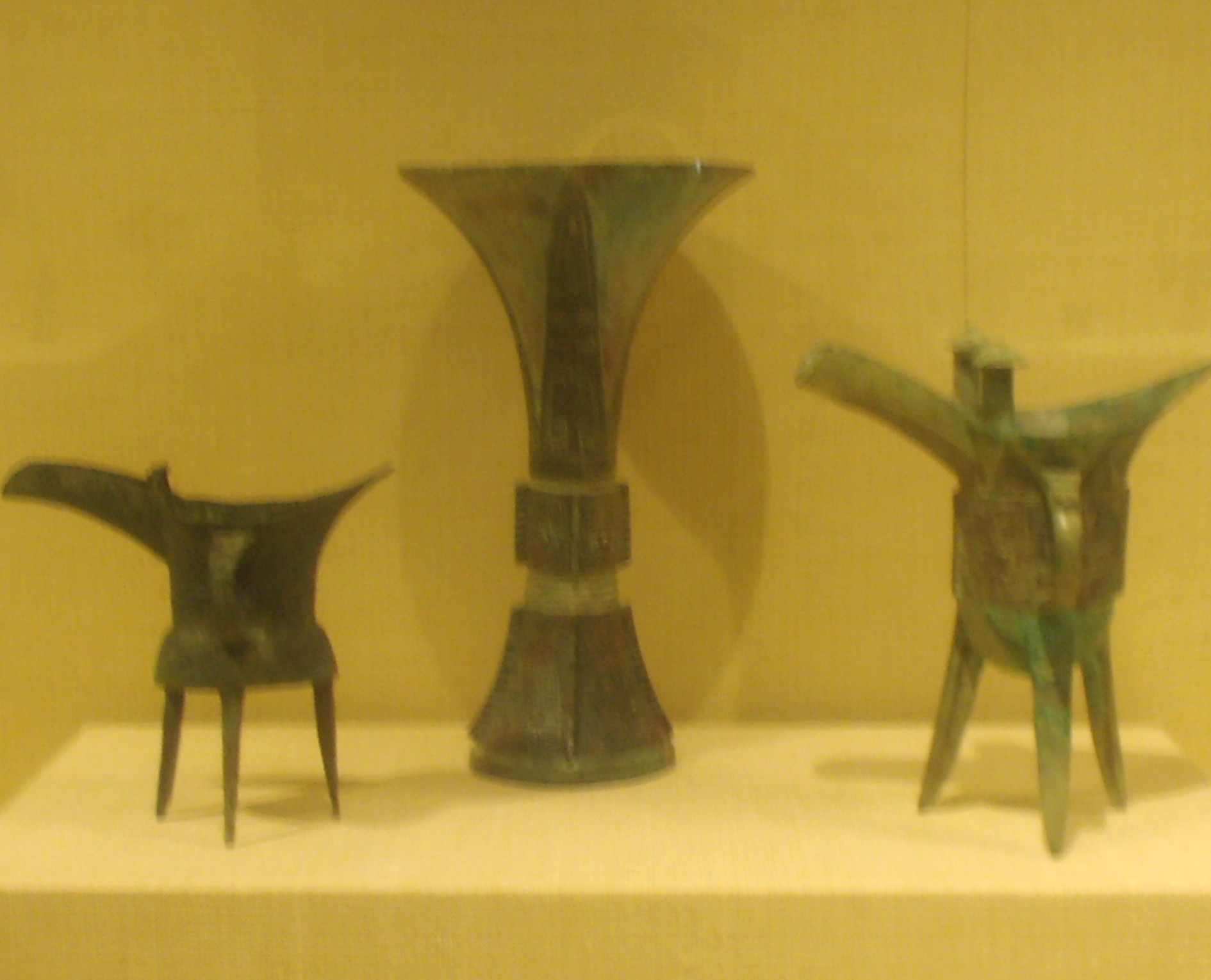
Two jué on either side of a gū, all from the Shang dynasty

- Gōng (觥, not pronounced guāng): Wine vessel often elongated and carved in the shape of an animal. There is always a cover and the mouth of the vessel usually covers the length of the vessel. This is not a classification used in the Xiqing Gujian; objects of this type are classed under 匜 (Yi (vessel)).
- Gū (觚): Tall wine cup with no handles, the mouth larger than its base.
- Guǐ (簋): A bowl with two handles.
- Hé (盉): A wine vessel shaped like a tea pot with three legs. It has a handle (pàn 鋬) and a straight spout that points diagonally upwards.
- Jiǎ (斝): A cauldron for warming wine. Like a dǐng (鼎) except the body is taller than it is broad, and it may have two sticks (柱) sticking straight up from the brim, acting as handles.
- Jué (角, not pronounced jiǎo): A wine cup similar to a 爵, except the spout and brim extension are identical and there is a cover.
- Jué (爵): A wine cup with three legs, a spout (流) with a pointed brim extension (尾) diametrically opposite, plus a handle (鋬).
- Léi (罍): Vessel for wine with a round body, a neck, a cover and a handle on either side of the mouth.
- Lì (鬲): Cauldron with three legs. Similar to a dǐng (鼎) except the legs blend into the body or have large swellings on top.
- Zhī (卮/巵/梔): Wine vessel, and also a measuring container. Like a píng (瓶), except shorter and broader.
- Zhōng (鍾): A wine vessel with no handles.
- Zun (尊/樽/鐏): Wine vessel and sacrificial vessel (器為盛酒亦祭用也). Tall cylindrical wine cup, with no handles or legs. The mouth is usually slightly broader than the body. In the late Zhou, this type of vessel became exceedingly elaborate, often taking the shape of animals and abandoning the traditional shape. These later types are distinguished from gōng (觥) by retaining a small, roughly circular mouth. This type of vessel forms the second largest group of objects in the Xiqing gujian, after the dǐng (鼎).
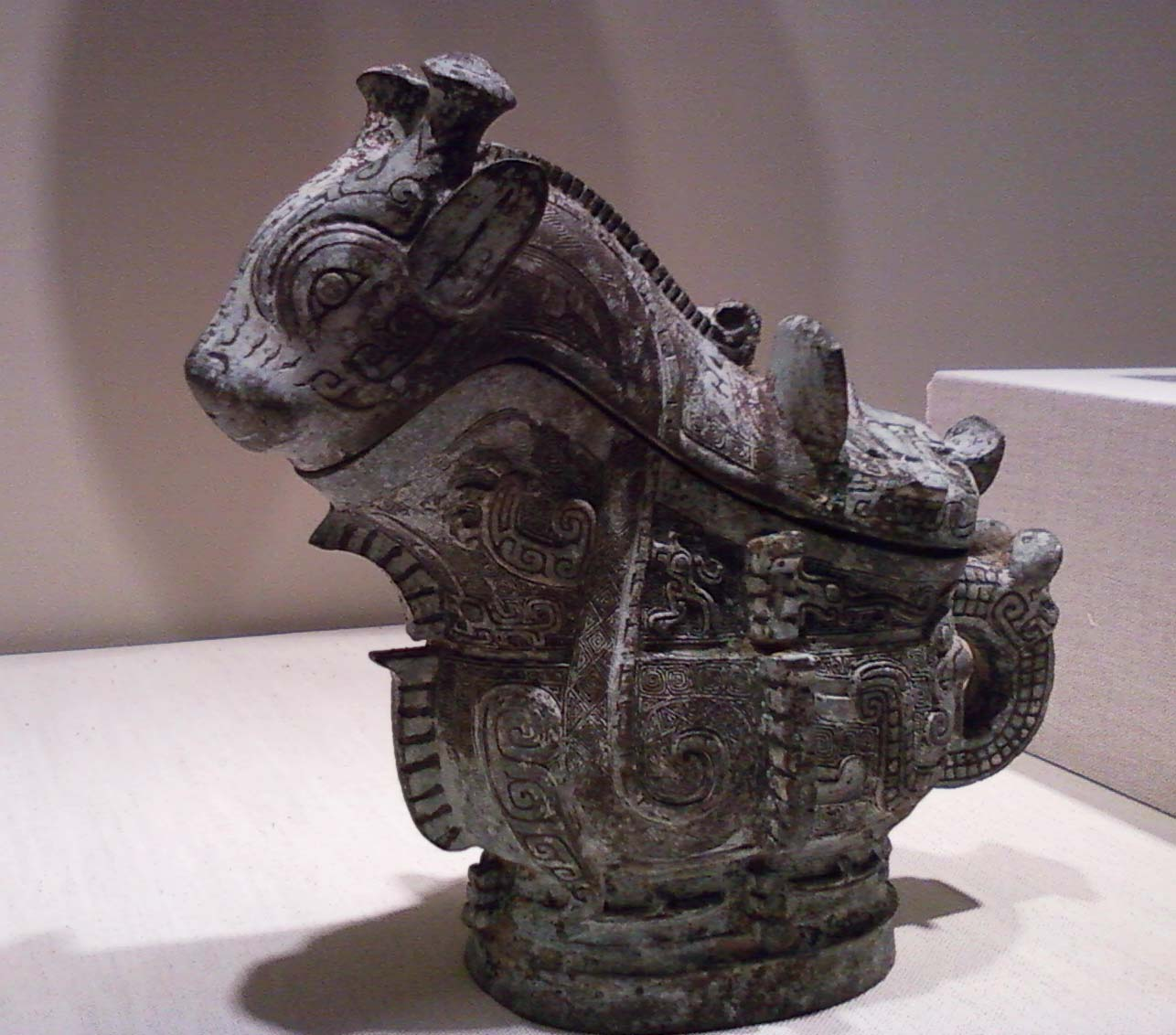
Ritual wine server (guang), Indianapolis Museum of Art, 60.43

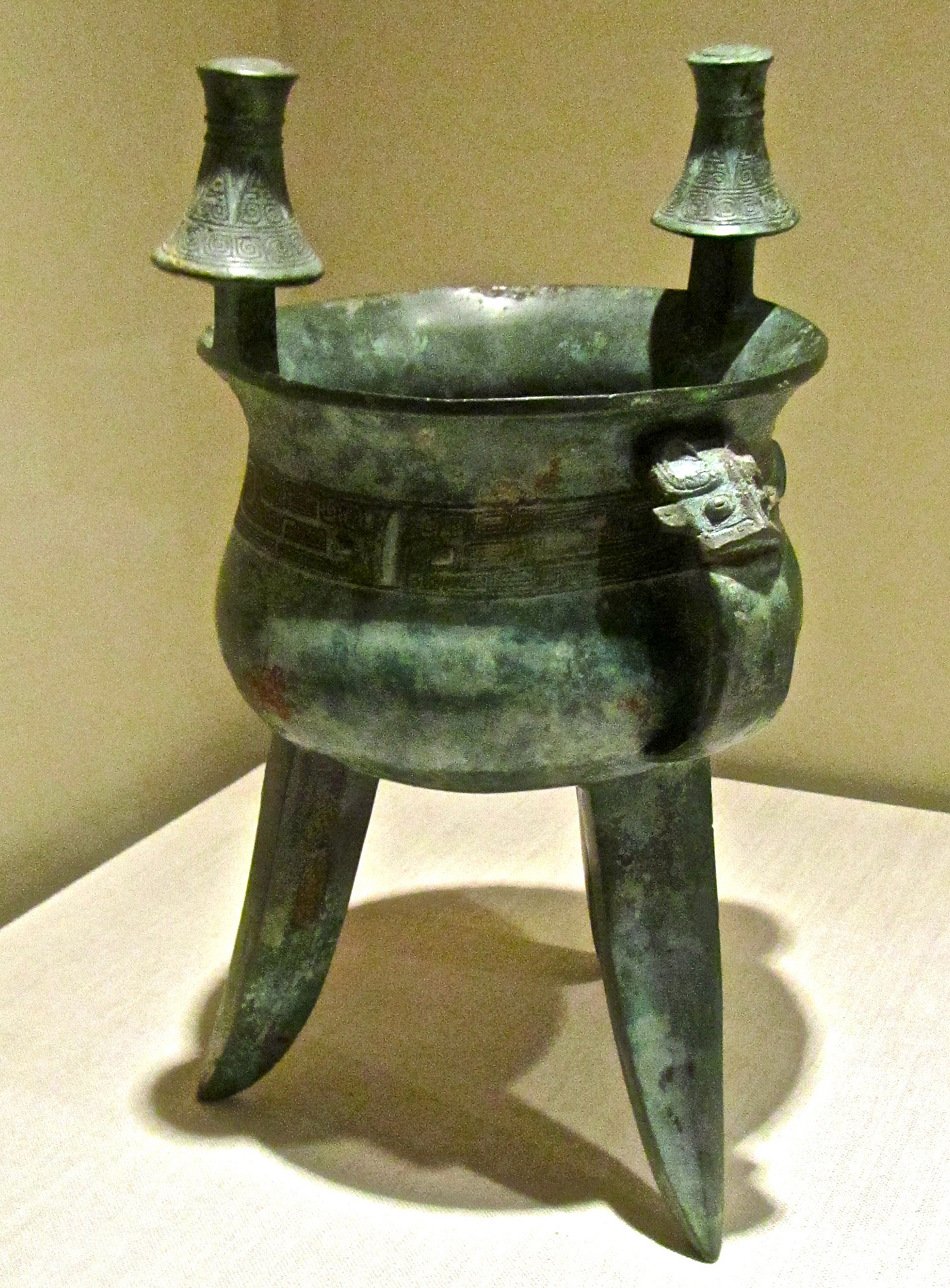
Shang Jiǎ

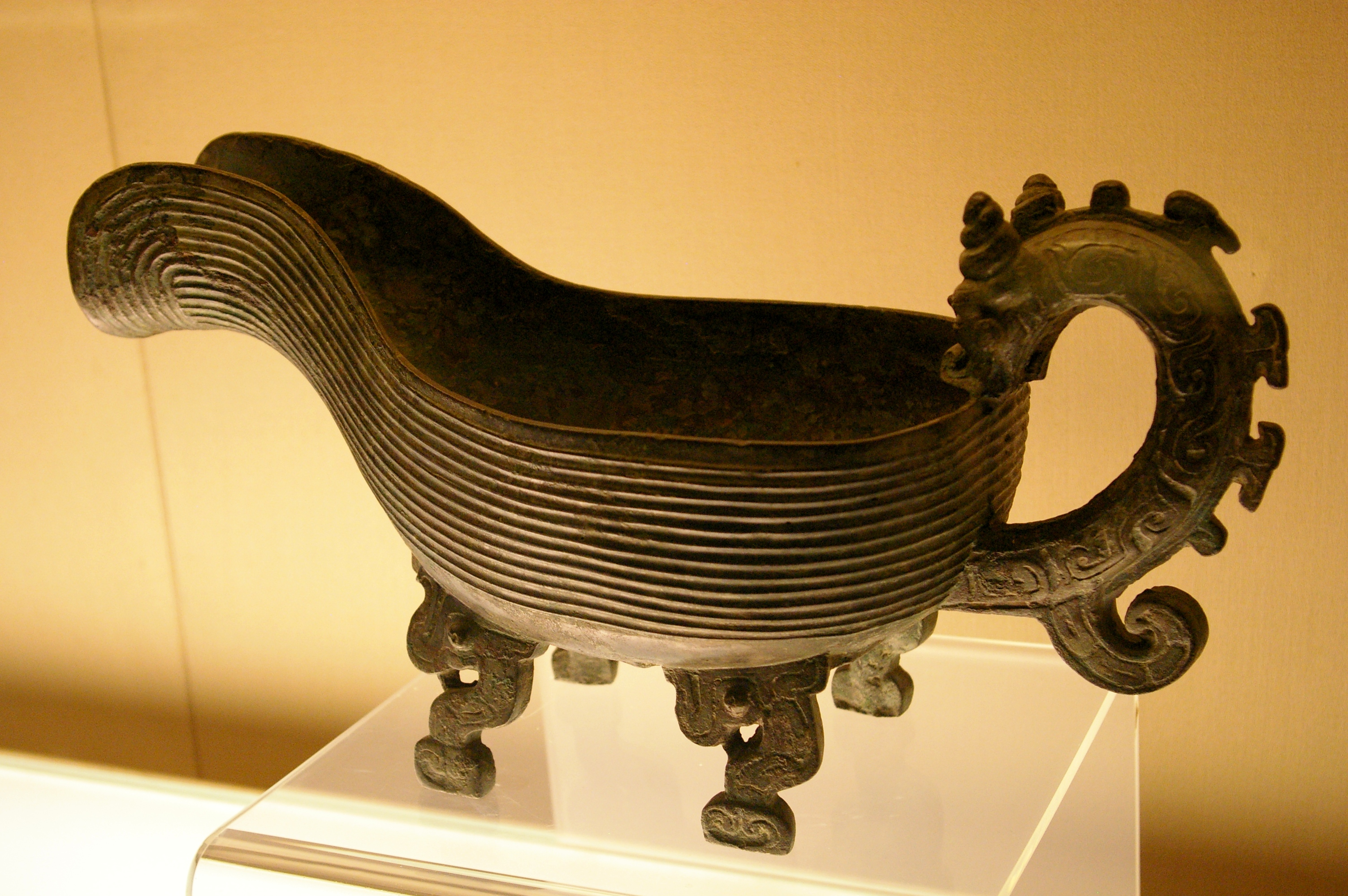
Zhou water pourer Yí, from the Tomb of Marquis Yi of Zeng

=== Food vessels ===
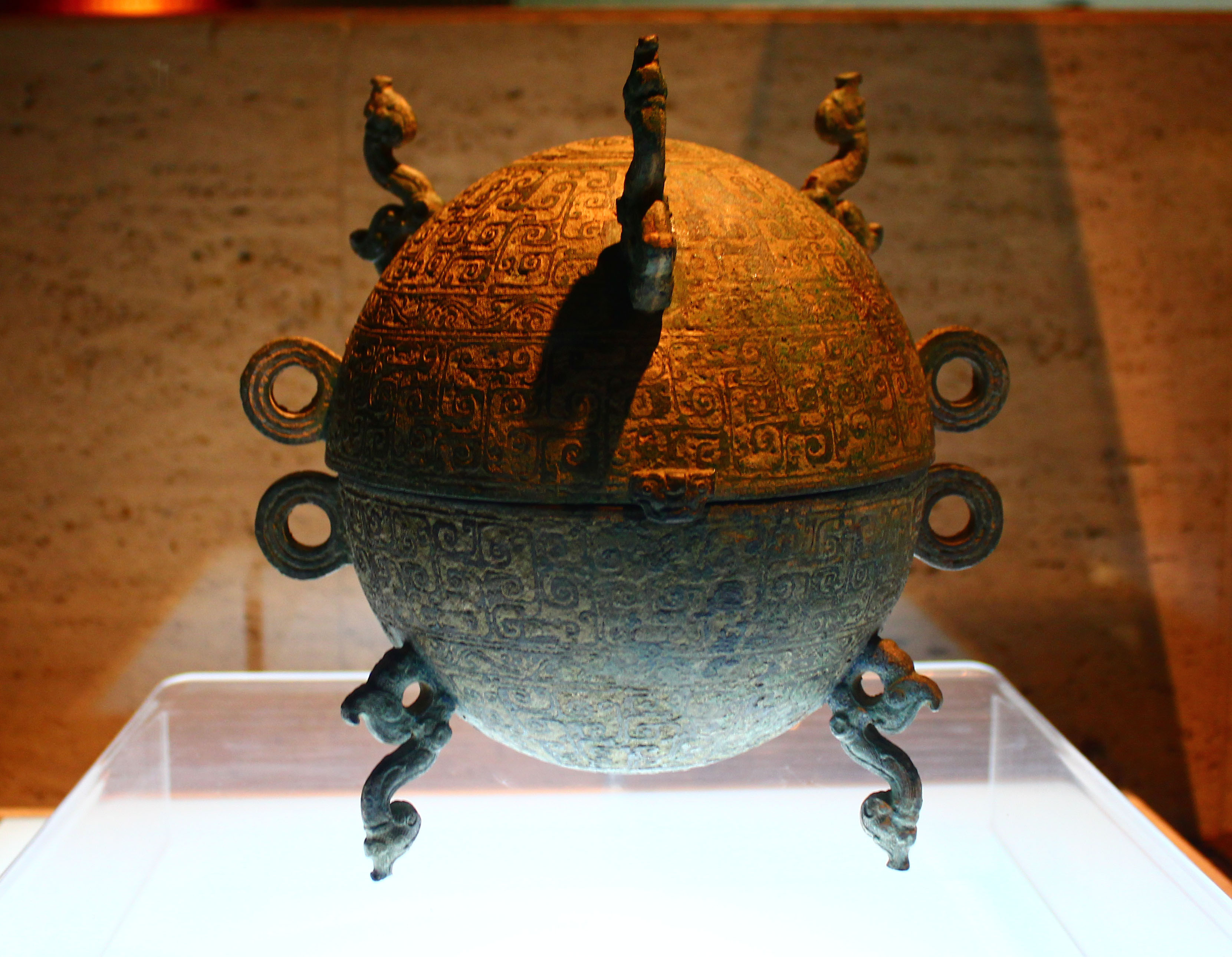
Dui vessel with geometric cloud pattern, Warring States period, Hubei Provincial Museum.

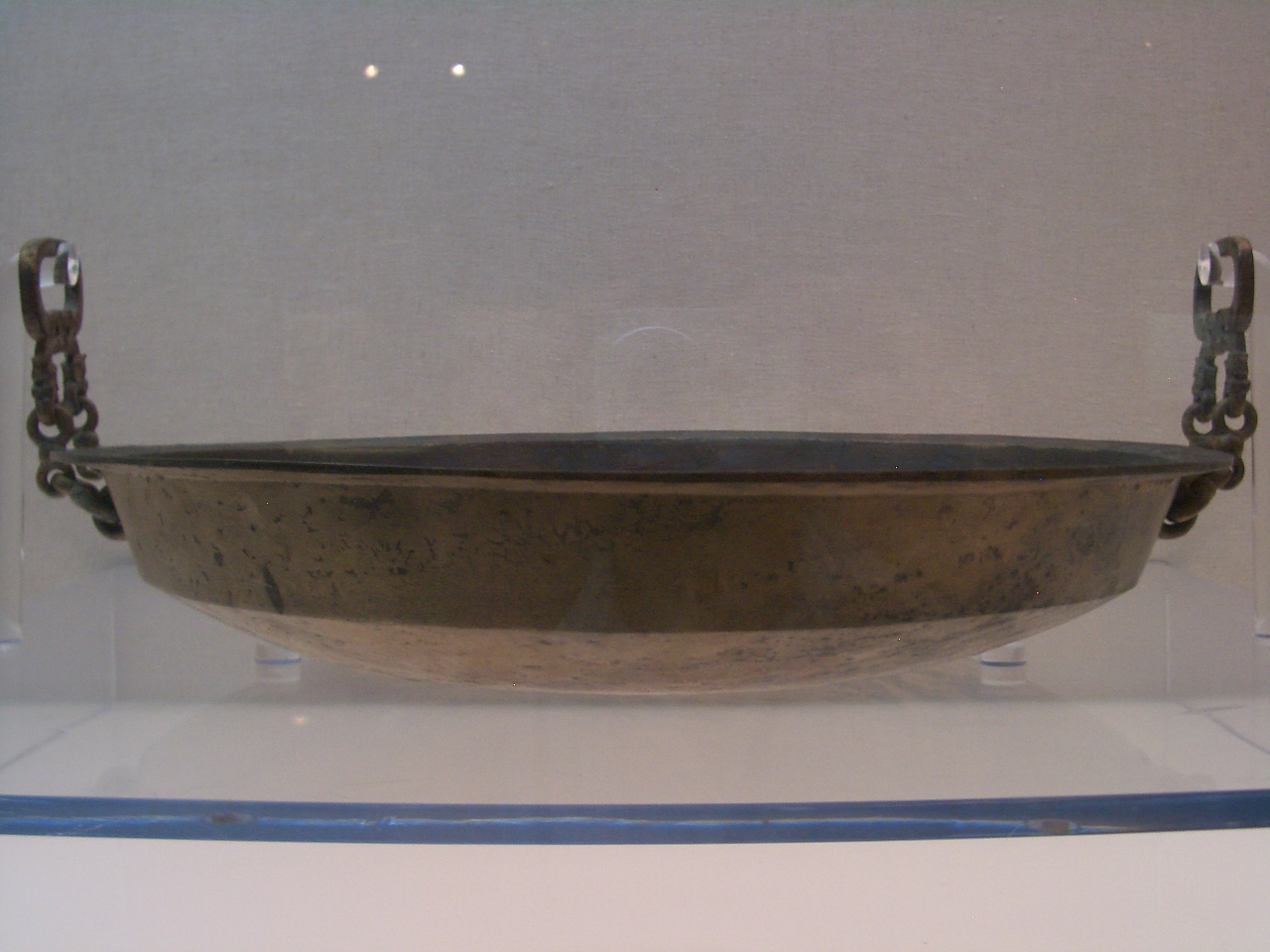
Pan food vessel, here in a legless style

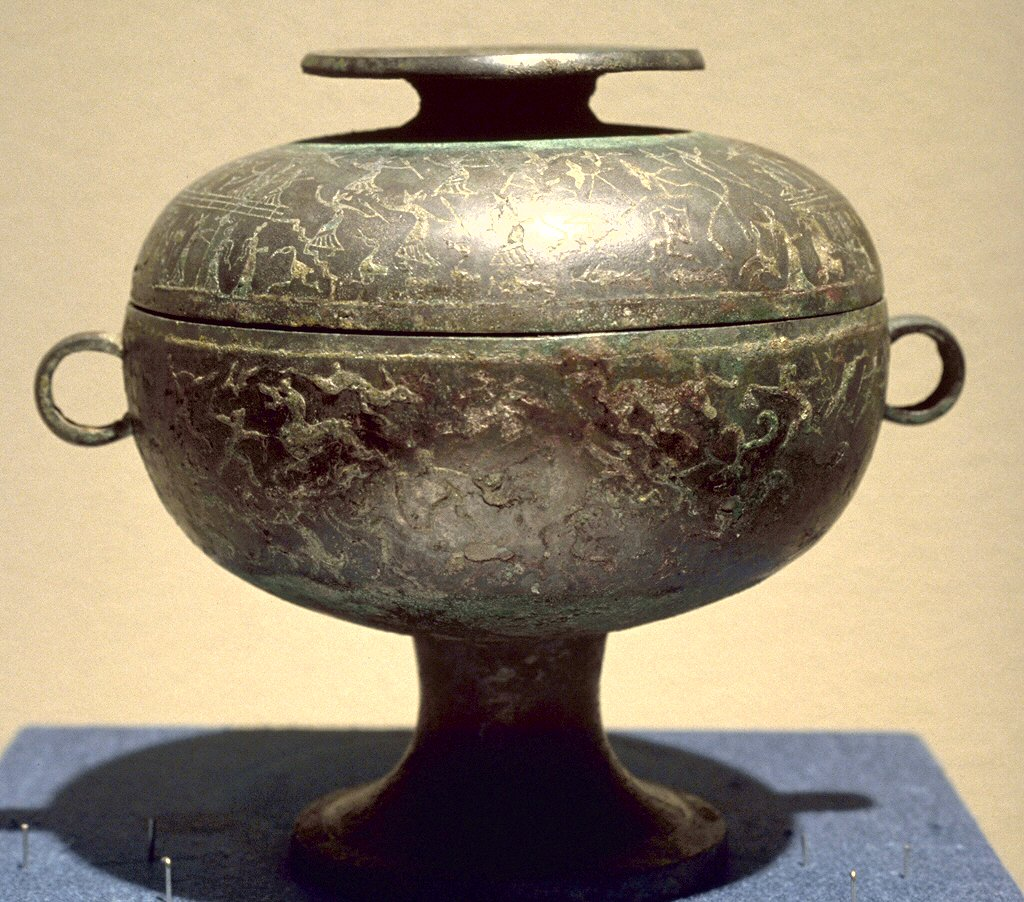
Covered Food Container (dou), 6th Century B.C. The Walters Art Museum.

- Duì (敦, not pronounced dūn): Spherical dish with a cover to protect its contents from dust and other contaminants.
- Pán (盤): Round curved dish for food. May have no legs, or it may have three or four short legs.
- Yǒu (卣): Covered pot with a single looping handle attached on opposite sides of the mouth of the vessel.
- Zèng (甑): A rice pot; referred to as a 腹 fù in Xiqing gujian. Has no separate category in 西清古鑑: see yǎn (甗).

=== Water vessels ===
- Bù (瓿): see pǒu (瓿)
- Dǒu 斗: Scoop. Tall bowl with a long handle.
- Móu (鍪): A vase with two handles. Vessels of this type are classed as hú (壺) in the Xiqing gujian.
- Píng (瓶): Tall vase with a long slender neck opening up to a narrow mouth.
- Pǒu (瓿, pronounced bù in China): A small bronze wèng (甕).
- Wèng (瓮 or 甕): Round mouthed, round bellied jar with no foot for holding water or wine. Now commonly used to hold ashes.
- Yàndī (硯滴): Water container for an ink stone; often in the shape of an animal with a long thin dropper to control the amount of water dispensed.
- Yí (匜): A bowl or ewer with a spout; May be elaborately shaped like an animal.
- Yú (盂): Basin for water. May have up to four decorative handles around the edge; no brim.
- Zhì (觶): Broad-mouthed vase, similar in shape to a hú (壺), but with no handles.
- Zhōng (盅): Small cup with no handles. Not represented in Xiqing gujian.

=== Musical instruments ===
- Bó (鈸): Cymbals. Not represented in the Xiqing gujian.
- Gǔ (鼓): A drum.
- Líng (鈴): A small bell (as might be hung from ribbons). This item is not represented in Xiqing gujian.
- Náo (鐃): A clapperless bell with its opening facing upwards, often with a thin, cylindrical base. Not represented in the Xiqing gujian. See also zhōng.
- Zhōng (鐘): A large bell with its opening facing downwards, often hung from a frame like in a tower. See also náo.

=== Weapons ===
- Duì (鐓, not pronounced dūn): Bronze decoration for the end of a spear or halberd handle; often with an animal motif.
- Jiàn (劍): A sword. There are only three examples in Xiqing gujian.
- Nǔjī (弩機): Crossbow mechanism. There are only two examples in the Xiqing gujian.
- Pī (鈹): A type of sword.
- Zú (鏃): An arrow head.

=== Measuring containers ===
- Zhī (卮 or 巵 or 梔): A wine vessel and also a measuring container. Like a píng (瓶), except shorter and broader.

=== Ancient money ===
- Bù (布) or bùwén (布文): Ancient money (錢幣). Rectangular with two legs and a head. Type of qián (錢)
- Fúyìnqián (符印錢): Taoist amulet minted in the shape of a yuán (圓), usually with an incantation on the obverse and picture on the reverse.
- Qián (錢): Ancient money (錢幣). Well represented in 西清古鑑; occurs in three types: 布, 刀, 圓(元) q.v.
- Yuán (圓): Also called yuánbì (圓幣), yuánbǎo (元寶), or yuánqián (元錢). Circular coins with a hole in the middle, usually made of copper or bronze; what most Westerners think of as 'Chinese money'. Also see fúyìnqián (符印錢).

=== Miscellaneous ===
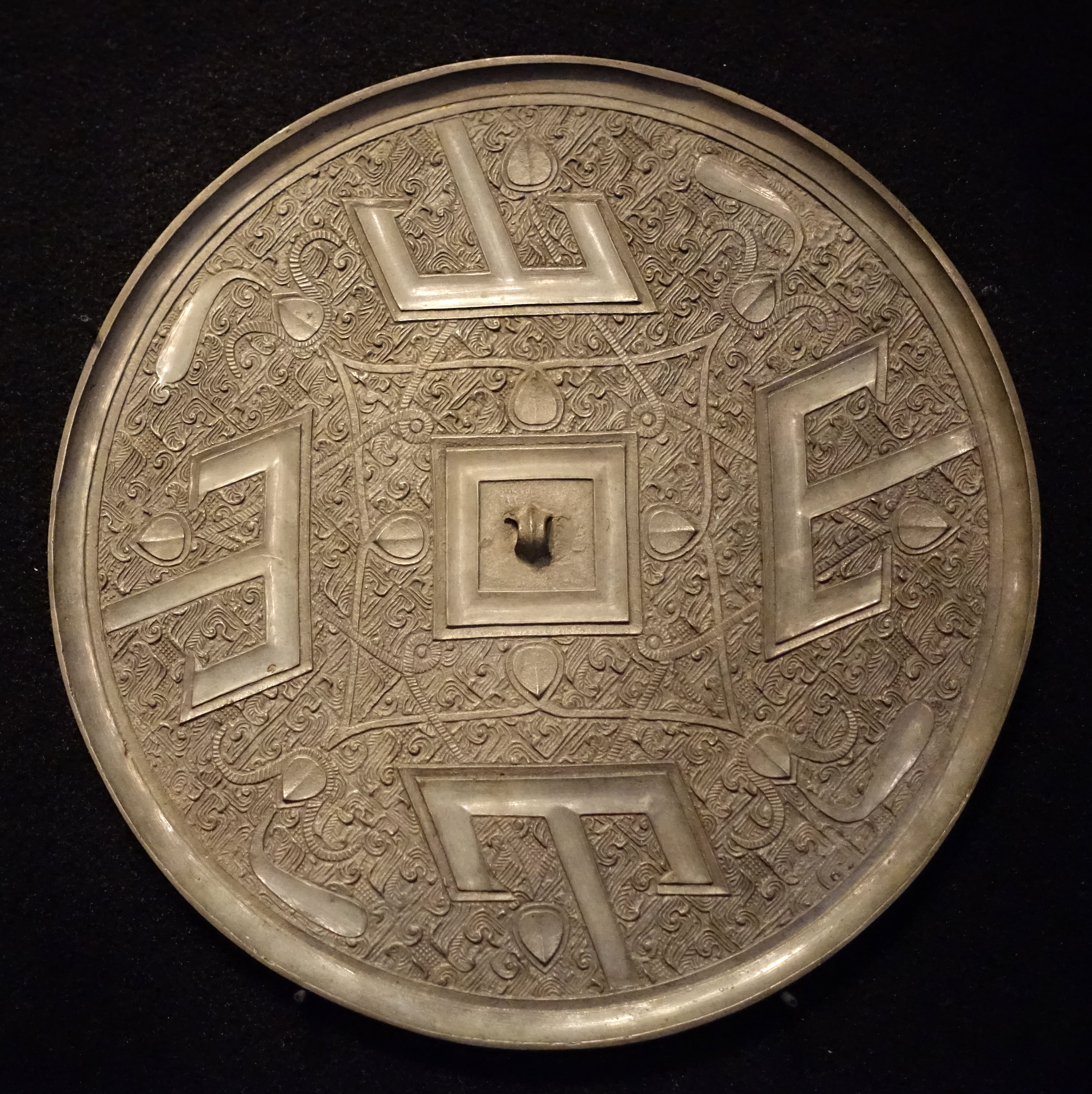
A jian bronze mirror from the Warring States period (475–221 BC)

- Biǎozuò (表座) Cylindrical container with added animal motif. There are only three examples in the Xiqing gujian.
- Jiàn (鑑 or 鑒): Refers to two different objects: either a tall, broad bronze dish for water, or a circular bronze mirror, usually with intricate ornamentation on the back. The modern meaning is a mirror.
- Jué (钁): Farming implement shaped like a pickaxe, but used as a hoe. 西清古鑑 contains only two examples; the rubric states: 按說文大鉏也又博雅斫謂之钁 "According to the Shouwen [an ancient Chinese dictionary] it is a large hoe, that is called a jué by the learned." Only the bronze heads of the two examples survive, because the wooden handles have long rotted away.
- Lú (鑪): A brazier. These are a nebulously classified group of bronze vessels and there are a number of forms: A. It may similar to a dǐng (鼎) with very short legs sitting on a pán (盤); or B., a duì (敦) on a pán (盤); or C., like a dòu (豆) on a pán (盤).
- Shūzhèn (書鎮): Paper weight. Usually solid bronze, moulded in the shape of a reclining or crouching animal (three recorded in Xiqing gujian).
- Xǔ (盨): A vessel with two ears and lid, serving as a food container (may not appear in the "Imperial Collection").

== Patterns and decoration ==
=== Taotie ===
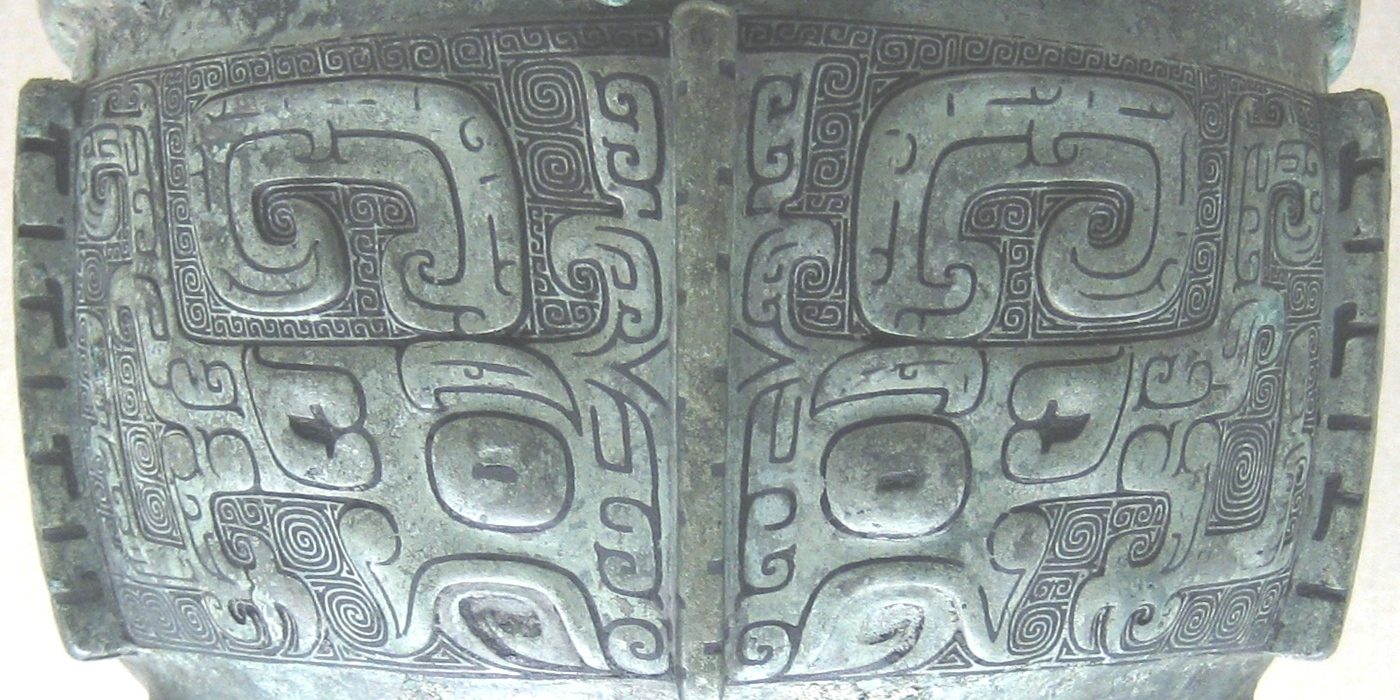
Taotie on a ding from late Shang dynasty

The taotie pattern was a popular bronze-ware decorative design in the Shang and Zhou dynasties, named by scholars of the Song dynasty (960–1279) after a monster on Zhou ding vessels with a head but no body mentioned in Master Lü's Spring and Autumn Annals (239 BC).

The earliest form of the taotie on bronzeware, dating from early in the Erligang period, consists of a pair of eyes with some subsidiary lines stretching to the left and right. The motif was soon elaborated as a frontal view of a face with oval eyes and mouth, continuing on each side into a side view of a body. It reached its full development as a monster mask at around the time of king Wu Ding, early in the Late Shang period.

The typical taotie pattern is usually interpreted as a full-face round-eyed animal face ("mask"), with sharp teeth and horns, although the degree to which this was the intended meaning is sometimes disputed. In all of these patterns, the eyes are always the focus. The huge eyes leave an awesome impression on viewers even from a distance. The taotie pattern features rich variations from one bronze piece to another because one ceramic mould could only cast one bronze work in the early days of casting. The patterns are normally symmetrical around the vertical axis, and the lower jaw area is missing. The most obvious difference between taotie patterns are the "horns", if that is what indeed they are. Some have shapes interpreted as ox horns, some sheep horns, and some have tiger's ears.

=== Pre-Zhou stylistic development ===
Beginning in the 1930s and culminating in 1953, the art historian Max Loehr identified a developmental sequence of five decorative styles found on pre-Zhou bronze vessels. The vessels Loehr worked with were unprovenanced, but he assumed that they had all originated from the Late Shang site of Yinxu (in modern Anyang), the only site that had been excavated by that time. When subsequent excavations at various sites yielded vessels with archaeological context, his sequence was confirmed. However, the timescale was longer than he had envisaged, beginning in Phase III of the Erlitou period and reaching his Style V early in the Late Shang period.

In Loehr's Style I, vessels were decorated with lines carved into the mould, which the piece-mould process made accessible. This produced thin raised lines on the cast object. Because the design was carved on the pieces of the mould, it was naturally divided into sections. Subdivision of the design would persist through the later styles, even when carving the design on the model made it no longer a technical necessity. The principal motif used with this style was the taotie. Loehr identified this style as the first because he found it used on the crudest vessels. This style accounts for all the decorated bronzes found at Erlitou and some from the succeeding Erligang period.

In Style II, the thickness of the raised lines is varied. This could have been achieved either by painting the pattern on the mould and carving out the ink-covered areas, or by painting on the model and carving the areas between. In addition to the taotie, a second motif used was a one-eyed animal seen in profile, usually identified as a dragon. The Erligang period is characterized by Style II, along with late Style I and early Style III.

Style III began as a smooth development from Style II, with no clear separation. The patterns increased in complexity and spread over more of the vessel's surface. Many new designs and variations of relief were introduced. As the designs became more elaborate, they were carried out exclusively on the model. Unlike the raised surfaces, the sunken lines are all of the same width, suggesting that they were carved on the model with a particular tool. It was at this time that Central Plains bronze techniques spread over a wide area, and new regional styles emerged in the Yangtze valley. The style became fully developed in the period between the Erligang culture and the Late Shang. Late Style III objects introduced undulating relief to make the elaborate designs more readable.

Style IV represents an abrupt switch to a new method to make the design intelligible. Instead of carving the whole design with uniform grooves of consistent density, motifs are represented with a low density of lines, contrasting with a high density of thinner lines representing the ground. The ground areas were eventually filled with fine spirals known as léiwén 雷文. The motifs now had a clear shape, and the imaginary taotie and dragon were joined by images of birds and animals from nature.

Style V built on Style IV, raising the motif in high relief to further emphasize the contrast with the ground. Raised flanges were used to mark subdivisions of the design. The bronze vessels recovered from the tomb of Fu Hao, consort of the Late Shang king Wu Ding, are decorated in Style V. Some traditions from the Yangtze region feature high relief without léiwén, suggesting that they represent independent developments from Style III.

Examples of Loehr's developmental sequence of decorative styles

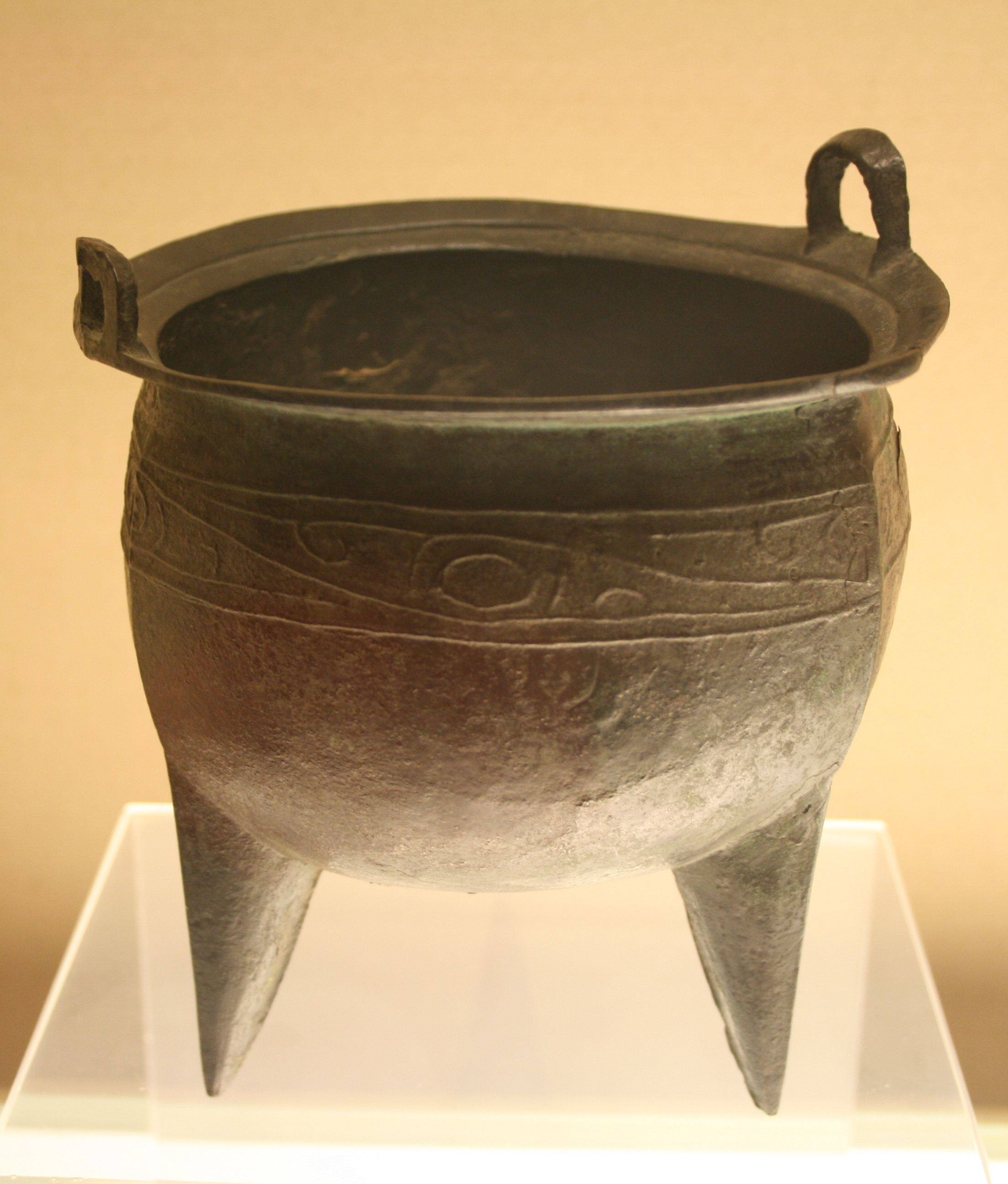
Dǐng, Style I

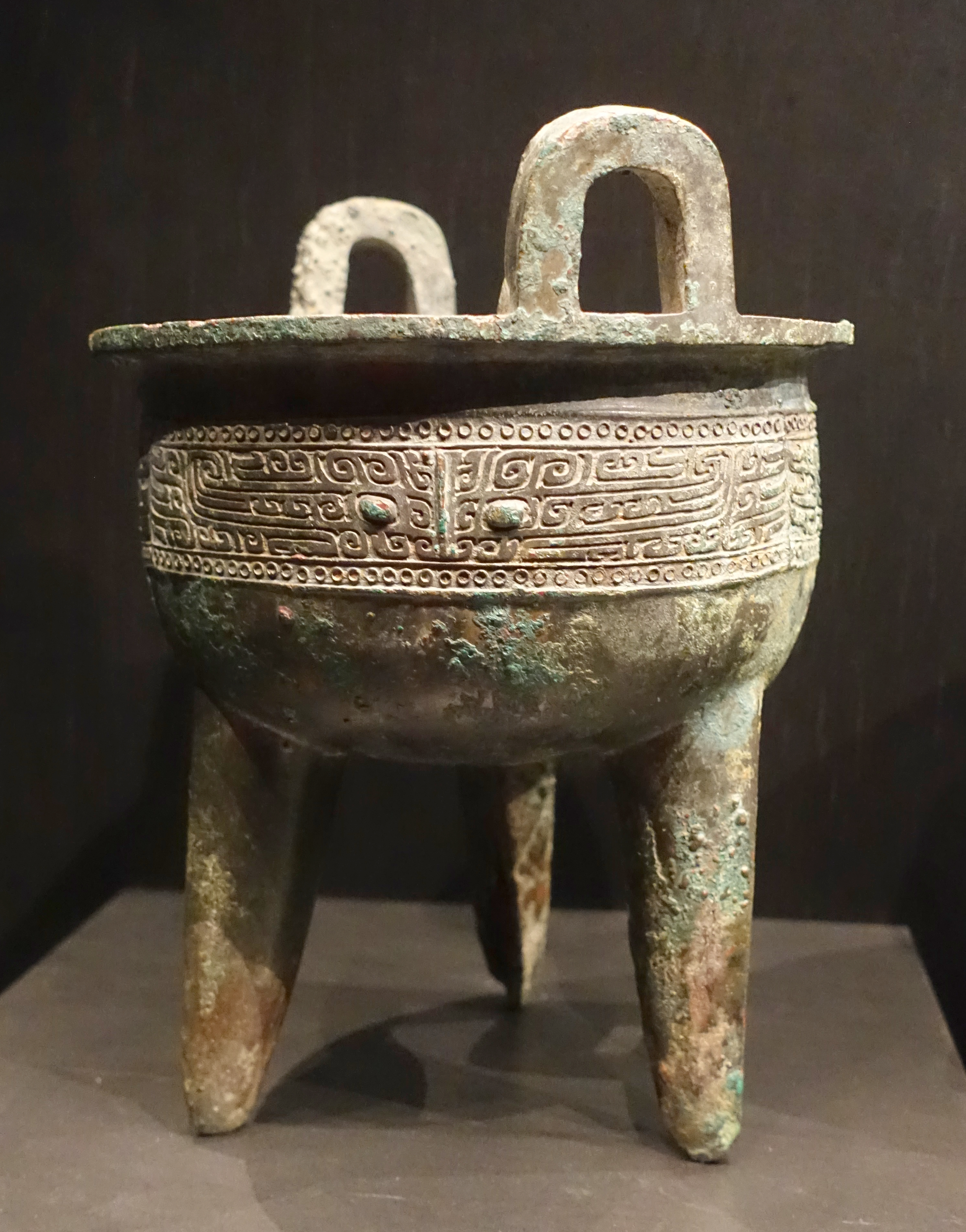
Dǐng, Style II

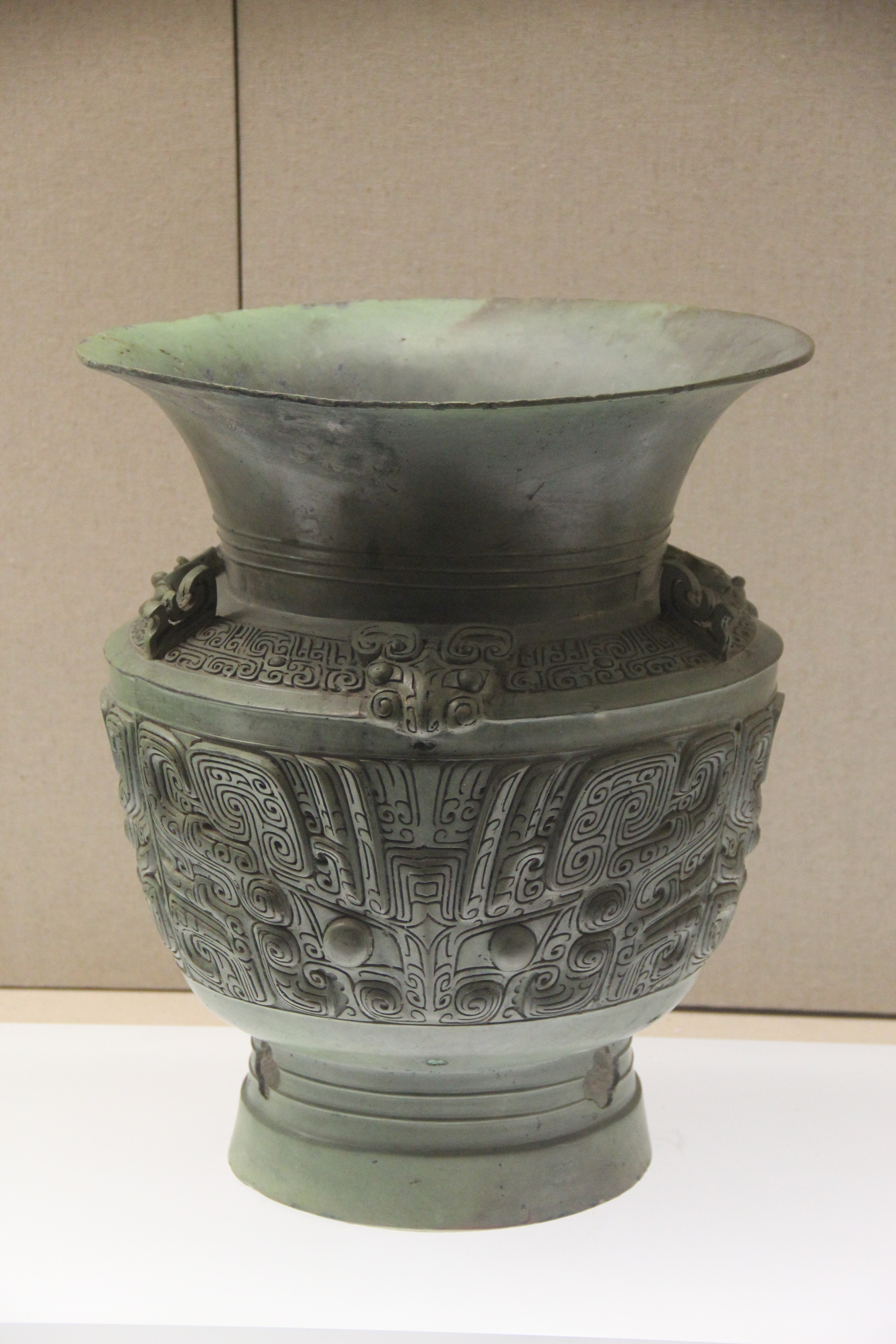
Zūn, Style III

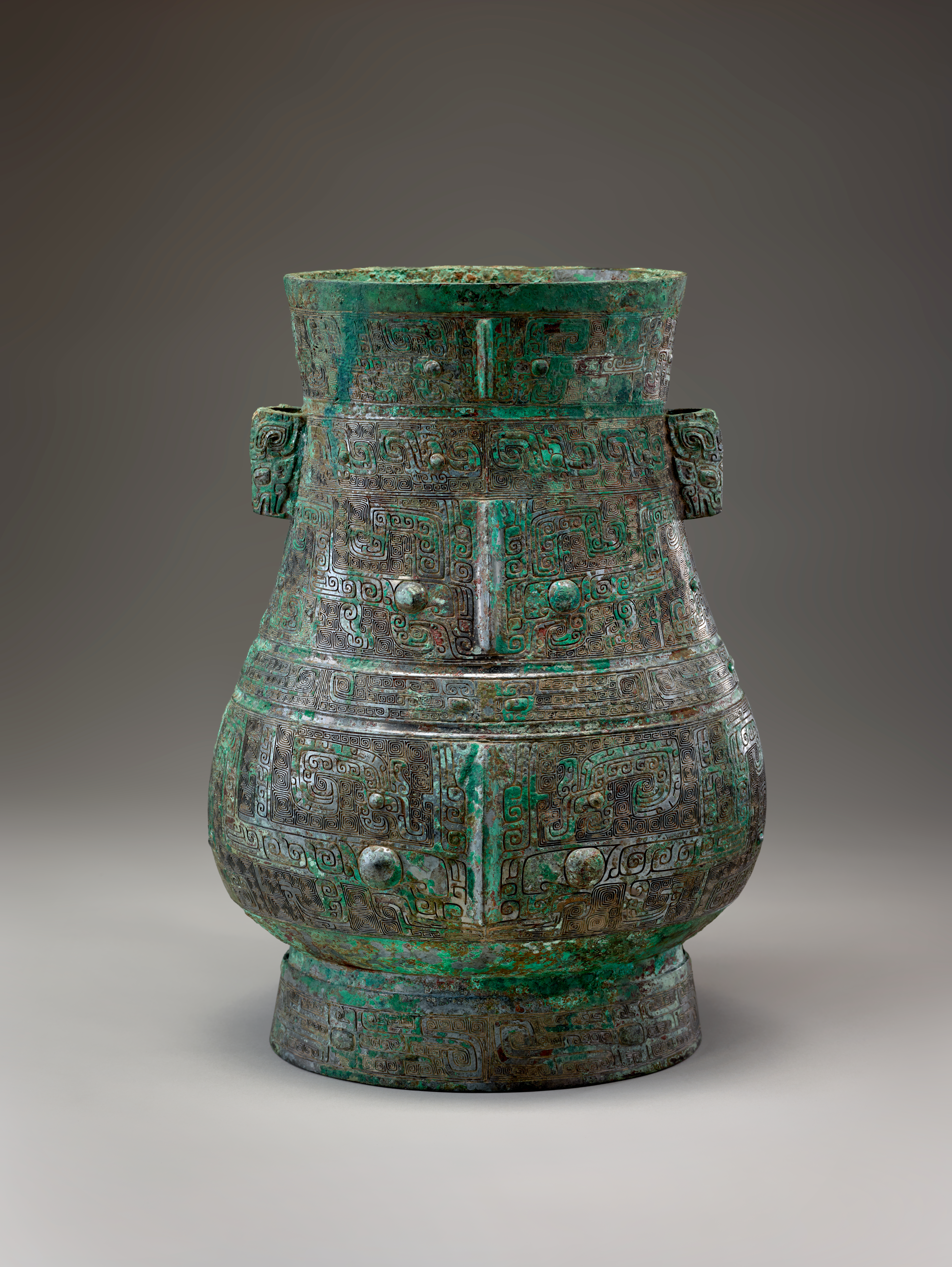
Hú, Style IV

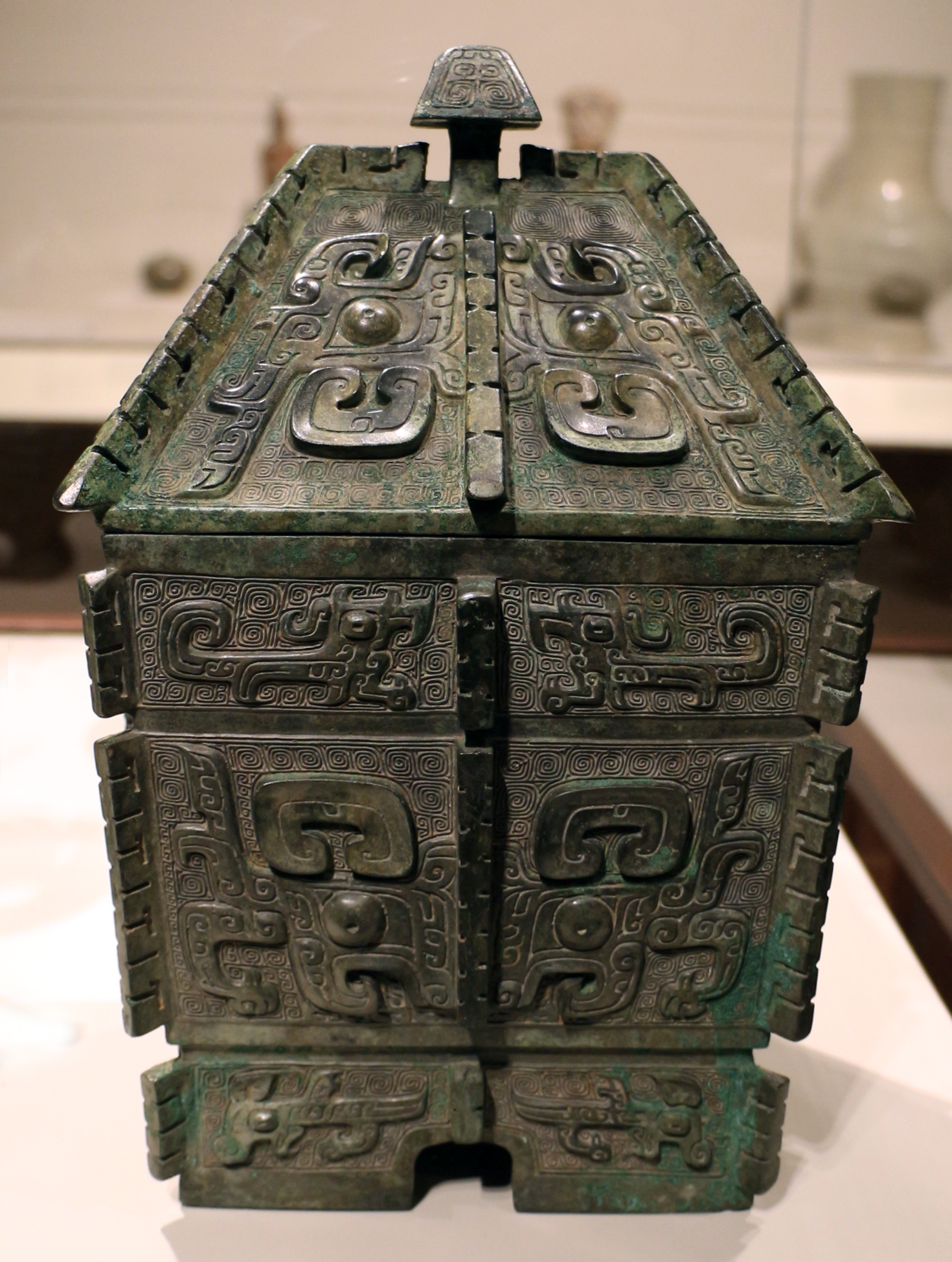
Fāngyí, Style V
Vessels from Hunan, 13th–11th centuries BC

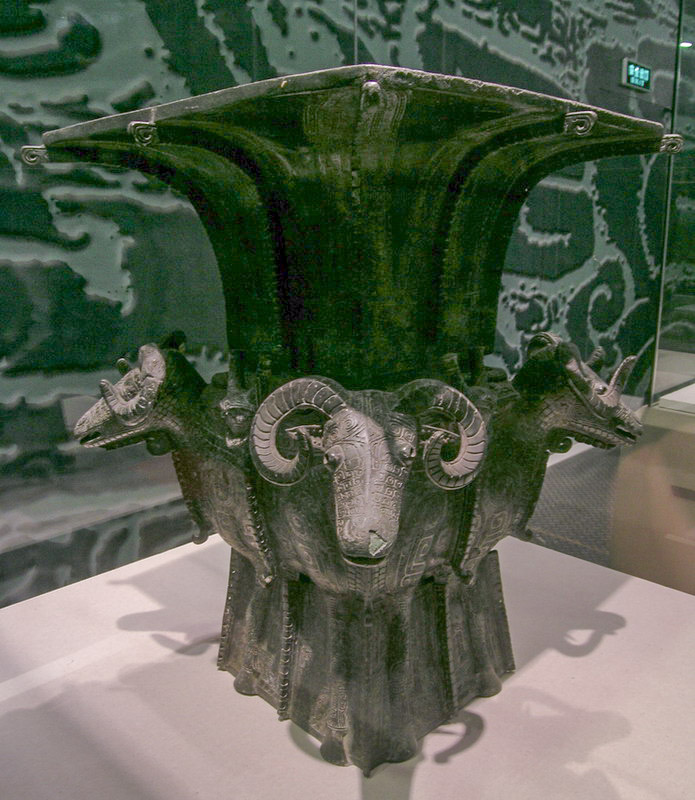
Four-ram square zūn

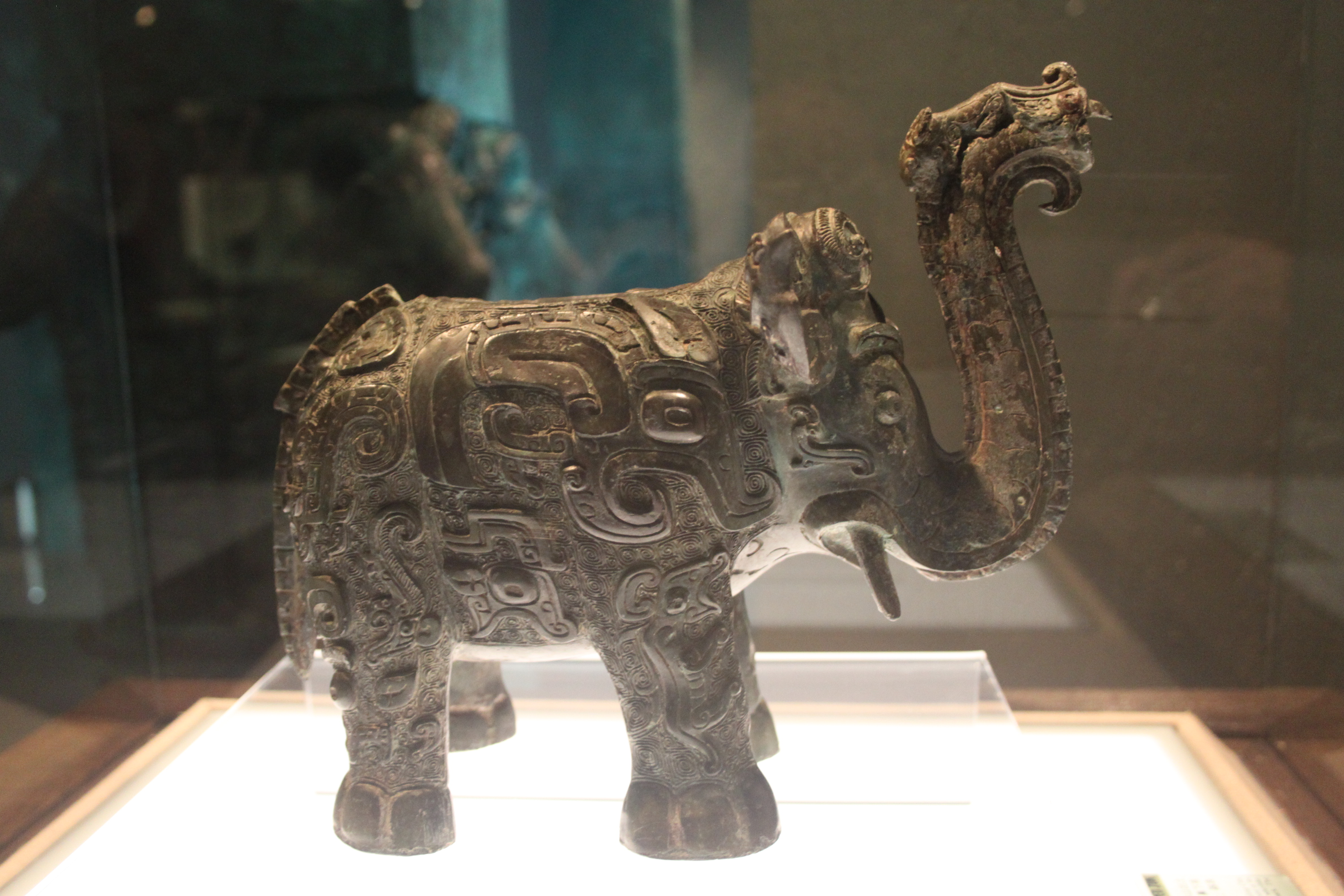
Elephant zūn

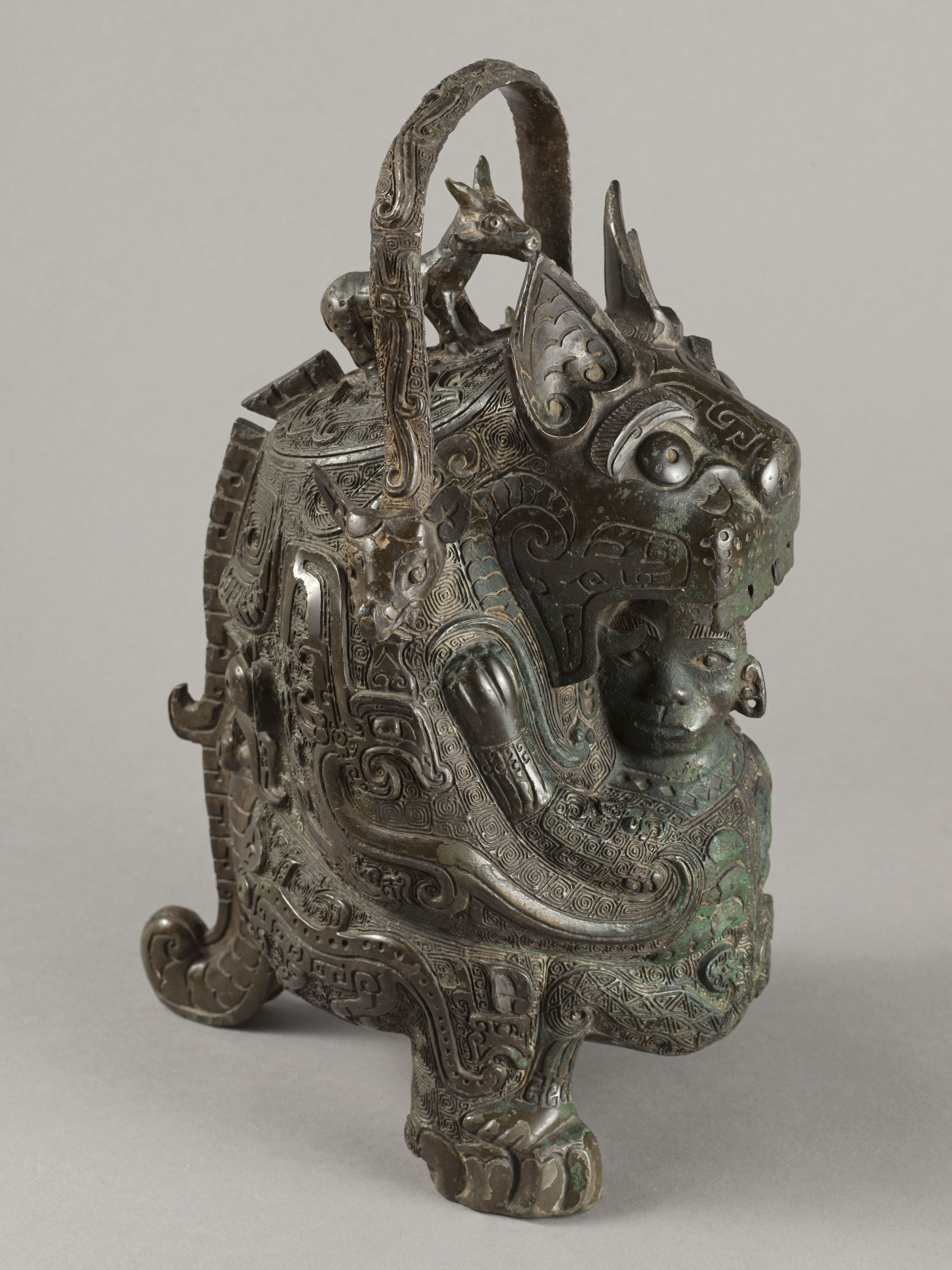
Yǒu in the shape of a tiger

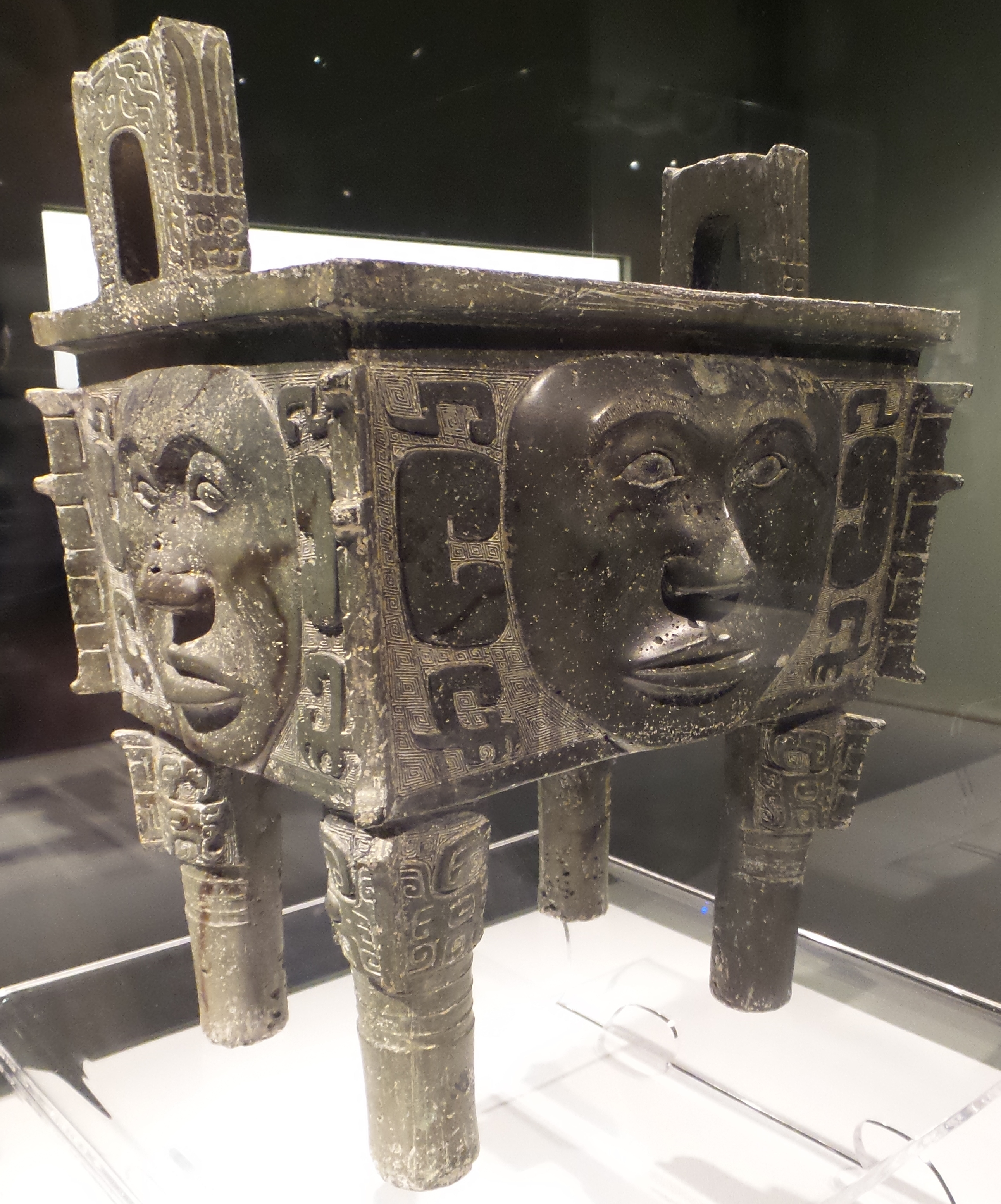
Da He dǐng

=== Western Zhou styles ===
Western Zhou vessels may be divided into early, middle and late periods based on their form, decoration and the types of vessels preferred. The most common vessels throughout the period were the guǐ basin and dǐng cauldron. They were also the vessels most likely to carry long inscriptions.

Vessels of the early Western Zhou were elaborations of Late Shang designs, featuring high-relief decor, often with pronounced flanges, and made extensive use of the taotie motif. Jué, jiǎ and gū wine vessels continued to be produced, but would largely disappear in later periods. Yǒu and zūn were usually cast in matching sets. The earliest guǐ were elevated on a base. Over time, vessels became less flamboyant.

By the mid-10th century BC (middle Western Zhou), the taotie had been replaced by pairs of long-tailed birds facing each other. Vessels shrank, and their profile became simpler. New types were the hú vase, zhōng bell and xǔ vessel. Guǐ vessels of this period tend to have covers.

New types of vessel began to be introduced during the early 9th century BC, initially in western Shaanxi, then quickly spreading to the central part of the province. These new types, which were grouped in large sets, possibly reflect a change in Zhou ritual practice. Animal decorations were replaced by geometric forms such as ribbing and bands of lozenge shapes. Conversely, legs and handles became larger and more elaborate, and were often topped with animal heads.

Western Zhou guǐ vessels

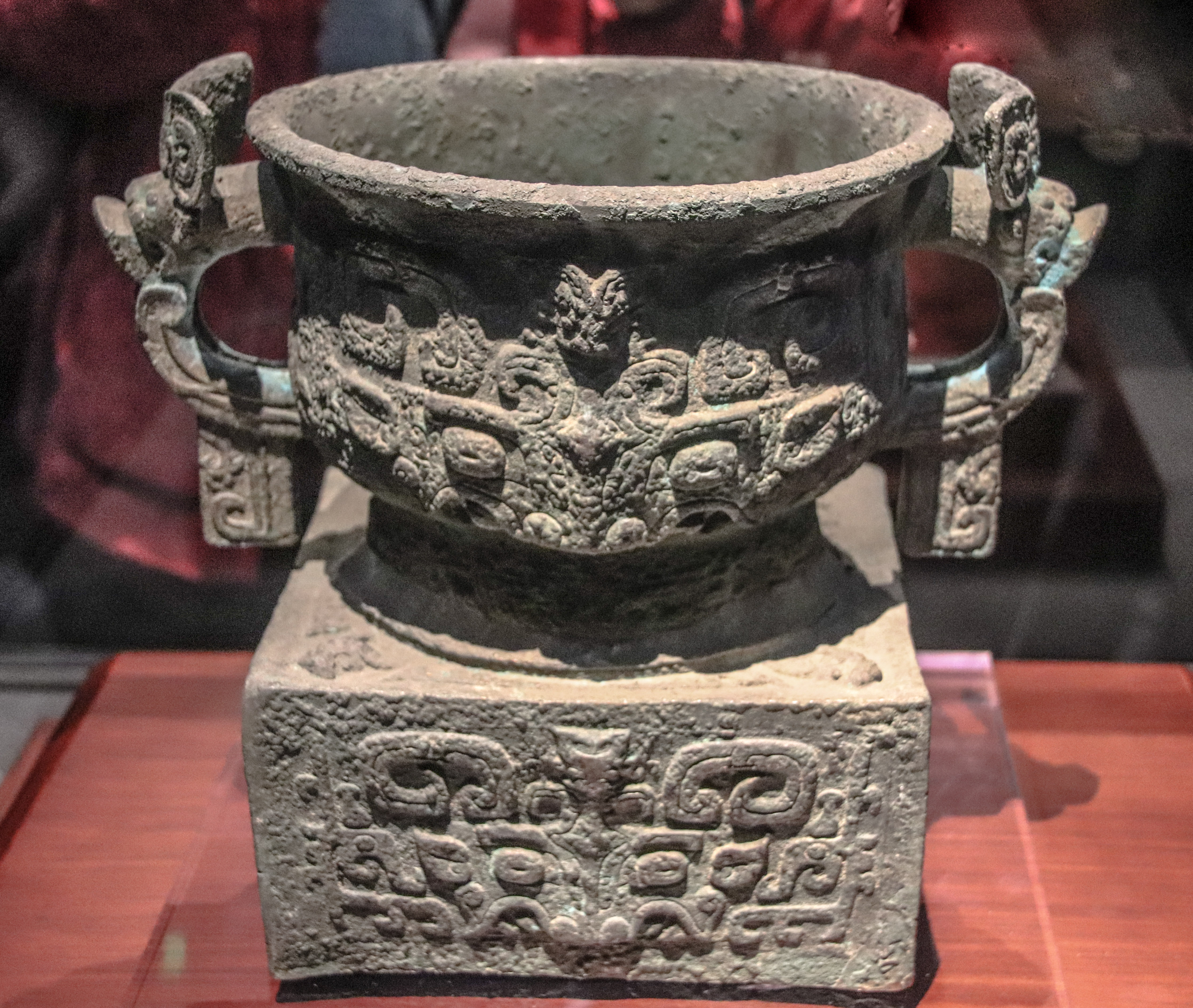
Li guǐ, early Western Zhou

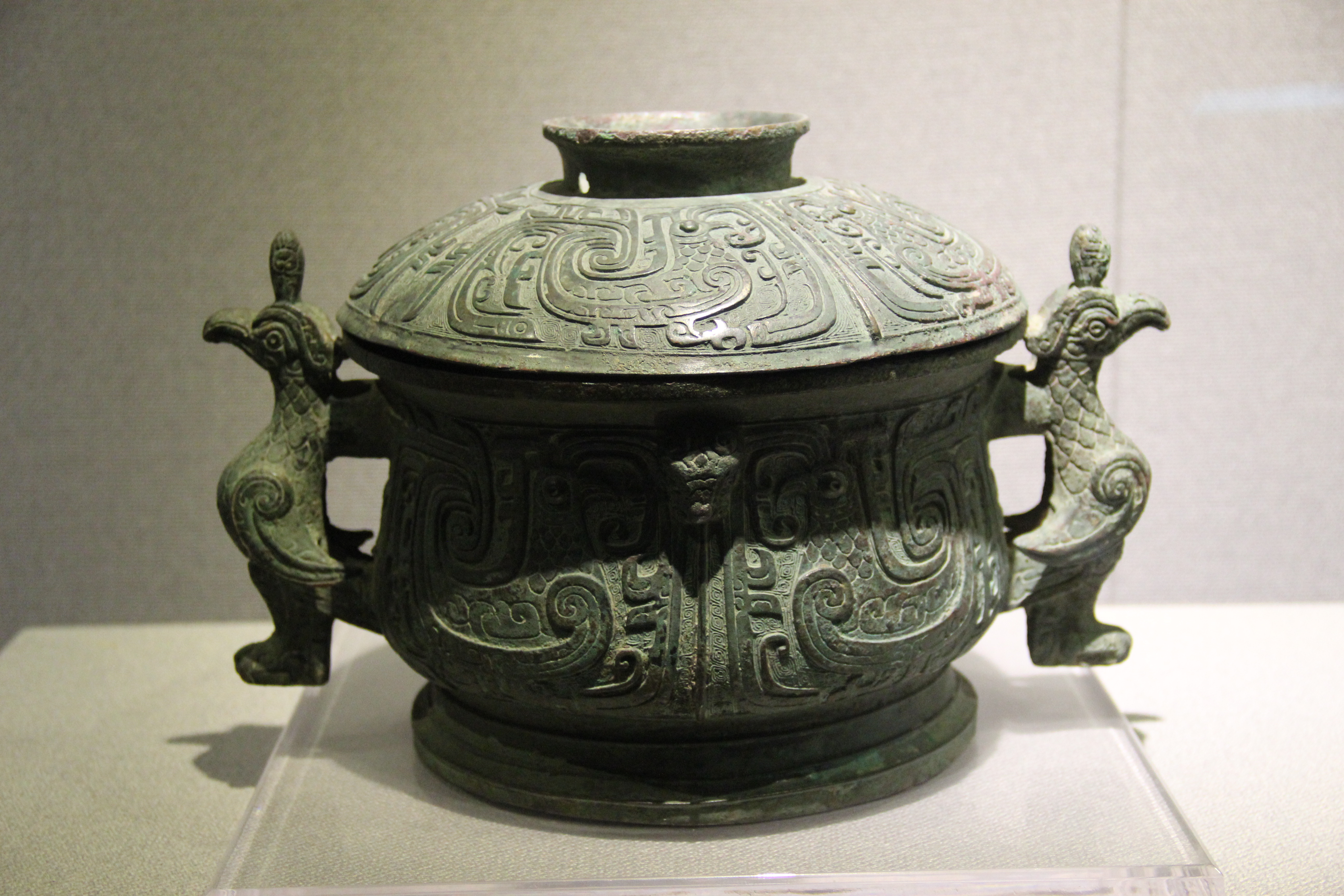
Dong guǐ, middle Western Zhou

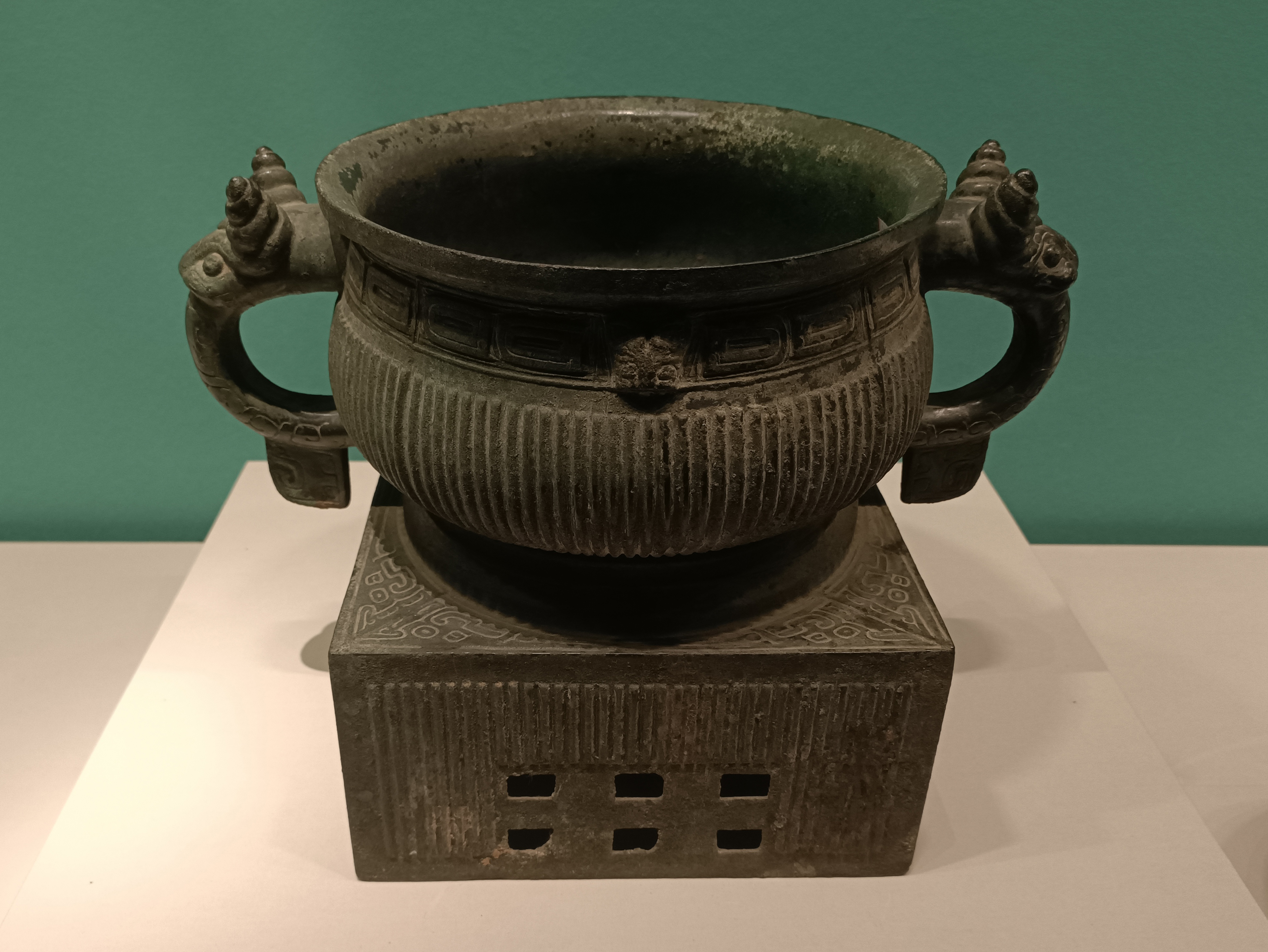
Xing guǐ, late Western Zhou
Western Zhou dǐng cauldrons

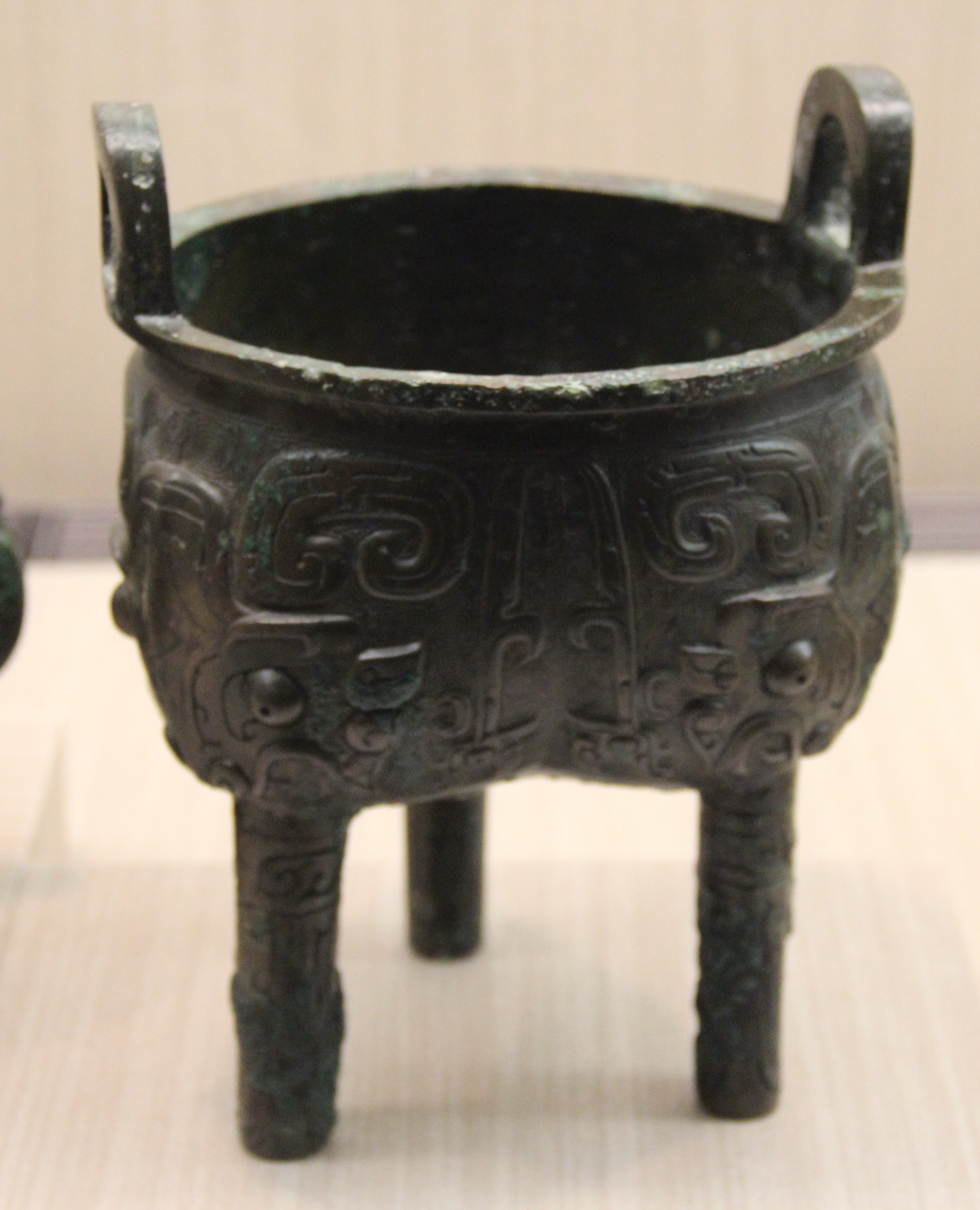
Xianhou dǐng, early Western Zhou

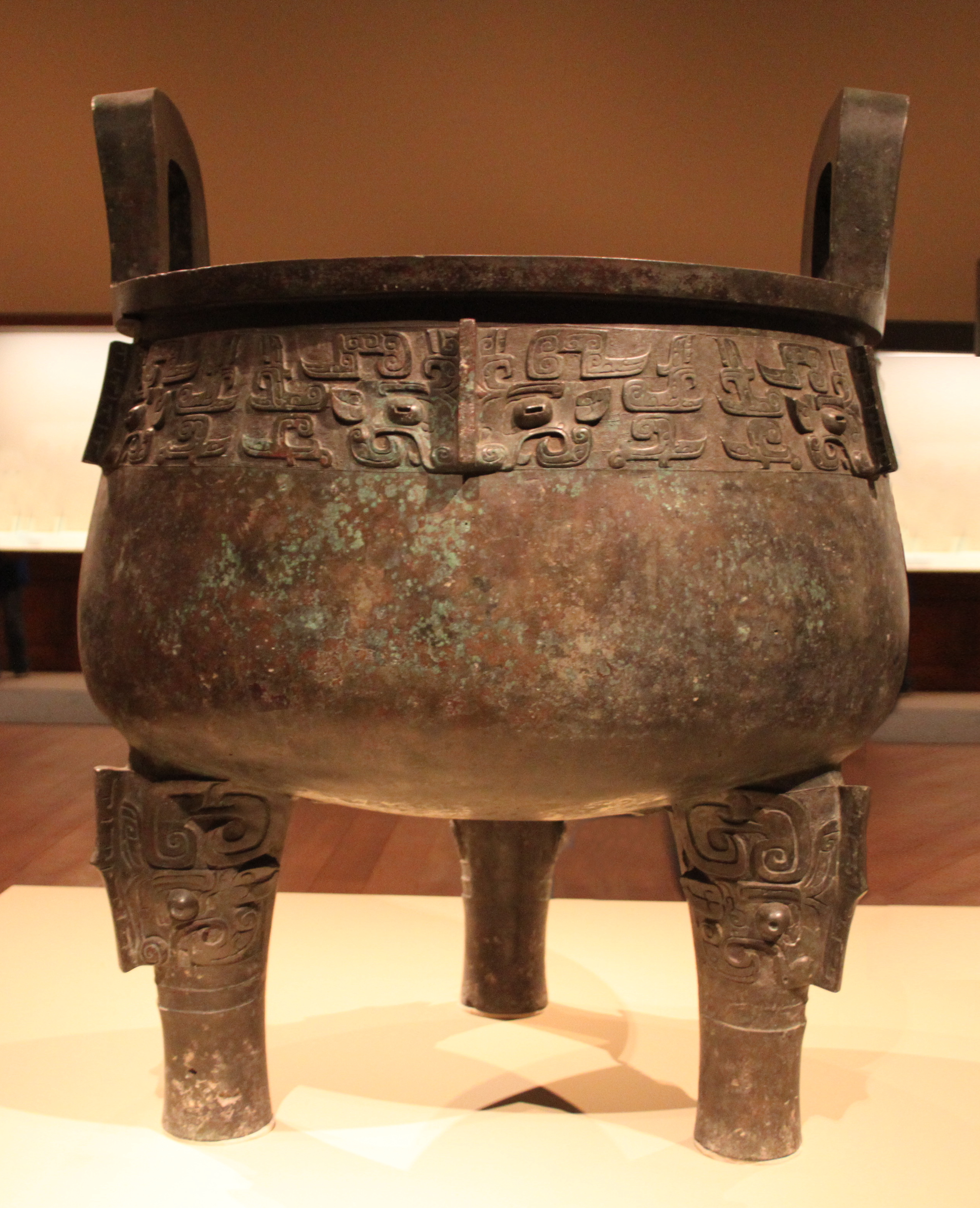
Da Yu dǐng, early Western Zhou

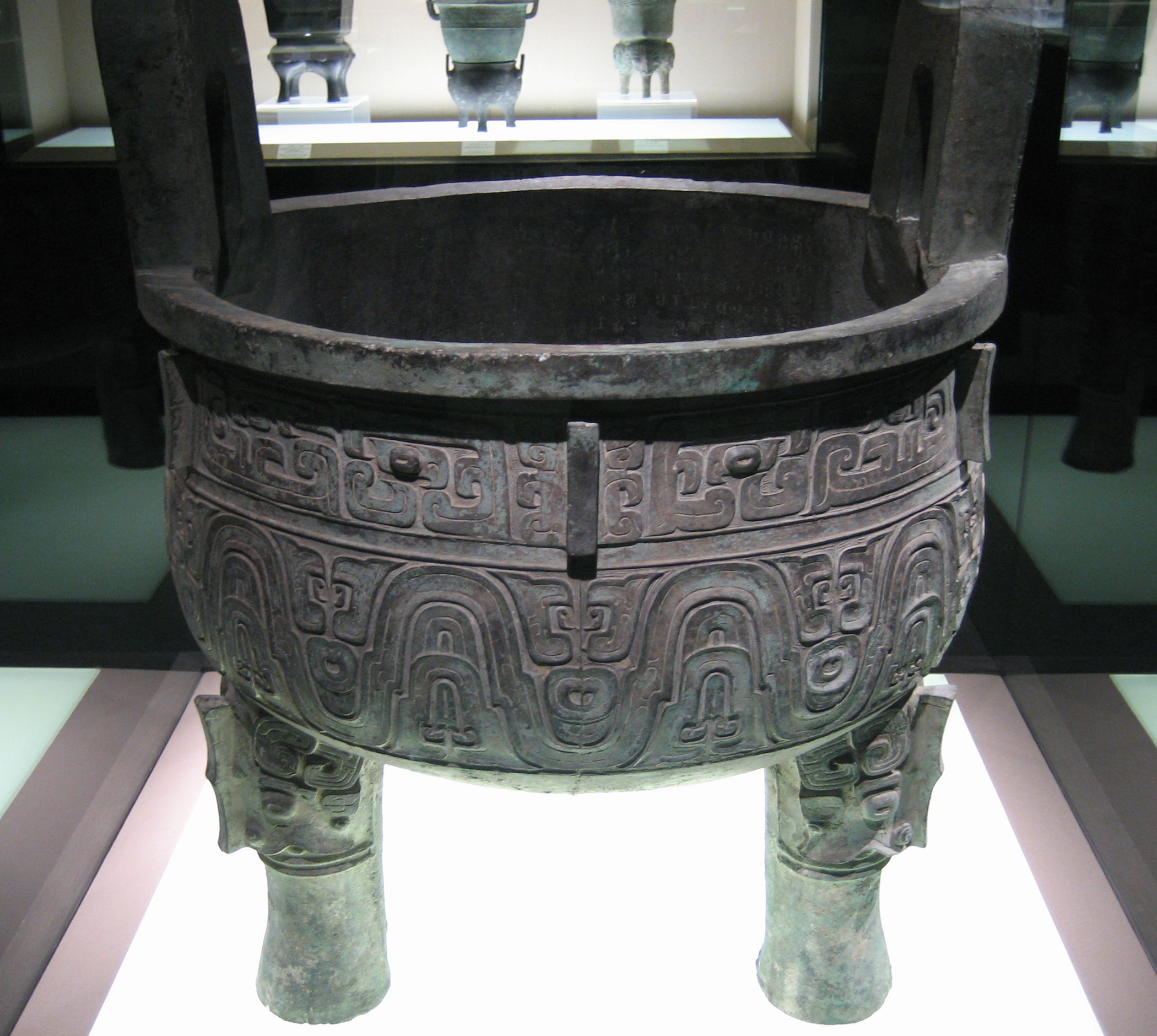
Da Ke dǐng, middle Western Zhou

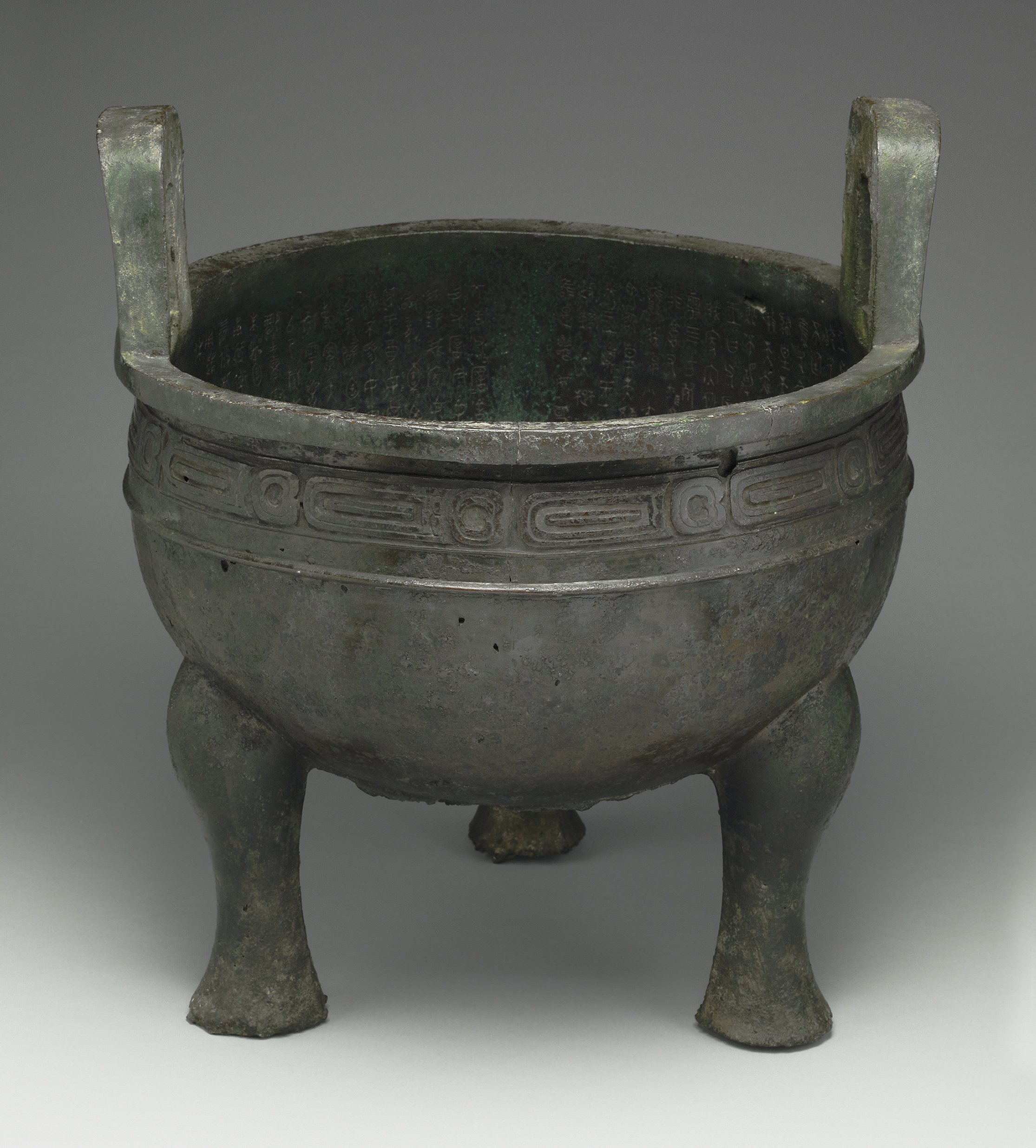
Mao Gong dǐng, late Western Zhou

=== Spring and Autumn period ===
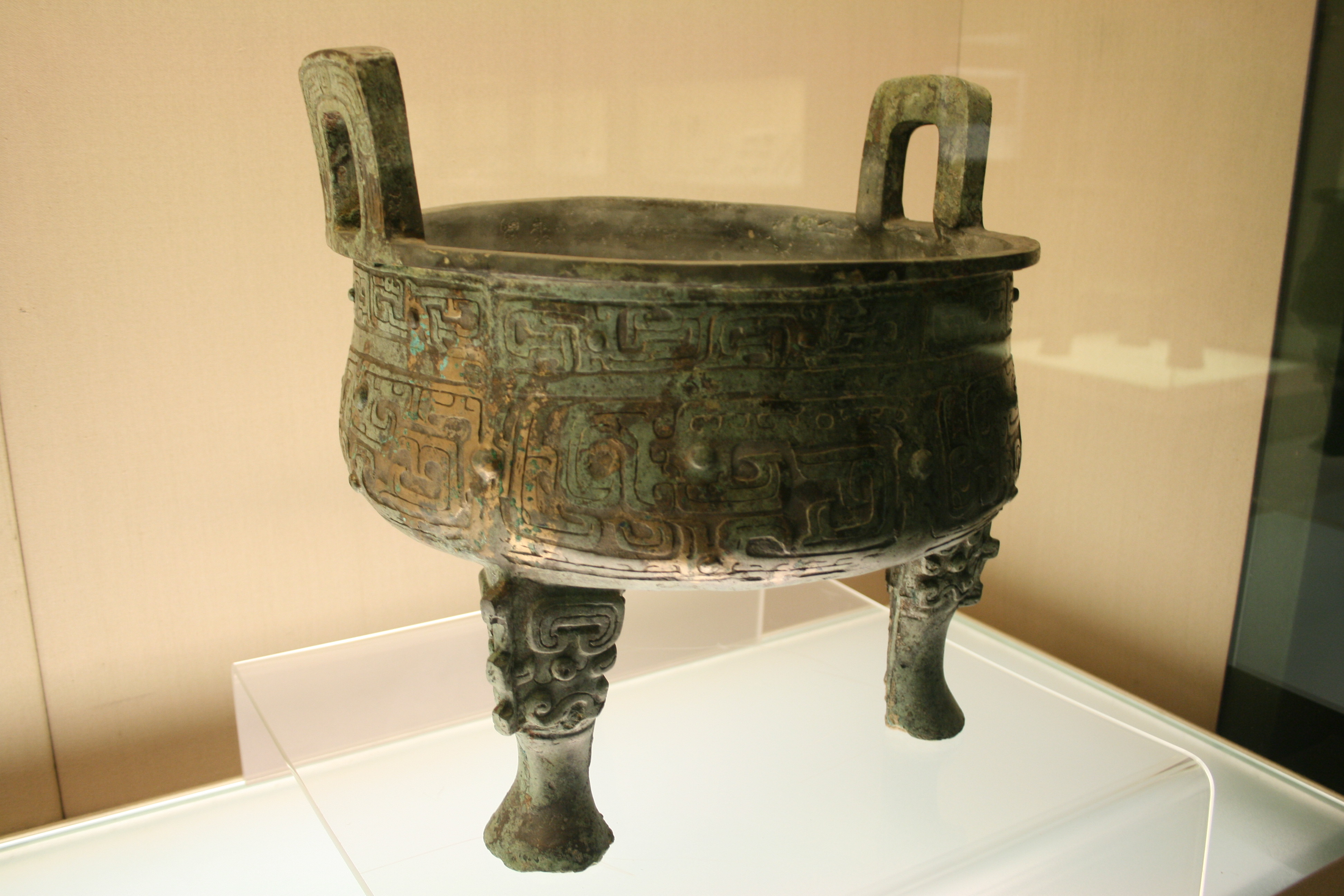
Dǐng, early Spring and Autumns period

For the first century of the Spring and Autumn period, designs largely followed those of the late Western Zhou. Over time, vessels became wider and shorter, and dragon decorations began to appear. Several innovations in the fabrication process were adopted around the middle of the period, contributing to revitalized designs with more intricate forms. The body and attachments of a vessel could be cast separately and welded together to complete the shape. Reusable pattern blocks made production faster and cheaper.

== See also ==
- Chinese bronze inscriptions
- History of Chinese archaeology
