= Yi (vessel) =

Type of ancient Chinese ritual bronzes

- yi in oracle bone script
- Chinese: 匜
Transcriptions
Standard Mandarin
- Hanyu Pinyin: yí
- Wade–Giles: i^{2}
Middle Chinese
- Middle Chinese: *laj

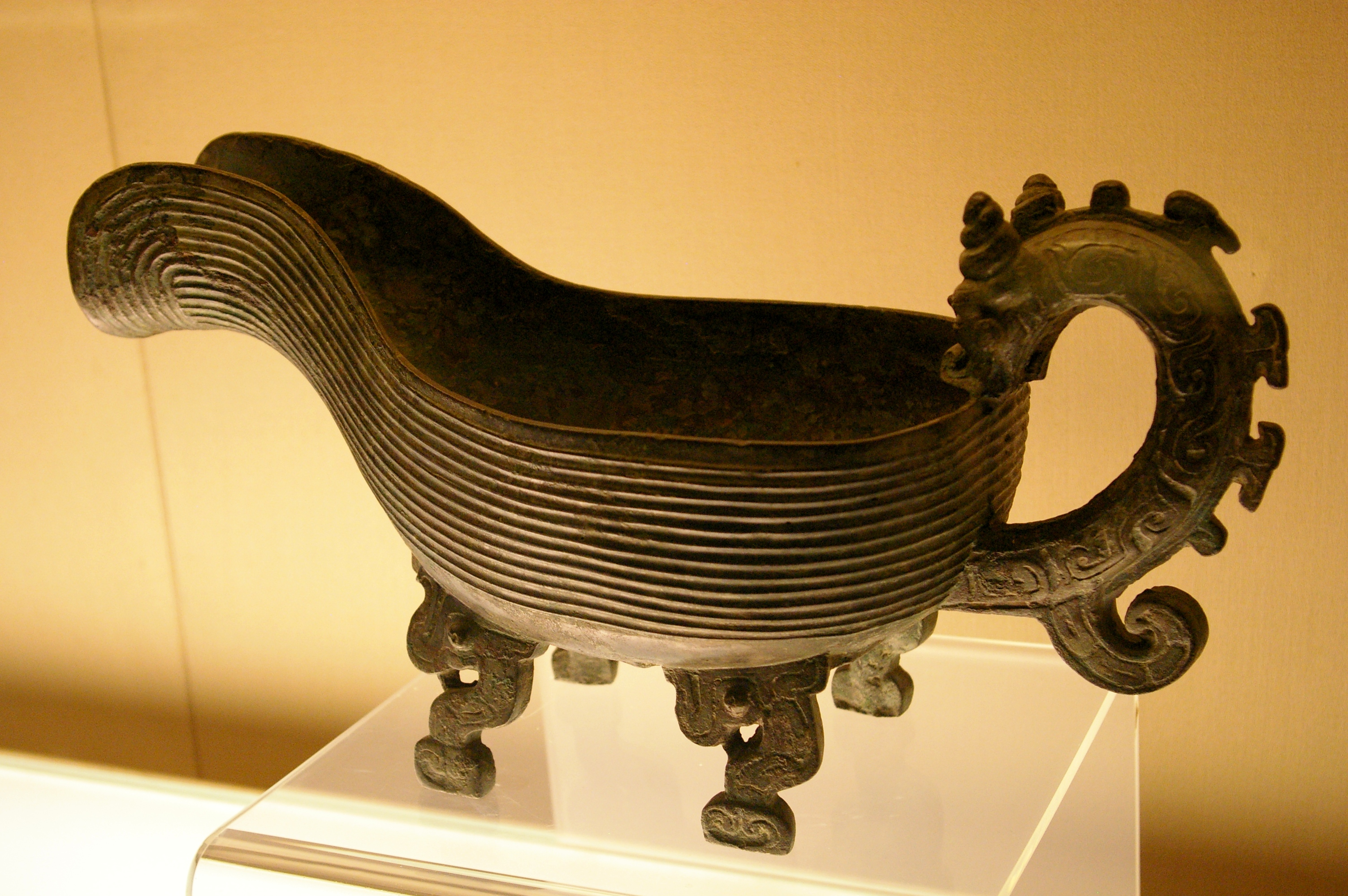
An yi in the collections of the Shanghai Museum.

A yi is a kind of ancient Chinese ritual bronzes in the shape of a half gourd with a handle (often in the shape of a dragon), usually supported by four legs. It is believed that it was used to contain water for washing hands before rituals like sacrifices.
