= Xiqing Gujian =

The Xiqing Gujian (simplified Chinese: 西清古鉴; traditional Chinese: 西清古鑑; pinyin: Xīqīng Gǔjiàn; Wade–Giles: Hsi ch'ing ku chien) is a 40-volume catalogue of Chinese ritual bronzes in the collection of the Qianlong Emperor of the Qing dynasty. It was compiled from 1749 to 1755 and documents 1529 bronze artefacts in the imperial collection.

Each entry contains a detailed woodcut illustration of the item catalogued, and a detailed description including the dimensions and weight of the artefact. Each volume is 29.5 cm by 22.6 cm, with 10 lines per page, and 18 characters per line. The frontispiece in marked with the date 乾隆十四年十一月初七日 (The seventh day, of the eleventh month, of the 14th year of the reign of the Qianlong Emperor) and the officials involved in the production of the catalogue.

A supplement, called the Xīqīng xùjiàn (西清續鑑), was published in 1793. The supplement added a further 1875 items to the catalogue and included another 900 items stored at the imperial palace in Shengjing (present-day Shenyang, Liaoning).

As the Qianlong Emperor was an assiduous collector of antique bronzes, a large proportion of the ancient Chinese bronzes then known were at one time or another part of the imperial collection. Being so comprehensive, the catalogue has therefore been extremely influential in the study of Chinese bronzes.
