= Desk pad =

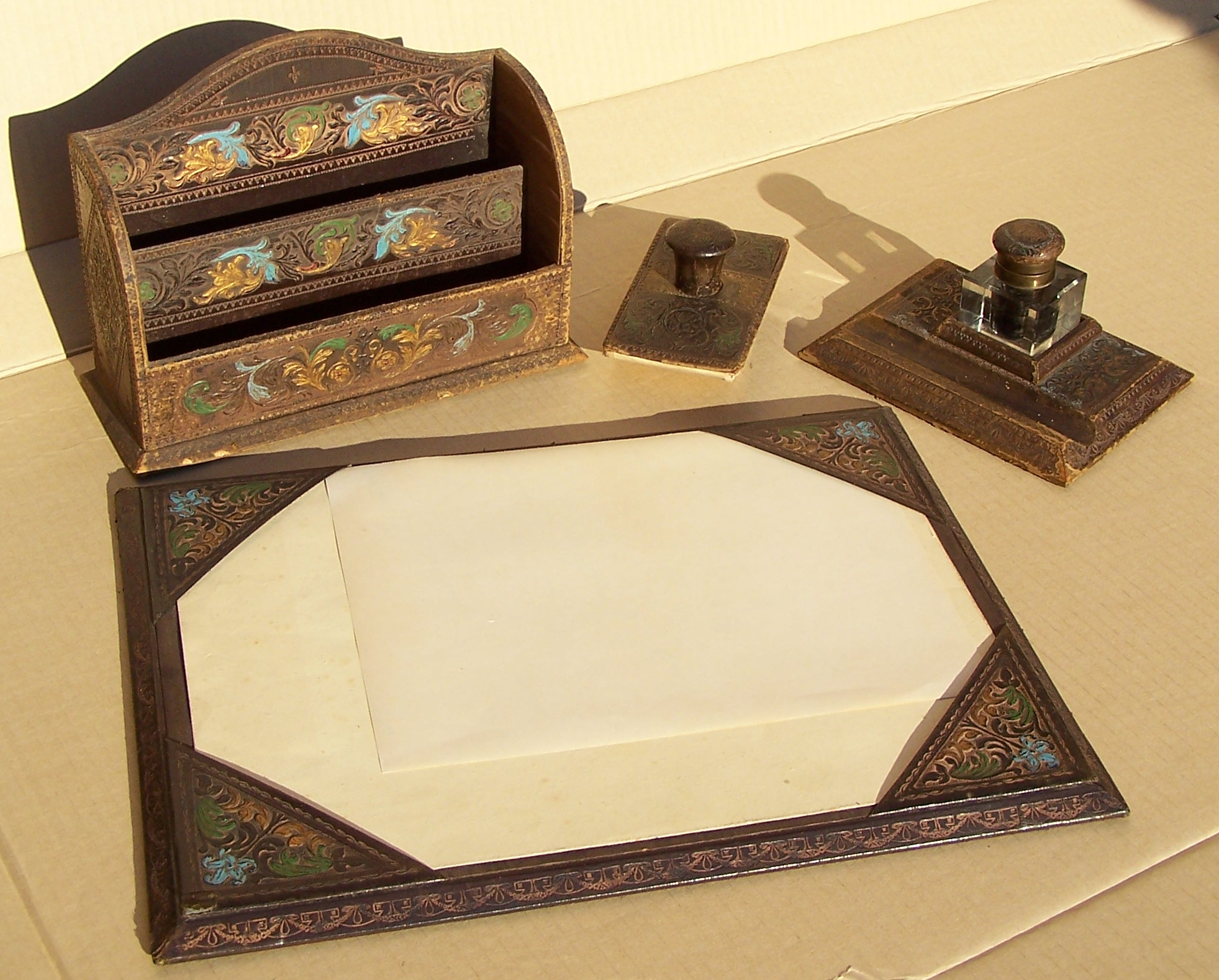

A desk pad, sometimes called a desk mat or a blotter, is a table protector used when work such as painting or writing would otherwise damage the table or desk.

== Description ==
Typical sizes for desk pads are A3 (420 × 297 mm, 11.7 × 16.5 in) and A2 (594 × 420 mm, 16.5 × 23.4 in). Desk pads are very popular promotional products, usually branded with a logo, contact information and product or service information.

Desk pads are typically glued at the foot (bottom) of the pad to prevent the paper from curling. Many are glued to a grey backboard. They can contain from 10 to 100 sheets, although 50 sheets is standard.

== Cultural variation ==
Different desk pads have specific uses; for example, Chinese calligraphy uses a black velour desk pad since Chinese calligraphy is written using an ink brush. Westerners use simpler writing pads with disposable paper surfaces that can be used for writing, note-taking, and scribbling. Often these pads are pre-printed with calendar pages; however, desk pads made of material (often leather) which serve to be written on and act as mouse pads are also common.

== See also ==
- Notebook
- Pencil board
