= Luboshez Guang =

Chinese ritual bronze wine vessel

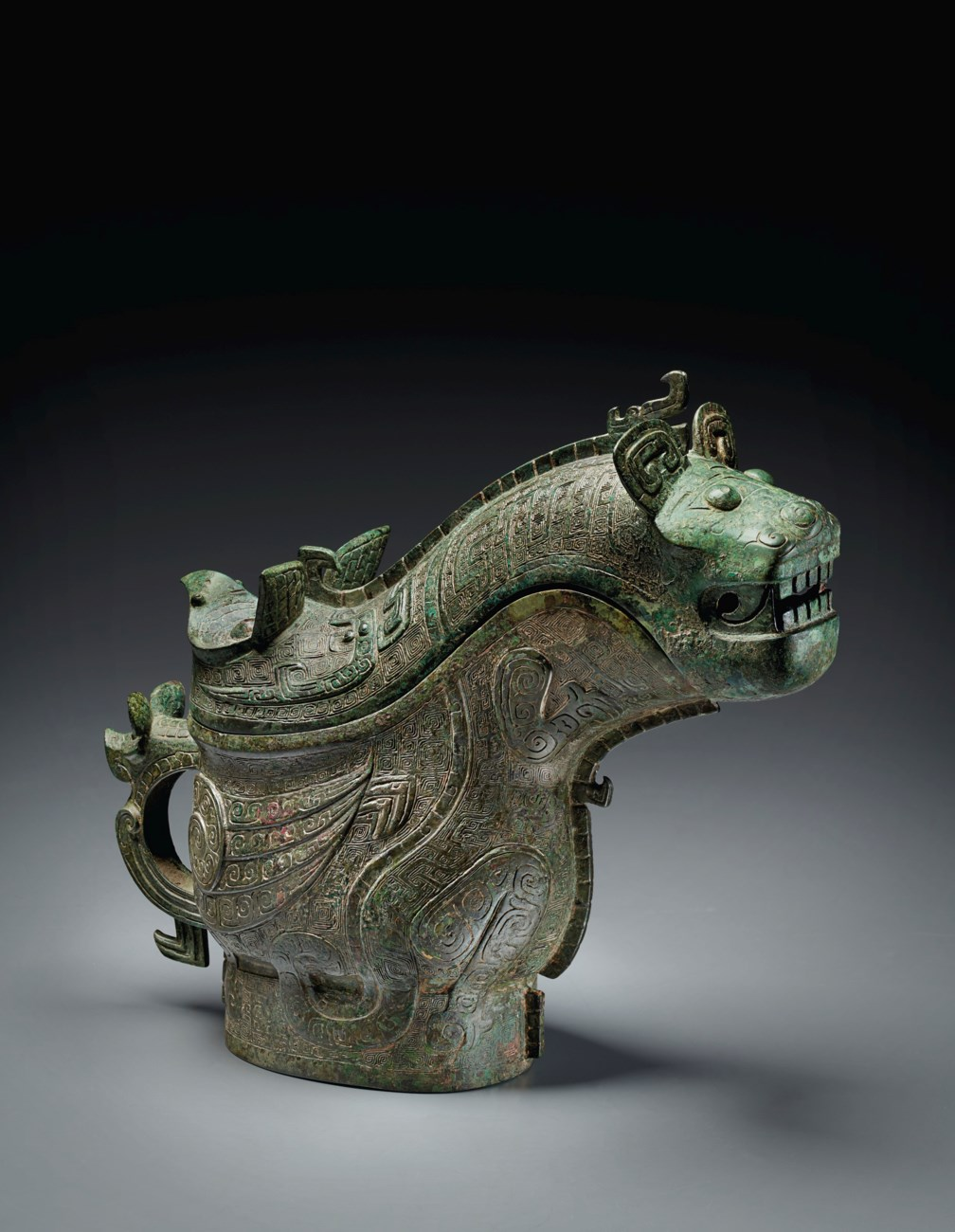
- Luboshez guang
- Material: Bronze
- Created: c. 1200 BC
- Discovered: before 1950; China

The Luboshez guang (Chinese: 觥; pinyin: gōng; Wade–Giles: kung^{1}) is a Chinese ritual bronze wine vessel, dated to the 13th-12th century BC during the Shang dynasty that was auctioned off by Christie's during the annual Asia Week NY auctions of 2021 for a total of $8.6 million.

== Description ==
The guang (or gong) is a ritual vessel with a removable lid, which was primarily used to serve wine in ancestral rituals. The ritual motifs of guang are typically of that of animal masks, or a taotie. In the case of the Luboshez guang, the taotie motifs are that of a tiger of the anterior of the vessel, and an owl on the posterior, with the tail of the animal linking up with the back of the tiger on the pitcher.

There are six known similar types, one of which is held at the Harvard Art Museum (as 1942.52.103), two Japanese specimens in addition to a contemporary piece found in the Tomb of Fu Hao in Yinxu, Anyang in 1976. The vessel has been dated and is likely traced to the same workshop given the inscription found on the Fu Hao vessel, and the known date of her husband, Shang Dynasty ruler Wu Ding (c. 1250-1192 BC).

== History and provenance ==
The guang was first documented in the collection of S.N. Ferris Luboshez (1896-1984), a captain of the U.S. Navy, who served as Foreign Liquidation Commission for the Department of State from 1945 to 1949 in Shanghai, acquiring over a hundred bronze and ceramics from the Shang to the Ming dynasty. The bronze was acquired in the leading days to the Proclamation of the People's Republic of China, and as such with a 1949 ban on the sale of art to foreigners under the Chinese Communist Party, the piece was among the last to be removed from China.

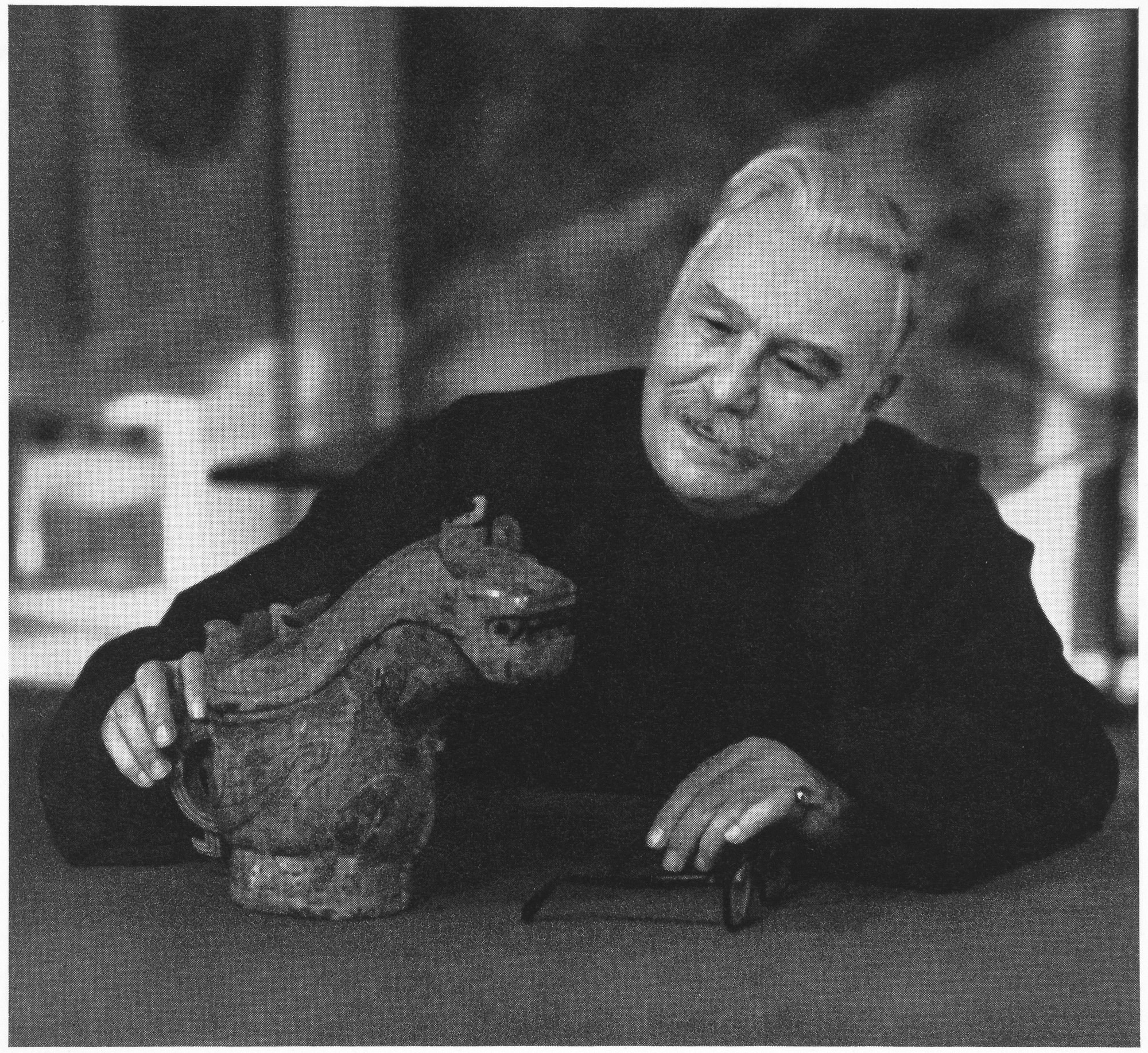
Luboshez with the guang (Sergius N. Ferris Luboshez Collection, Freer & Sackler Gallery Archives)

Luboshez held on to the guang at his residence in Maryland until 1982, when it was sold for $154,000 in a Sotheby's auction to a dealer in London.

The guang was held by a private collection in Switzerland from 1982 to 1986, followed by ownership by the J.J. Lally & Co gallery in New York City, and the collection of Daniel Shapiro, where it was then auctioned by him thru Christies with an estimate of $4-6 million, selling for $8.604M.

== See also ==
- Ritual wine server (guang), Indianapolis
