= Guang (vessel) =

- Chinese: 觥
Transcriptions
Standard Mandarin
- Hanyu Pinyin: gōng
- Wade–Giles: kung^{1}
Middle Chinese
- Middle Chinese: kˠwæŋ
Old Chinese
- Zhengzhang: *kʷraːŋ

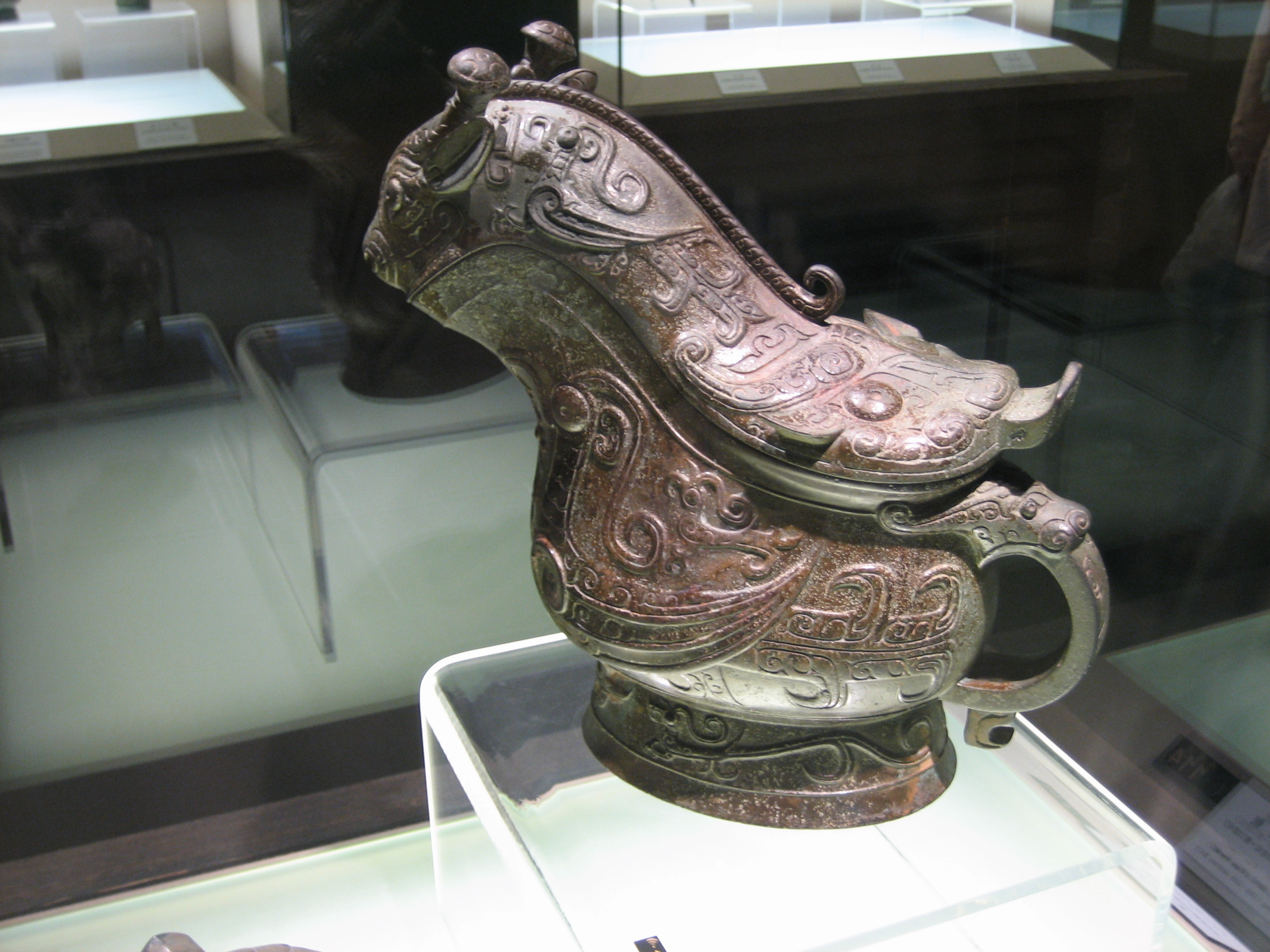
Late Shang dynasty guang, Shanghai Museum

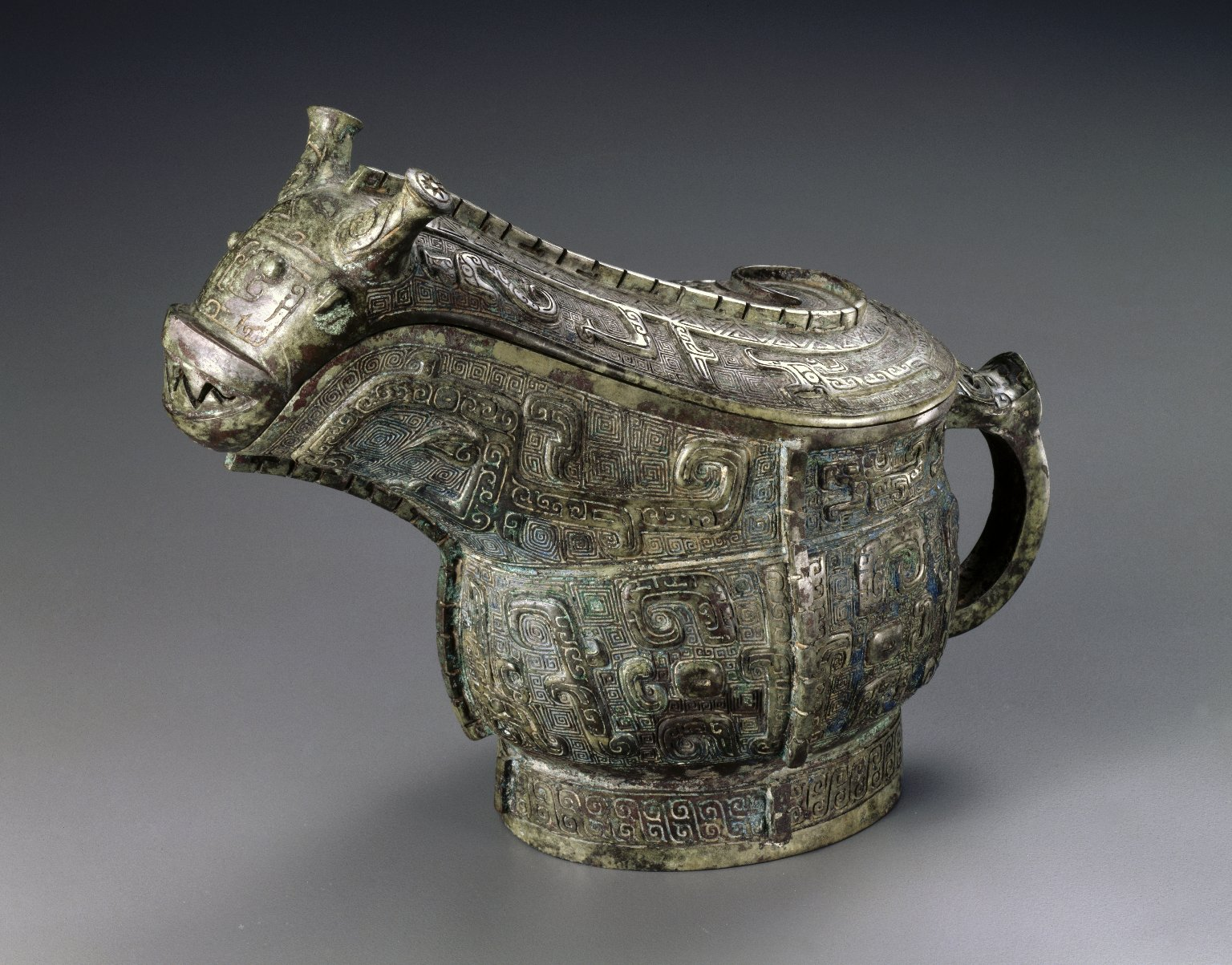
Ritual Wine Vessel (guang), circa 1700–1050 BCE, bronze, 16x8.2x21.5 cm (6 1/2x3 1/4x8 1/2 in), in Brooklyn Museum

A guang or gong is a particular shape used in Chinese art for vessels, originally made as Chinese ritual bronzes in the Shang dynasty (c. 1600 – c. 1046 BCE), and sometimes later in Chinese porcelain. They are a type of pitcher which was used for pouring rice wine at ritual banquets, and often deposited as grave goods in high-status burial. Examples of the shape may be described as ewers, ritual wine vessels, wine pourers and similar terms, though all of these terms are also used of a number of other shapes, especially the smaller tripod jue and the larger zun.

The guang has a single thick foot, and a thick hollow body that represents one or more stylized animals (some have a head at both ends). Guangs have a vertical handle at one end and a spout at the other, both zoomorphic, and were often highly decorated with taotie. The handle of the guang is of often in the shape of the neck and head of an animal with stylized horns, and the spout of the vessel is in the form of the head of a creature whose mouth constitutes the end of the spout. The back and animal head at the pouring end usually are a removable lid, lifted off for pouring.

Their main period of use was during the Shang and Zhou dynasties, from around 1700 to 900 BCE; thereafter the shape was sometimes used in a revivalist spirit. The Ritual wine server (guang), Indianapolis Museum of Art, 60.43 is a fine example from about 1100 BCE.

== Function and use ==
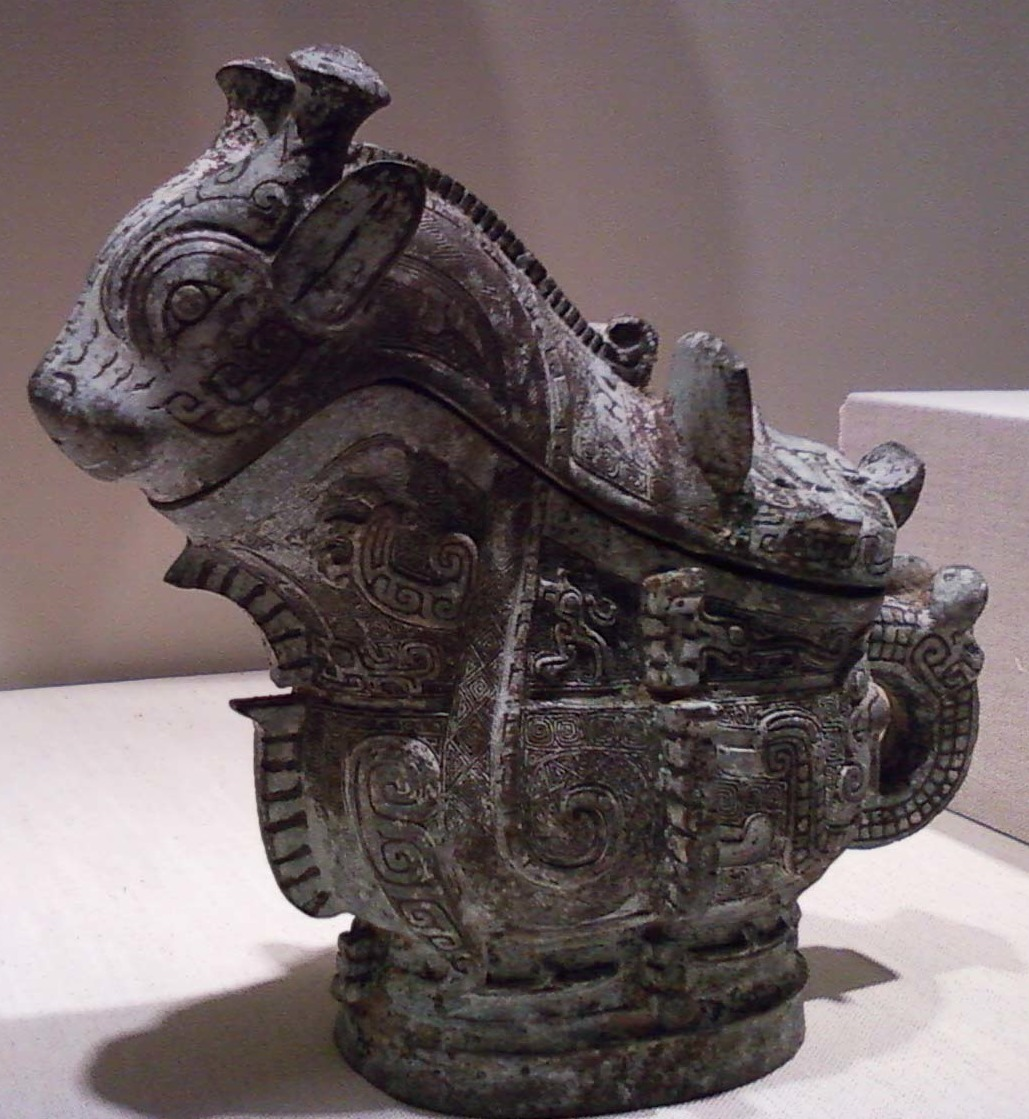
Shang dynasty ritual wine server (guang), Indianapolis Museum of Art

The guang bronze ritual vessels of Early China were primarily used to house and serve wine during ancestor worship rituals in which the wine vapors were to be consumed by the deceased spirits and the actual physical contents to be enjoyed by the living. This use, for storage and serving, is suggested through the form of the vessel. It is typically supported by one oval-shaped foot (supported more rarely by four legs), while the bronze itself takes the form of several animals and fantastical creatures metamorphosed. Each guang also has a neck and head, which serve as the pouring channel for the wine. A lid accompanies the vessel to complete the form. According to Robert Bagley, this lid is the chief idiosyncrasy, or characteristic, of the guang, for it is where the largest relief and decoration often takes place. While this decor is significant in the meaning behind these works, the animal and fantastic creature ornamentation does not have an exact intended purpose for the bronzes, and is still left to interpretation.

Guang bronze vessels were used not only in life to honor the deceased, but also at times placed with the deceased in their grave. Because of this, the ritual vessels are not only apotropaic but useful to the living as well. They are both everyday functioning items, but also objects which serve religious and spiritual purposes.

== Décor ==
The Guang is distinguishable by its zoomorphic lid and handle, and its one-footed base. The animal figure at the front of the lid is often a tiger or dragon, while the sculpted handle ranges in decoration from fantastic creatures such as dragons to real animals such as rams, elephants, and the beaks of birds. Some guang lids also depict animals, typically birds, at the back of the vessel facing or transitioning into the handle. The animals on the lid and handle are presented "in the round".

The surface of the vessel is decorated in low- to mid-relief. This relief may depict the bodies belonging to creatures rendered on the lid or other complete animal figures. It is not uncommon for one animal to transition directly into another. The lower sections of the guang are also often divided into registers and quadrants by flanges. This flange can be the central divider of a taotie, a mask-like creature motif with curving horns and two dragon-like bodies stretching out to its sides. Other surface embellishments include geometric background shapes such as the squared-spiral, the lei-wen. These were used both to fill in empty space between more representational imagery and sometimes as smaller detail in those images.

== Historical development ==
=== Shang dynasty (c. 1600–1046 BCE) ===
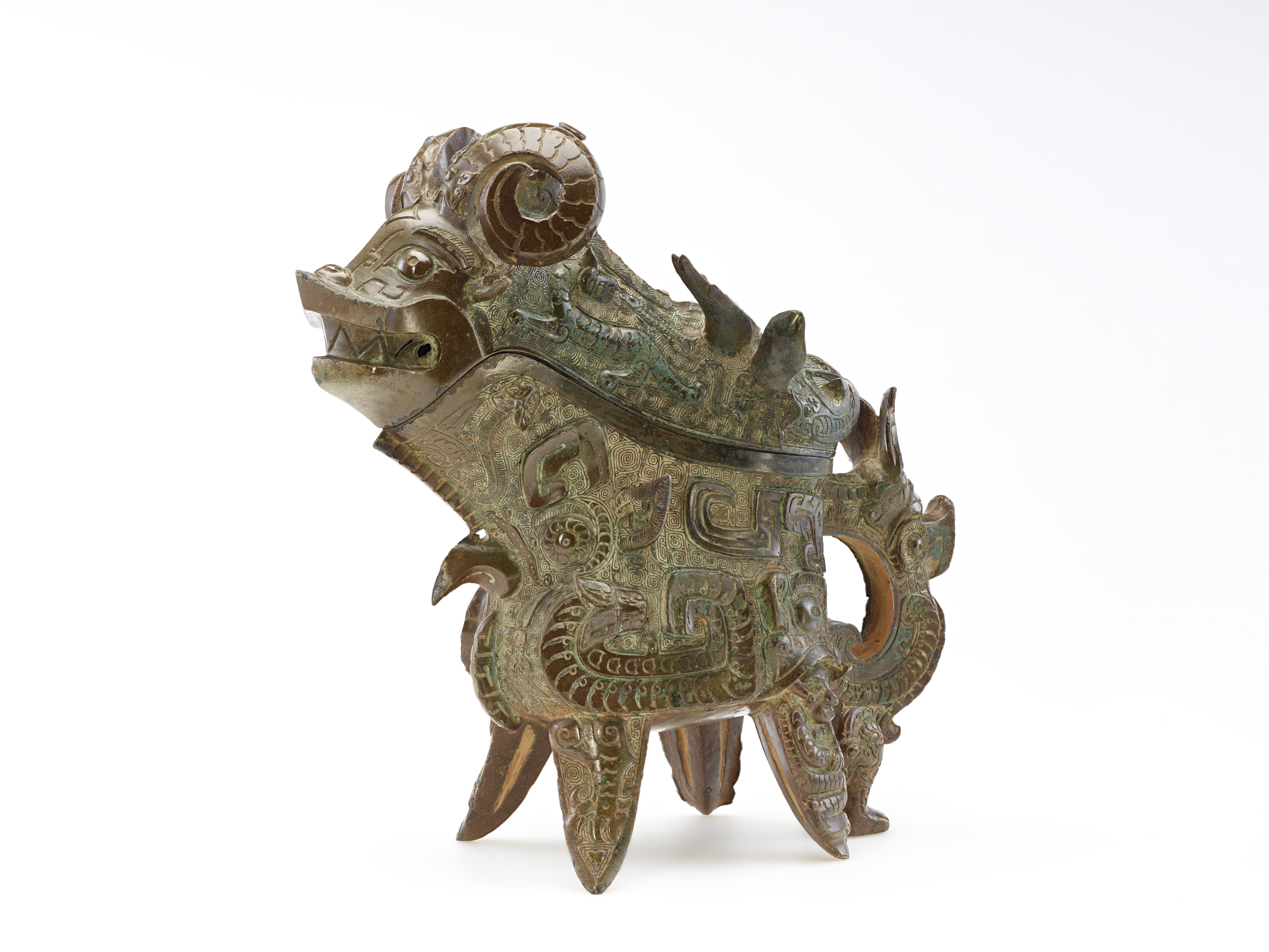
Ritual wine ewer (guang) with taotie, dragons, and real animals. Late Shang dynasty, 11th century BCE. Freer Gallery of Art

The guang, one of many types of Chinese ritual bronze vessels, is both late to come into the world of bronze vessels, and lasts a very short amount of time. The earliest account of guang vessels comes from late in the Shang dynasty, during the Anyang Period, spanning from c. 1300–1046 BCE. These vessels were distinct from other guang objects in early Chinese history because of their decoration. During the Shang dynasty, the guang featured ornamentation which had not been fully developed. In a late twelfth century to early eleventh century guang, the decoration is lacking on the bottom register, but more innovative in design in the lid and upper registers. In the Qi Guang vessel from approximately the same time period, the decoration has been compartmentalized and unified in style, which utilizes conventional motifs of bird, dragon, and other animal imagery.

=== Western Zhou dynasty (c. 1045–771 BCE) ===
The Western Zhou dynasty is the final period in which guang vessels are known to have been made, due widely to the Ritual Revolution which occurred in the late Western Zhou dynasty, ultimately reducing the number of wine vessels being made. Before this disappearance, the guang saw changes in form, such as the ovular foot being sometimes replaced with four legs. The decoration also becomes more refined, yet still using animal and fantastic imagery.

== Casting ==
Early Chinese bronze vessels were cast using the piece-mold process. This process involved the artist forming the mold in pieces from clay, then connecting them to make one overall vessel form. With this method, the decoration on a vessel's surface had to be incised into the clay in reverse and negative. This means that images that would be raised on the surface of the metal would have to become depressions in the clay mold. The void inside the mold is then filled with molten metal, creating the positive. In contrast, the process of lost-wax casting allows an artisan to create a wax model of the desired object. The molten metal takes the place of the wax when cast. Frequently it was necessary in the casting of large vessels to cast the main portion, include it in the construction of another mold, and then cast protrusions—such as the guang's handle—onto that piece.

== Inscriptions ==
From late Shang to early Zhou dynasty, the number of characters per inscription increased on these bronze vessels. These inscriptions recorded very important events (such as sacrifices), gifts by a king to his officials, praise accorded to ancestors, records for exchange/sale land, and political marriages to make stronger relationships.

== Historical and cultural references ==
After the "Ritual Revolution", some of the wine vessels were no longer in use in Western Zhou dynasty. The Guang vessel were only popular in late Shang to early Western Zhou dynasty.

== See also ==
- Luboshez Guang

== Sources ==
- Allen, Anthony J."Allen's Authentication of Ancient Chinese Bronzes".Walter Hirsh and Associates. December 31, 2001
- Asian Art Museum. Bronze Vessels of Ancient China in the Avery Brundage Collection. San Francisco:

Asian Art Museum, 1977.

- Bagley, Robert (1987). Shang Ritual Bronzes in the Arthur M. Sackler Collections. Washington, D.C.: Arthur M. Sackler Foundation. ISBN 0-674-80525-9.
- D'Argence, Rene-Yvon (1977). Bronze Vessels of Ancient China in the Avery Brundage Collection. Japan: Dai Nippon Printing Co., Ltd.
- The Great Bronze Age of China. New York: Metropolitan Museum of Art, 1980.
- Delbanco, Dawn Ho (1983). Art from Ritual. Ancient Chinese Bronze Vessels from the Arthur M. Sackler Collections. Washington, D.C.: The Arthur M. Sackler Foundation. ISBN 0-916724-54-9.
- Fong, Wen (1980). Great Bronze Age of China. New York: Alfred A. Knopf, Inc.. ISBN 0-87099-226-0
- Ping-hen, Liou. "Bronzes of the Shang and Zhou Dynasties". National Museum of History Republic of China, May 1, 1989
- Rawson, Jessica (1987). Chinese Bronzes: Art and Ritual. British Museums Publication Ltd.
- Sing, Yu; Caron Smith (1999). Ringing Thunder- Tomb Treasures from Ancient China. San Diego: San Diego Museum of Art. ISBN 0-937108-24-3.
