= Ritual wine server (guang), Indianapolis =

Chinese ritual bronze wine vessel

Ritual wine server (guang)
- 觥 (Chinese)
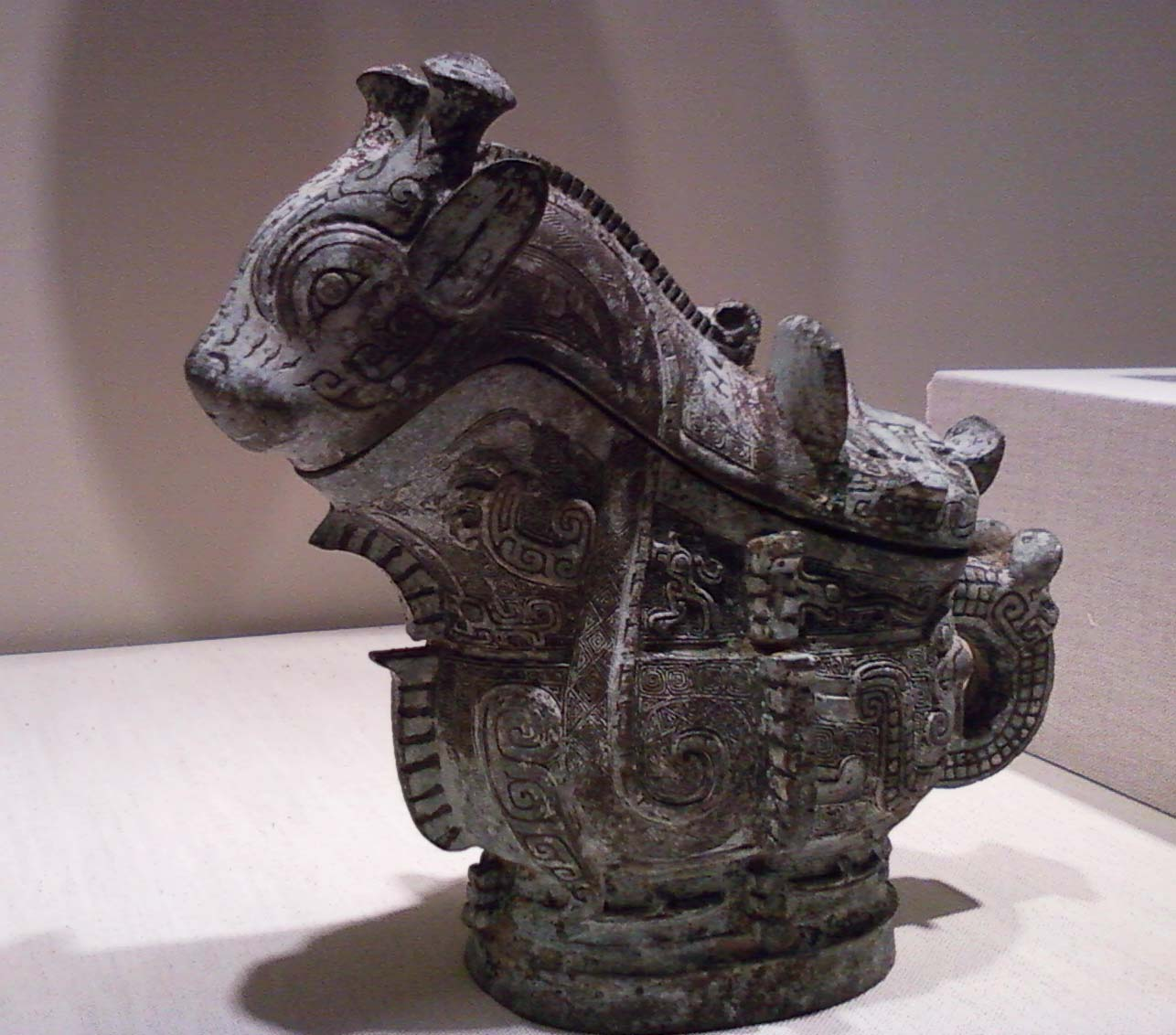
- Artist: Unknown Chinese artist
- Year: 1100 BCE
- Type: Bronze
- Dimensions: 8.25 in × 9 in (21 cm × 22.9 cm)
- Location: Indianapolis Museum of Art; Indianapolis, IN

An elaborately decorated "ritual wine server" in the guang shape (Chinese: 觥; pinyin: gōng; Wade–Giles: kung^{1}) is a Chinese ritual bronze wine vessel, accession number 60.43, in the permanent Asian collection at the Indianapolis Museum of Art. It dates to about 1100 BCE in the Shang dynasty period. The piece is currently on display in the Arthur R. & Frances D. Baxter Gallery of the museum.

== Description ==
This ritual wine server, referred to in Chinese as a guang, is a bronze, piece-mold cast vessel complete with removable lid. Adorning the surface of the vessel are three primary decorative animal motifs, including fifteen imaginary creatures cast in relief along the sides. The first animal depicted is apparent in the overall shape and design of the removable lid. Here a battle-horned beast dominates the wide spout, with its large head merging seamlessly with reverse-S-shaped bodies descending to the base of the vessel. Under the spout, the beast's forepaws appear posed in a position indicating the animal is rearing up on its hind legs. The second animal motif is that of a taotie, a mask designed to look like a monstrous animal. The taotie cast into this vessel sits at the end of the lid, depicted with zoomorphic horns and a sharp, upward curved base. The final animal motif consists of a scaled, serpent-like dragon along the rear register of the vessel. This dragon is curved to look back upon its own tail and the front of the guang. In addition to these three creatures, small birds and dragons have been cast in low relief along the vessel's upper register and the handle is designed to resemble the scaled body of an unidentified creature with an animal face molded into the upper curve.

Cast into the underside of the lid is a Chinese character, likely a signature from the vessel's original owner depicting the owner's tribe sign. This particular clan sign has also been noted within several other bronze artifacts dated from this period. For example, a "lei" vessel in the Shanghai Museum collection (H. 46.5 cm), recorded in Zhongguo qingtongqi quanji 3.83 (see also Jinchu yinzhou jinwen jilu erbian, Vol.3, p. 197). In the Museum für Ostasiatische Kunst Köln is a "fangyi" vessel (H. 26.5 cm) that also carries the same emblem (Bagley 1987:137). A third example is the Metropolitan Museum of Art "zun" vessel (H. 39.7 cm), accession number 43.25.1. This has led some scholars to believe that this wine vessel may have been only one of several pieces designed by a single workshop for one influential customer.

== Historical information ==
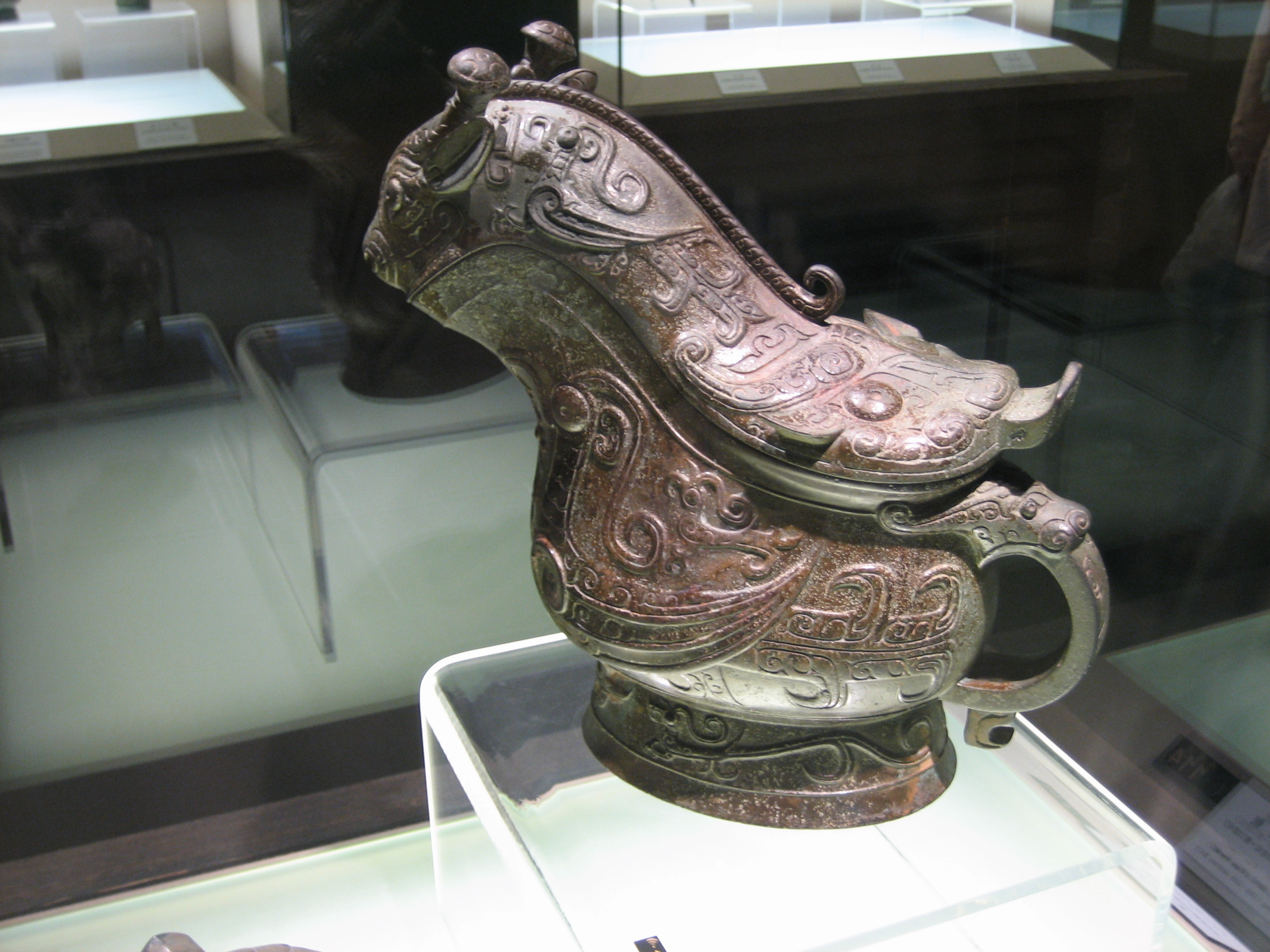
A comparable late Shang dynasty guang, Shanghai Museum

Cast during the Shang dynasty (c. 1600–1050 BCE), this wine vessel is representative of the highly evolved piece-mold technologies developed within China's Bronze Age. Due to the large number of surviving bronze vessels from this era, scholars have deduced that this age in China's history must have been a highly developed state with strong control over resources such as copper, tin, and lead, needed to create the alloy bronze. Additionally, the Chinese technique of using piece-mold casting was considered extremely sophisticated compared to the lost-wax method used by other world cultures during their own Bronze Ages. During piece-mold casting, the object to be created is first designed as a model, and then enclosed in a clay mold that can be cut into pieces to remove it from the model. These clay pieces are then decorated or stamped with intricate designs before being fired back together, creating a mold for the bronze casting. For vessels such as this one, the central cavity of the container would have been created by placing a core inside the mold before casting with molten bronze. By casting the objects into molds already decorated with designs, craftsmen were able to use this technique to attain a higher level of definition than in any previously utilized casting methods. Furthermore, unlike many other early bronze wine vessels, guang have no history of prior ceramic prototypes, marking them as unique casts specifically from the Shang and Zhou dynasties.

Wine vessels such as this one were likely the property of a single owner and according to Chinese traditions of the time, the vessels would have been buried with that owner upon their death. This has resulted in most early Chinese bronze examples having been discovered in tombs throughout the nation. This particular vessel would have only been used for the serving of wine during rituals, particularly ones honoring the owner's ancestors. This is proven by the intricate designs of mythical creatures along the vessel's surface as these images were believed to represent mystical powers beyond the physical world. Stylistic similarities with other vessels excavated in the Henan province, suggest that this guang probably belonged to an individual from Anyang, the last capital of the Shang.

== Acquisition ==
This wine server is listed as being a gift from Mr. and Mrs. Eli Lilly to the Indianapolis Museum of Art. Provenance information for the vessel explains that a letter dated May 15, 1950 to W. Peat from Fritz Low-Beer states Eli Lilly purchased the guang in February 1949 for $8,500.
