= Pencil board =

Material placed under a sheet of paper for writing

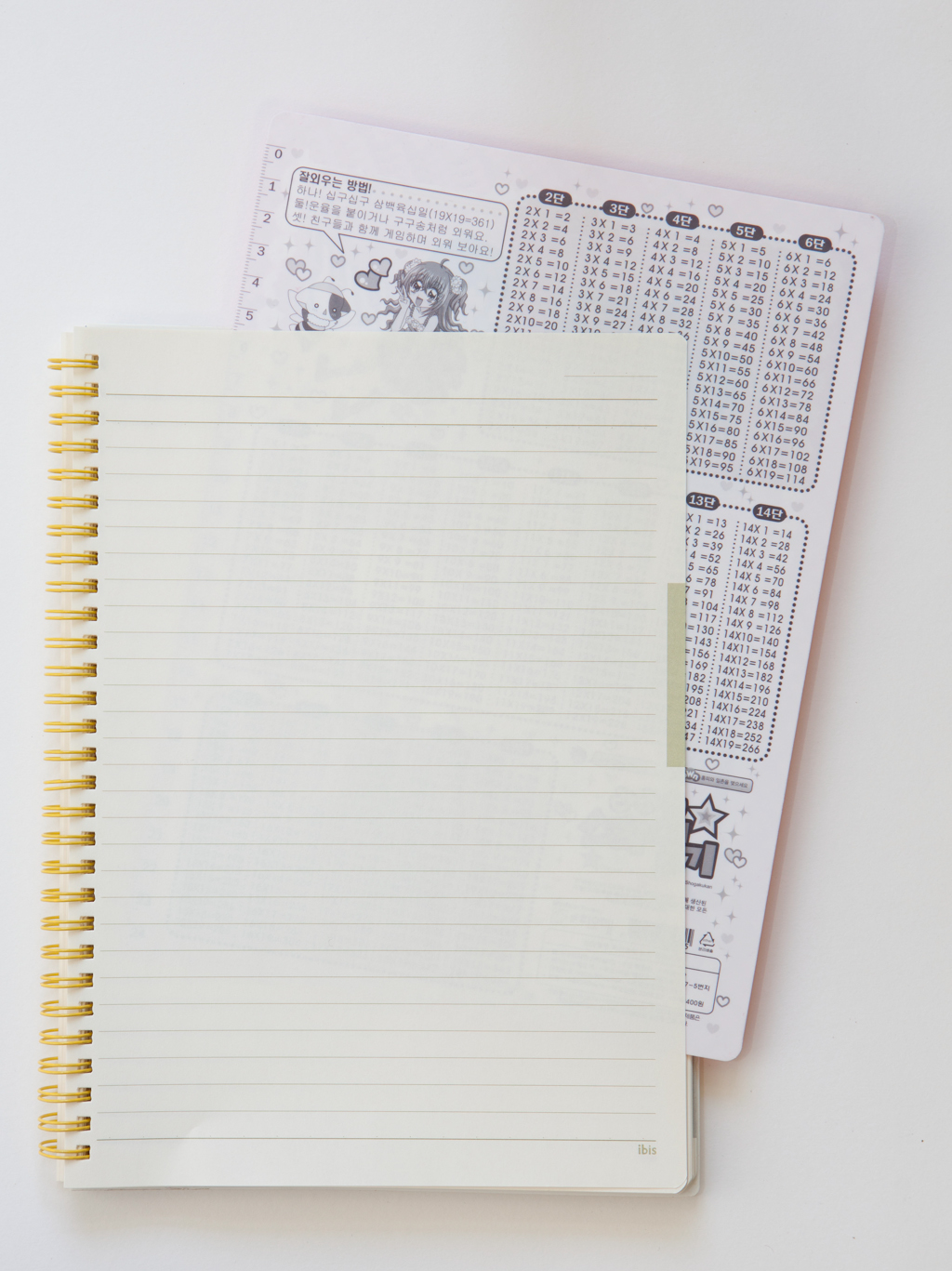

Shitajiki (下敷き, lit. "Underlay") is a Japanese word for various types of materials placed under a sheet of paper for writing, either to prevent marking on the sheets below or to provide a better surface for writing. They are usually referred to as pencil boards in English.

Shitajiki for handwriting are generally made of plastic about 1 to 2 mm in thickness, making them flexible but still durable. Typically, they are B5 sized (slightly smaller than U.S. letter size), although other sizes are also available (typically A4 or A5). Shitajiki for calligraphy are typically made of dark (blue or black) felt, and are available in a variety of sizes.

Merchandised shitajiki are very common, featuring images of everything from tourist attractions and celebrities to anime and manga characters. Most shitajiki designs only go through one print run, making them highly collectible and often difficult to acquire. Collecting shitajiki is a hobby for many anime and manga enthusiasts. As collectibles, shitajiki are also often used for decoration or other ornamental purposes.
