= Erlitou =

Archaeological site in Henan, China

- 二里頭 (Chinese)
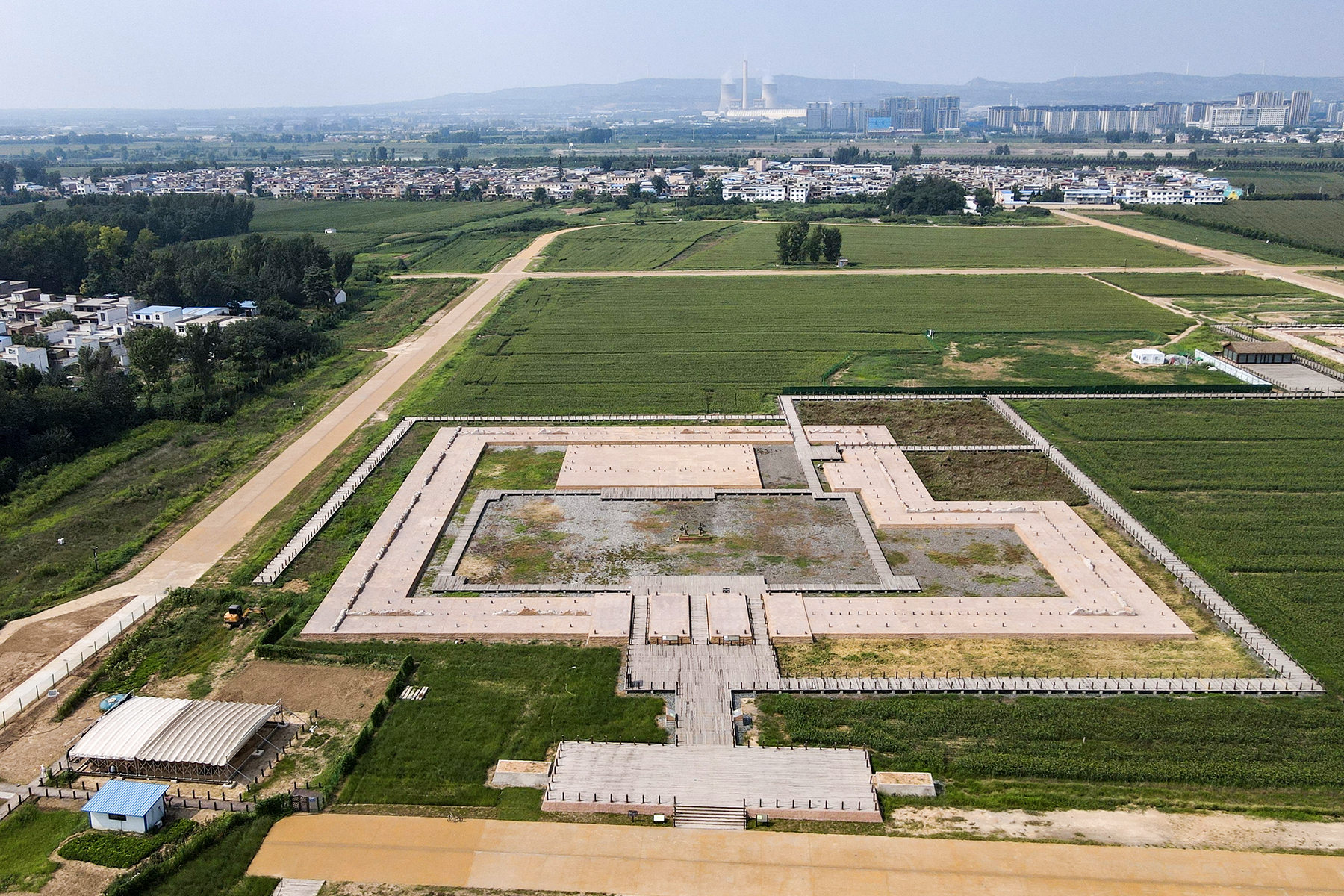
- Aerial view, 2024

- Location within Henan Erlitou (China)
- Interactive map of Erlitou
- 34°41′33″N 112°41′24″E
- Type: Settlement
- Cultures: Yangshao; Longshan; Erlitou; Erligang
- Location: South of Erlitou village, Yanshi, Luoyang, Henan, China

History
- Built: First period: c. 3500–3000 BCE; Second period: c. 1870 BCE
- Abandoned: First period: c. 2600 BCE; Second period: c. 1300 BCE

Site notes
- Area: 300 ha (740 acres) (Note: Including northern portions destroyed by the movement of the Luo, it may have been around 400 ha (990 acres) in area.)
- Discovered: 1959

Erlitou (Chinese: 二里头; pinyin: Èrlǐtou), also known as Yanshi Erlitou, is a Chinese archaeological site in the Yiluo Basin of Yanshi District, Luoyang, Henan. Discovered by survey teams led by archaeologist Xu Xusheng in 1959, it was initially identified as Bo, the first capital of the Shang dynasty. Some Chinese archaeologists later recognized it as the capital of the Xia—a dynasty of debated existence. A center of early Bronze Age China, Erlitou is the type site and largest settlement of the eponymous Erlitou culture. More limited occupation has been found from the earlier Yangshao and Longshan cultures and the later Erligang culture.

The site was the paramount settlement of a polity which spread across the Yiluo Basin and adjacent portions of the Mount Song region. The site lies south of what later is the Luo River; during its period of occupation, the settlement was on the river's northern bank. An initial Neolithic period of occupation, which saw settlements at the site, lasted from c. 3500–2600 BCE. After centuries of vacancy, a settlement emerged around 1860 BCE, and later became the largest settlement in the Yiluo Basin, possibly attracting waves of migrants. At its peak, it reached a population of around 24,000 residents and an area of around 300 hectares (740 acres). Centered around a palatial complex surrounded by rammed earth walls, the city became a center of bronze casting, pioneering piece-mold casting and the production of bronze ritual vessels. Turquoise and jade goods were also produced at the site, including ritual artifacts such as ceremonial weapons and turquoise-inlaid bronze plaques. Outside of the palatial complex, the settlement consists mostly of semi-subterranean houses intermixed with graves and tombs, mostly underlying houses, courtyards, and roads. There are no formal cemeteries, and tombs were placed sporadically and built over. The site contains the remains of the earliest known road network in China. A set of wagon tracks has been found on these roads.

In the later era, the site partially underlies three villages, which continue construction projects and development atop the site. Probing excavations are made by the Institute of Archaeology prior to development, while at times construction is done without archaeological involvement. The Chinese government declared Erlitou a national priority protected site in 1988 and a national archaeological park in 2022. In 2019, the Erlitou Site Museum of the Xia Capital opened near the site, exhibiting over 2,000 artifacts.

== Geography ==
Spread of the Erlitou culture in China, with the Erlitou site marked

Erlitou (also known as Yanshi Erlitou) is the type site of the eponymous Erlitou culture (c. 1900–1500 BCE) of ancient China—while a prior period of occupation dates to the earlier Yangshao and Longshan cultures (c. 3500–2600 BCE) of the Neolithic period. The Erlitou culture spans more than five hundred sites (Note: Only a portion of sites associated with the Erlitou culture have been excavated. In 2013, archaeologist Xu Hong estimated that over 100 of the 500 sites had been excavated.) across portions of Henan, Hebei, Shanxi, and Shaanxi; some of these have not been excavated, and have been identified with the culture through analysis of ceramic sherd finds. The Yiluo Basin and adjacent portions of Mount Song are the core territory of the culture, and possibly hosted a polity centered at Erlitou itself. The Yiluo Basin is an alluvial plain flanked by the Mangling hills to the north and mountain ranges on all other sides, forming natural defensive barriers. Combined with the somewhat fertile soils of the basin, this allowed for a higher population density.

During the time of the Erlitou culture, other settlements emerged in the basin. Shaochai, to the east of Erlitou, was the second largest settlement in the basin, and may have been a regional center which supported Erlitou through its position along the route to the Yellow River. Further east, sites such as Dashigu may have been associated with the Erlitou culture or served as the centers of other neighboring polities. Chinese archaeologists generally divide the settlement sites of the Erlitou culture into four tiers: small villages, secondary centers, regional centers, and the Erlitou site itself in the highest tier. Erlitou is larger than other sites of the culture, at around 3,000,000 square metres (740 acres); in comparison, most settlements of the culture are less than 100,000 square metres (25 acres), while particularly large sites such as Shaochai and Dashigu measure 600,000 square metres (150 acres).

Most other Erlitou sites are located along the central reaches of the Yellow River, while outlying sites with some similarities with the Erlitou have been found along the Yangtze and Dan River. While it is not the earliest culture within China which made use of bronze, it is the first within the Central Plains, and is considered to mark the beginning of the Chinese Bronze Age. The Erlitou people were the creators of the first ritual bronzes in China through compound molds, an artistic tradition which would remain somewhat prominent within the political and religious culture of the Central Plains into the first millennium BCE.

Erlitou is located in Yanshi District, Luoyang, between three modern villages which partially or fully overlie the site; Erlitou to the north, Gedangtou to the southeast, and Sijiaolou to the south. Another village, Beixu, lies immediately adjacent to the northwestern end of the site. It is adjacent to the Luo River, upstream from its confluence with the Yi to form the Yiluo, which drains into the Yellow River to the north. During its period of occupation, Erlitou was on the northern bank of the Luo. The river moved to the north of the site during the Tang Dynasty (618–907 CE); portions of the site may have been destroyed during the river's change in course. Outside of the main settlement area, some scattered ruins associated with the site which have been found on the northern side of the Luo.

== History and periodization ==
During the last portion (c. 3500–3000 BCE) of the Yangshao culture, three settlements existed at the site on its western, southern, and eastern extents. From about 3000–2600, during the period of the Longshan culture, these were succeeded by another settlement at the southern end of the site. After this, the site was abandoned for centuries, before it was reoccupied by the Erlitou culture, beginning a primary period of occupation lasting from c. 1860–1545. The history of the site as part of the Erlitou culture (a period of roughly 360 years) has been divided into four phases, numbered I through IV.

During Phase I, the Erlitou site exceed 100 hectares (250 acres) and became the largest known settlement in the Yiluo Basin. Its growth was possibly fueled by migration from the surrounding region. The layout of the site during this period is uncertain, as the stratum was disrupted by occupants in later periods. The population of the settlement engaged in agriculture and artisanry. The production of bronze, ceramics and bone tools were local industries, each delegated to workshops in portions of the site. Knives are the only bronze objects from this phase, found alongside slag from bronze casting.

Erlitou expanded during Phase II, reaching its maximum size of around 300 hectares (740 acres). (Note: Including northern portions destroyed by the movement of the Luo, it may have been around 400 hectares (990 acres) in area.) The number of known burials and tools at the site tripled. While no houses or kilns have been discovered from Phase I, the remains of seven homes and one kiln are attested from Phase II. In the southeastern portion of the site, a palace complex of rammed earth buildings was constructed, enclosed by a set of four roads. Production of bone tools, bronze, and ceramics continued, while turquoise production may have begun.

During Phase III, craft production and population density increased, and the city reached its peak population. The palace structures built in Phase II were superseded by six new structures built in a more organized pattern. The new palace complex, larger in area, had fewer storage pits and wells, indicating that the area was possibly used by a group of elites. Production of agricultural tools in the city decreased relative to the production of crafts and arrowheads, the latter of which increased tenfold from Phase II. Development continued during Phase IV, which saw new buildings erected in the palatial complex. Bronze production increased in number and quantity during the phase.

As Erlitou reached its peak, fortified settlements of the Erligang culture began to emerge in the surrounding region. The city was eclipsed by the Yanshi Shang City, a fortified Erligang settlement about 6 km (3.7 mi) to the northeast. As estimates for Phase IV (c. 1560–1520) overlap with the early subperiod (c. 1600–1415) of the Erligang, the production of traditional Erlitou-style pottery may have continued at Erlitou after the beginning of Erligang pottery production at Yanshi. By the latter portion of the Erligang (ending around 1300), production of goods such as bronzes had ceased, and the settlement became a village around 30 hectares (74 acres) in area, centered on what was once the palace complex. The remains of houses, ash pits, and burials are attested from this period. After the end of the Erligang culture, the settlement was abandoned. During Erlitou's decline, the Zhengzhou Shang City, about 85 km (53 mi) to the east, also emerged as a regional center. Zhengzhou's metallurgical technology shows similarities to Erlitou, suggesting that craftsmen from Erlitou may have migrated to the new city as Erlitou declined.

Exact estimates for the dates of the Erlitou culture at the site vary. Radiocarbon dating measures taken during the 20th century indicate a date range of 1900–1500 BC for the Erlitou culture remains at the site, while accelerator mass spectrometry dates published for Erlitou culture remains at Xinzhai and Erlitou in 2007 gave a range of 1750–1530.

== Layout ==
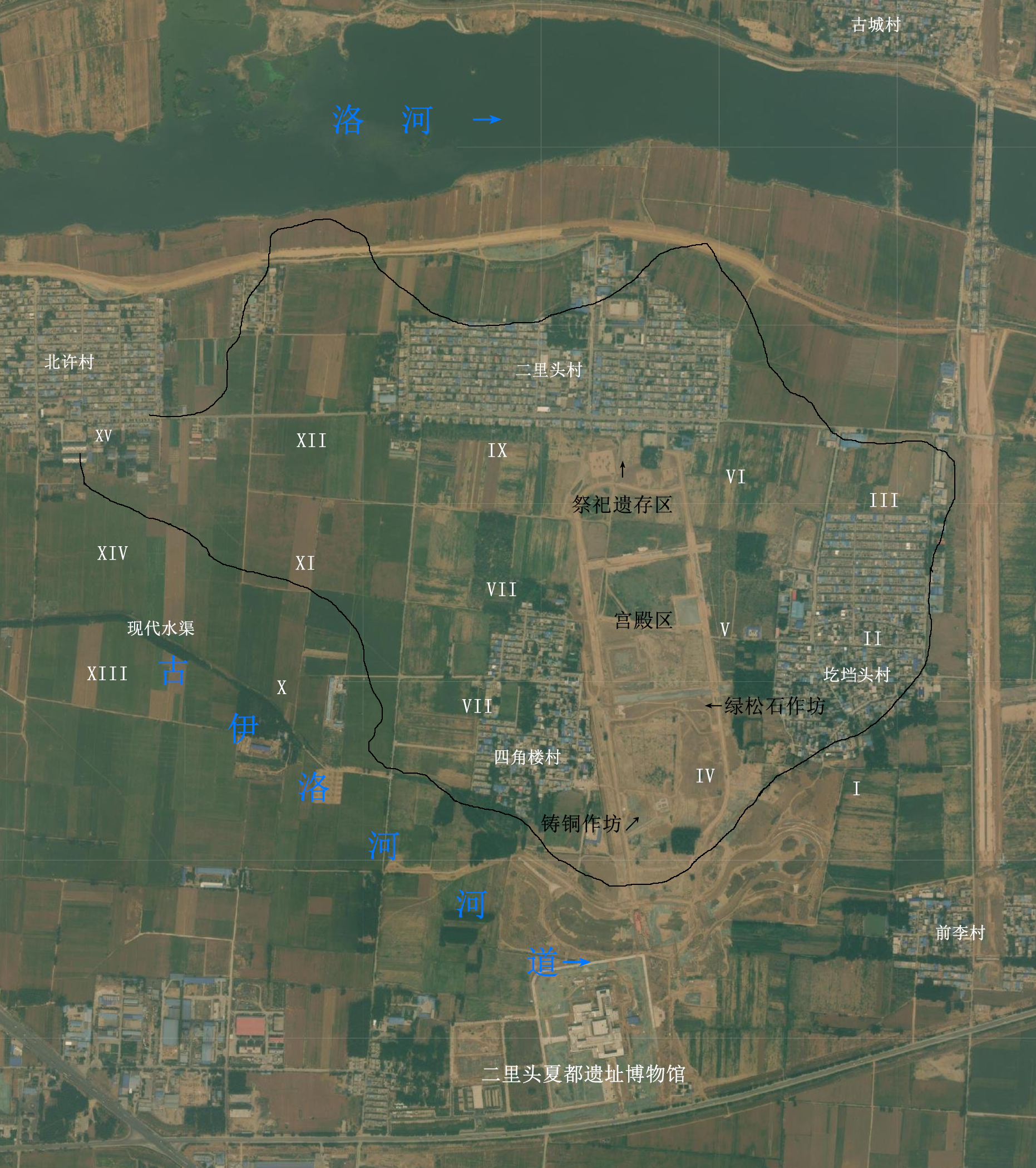
Extent of the Erlitou site (in black outline) compared to the modern surroundings

The site stretches around 2,400 m (7,900 ft) east-west and 1,900 m (6,200 ft) north-south, with an area of around 300 hectares (740 acres); including northern portions destroyed by the movement of the Luo River, the settlement may have totaled around 400 hectares (990 acres) in area. One study estimated that the site had between 18,000 and 30,000 residents, with a mean around 24,000.

=== Palatial complex ===
The palatial complex, near the center of the site, was an enclosed rectangular area at least 12 hectares (30 acres) in area at its peak. It formed the original core of the city prior to expansion. The purpose of the palatial complex (宫城; gongcheng), also referred to as a palace complex or palace city, remains a matter of academic contention. The purposes of the site may have changed over time. In 1991, historian Robert Thorp critiqued the complex's identification as a palace, theorizing that the structures were likely gathering or ritual spaces, as large audiences could congregate within their courtyards.

The complex was divided into two clusters of buildings on the western and eastern ends of the enclosure. To the west of the complex was a structure referred to by archaeologists as Foundation 1, an irregularly-shaped rammed-earth platform built during Phase III which measures 107 m × 99 m (351 ft × 325 ft), with a total area of around 1 hectare (2.5 acres). A series of covered corridors enclosed this platform, creating a courtyard for a wooden building on the northern end. One 1979 study estimated that the foundation would have taken 200,000 person-days to construct, not including the management and the logistics required for such a large project.

The eastern portion of the complex contains the remains of structural foundations. Foundation 3 measures more than 50 by 150 metres (160 ft × 490 ft), and contains three courtyards. It was built during Phase II, predating the surrounding wall. A 3 m (9.8 ft) passageway containing a wooden drainage ditch separates it from another structure. During Phase III, two more structures were built atop these layers. One of these, Foundation 2, is a rectangular platform, measuring 73 by 53 metres (240 ft × 174 ft) in area and 3 m (9.8 ft) in depth. On top of the platform laid an enclosed courtyard containing a wood and wattle-and-daub structure on the northern end. Another foundation was built on the site during Phase IV. Archaeologist Xu Hong proposed that the layout of the structures shares intense similarities with descriptions of Western Zhou architecture, and evidences continuity between Erlitou and Zhou ritual practice.

Rammed-earth walls, about 2 m (6.6 ft) thick, were built around the palatial complex and an adjacent cluster of turquoise and bronze workshops to the south. The enclosure of the workshops, roughly 1 ha (2.5 acres) in area, possibly indicates that they received state support. The city lacks an outer wall; similar urban plans, with a walled palace surrounded by an unwalled city, would remain in the following millennium.

=== Smaller buildings and infrastructure ===
Elite residences are located immediately adjacent to the palatial complex. The residences of commoners are located at a lower elevation in the western part of the site. The residences of commoners are semi-subterranean structures ranging from 3–5 m^{2} (32–54 ft^{2}). Medium-sized buildings, generally to the north of the palatial complex, vary from tens to hundreds of square meters in size. They are generally one-roomed, while some have multiple. They are thought to be either residences or areas for meetings and ritual offerings. To the north of the palatial area is a ceremonial complex, evidenced by buildings with detached burials.

Roads, generally between 10 and 20 metres (33 and 66 ft) wide, flank each side of the palatial complex with intersections at each corner, forming a shape resembling a number sign (#). This is the earliest known urban road network in China. A set of parallel wagon tracks spaced about 1 m (3 ft) apart were found on the road at the southern end of the palatial complex, the earliest known evidence of wagon use in China. It is unknown if the vehicle was pulled by humans or animals. The width between suggests a smaller vehicle than the horse-drawn chariots of the Late Shang, the earliest confirmed evidence of domesticated horses in China.

=== Tombs and burials ===
The tombs of elites and commoners are located near their respective residential areas. More than 400 graves have been discovered during excavations at the site. In contrast to the cemeteries of Neolithic and Late Shang settlements, there are no formal areas set aside for burials. Tombs are located haphazardly, adjacent to or directly underlying houses, courtyards, and roads. These tombs are generally found by themselves or in clusters arranged in rows. Land use appears to have alternated between tombs and houses, and so tomb sites were possibly used for shorter intervals. Archaeologists such as Liu Li have theorized that this sharp distinction from other Chinese mortuary traditions stems from Erlitou's demographic composition of migrants from many unrelated small kin groups.

Two particularly dense assemblages of elite tombs are located to the north and northeast of the complex. Ceramic vessels are the most common grave goods found at Erlitou, while in the tombs of elites, bronze ritual vessels, turquoise, and jade have also been found. Some graves have no grave goods, while some contain a secondary ledge within the grave and a coffin. The largest tomb at the site is 5.2 by 4.5 metres (17 ft × 15 ft) and 6 metres (20 ft) deep, with the remains of a wooden coffin. The ornamentation of the tomb is unknown, as it was looted in antiquity. About ten of the largest graves have traces of wooden coffins with cinnabar dye, which possibly had ritual significance.

Some graves have been found without proper burial whatsoever, whether found within a suspected sacrificial area or disposed in pits. Some of these skeletons are incomplete, while others show evidence of bound hands and feet.

== Artifacts ==
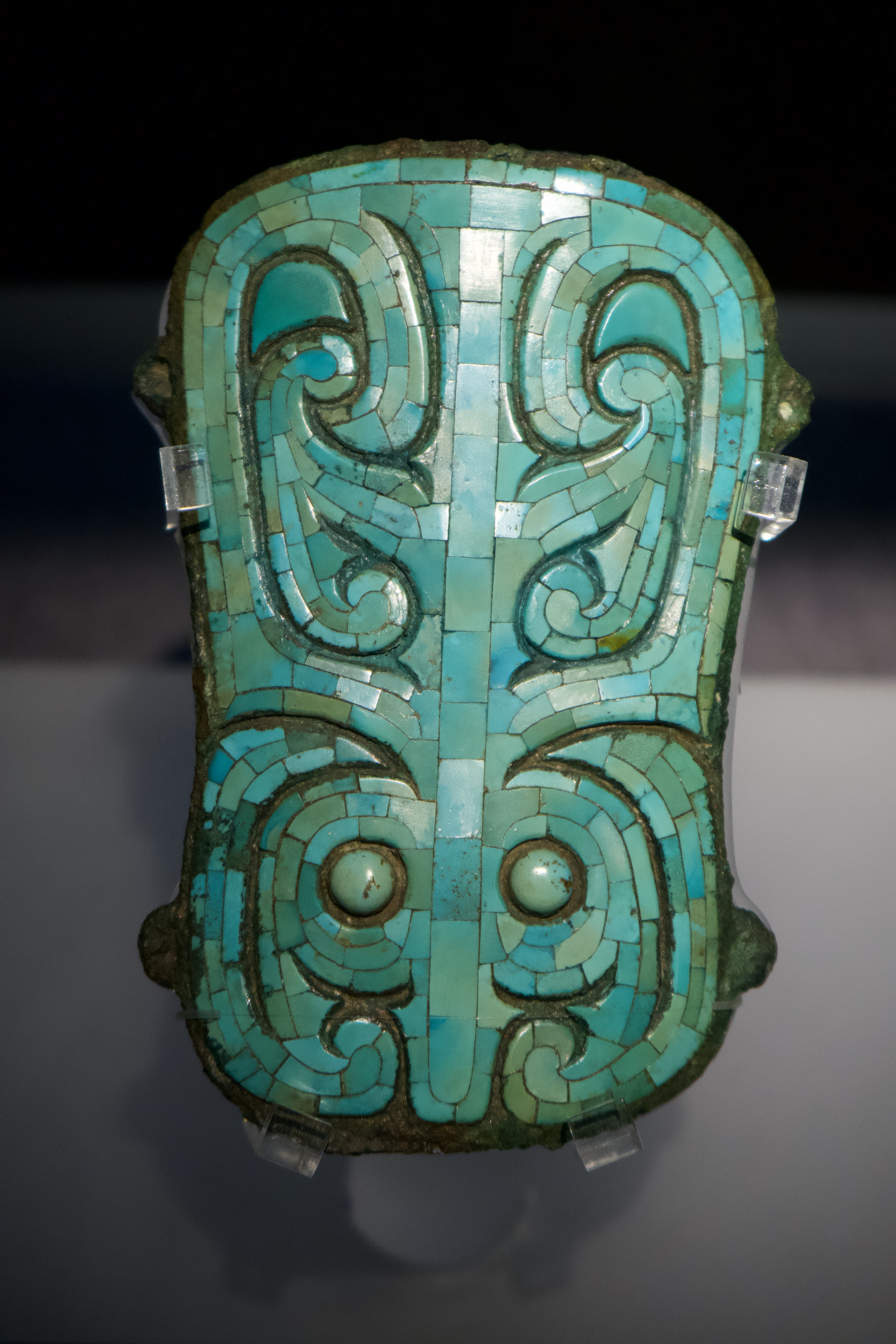
A turquoise-inlaid bronze plaque recovered from Erlitou

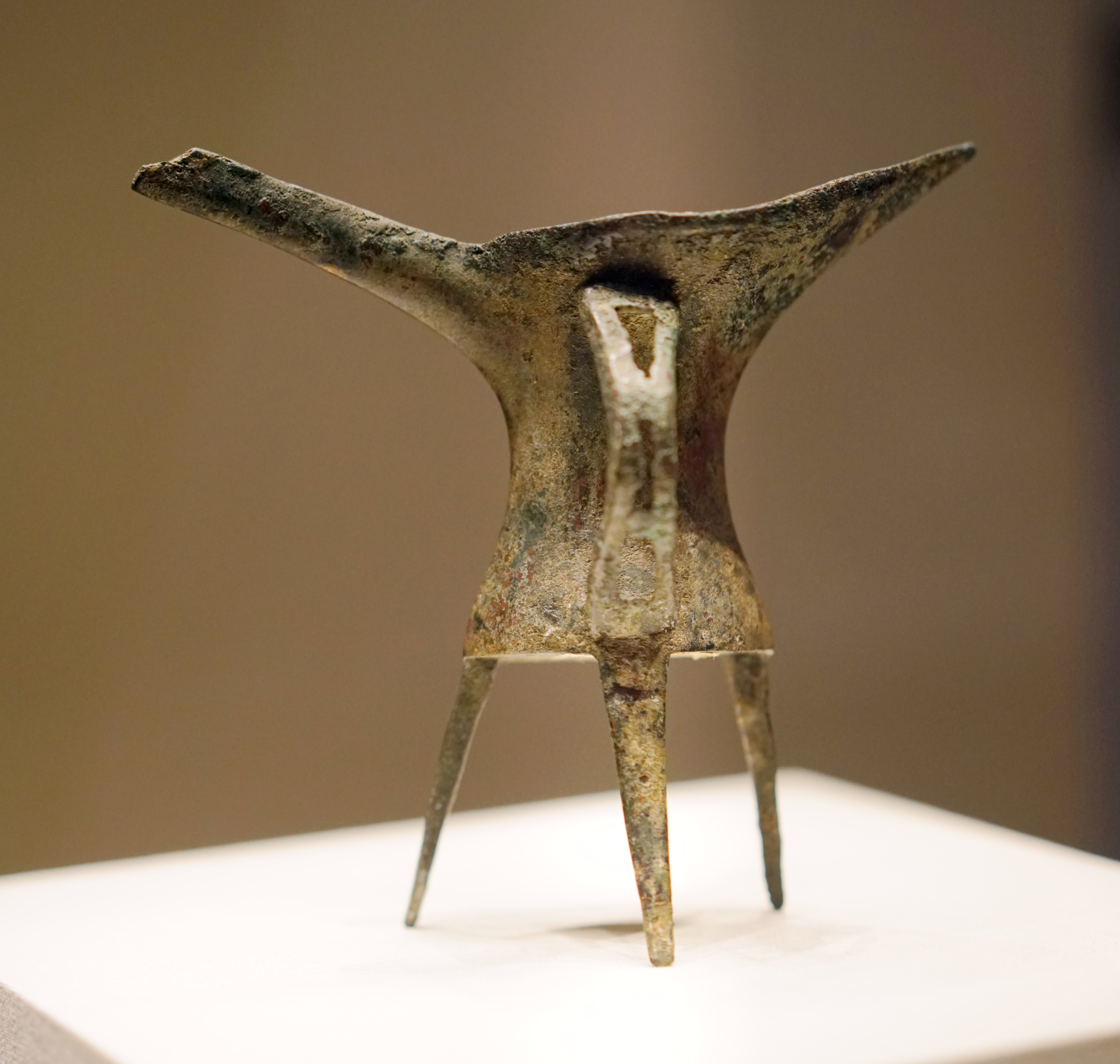
A jue, a form of ritual bronze vessel, recovered from Erlitou

While it may not have been the earliest site in China to cast bronze and copper—sites of the Qijia and Huoshaogou cultures did so roughly contemporaneously—Erlitou was the first confirmed to produce bronze ritual vessels. This practice may have originated in Longshan sites; a slightly rounded copper fragment from the Wangchenggang site in Dengfeng (Note: Sometimes identified with Yangcheng, the first Xia capital.) may have been part of a ritual vessel. Bronze ritual vessels were produced at Erlitou by Phase III. Seventeen have been found at the site. The most common of these are drinking cups, jia and jue, while a he and a ding (tripodal vessels) have also been recovered from the site. Associated with powerful elites and religious power, they are found in elite burials and residential areas. The Erlitou site appears to have monopolized the production and distribution of the Erlitou culture's ritual vessels. Animal bones, especially those of pigs and cattle, have been recovered from the site. About one-fifth of these are burnt, evidencing that meat was roasted, possibly in ding.

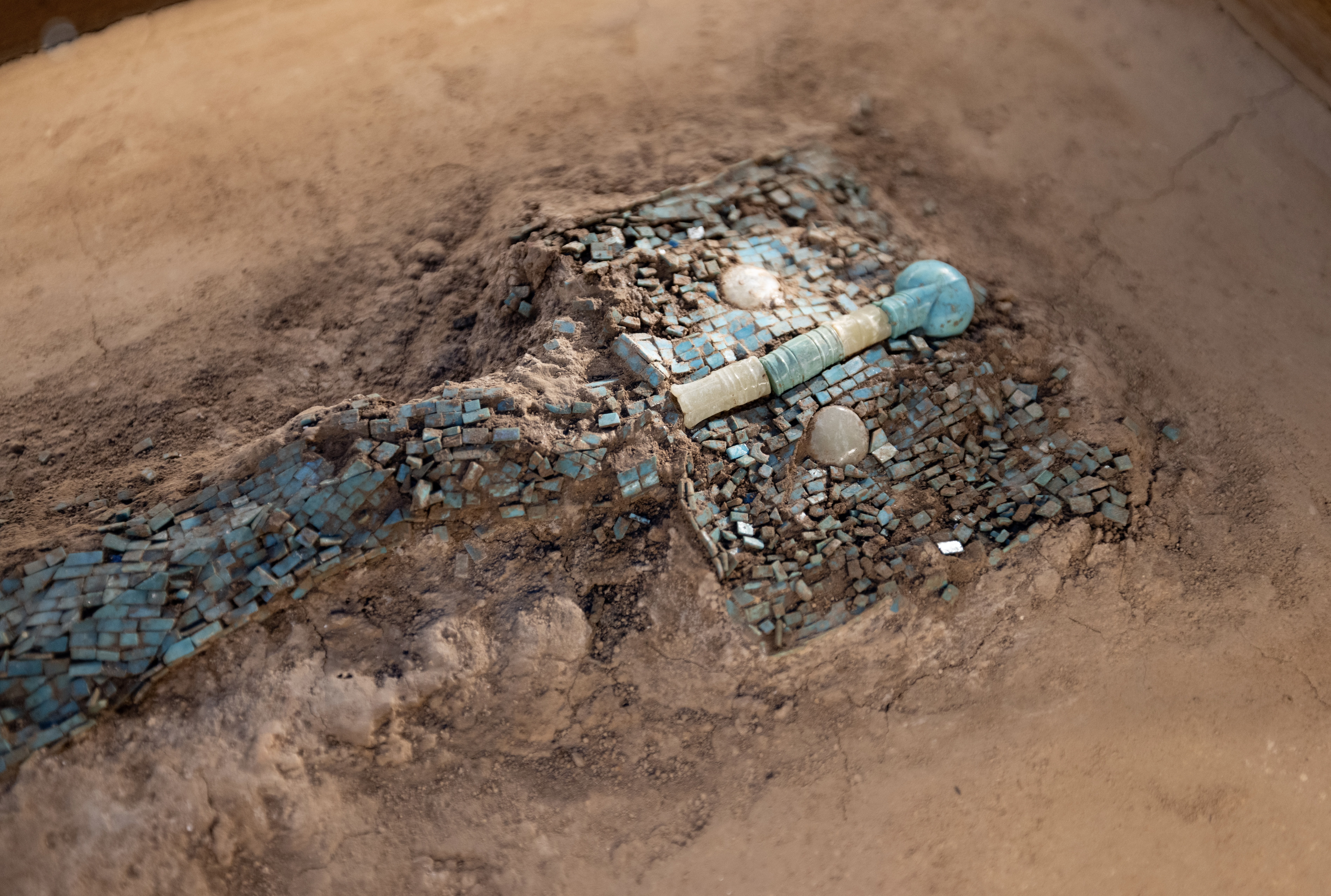
The head of the turquoise dragon-form artifact recovered from Erlitou

Turquoise fragments have been found concentrated along a suspected workshop at the southern portion of the palatial complex wall. Characteristic turquoise-inlaid bronze plaques have been found in elite burials from Phase III onward. One particularly large artifact recovered from the site, a dragon sculpture composed of 2,000 pieces of turquoise and jade, has been found as a grave good. Jade objects such as daggers, axes, tablets, and dagger-axes, and ceremonial bronze weapons such as yue axes have also been recovered.

Alongside copper and lead, metal objects recovered from Erlitou were fashioned out of tin–copper, lead–copper, tin–lead-copper, and arsenic–copper alloys; tin–lead–copper is the most frequently attested of these alloys, while the exact proportions of each metal vary between artifacts. Piece-mold casting was either invented or refined at Erlitou, a technology possibly utilized by a select group of craftsmen affiliated with the Erlitou elite. The technique requires a degree of technical mastery and thus possibly indicates an advanced division of labour and a stratified society. The casting technique allowed for the creation of the ritual vessels; this separated the culture from other Bronze Age cultures in the surrounding region, which less frequently cast bronze objects for ritual purposes. Piece-mold casting is only attested at Erlitou, while other sites used stone molds. The earliest bronze-cast objects at Erlitou, made with the piece-mold technique, are ling bells. These first appear in the archaeological record during Phase II.

Metallurgical artifacts recovered from the workshop area include crucibles, slag, lead sheets, and charcoal. Ceramic piece-molds have been found, generally external molds which were discarded after casting. Apparently used to produce vessels around 30 cm (12 in) in diameter, they have polished linings, which were sometimes decorated with patterns such as animal motifs. Bronze tools such as adzes, chisels, and fishhooks have also been recovered from the site.

As it was located within a floodplain, the resources in the immediate vicinity of the city were mostly restricted to agricultural products, necessitating imports from the surrounding region and further afield. Prestige goods such as proto-celadon wares and jade artifacts were also imported.

== Excavation and analysis ==
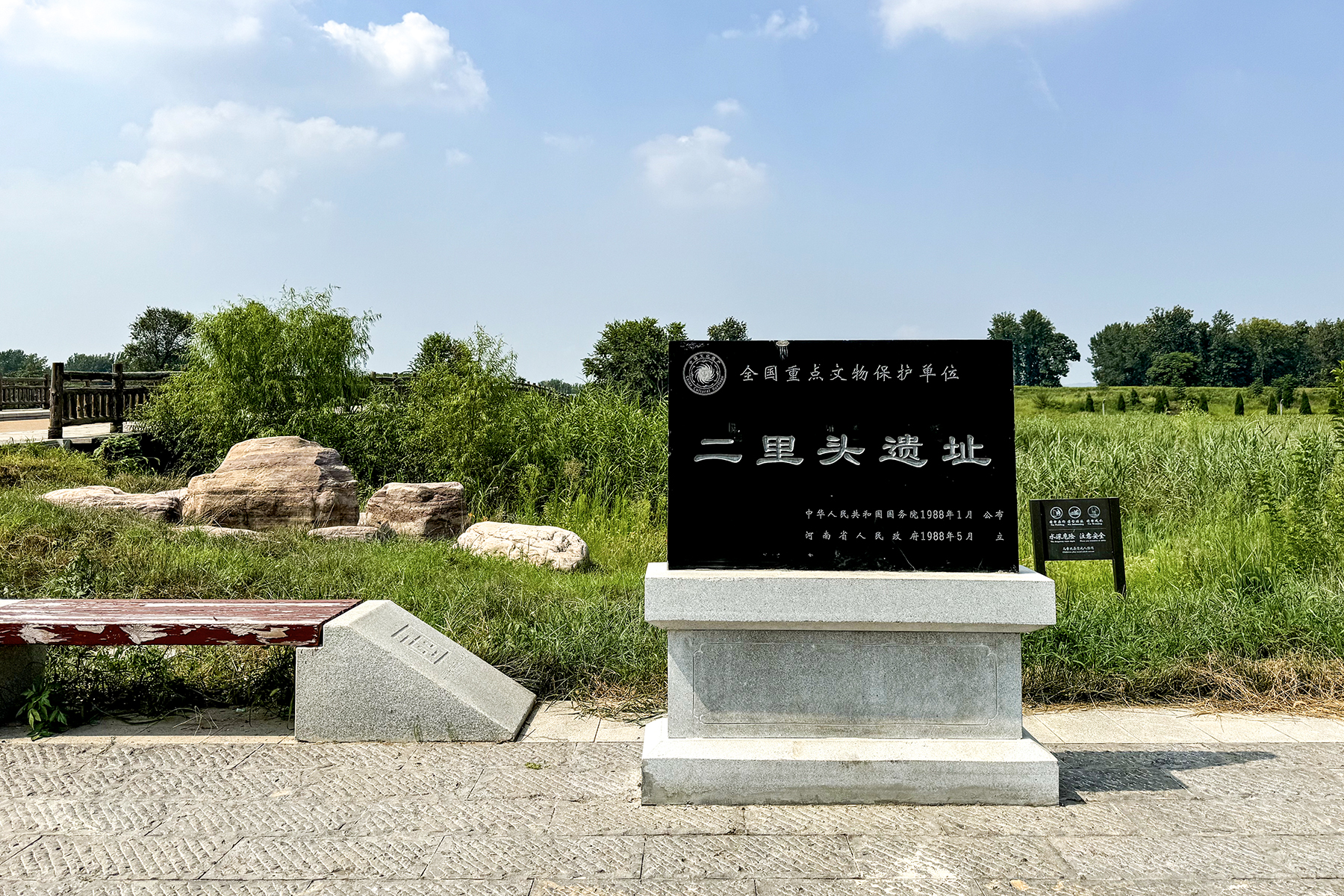
Erlitou National Archaeology Park

Based on textual analysis, Chinese archaeologist Xu Xusheng theorized that the area around Luoyang may have been one of the core regions of the semi-legendary Xia dynasty, and led a series of field surveys in the area during the 1950s. Surveys at Yanshi discovered the Erlitou site, and a team from the Institute of Archaeology, Chinese Academy of Social Sciences began excavations in 1959, discovering uncovering material dating from the Longshan to the Shang. The field team made eight other excavations from 1960 to 1964, and published a report on the site the following year. In 1974, another Institute of Archaeology team uncovered a portion of the western palatial foundation, while the other area of foundations was uncovered in 1977. These investigations solidified the four stage division of the site's chronology.

The Institute of Archaeology continued excavations at the site throughout the 1980s. In 1980, an excavation made in conjunction with a construction project found material from phases II, III, and IV, and helped to identify as the fourth stage as contemporary to the Erligang. In 1999, the Institute of Archaeology shifted from an approach largely focused on typology and stratigraphy to other forms of settlement archaeology, probing soils and investigating the layout and paleoenviroment of the site. A multinational archaeological team including researchers from China, the United States, Australia, and the United Kingdom surveyed the Yiluo Basin from 1997 to 2002, with a focus on geoarchaeology, archaeobotany, and pottery analysis.

The discovery of Erlitou was recognized as a major advance in urban culture and development within China, while other sites from the 3rd millennium BCE of a similar size to Erlitou have since been discovered elsewhere in China. The site has become a case study for research into the early history of urbanization in China. Alongside excavations of residential areas and workshops, archaeologists have made broader regional surveys in the Yiluo basin to study settlement patterns.

=== Identification ===
Xu Xusheng identified the Erlitou site with Bo, the capital founded by the first Shang king Tang, which some texts placed at Yanshi. According to the Bamboo Annals, Bo was the capital for the reign of the first eight kings, before a series of capital changes during the reigns of Zhong Ding through Pan Geng, who moved the capital to its final site of Yin. Unlike all previous capitals, the presence of written records has allowed Yin's identification with the Yinxu site at Anyang. The site of Bo, the other Shang capital, has been identified with one of three sites; Erlitou, Shixianggou (also in Yanshi District), or Zhengzhou.

Erlitou's identification with Bo was the academic consensus in China until archaeologist Zou Heng proposed in 1978 that it was actually the site of the Xia capital, while the newly discovered Zhengzhou Shang City was the historic Bo. This sparked academic debate among Chinese archaeologists on the identification of the site—Phases I through IV have all been identified with either dynasty by scholars. Excavation teams at the site generally placed the site within the Xia–Shang transition, often identifying the rapid development which began in Phase III with the beginning of the Shang dynasty. The discovery of the Yanshi Shang City (founded contemporaneously with Phase IV) in the 1980s sparked another round of discourse; by the end of the 1990s, Chinese scholars generally identified Phases I through III with the Xia, and Phase IV with the early Shang. Proponents of this theory point to the abandonment of Foundation No. 1. Initially thought to have been abandoned during Phase IV, a 1999 Institute of Archaeology report reinterpreted some portions of the temple (which were previously placed within Phase III or thought of as undatable) as belonging to Phase III.

According to historian Sima Qian's 1st century BCE Shiji, the Xia dynasty was the first dynasty of Chinese history. It states that it was founded by Yu the Great, and thirty kings of the dynasty ruled over a period of 400 years before it was superseded by the Shang. The existence of the Xia dynasty remains a matter of historical debate. Chinese historians and archaeologists generally interpret later historical materials such as the Bamboo Annals and Shiji as sufficient evidence for the dynasty's existence, especially as they recorded the list of Shang kings with relative accuracy. Unlike the oracle bones of the Shang, no contemporary writings exist to attest the Xia dynasty, and no Shang sources mention the Xia. They may have been a group only later reinterpreted as a dynastic state. Some Western Sinologists—and a minority of historians and archaeologists within China—are critical of the historicity of the Xia, and doubt that the Erlitou culture can be unambiguously equated to a "Xia culture".

From 1996 to 1999, the State Council-backed Xia–Shang–Zhou Chronology Project attempted to standardize the chronology of the early Chinese dynasties. Relying on historical texts and archaeological data, the project supported the historicity of the Xia and produced date ranges of 2070–1600 BCE for the Xia and 1600–1046 for the Shang. Among those sympathetic to the historicity of the Xia, some historians and archaeologists outside of China were critical of the report; some disagreed with the presented dates or believed that firm date ranges could not be established for the dynasty. As establishing the antiquity of civilization in China was seen as a matter of national pride, academic discourse on the subject became politicized in the aftermath of the chronology project. Regardless of the dynasty's existence, the exact connection between the Xia and the Erlitou site remains a matter of active academic debate in Chinese scholarship.

== Conservation ==
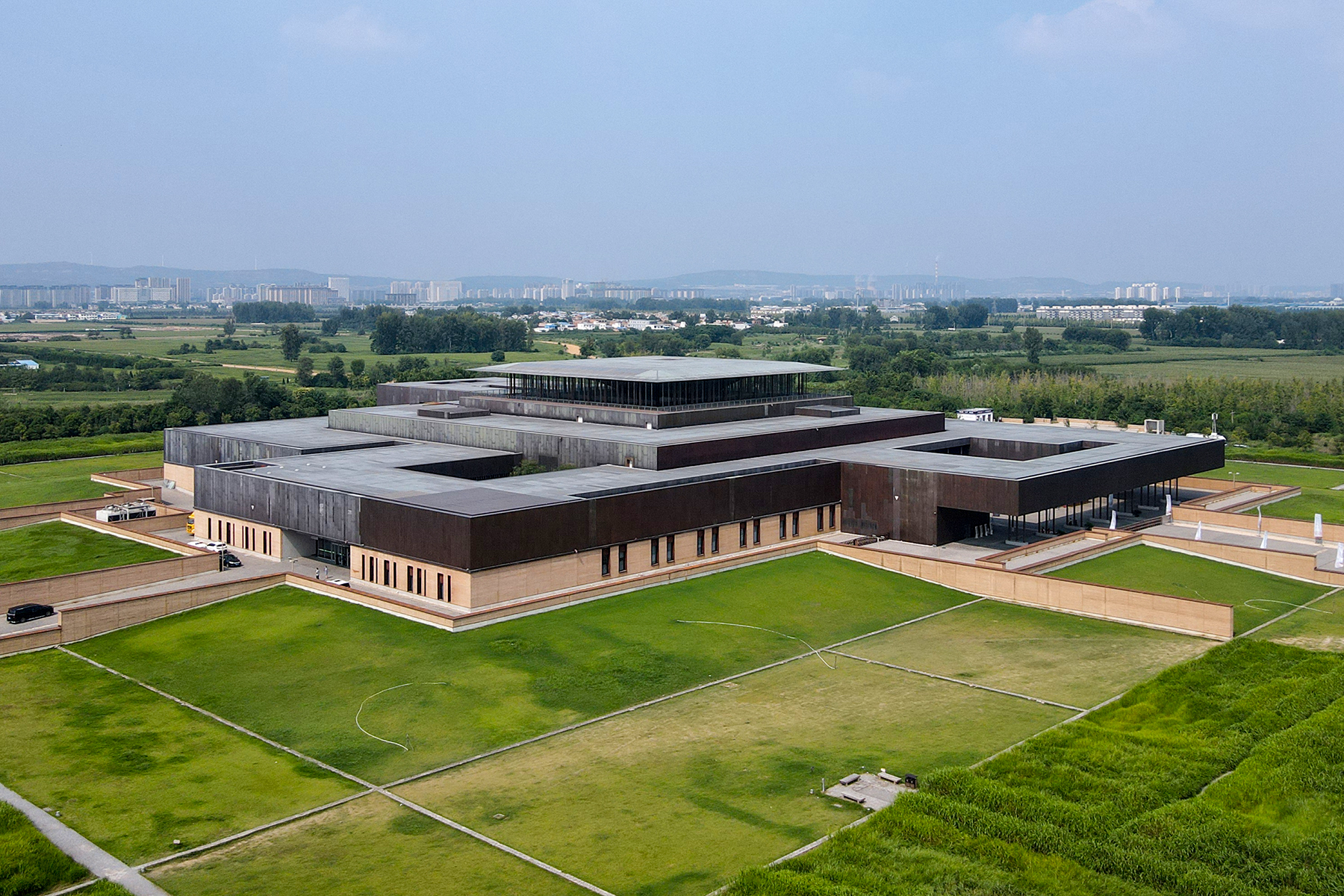
The Erlitou Site Museum of the Xia Capital

Past agricultural activities have removed some of the top levels of the ancient deposits at Erlitou. Construction projects continue in the three overlying villages. Probing excavations are made by the Institute of Archaeology prior to development, while at times construction is done without archaeological involvement. Some bronze vessels from the site were removed from the site by construction workers during an unsanctioned dig; these were later recovered by the Ministry of Public Security.

The Ministry of Culture and State Council declared Erlitou a national priority protected site in January 1988, while the National Cultural Heritage Administration established a National Archaeological Park at the site in 2022. In October 2019, the Erlitou Site Museum of the Xia Capital opened near the site. It exhibits over 2,000 artifacts, including 112 first-class national cultural relics, a legal designation for cultural relics exhibiting "especially important historical, artistic, or scientific value".

== See also ==
- List of Major National Historical and Cultural Sites in Henan

== Notes ==
=== Bibliography ===
- Allan, Sarah (2007). "Erlitou and the Formation of Chinese Civilization: Toward a New Paradigm". Journal of Asian Studies. 66 (2): 461–496. doi:10.1017/S002191180700054X.
- Campbell, Roderick B. (2014). Archaeology of the Chinese Bronze Age: From Erlitou to Anyang. UCLA Cotsen Institute of Archaeology. ISBN 9781931745987.
- Chen, Chun; Gong, Xin (2018). "Erlitou and Xia: A Dispute Between Chinese and Overseas Scholars". Social Evolution & History. 17 (2): 235–257. doi:10.30884/seh/2018.02.13.
- Chen, Minzhen (2019). "Faithful History or Unreliable History: Three Debates on the Historicity of the Xia Dynasty". Journal of Chinese Humanities. 5 (1). Translated by Fordham, Carl Gene: 78–104. doi:10.1163/23521341-12340073. ISSN 2352-1333.
- Huber, Louisa G. Fitzgerald (1988). "The Bo Capital and Questions Concerning Xia and Early Shang". Early China. 13: 46–77. doi:10.1017/S0362502800005204. JSTOR 23351321.
- Lau, Timothy (2011). "The Grading of Cultural Relics in Chinese Law". International Journal of Cultural Property. 18 (1): 1–35. doi:10.1017/S0940739111000075.
- Li, Min (2018). Social Memory and State Formation in Early China. Cambridge University Press. doi:10.1017/9781316493618. ISBN 9781316493618.
- Liu, Li; Chen, Xingcan (2012). The Archaeology of China: From the Late Paleolithic to the Early Bronze Age. Cambridge University Press. doi:10.1017/CBO9781139015301. ISBN 9781139015301.
- Liu, Li; Xu, Hong (2007). "Rethinking Erlitou: Legend, History and Chinese Archaeology". Antiquity. 81 (314): 886–901. doi:10.1017/S0003598X00095983.
- Liu, Li (2009). "Urbanization in China: Erlitou and Its Hinterland". In Storey, Glenn (ed.). Urbanism in the Preindustrial World: Cross-Cultural Approaches. University of Alabama Press. pp. 161–189. ISBN 9780817352462.
- Shelach, Gideon; Jaffe, Yitzhak (2014). "The Earliest States in China: A Long-Term Trajectory Approach". Journal of Archaeological Research. 22 (4): 327–364. doi:10.1007/s10814-014-9074-8.
- Thorp, Robert L. (1991). "Erlitou and the Search for the Xia". Early China. 16: 1–38. doi:10.1017/S0362502800003825. JSTOR 23351500.
- Thorp, Robert L. (2006). China in the Early Bronze Age: Shang Civilization. University of Pennsylvania Press. ISBN 9780812203615. JSTOR j.ctt3fhxmw.
- von Falkenhausen, Lothar (2006). "Zou Heng, 1927–2005". Artibus Asiae. 66 (1): 181–197. doi:10.61342/HZVX8372. JSTOR 25261846.
- Xu, Hong (2013). "The Erlitou Culture". In Underhill, Anne P. (ed.). A Companion to Chinese Archaeology. Blackwell Publishing. pp. 300–322. doi:10.1002/9781118325698. ISBN 9781444335293.
- Xu, Hong (2018). "Erlitou: The Origin of the Tradition of Non-Fortified Primary Capitals in Early China". Archaeological Research in Asia. 14: 71–79. doi:10.1016/j.ara.2017.11.003.
- Xu, Hong; Li, Xiang (2021). "Settlements, Buildings, and Society of the Erlitou Culture". In Childs-Johnson, Elizabeth (ed.). The Oxford Handbook of Early China. Oxford University Press. pp. 176–189. doi:10.1093/oxfordhb/9780199328369.001.0001. ISBN 9780199328369.

=== Further reading ===
- Han, Jianye (2024). The Making of the Chinese Civilization. Translated by Liu, Zequan; Hou, Jian; Mei, Bing; Qiu, Siping. Springer Science+Business Media. doi:10.1007/978-981-99-4213-8. ISBN 9789819942121.
- Kessler, Adam Theodore (1989). The Erlitou Site: Evidence for the Contemporaneity of Late Xia and Early Shang Dynastic Kings (PhD thesis). University of California Los Angeles. ProQuest 303681118.
- Jaang, Li (2022). "Erlitou: The Making of a Secondary State and a New Sociopolitical Order in Early Bronze Age China". Journal of Archaeological Research. 31 (2): 209–262. doi:10.1007/s10814-022-09173-9.
- Xie, Liye; Daudjee, Zahid; Lee, Chen Fu; Sebillaud, Pauline (2020). "Settlement Relocation, Urban Construction, and Social Transformation in China's Central Plain, 2300–1500 B.C." (PDF). Asian Perspectives. 59 (2): 299–329. doi:10.1353/asi.2020.0016.
- Xu, Hong; Chen, Guoliang; Zhao, Haitao (2005). "A Preliminary Investigation of the Settlement Pattern of the Erlitou Site". Chinese Archaeology. 5 (1): 13–18. doi:10.1515/CHAR.2005.5.1.13.
- Xu, Hong, ed. (2014). 夏商都邑与文化：纪念二里头遗址发现55周年学术研讨会论文集 [Capitals and Cultures of the Xia and Shang Dynasties: Proceedings of the Academic Symposium to Commemorate the 55th Anniversary of the Discovery of the Erlitou Site] (in Chinese). China Social Sciences Press. ISBN 9787516149553.
- Zhang, Chi; Pollard, A. Mark; Rawson, Jessica; Huan, Limin; Liu, Ruiliang; Tang, Xiaojia (2019). "China's Major Late Neolithic Centres and the Rise of Erlitou". Antiquity. 93 (369): 588–603. doi:10.15184/aqy.2019.63.
- Zhang, Junna; Zhang, Xiaohu; Xia, Zhengkai; Xu, Hong; Zhao, Haitao (2019). "Geomorphic Changes Along the Yiluo River Influenced the Emergence of the First Urban Center at the Erlitou Site, Central Plains of China". Quaternary International. 521: 90–103. Bibcode:2019QuInt.521...90Z. doi:10.1016/j.quaint.2019.06.038.
- Zhang, Xuelian; Qiu, Shihua; Cai, Lianzhen; Xu, Hong; Zhang, Haitao; Chen, Guoliang (2022). "14C Dating of the Erlitou Site". Radiocarbon. 64 (4): 819–832. Bibcode:2022Radcb..64..819Z. doi:10.1017/RDC.2021.72.
- Zhao, Haitao (2021). "New Insights into the Settlement Patterns of the Capital City at Erlitou". Chinese Archaeology. 21 (1). Translated by Gao, Yuting: 167–172. doi:10.1515/char-2021-0012.
