= Ling (bell) =

Ancient Chinese musical instrument

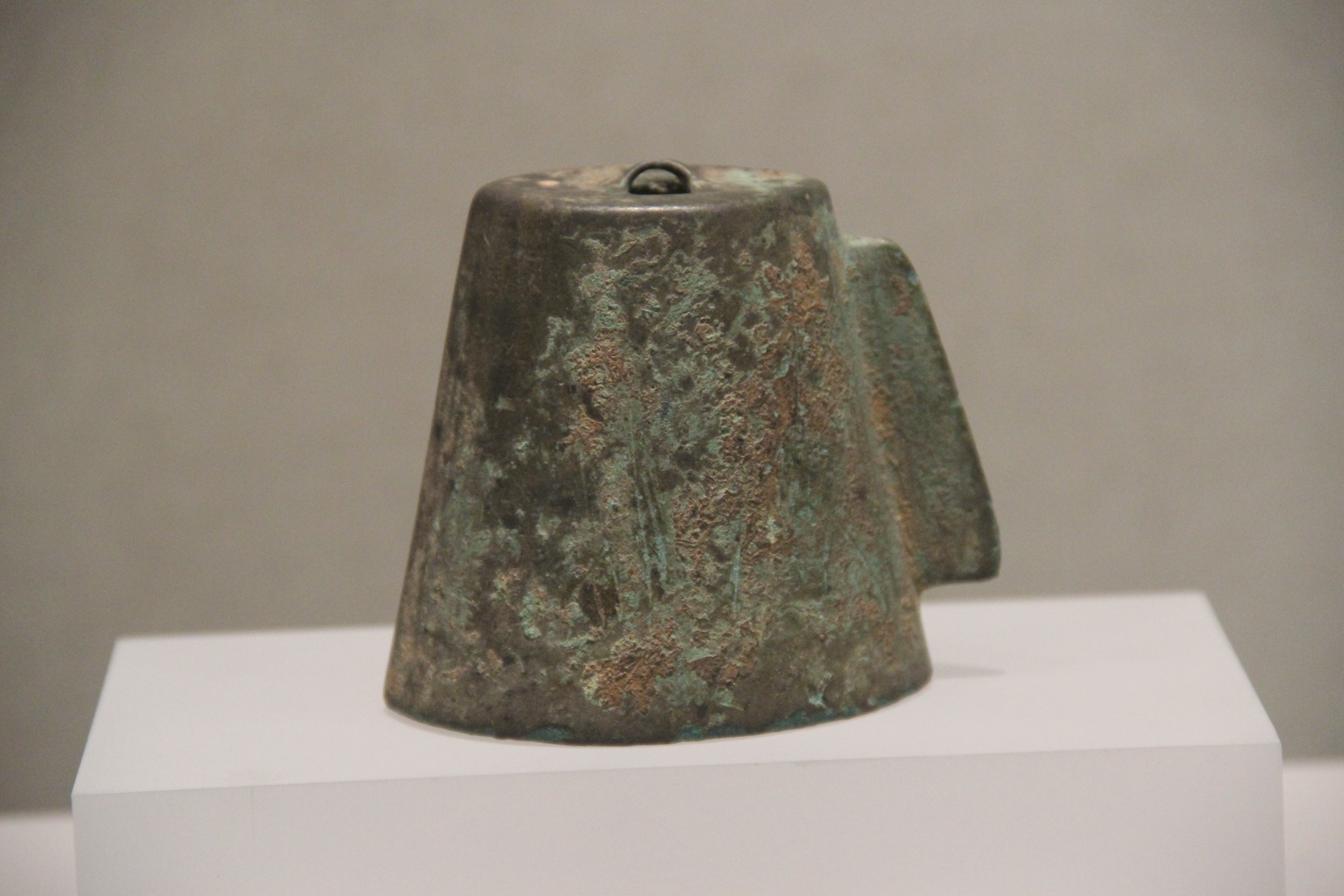
An Erlitou culture bronze ling

Ling (Chinese: 鈴), also known as clapper-bells, are a form of bell found in Neolithic and Bronze Age archaeological sites in China. They consist of a hollow bell body and a clapper dangled inside, which produces sound as it strikes the internal rim of the bell. Initially made from ceramic by the Yangshao culture (c. 5000 – c. 3000 BCE) and neighboring cultures in northern China, copper ling were produced by the end of the Longshan culture, with one example recovered from the site of Taosi in Shanxi. Both ceramic and bronze ling have been found at the Bronze Age site of Erlitou, where they were used as a grave good. Although relatively scarce from around 1500 to 1200 BCE, they reemerge during the Late Shang (1250–1046). Late Shang bronze ling are commonly found around the necks of animals buried as death attendants, especially dogs, although some examples have been found attached to elephants, cows, and a monkey. By the end of the Late Shang and the beginning of the Western Zhou, they were commonly incorporated into bronze ritual vessels.

== Description ==
Ling (Chinese: 鈴), also known as xuanling (懸鈴; 'hanging bells') or sheling (舌鈴; 'tongue-bells') in Chinese or clapper-bells in English, are a form of early Chinese bell found in Neolithic and Bronze Age sites. A ling consists of a hollow bell body and a clapper which is hung within. It produces sound when the clapper strikes the internal rim of the bell. Initially made of ceramic, they were later cast in copper and (most commonly) bronze. Metal ling have been divided into three types according to their shape. Type A, the oldest form, have hanging holes cast into the top of the bells. Type B bells have the clapper tied directly to an arc used for suspending the bells, while Type C have the clappers suspended from a loop cast inside the bell. Clappers could be made from organic materials such as wood, shell, or bone, metal such as bronze and lead, or minerals such as quartz, jade, and nephrite.

== History ==
The earliest known ling are small ceramic bells dating to the Yangshao culture (c. 5000 – c. 3000 BCE). These generally have a flat top, with one, two, or four holes for suspending the clapper within. Emerging around 4500 BCE, these early bells became widespread across the North China Plain. By the time of the Longshan culture (3000–1900 BCE), they had spread across eastern China, and were adopted by the Shijiahe culture of the central Yangtze and the Laohushan culture of Inner Mongolia. One ceramic ling with a fanged face motif was recovered from the Shijiahe site (2500–2000 BCE) in central Hubei in 1956; it is similar in shape to bronze ling from the later Erlitou culture, but shows regional symbolism which likely has religious meaning.

At the Longshan site of Taosi in southern Shanxi, seven or eight ceramic ling and one ling cast in copper have been recovered. The copper bell, cast from arsenical copper, is only 2.15 centimetres (0.85 in) high. It was found as a grave good in an otherwise unfurnished grave. This unusual burial has led archaeologists to theorize that the tomb's occupant was either a religious practitioner who used the bell in ceremonies (but who died without heirs being able to provide offerings), or that he was involved in the manufacture of the bells. The ceramic bells from the site are similar in size and shape, all having flat tops with two holes; they are similar in form to another Longshan ling found at Xinmi in Henan, suggesting a shared tradition of ceramic bells across the region. The clappers were likely made from organic material, as none survive in the ceramic bells from Taosi.

Six bronze-cast ling have been found in tombs at Erlitou, the type site of the Erlitou culture (1900–1500). These are cast using the piece-mold technique in tin bronze, with small amounts of added lead. They are much larger than the bells at Taosi, ranging from 7–9.3 cm (2.8–3.7 in) in height. The tops of the bells are flat, with one or two holes. A bridge across the holes was added to the design, to allow for separate strings to be used to suspend the clapper and hang the bell itself. The bells are flanged on one side, marking where the two molds used to create the bells were joined; this is a precursor to similar flanges which were added to ritual bronzes. Two ceramic ling have also been recovered from Erlitou; these postdate the bronze examples from the site, and so were likely a later derivation. Only a scant few ling from the Erlitou culture have been found outside the Erlitou site itself. Two were recovered from the site of Feixixian Dadunzi (肥西縣大敦孜) and Sanguanmiao (三官廟) in Feixi County, Anhui.

Very few ling date to between roughly 1500 to 1200, the period between the Erlitou culture and the emergence of the Late Shang. Only one ling has been found from Erligang culture (1600–1400) sites, namely as a grave good from a 14th-century tomb in the Yanshi Shang City. Although no ling have been recovered from the Zhengzhou Shang City, two mold pieces for casting the bells have been recovered from the ruins of a bronze foundry at the site. Two more bronze ling were found laid between the two occupants of a tomb at the site of Taixi in Gaocheng, Hebei.

Ling once again become common in the archaeological record during the Late Shang (1250–1046), with 350 examples recovered from the Yinxu site. They were no longer found by themselves as grave goods. Rather, the vast majority (around 90%) are found around the necks of dogs who were interred in tombs as death attendants. Ling often carry upside-down taotie motifs, possibly indicating a ritual role for guiding spirits through the underworld. The bells have also been found buried alongside elephants, cows, and a monkey. In one extant human burial from Yinxu, a ling was found close to the occupant's wrist. Ling are also found in sacrificial pits, which were often made in conjunction with a burial.

The use of ling continued during the Western Zhou (1046–771). Beginning in northern China during the Late Shang, some ling were suspended from the base of bronze ritual vessels, such as gu goblets, zun wine-vessels, and dou food-serving vessels. One Shang or Western Zhou zu, a bronze sacrificial altar, had two ling suspended from each end of the stand. The incorporation of the bells into the vessels may indicate that they were intended as a means to communicate with ancestral spirits, possibly to alert them of offerings.

== See also ==
- Bianzhong
