= Erlitou Site Museum of the Xia Capital =

Coordinates: 34.6832°N 112.6887°E

- 二里头夏都遗址博物馆
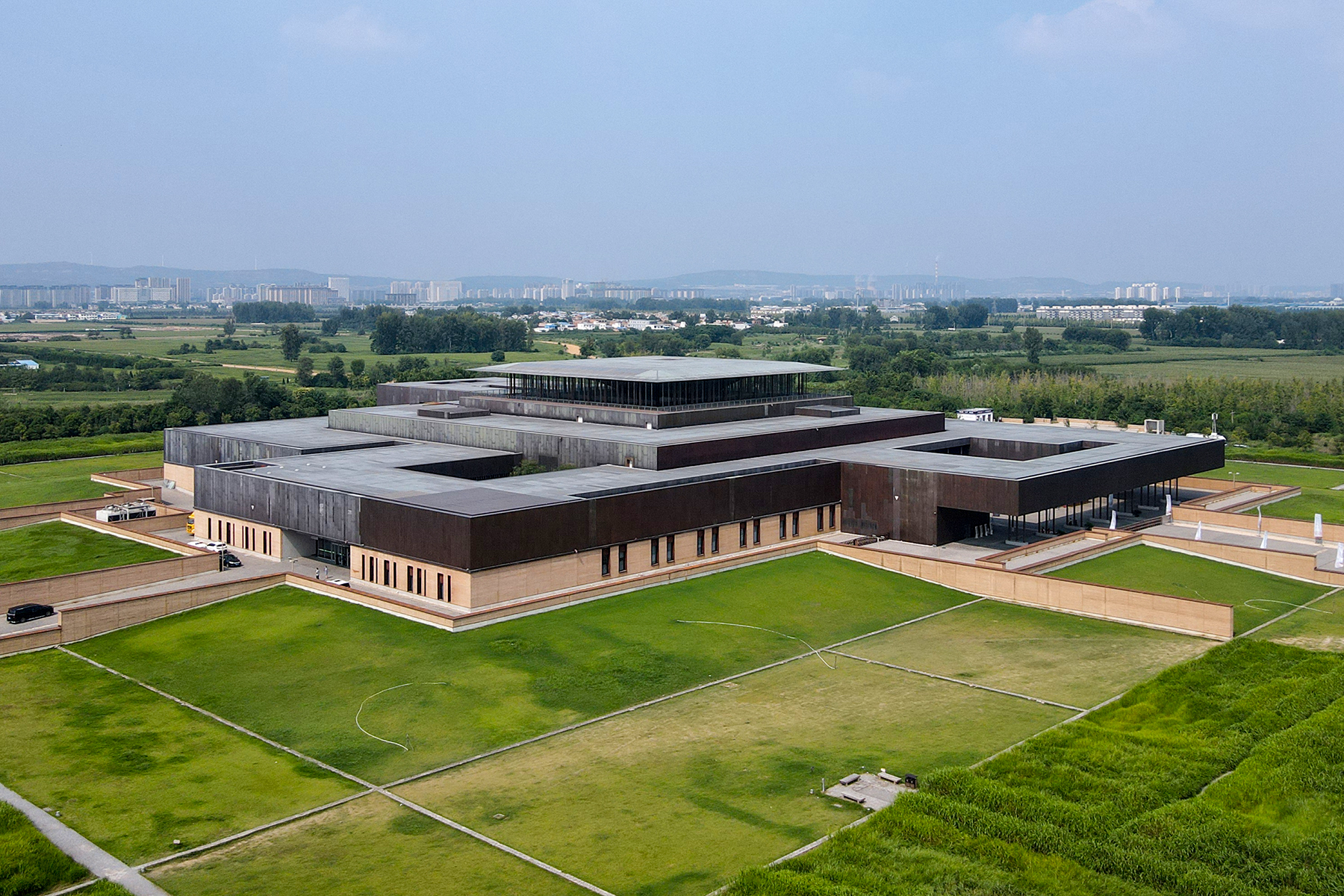
- Location: Sijiaolou village, Luoyang, Henan, China
- Type: historical museum

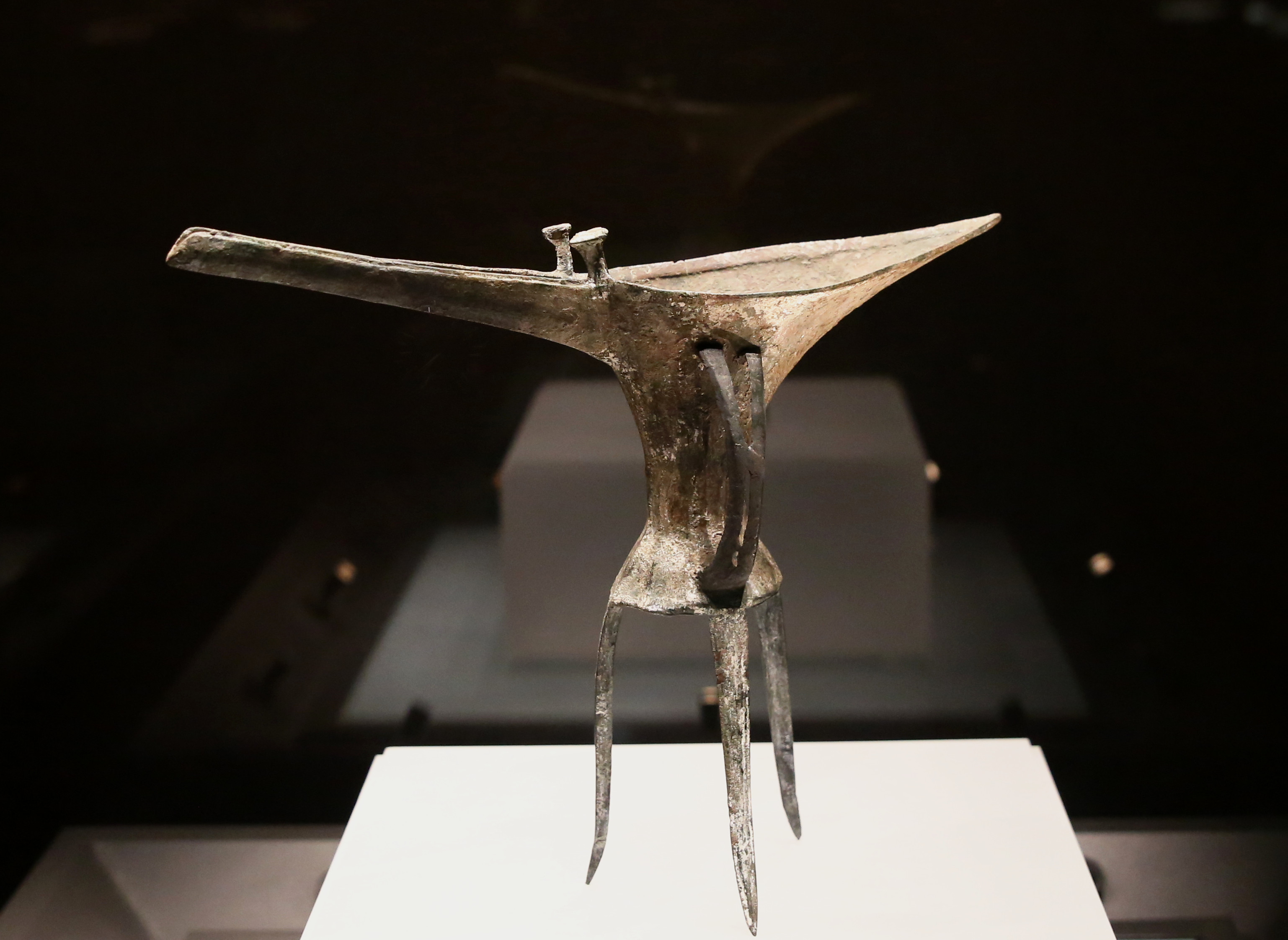
Bronze jue goblet originally displayed in the Luoyang Museum

Erlitou Site Museum of the Xia Capital is a museum that mainly displays the archaeological artefacts of the Erlitou culture, a Chinese Bronze Age culture that Chinese researchers believe to be the capital of the quasi-historical Xia dynasty. The museum is located in Sijiaolou village of Yanshi District, Luoyang City, Henan Province, about 300 meters away from the Erlitou Ruins Reserve in the north, and south of the Gucheng Expressway. The museum is co-built and managed by the Luoyang Municipal Government and the Chinese Academy of Social Sciences Institute of Archaeology.

== History ==
For many years after the excavation work was carried out in 1959, the Erlitou site did not have adequate facilities for the storage, study, safekeeping, and display of unearthed relics. The construction of a museum at the site had been on the agenda many times, and the plan for the museum was finalized in February 2017. Groundbreaking at the site was held on June 11, 2017, and construction officially started on September 2. The main structure was completed in October 2018. The opening ceremony was held on October 19, 2019, and the museum became open to the public from the next day onward free of charge. On the first day of the opening, 38,000 visitors were received throughout the day. By October 27, it had received over 110,000 visitors.

== Layout ==
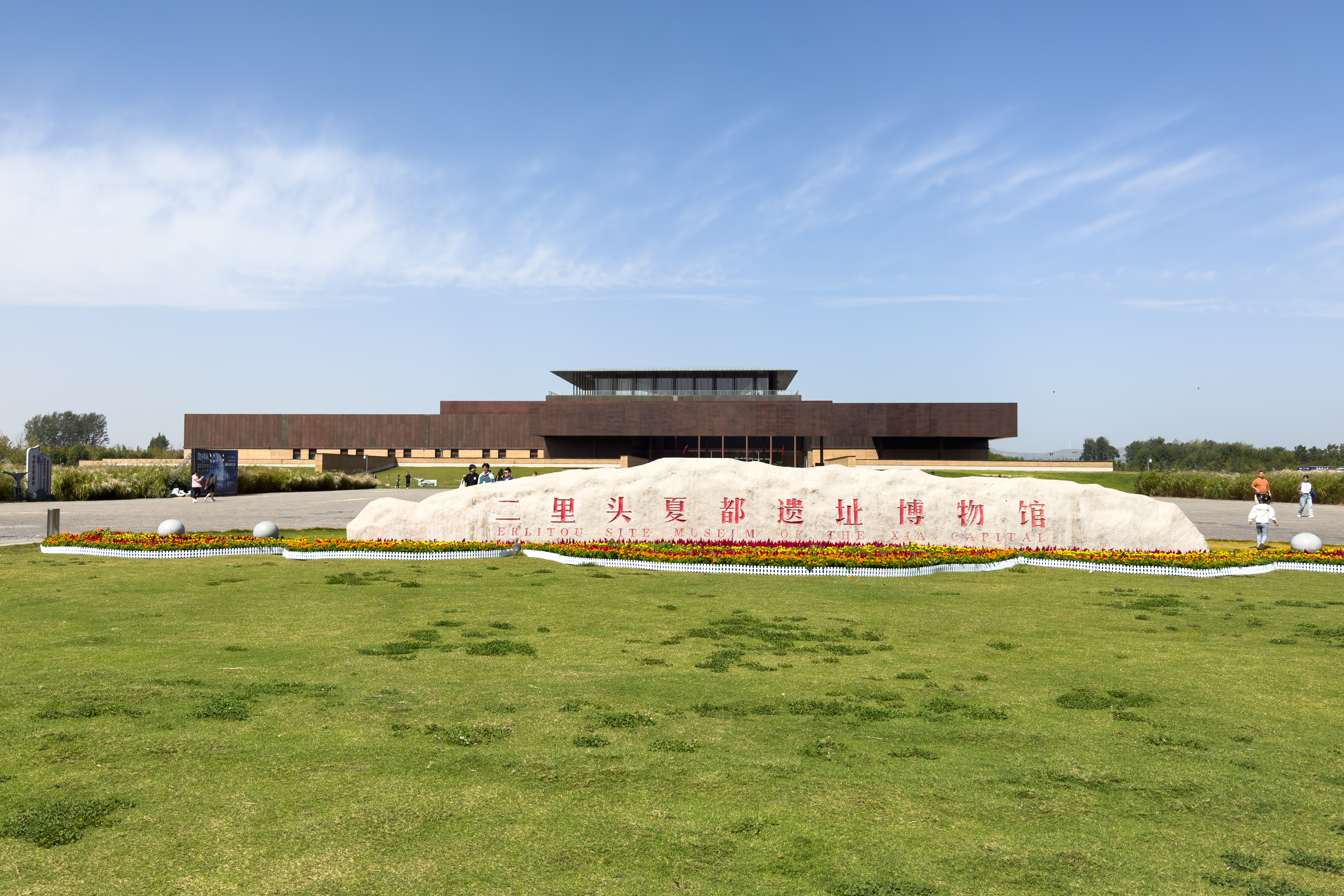
Main entrance of the museum

The museum covers an area of about 246 mu, with a total building area of 31,781 square meters, including four parts: public area, business area, administrative area and early China research center, the whole is a steel frame structure with a total height of 22.9 meters. The museum building was designed by the team of Professor Li Li of Tongji University. The museum building was designed by the team of Prof. Li Li from Tongji University. The museum building is largely decorated with rammed earth and purple copper. The building that extends around the museum and the decorative surface material of the first floor of the museum's periphery are both made of rammed earth, with a total of 4,000 cubic meters of rammed earth used. On top of the rammed earth decoration on the first floor, the interior and exterior facades and the roof of the second floor of the museum are decorated with old bronze decorative panels, with a total area of more than 30,000 square meters. There are 22,983 copper panels on the interior and exterior facades of the second floor of the museum and 4,659 panels on the roof. The museum has five permanent buildings. The museum has five permanent exhibition halls, the first, second and third halls are on the first floor, the fourth and fifth halls are on the second floor, and there are also two temporary exhibition halls on the second floor.

== Name ==
The foundation stone of the museum was laid on June 11, 2017, under the name “Erlitou Site Museum”. Although the National Cultural Heritage Administration recommended that the name of the site museum should not include “Xia Capital” in its approval in April 2017, the museum was renamed “Erlitou Site Museum of the Xia Capital” by the Luoyang Municipal Government in July 2019.

Due to the lack of supporting written materials at the time, archaeologists are unable to confirm whether Erlitou was the Xia capital or the Shang capital, and can only confirm that it was the remains of a wide-area royal state. Xu Hong (许宏), a researcher at the Institute of Archaeology of the Chinese Academy of Social Sciences and the third-generation leader of the Erlitou Archaeological Task Force, believes that Erlitou is most likely to be the Xia capital, but it would be controversial to definitively state that Erlitou was the Xia capital as the official name of the museum.
