= Jia (vessel) =

- Chinese: 斝
Transcriptions
Standard Mandarin
- Hanyu Pinyin: jiǎ
- Wade–Giles: chia^{3}
Middle Chinese
- Middle Chinese: kˠaX
Old Chinese
- Zhengzhang: *kraːʔ

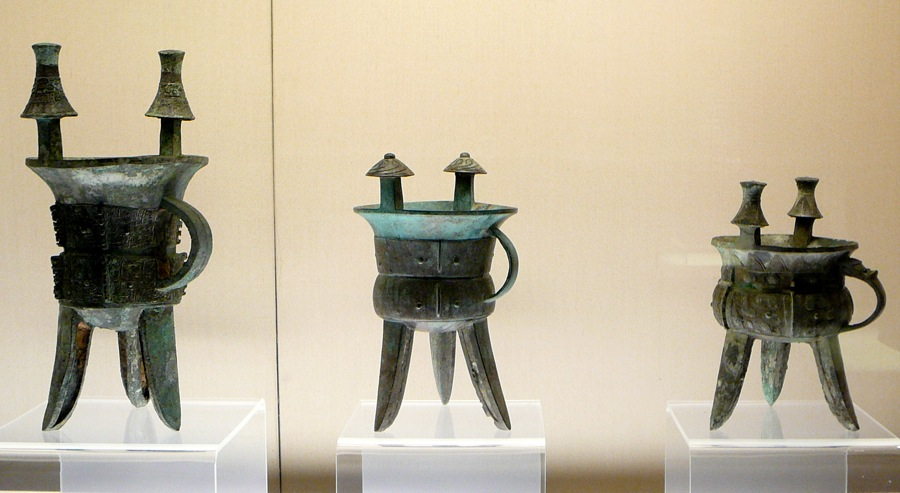
Three examples of the Jia vessel form from the 14th century BCE

A jia is a ritual vessel type found in both pottery and bronze forms; it was used to hold libations of wine for the veneration of ancestors. It was made either with four legs or in the form of a tripod and included two pillar-like protrusions on the rim that were possibly used to suspend the vessel over heat. The earliest evidence of the Jia vessel type appears during the Neolithic Period (c. 5000–2000 BCE). It was a prominent form during the Shang and early Western Zhou dynasties, but had disappeared by the mid-Western Zhou.

== Symbolism ==
The vessels had a ceremonial function. They were decorated with varying geometric designs and zoomorphic motifs, possibly symbolizing varying religious beliefs. There are several theories as to the origin and meaning of the symbolic iconography. Early Chinese scholars extended their traditional beliefs as regarded the symbolic meanings of the designs and motifs. They believed them to have a religious, cosmic, or mythical function. The Western historian Max Loehr has argued that the designs and motifs are ornamental and have no inherent symbolic meaning. There are no extant texts or sources contemporary with the creation of the Shang bronzes that offer descriptions or explanations of the symbolic meanings of the Jia vessels.

== Function ==
The Jia bronze type functioned as a wine vessel. The bronze vessels were used at feasts as drinking vessels; they were exhibited in ancestral halls and temples, and most prominently buried in tombs for use in the afterlife. These bronze vessels were not for everyday use, as the ancients typically used lacquerware or earthenware for eating and drinking. The Shang were practitioners of a form of ancestor worship, which incorporated ritual sacrifices. They would make their offerings based on a calendar of ritual sacrifices. The sacrifices would include the presentation of food and drink, depending on the vessel type. The bronze vessels were used to prepare, and or present these offerings.

== Décor ==
When it comes to the décor of the jia vessel, simple designs are most common. The lack of complex design is due to the jia vessel being one of the oldest vessel forms. As time progressed, vessel décor got more elaborate. While one simple band of décor was prevalent in early Shang times, towards the middle and late Shang periods more than one band of décor was more common. As the Zhou period began it was not unlikely to see a jia covered in ornamentation. The vessel shape changed to accommodate the change in decoration, and vice versa. When more elaborate designs are seen it is normally the taotie motif, or mask design. The taotie motif shows two dragon-like figures in profile, that together to form the taotie mask. Whorl circles were also a common decoration on the jia vessel. The décor on the jia can be classified by Max Loehr's five styles of Anyang bronzes. Style I is classified by thin thread relief designs, they are described as being light and airy and consist of simple forms. Style II uses a thicker ribbon relief. It has incised ornaments and harsh and heavy forms. Style III has more of a curvilinear design where only the eyes of the figures protrude and uniform like patterns appear. In style IV the decoration becomes separate from the background, which normally is made of the thunder pattern. The motifs and pattern are flush with the surface of the vessel. Style V vessels have decoration in a very high relief.

== Vessel form ==
The form of the jia changed slightly through different cultural periods. The most common form consisted of two parts, a skirt and an upper section that flares out at the top. This form was developed based on older versions of the jia that which had hollow conical legs that opened to the lower bowl section of the vessel. These hollow legs were replaced by small slits in the early Anyang period, this allowed for bracing the core against the outer parts of the mold. Another variation on the shape of the jia is a rounded bottom and an almost spherical body. A jia with a flat bottom and no skirt has also been found and dated to a pre-Anyang time. After the Erligang phase the skirt was made less obvious and the silhouette appeared almost vertical.

== Inscriptions ==
Inscriptions on jia vessels are typically found on the handles or pillars. Larger inscriptions are found on the belly of the vessel. Only a small percentage of jia vessel types have been discovered with inscriptions. The vessel known as the Yayi jia, held in the Asian Art Museum of San Francisco, contains an inscription on the bottom portion of the vessel. The Yayi jia's inscription depicts the symbolic characterization of a man, and on top of his head lay a cross-shaped symbol. This vessel gets its name from the modern reading of this symbol: 亞矣. The inscription Yayi appears frequently in late Shang bronzes; it is possibly a clan identification symbol. The jia vessel from the Saint Louis Art Museum provides further textual insights into the function of these vessels. There are two characters located under the handle of the vessel. Max Loehr states that the two characters are qiu Yi, "fermented liquor, Yi." Loehr further states that when read together it appears to mean, "for libations for (father or ancestor) Yi."

== Historical developments ==
=== Erlitou culture (first half of the second millennium BCE) ===
The origins of China's Bronze Age still remain unclear. Chinese historical writing suggests Xia was the first dynasty, preceding Shang, but no archaeological site has been conclusively linked to the Xia dynasty. The Erlitou site shows Shang culture at its primitive stage, retaining apparently Neolithic features.

In 1986, four bronze jia vessels were found from Erlitou in Yanshi, Henan Province. This site is approximately dated to ca.1860–1545 BCE based on calibrated carbon 14. The vessels were cast by the piece mold method. One of them has decorations featuring three bands of continuous small circles around the waist. This motif appears on other vessels from Yanshi.

=== Zhengzhou phase – Erligang period (mid-second millennium BCE) ===
The Zhengzhou Shang city was discovered 62 miles (100 km) east of Erlitou. Objects unearthed from the site of Panlongcheng represent the Zhengzhou phase. Stylistic similarities are seen from the two sites although Panlongcheng was not a very important city by then. Bronze vessels shared uniform styles across regions while later during Anyang phase outlying areas were diverging from the artistic tradition of central North China.

Max Loehr suggests that bronze vessels during the Zhengzhou phase consist of three styles in their decor: style I is featured by thread relief which is incised in the model not on the mold; in style II, thread relief is replaced by ribbon relief which is carved in the mold not in the model; style III combines styles I and II with thunder patterns, quill patterns, and more bands of designs which are carved on the model not the mold. Jia vessels fit well into such categorization. The decorations develop from thread relief to ribbon relief with one or more vivid taotie mask according to how many sections they have.

=== Regional bronze-using cultures (15th–11th centuries BCE) ===
The Shang culture expanded early and vastly. So did bronze-casting technology, laying the basis for provincial bronze-using cultures distinguishable from the metropolitan style. Systematic excavations of Shang-era sites both within and outside the Shang cultural sphere have only recently begun. Bronze and jade objects are among the more frequent discoveries. Some are imports from workshops in metropolitan areas or faithful copies of metropolitan pieces. Others show radically different tastes. Areas that had strong ties with the court would have kept in better touch with the style of metropolitan fashions.

=== High Yinxu phase – Anyang period (about 1300 – about 1030 BCE) ===
An upsurge of activity at the Anyang site is evident during the long reign of Wu Ding, fourth of the Anyang kings. A rich corpus of oracle inscriptions from Wu Ding's court attests frequent sacrificial observances, during which the bronze vessels would have been essential.

One name that occurs especially often in early oracle bone inscriptions is that of Fu Hao. She was a royal consort, diviner, and military general. Style IV and Style V of Anyang phase are seen in the two pairs of jia vessels in Fu Hao's tomb. In Style IV, images are raised in vivid relief. In Style V, images are raised up in high relief from the more flat thunder patterns in the background. Moreover, these jia vessels are square-sectioned, one of the distinguishing features of the Anyang Period. This fashion immediately faded away in Zhou. The square forms in these jia vessels show a new aesthetic flavour.

=== Ritual revolution ===
During the middle to late Western Zhou period, changes in the ritual vessel types began to arise. The production of wine vessel types from the Shang dynasty, (jue 爵, hu 觚, jia 斝, fangyi, and gong vessel types), began to decline and would eventually disappear. The hu 壺 was created at this time and would become the only vessel type used for wine rituals. The change in vessel types from those of high quality and variety, to mass and uniformity, suggests a movement away from the ritual function of the vessels to a symbol of the owners status.

== Important examples ==
=== Neolithic period to Erlitou cultural period ===
Pottery Jia

- Period: late Neolithic period, early Erlitou cultural period
- Date: c. 2000–1600 BCE
- Description: From Erlitou, Henan Province

Bronze Jia

H. 31 cm

- Period: early Shang dynasty, Erlitou cultural period
- Date: c. 1600–1400 BCE
- Description: From Yanshi, Henan Province

=== Early to middle Shang dynasty ===
Bronze Jia

H. 21.9 cm x W. 14.5 cm x D. 16.0 cm

- Period: early Shang dynasty
- Date: c. 1400-1300 BCE
- Description: The décor of this jia is within a single narrow register around the waist of the vessel. The style of decoration has been developed beyond the thread-relief on the preceding examples, and the taotie formed by two kui dragons is now franked in raised ribbon-like bands. This style loses the delicacy of thread relief but represents the Shang progression toward the distinction of figure and ground.

Bronze Jia

H. 33 cm x W. 20.3 cm x D. 19.1 cm

- Period: middle Shang dynasty
- Date: c. 1500-1250 BCE
- Description: This is a beaker-shaped container with three hollow, pointed legs. It has a plain bow handle and two capped uprights. This jia is one of the most elegant of the middle Shang period. The decoration, mainly in thread relief, consists of two bands both framed by small continuous circles – typical for the period. The lower band is divided into six panels by thick and shallow ridges. Every other ridge forms the central part of a taotie face with two bulging eyes. This mask is formed by the dissolved bodies of two confronted dragons in profile. The upper band above the constricted waist is a smaller, narrower and eye-less version of the same theme. The short uprights spring upwards from the rim of the flowing mouth. Set at right angles with the handle, they occupy the segment of the rim the farther away from this handle, which is another characteristic of the middle Shang style. The nipple-like caps arc incised with whorl-circles, the only dynamic elements in an otherwise frontal and static decoration.

=== Late Shang dynasty: Anyang phase ===
Bronze Jia

H. 29.3 cm

- Period: late Shang dynasty
- Date: c. 1600–1046 BCE
- Description: found in a Yin tomb at Dasikongcun, Anyang

Bronze Fangjia

H. 67 cm

- Period: late Shang dynasty
- Date: c. 1600–1046 BCE
- Description: Weighing 42.25 lb (18.45 kg), this is part of three large fangjia found in Fu Hao's tomb. The three jia bear the names of other lineages. It may be included in the gift set of jue and gu from the Si Tu Mu, Ya Qi, and Shu Quan lineages. The formal innovations of this vessel embody a body and tall neck in square-section with relief decoration and relatively thick flanges.

Bronze Hou Mu Jia addressed to the queen (Hou) mother (Mu)

H. 66.5 cm

- Period: late Shang dynasty
- Date: c. 1600–1046 BCE
- Description: Found in the tomb of Fu Hao in Yinxu, Henan province, this jia weighs 20.5 kg. The uprising handle is in the shape of umbrellas. The body is divided into two parts with a bigger lower part. The bottom is flat. The handle on the side bears the design of an animal head. The legs, measuring 28 cm, are in three-edged awl shape. Twelve triangular patterns are around the mouth rim, which measures 30.7 cm. Whirling circles are on top of the uprising handles. Three taotie masks are on each section of the body. On the upper section, are inward curling patterns while on the lower section are outward curls. On the side of one of the taotie masks are two kui dragons. Kui dragons and banana leaf patterns are on the legs.

Bronze Jia

H. 29.5 cm

- Period: late Shang dynasty: early Anyang phase
- Date: c. 1200–1100 BCE
- Description: This jia has three blade-form legs. The low reliefs are conformed in a wide band with three taotie masks positioned between the supports. They have rounded eyes and a slender dividing flange. Beneath is a narrow band of stylized dragons. It has a pair of rectangular handles with large conical caps cast with comma motifs.

Bronze Yayi Jia

H. 75.3 cm x W. 38.1 cm x D. 31.8 cm

- Period: late Shang dynasty: Anyang period
- Date: c. 1300–1050 BCE
- Description: Most jia vessels were used for pouring wine. This vessel is too tall and heavy, and its center of gravity is too high. Maybe it was more for display than for actual use. The decoration consists of taotie masks and small kui dragons against a spiral background of thunder patterns (leiwen). The handle bears a horned beast with a bird in its mouth. This peculiar combination appears often on handles. This vessel was found near the late Shang capital at Anyang in Henan province. It is similar in size and decoration to a group of objects from the tomb of Fu Hao. The inscription cast in the bottom of the vessel represents a man with a cross-shaped symbol on top of his head. Now read "Yayi," this symbol appears in many late Shang bronzes and is probably a clan sign.

Bronze-lidded fangjia

H. 40.6 cm x W. 25.1 cm

- Period: late Shang dynasty: Anyang phase
- Date: c. 1200-1050 BCE
- Description: Boxy geometric shapes and compartmented designs reveal the continued use of fitted clay mold sections. New shapes emerged, like the wine container resembling addorsed owls.

Bronze Jia

H. 46.5 cm

- Period: Shang dynasty
- Description: This is a round-sectioned vessel from Bennanxian, Anhui province. Anhui province during the Shang dynasty was not part of the central plain area, and was considered to be a provincial region. This drinking vessel is very much like those in the metropolitan area, which shows a close connection and communication. The mouth measures 22.2 cm.

=== Western Zhou dynasty ===
Bronze Jia

H. 28.2 cm

- Period: late Shang dynasty or early Western Zhou dynasty
- Date: c. 1000-900 BCE
- Description: The body is heavily cast. It has three equal lobes on top of slim columnar legs. It is bordered with double bow-string bands. It has a three-character inscription in a rectangular panel cast on the body behind the handle.

Bronze Jia

H. 32.4 cm x W. 26.7 cm

- Period: Western Zhou dynasty
- Date: c. 1046–771 BCE
- Description: Part of the altar set at Metropolitan Museum of Art. This set was excavated in 1901 and later collected by Duanfang, a senior Manchu official. Eleven vessels are inscribed. The set was created around the time that Zhou conquered Shang, and clearly by different foundries; the set may represent the accumulated wealth of a family shrine.

=== Later period ===
Nephrite Jia

H. 25.4 cm x W. 4.0 cm x D. 15.2 cm

- Period: Later Qing dynasty, Republic period
- Date: c. 1900–1949
- Description: Making copies of old vessels in other materials became a trend in the early part of the twentieth century due to increasing amount of archaeological activity. Jade jia vessels were especially popular. This motif consists of abstracted dragons based on Western Zhou models. The thinly cut jade is caused by the influx of Mughal styles during Qianlong reign.

== Historical and cultural references ==
During the Ming and Qing periods, jia gradually became tea drinking vessels, as recorded in Dream of the Red Chamber.

- 第四十一回 "栊翠庵茶品梅花雪怡红院劫遇母蝗虫"有一节云:又见妙玉另拿出两只杯来。一个旁边有一耳，杯上镌着"𤫫瓟斝"三个隶字，后有一行小真字是"晋王恺珍玩"，又有"宋元丰五年四月眉山苏轼见于秘府"一行小字。妙玉便斟了一斝，递与宝钗。 In this chapter, the author writes about Miaoyu's collection of tea drinking vessels. Among which is a bottle-gourd jia with clerical script inscription "ban pao jia" on it.

Jade jia are frequently mentioned in poems and other literary works:

- 身在瑶台，笑斟玉斝，人生几见此佳景 。[清 孔尚任《桃花扇·草檄》] This describes how happy it is at a banquet by talking about the beautiful scenery around and pouring wine into the jade jia vessels. (The Peach Blossom Fan, Kong Shangren)
- 太庙初献，依开宝例，以玉斝、玉瓒，亚献以金斝，终献以瓢斝 。[《宋史·礼志一》]This records a ritual performed during the Song dynasty in the book History of Song in Twenty-Four Histories. Jade jia, gold jia, and jia made from gourds are used sequentially in the ritual.
