= Yi River (Henan) =

River in Henan, China

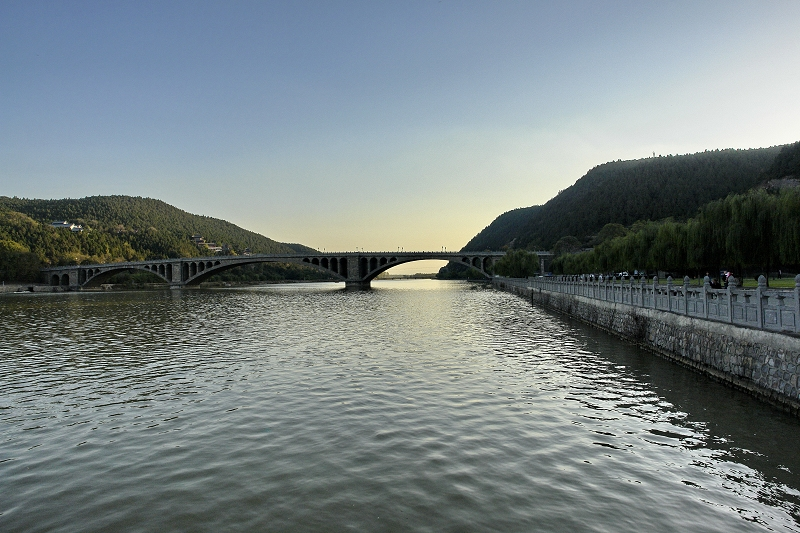
The Yi River near Longmenshan

The Yi River (Chinese: 伊河; pinyin: Yī Hé) is a tributary of the Luo River in the province of Henan, China.

The river rises in Luanchuan County, and then flows through the counties of Song and Yichuan before entering Luoyang city proper. It joins the Luo River at Yanshi.

The river's total length is 368 kilometres and it has a catchment basin of 6,100 square kilometres.

The Yi-Luo river basin is of major archaeological significance.
