= Laohushan culture =

Archaeological culture in China

- Geographical range: Ulanqab, Inner Mongolia, China
- Period: Bronze Age China
- Dates: c. 2700—2200 BC
- Type site: Laohushan
- Preceded by: Haisheng Bulang Culture (海生不浪文化)

Chinese name
- Traditional Chinese: 老虎山文化
- Simplified Chinese: 老虎山文化
Transcriptions
Standard Mandarin
- Hanyu Pinyin: lǎohǔshān wénhuà

The Laohushan culture was an early Bronze Age urban society that existed in Ulanqab, Inner Mongolia, China, from approximately 2700—2200 BC. The culture was named after the site discovered at Laohushan, Liangcheng Country.

== History ==
Around 2000 BC, the Hongshan people who had mastered stone wall construction moved westward and integrated with the Yangshao people. They cultivated a new civilization that was named Laohushan Culture, after the large and well-preserved Laohushan Site in today's Liangcheng county, Ulaanqab. It was marked by stone city settlements and a tripod cauldron with hollow legs.

== Discovery ==
Three Laohushan stone city settlements have been discovered in central and southern Inner Mongolia. They were all built in sunny and sheltered places in front of mountains with irregularly-shaped stone walls. These discoveries indicate that the Laohushan people probably used professional division of labor to produce pottery.

Common examples of Laohushan pottery include the jia (a wine warmer), unpainted sand-and-pottery jars, long-necked jars, straight wall vats, and small-mouthed urns. Archaeologists believe the jia and tripod cauldron were formed directly from bottles with small mouths and pointed bottoms.

== Influence ==
The Laohushan Culture had a great influence on other primitive civilizations that flourished in nearby areas, such as the Taosi site in Shanxi and the Lower Xiajiadian culture in Hebei.

== Features ==
The settlements are mostly located on the low mountains around the lake. There is a significant differentiation in the size of settlements, with an increase in settlements with an area of more than 100000 square meters. Yuanzigou, with an area of more than 300000 square meters, is the central settlement in the Daihai region. Some settlements have stone city walls, which fluctuate according to the terrain and have irregular shapes. Some have altars at higher elevations of their residences.

== See also ==
- Ulanqab
- Liangcheng Country
