= Luo River (Henan) =

Tributary of the Yellow River

Coordinates: 34.8379°N 113.07°E

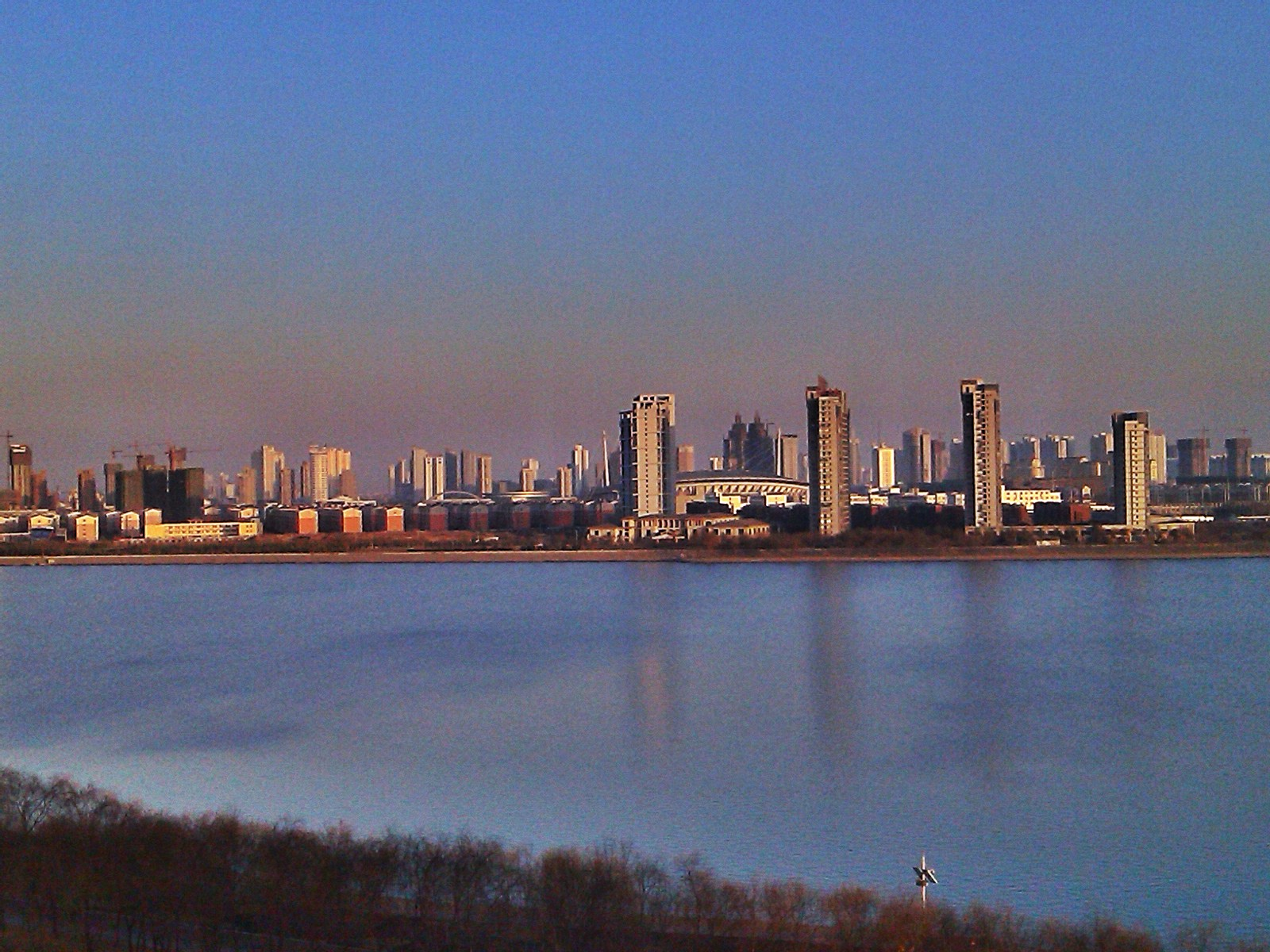
Luo River in Luoyang city

The Luo River (Chinese: 洛河; pinyin: Luò Hé) is a tributary of the Yellow River in China. It rises in the southeast flank of Mount Hua in Shaanxi province and flows east into Henan province, where it eventually joins the Yellow River at the city of Gongyi. The river's total length is 420 kilometres (260 mi).

Although not a major river by most standards, it flows through an area of great archaeological significance in the early history of China. Principal cities or prefectures located on the river include Lushi, Luoning, Yiyang, Luoyang, Yanshi, and Gongyi. The Luo's main tributary is the Yi River, which joins it at Yanshi, after which the river is called the Yiluo River.

== See also ==
- Lo Shu Square
- Peiligang culture
