= Max Loehr =

American art historian

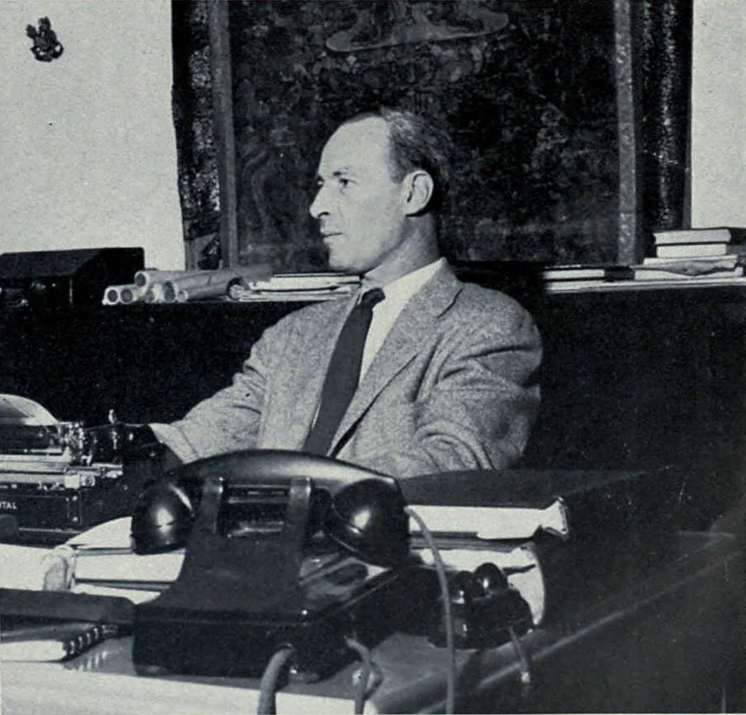
- Loehr at the University of Michigan, 1955
- Born: 4 December 1903; Chemnitz, Saxony, Germany
- Died: 16 September 1988 (aged 84); Nashua, New Hampshire, U.S.
- Education: Ludwig-Maximilians-Universität München (Ph.D.)
- Occupations: Professor, art historian

Max Loehr (4 December 1903 – 16 September 1988) was an art historian and professor of Chinese art at Harvard University from 1960 to 1974. As an authority on Chinese art, Loehr published eight books and numerous articles on ancient Chinese painting.

== Biography ==
Max Loehr was born in Chemnitz, Saxony, Germany, in 1903. He entered the Ludwig-Maximilians-Universität München in 1931, where he studied Far Eastern art and obtained his PhD in 1936. Then he worked at the Museum Five Continents in Munich on the Asian collections. In 1940, Loehr went to Beijing to study at the Sino-German Center for Research Promotion, later striving as director of the institute and as assistant professor at Tsinghua University. In 1949, he returned to his former post in Munich, and two years after that he moved to the United States to become a professor at the University of Michigan. In 1960, Loehr accepted the Abby Aldrich Rockefeller Chair position in East Asian Art at Harvard University, and took a post as curator of Oriental art at the Fogg Museum until his retirement in 1974.

Loehr died in 1988 in Nashua, New Hampshire.

== Selected works ==
=== Books ===
- Chinese Landscape Woodcuts: From an Imperial Commentary to the Tenth-Century Printed Edition of the Buddhist Canon (1968) Harvard University Press.
- Ritual Vessels of Bronze Age China (1974) New York: Asia Society Inc.
- Ancient Chinese Jades From the Grenville L WInthrop Collection in the Fogg Art Museum (1975), Fogg Art Museum/ Harvard University, Cambridge, Massachusetts
- The Great Painters of China (1980) Oxford: Phaidon Press.

=== Articles ===
- Germany's Contemporary Painters The XXth Century: Shanghai, volume 5, no. 1, July 1943, p. 58 available online at: https://web.archive.org/web/20110703164216/http://libweb.hawaii.edu/libdept/russian/XX/PDF/6-Volume5.pdf
