= Proto-celadon =

Form of ancient Chinese pottery

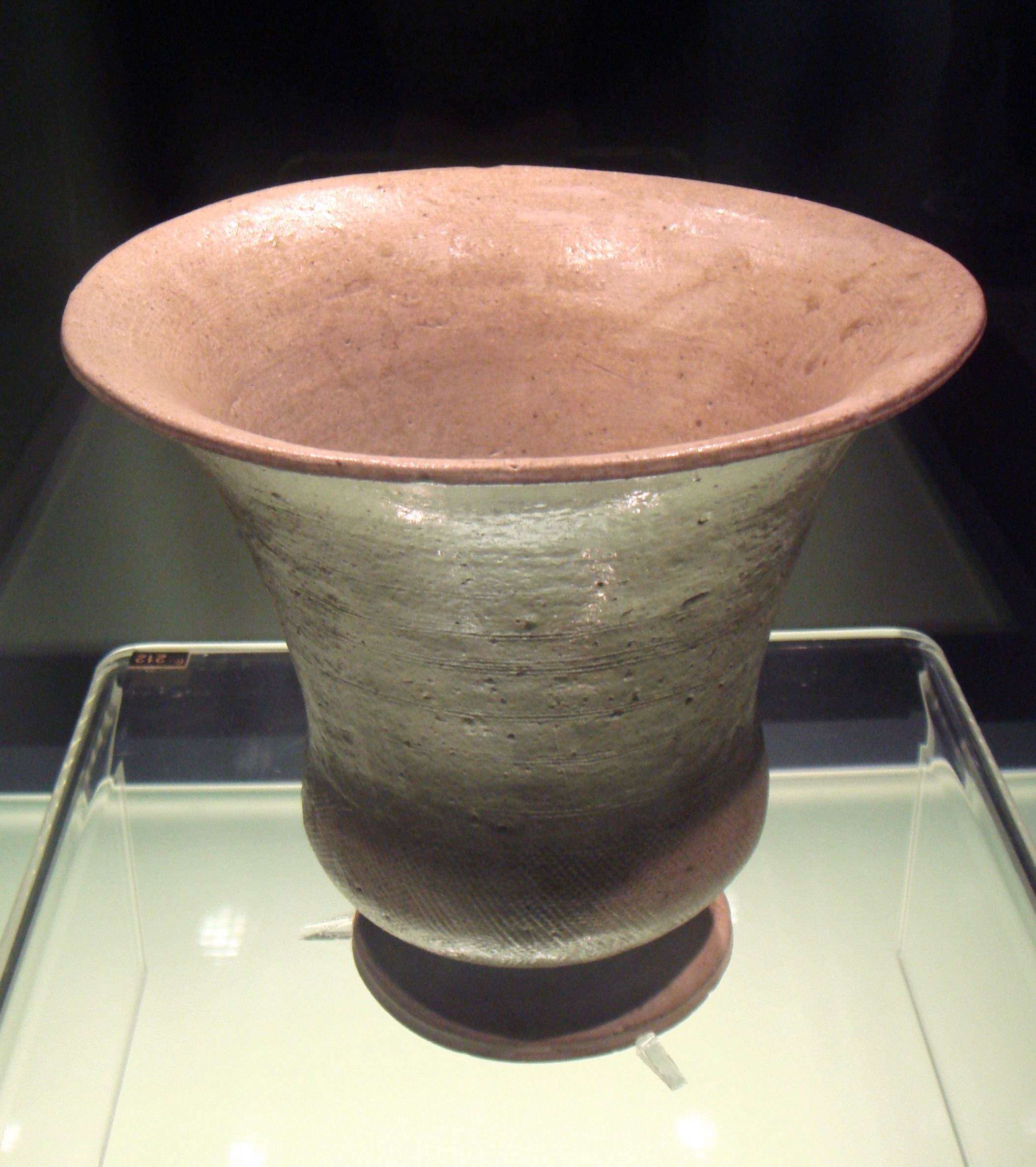
Proto-celadon Zun wine vessel, Shang period, 16–11th century BCE.

Proto-celadon (Chinese: 灰釉陶, also 原始青瓷) was a type of Chinese ceramic which developed during the Shang and Jin periods. It is often described as "proto-porcelain", and was usually glazed in light yellowish green.

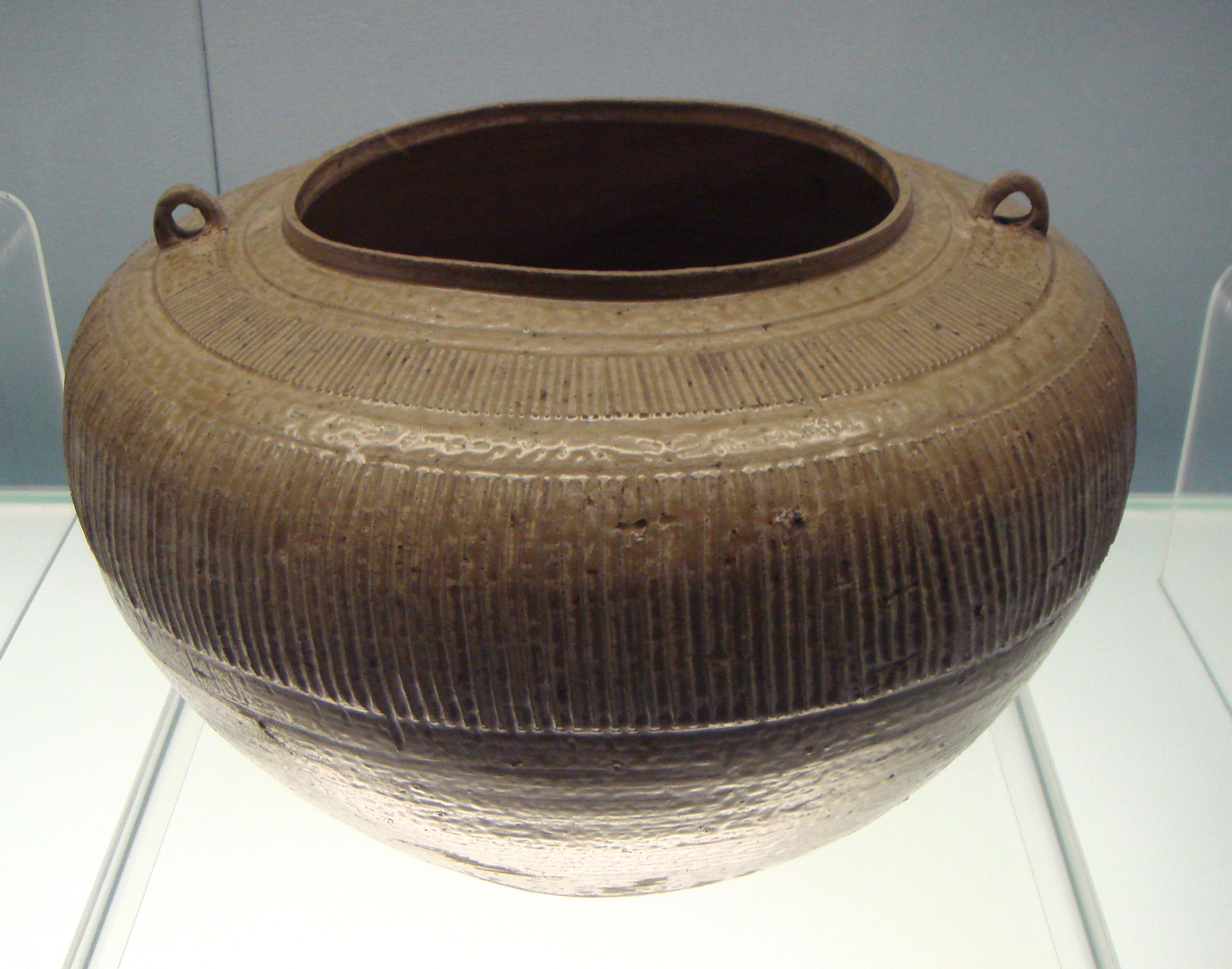
Proto-celadon jar with ears and vertical stripes, Warring States period, 475–211 BCE.

The body of proto-celadon was high-fired, the Chinese classification including porcelain, with an iron content below 3%. Firing temperature was around 1200 degrees Celsius. In Western terms the wares are stoneware. Surface treatment consisted of a lime glaze. The shapes manufactured in proto-celadon were similar to the objects manufactured in bronze.

Proto-celadon was mainly produced in the areas south of the Yangtze river. From the Han dynasty onward, production greatly improved in quantity and quality.

== Inception of true celadon ==
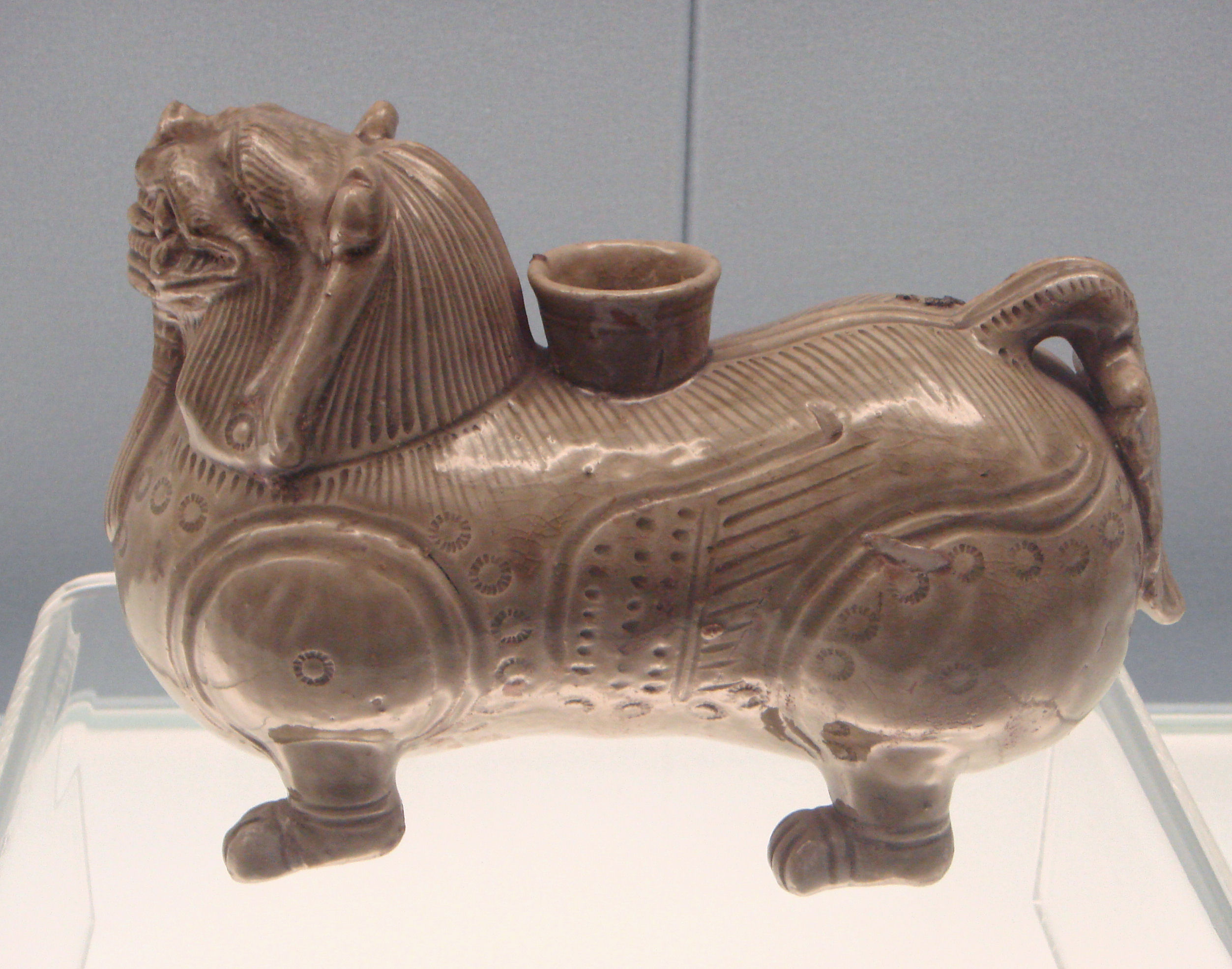
Celadon lion-shaped Bixie (辟邪), Western Jin period, 265–317 CE.

From the Eastern Han period, true celadon ware (成熟青瓷) started to appear, with production focused in Zhejiang province. Although still following the shapes and patterns of proto-celadon wares, these advances now represented the characteristics of porcelain, with refined clays and appropriate firing temperatures.

These advances were followed by those of Yue ware, and the blooming of celadon production from the period of the Song dynasty.

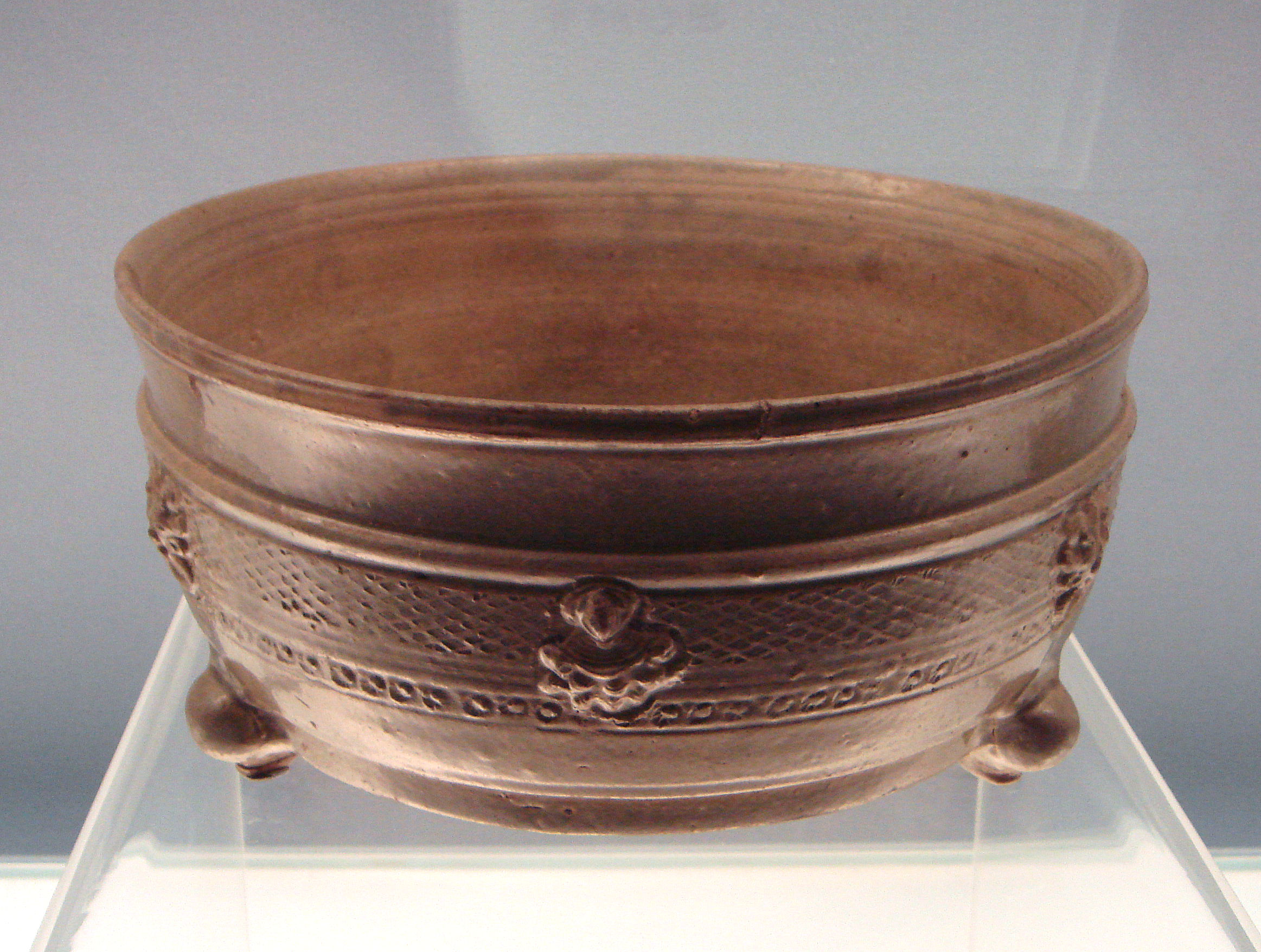
Celadon Lian bowl with Buddhist figures, Western Jin, 265–317 CE.

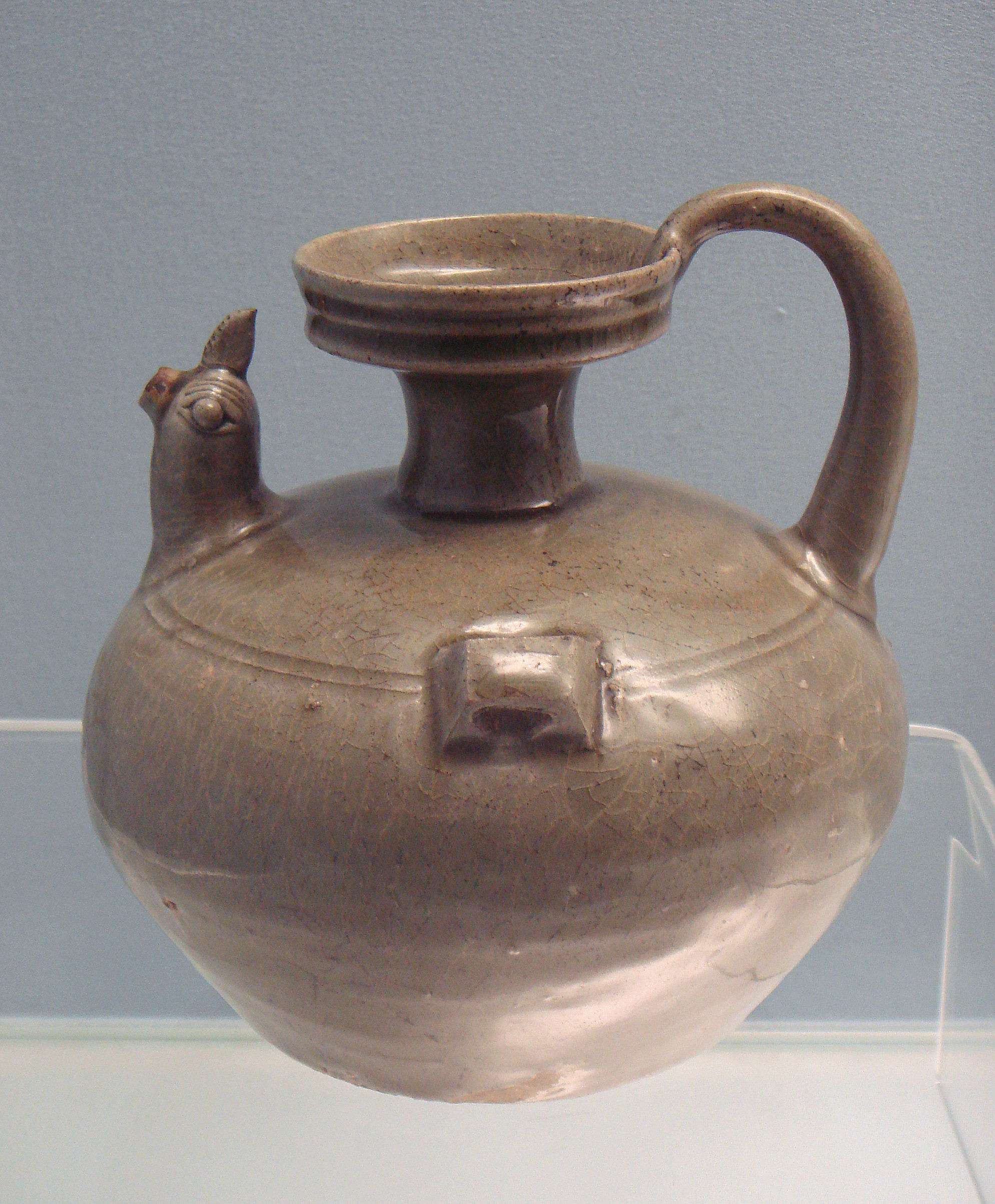
Celadon jar, Eastern Jin, 317–420 CE.

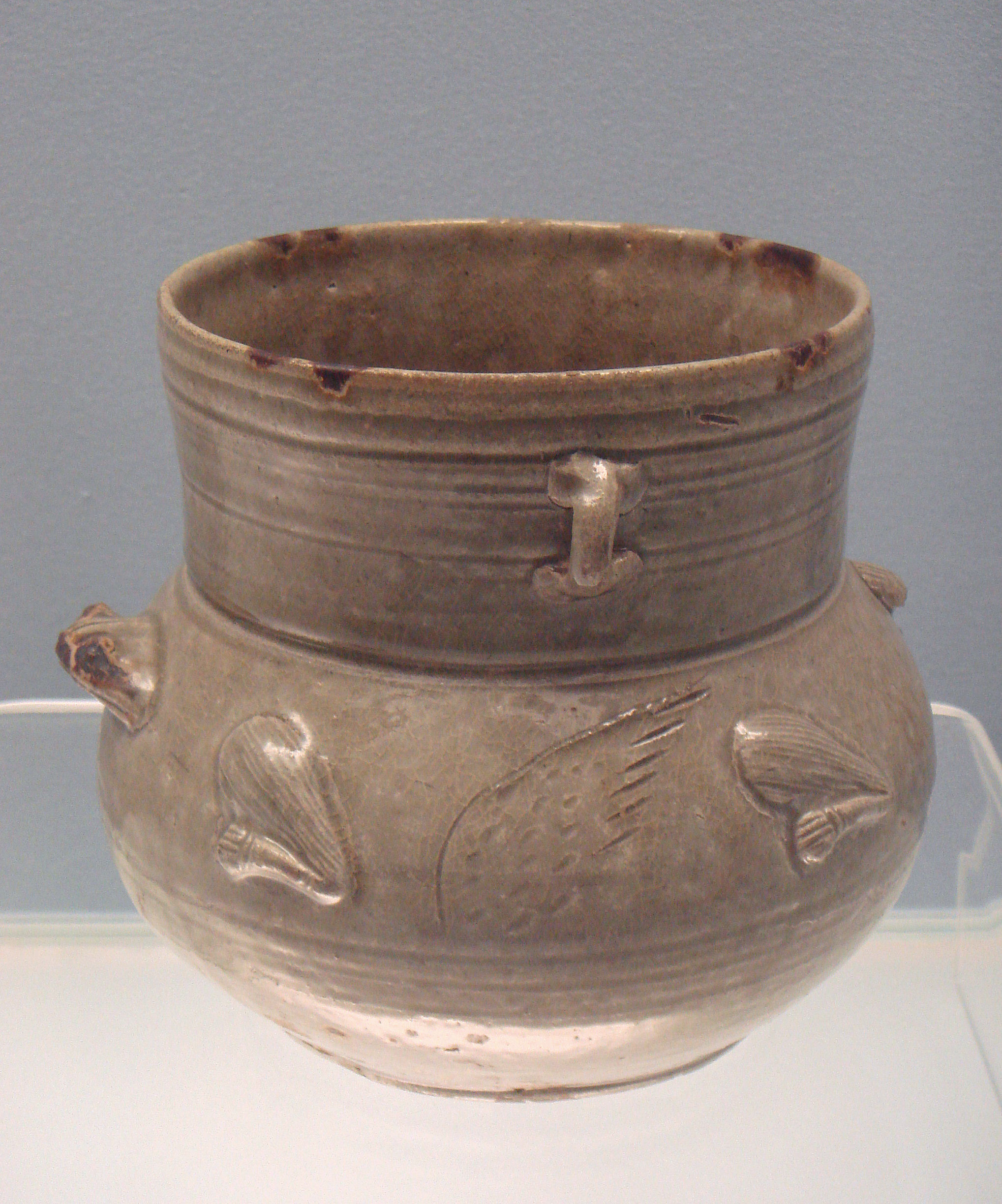
Celadon jar with brown spots, Eastern Jin, 317–420 CE.
