= Jue (vessel) =

Ancient Chinese ritual bronze vessel

- jue in oracle bone script
- Chinese: 爵
Transcriptions
Standard Mandarin
- Hanyu Pinyin: jué
- Wade–Giles: chüeh^{2}
Middle Chinese
- Middle Chinese: t͡sɨɐk̚
Old Chinese
- Zhengzhang: *ʔsewɢ

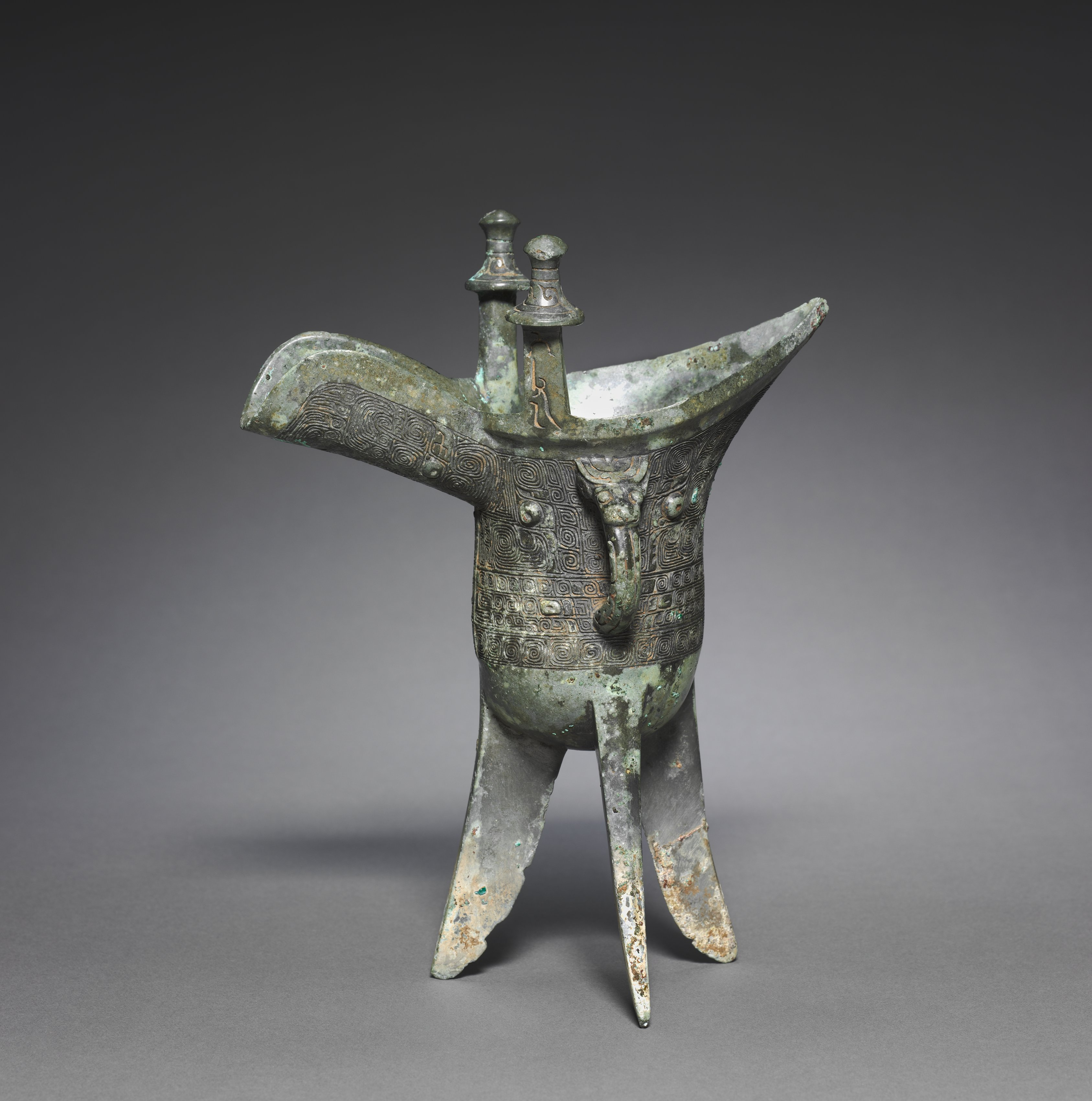
Jue of the late Shang dynasty (c. 1200 BC)

A jue (Chinese: 爵; Wade–Giles: chüeh) is a type of ancient Chinese ritual bronze vessel used to serve warm wine during ancestor-worship ceremonies. It takes the form of an ovoid body supported by three splayed triangular legs, with a long curved spout (流; liu) on one side and a counterbalancing flange (尾; wei) on the other. Many examples have one or two loop handles (鋬; pan) on the side and two column-shaped protuberances (柱; zhu) on the top of the vessel, which were probably used to enable the vessel to be lifted using leather straps. They are often ornately decorated with taotie decorations representing mythical beasts. They are in effect a small Chinese equivalent of the ewer. The name jue is not original, but derives from the Shuowen Jiezi, a dictionary of the 2nd century AD.

The vessel originated in Neolithic times as a pottery ware associated with the Longshan culture, between about 2500-2000 BC. During the Shang and Zhou dynasties of Bronze Age China, it became one of a number of designs of Chinese ritual bronzes. Pottery and lead copies continued to be made and used as grave goods or spirit utensils (mingqi). Most jue (like other Chinese bronzes) were created by casting molten metal in pottery moulds, but one jue appears to have been made using the much earlier method of hammering sheet metal that might have been introduced from western Asia, where bronze metallurgy is believed to have been developed 2,000 years before it appeared in China.

Jue were the most common type of vessel found in the tombs of elites during the Shang dynasty. Their ritual use is indicated by oracle bone inscriptions that suggest that they were used to heat and pour wine during oracular ceremonies in which the owner's ancestors and the Supreme Deity (上帝; Shangdi) were invoked. They were also used in temple ceremonies to mark particular festivals. Traces of soot have been found on the legs and bottoms of a few jue, indicating that some of them were placed directly into fires to heat their contents. However, this appears in only about 5% of the jue excavated in archeological sites, so should be viewed as an exception rather than a rule.

According to the later Zhou-era Book of Etiquette and Ceremonial, it was used in formal settings with a prescribed set of ritual actions. After being lifted from its bamboo hamper, it was to be rinsed, lifted with one hand, emptied, set down and put back in its hamper. The drinker would praise the wine while the host would decline to do so, out of modesty. Similar rituals were conducted with the (卮/巵/梔; zhi), another type of wine vessel. Analogous ceremonies are described in the Book of Rites, another Zhou text.
