= Yanshi, Luoyang =

District in Henan, China

Yanshi 偃师区
- District
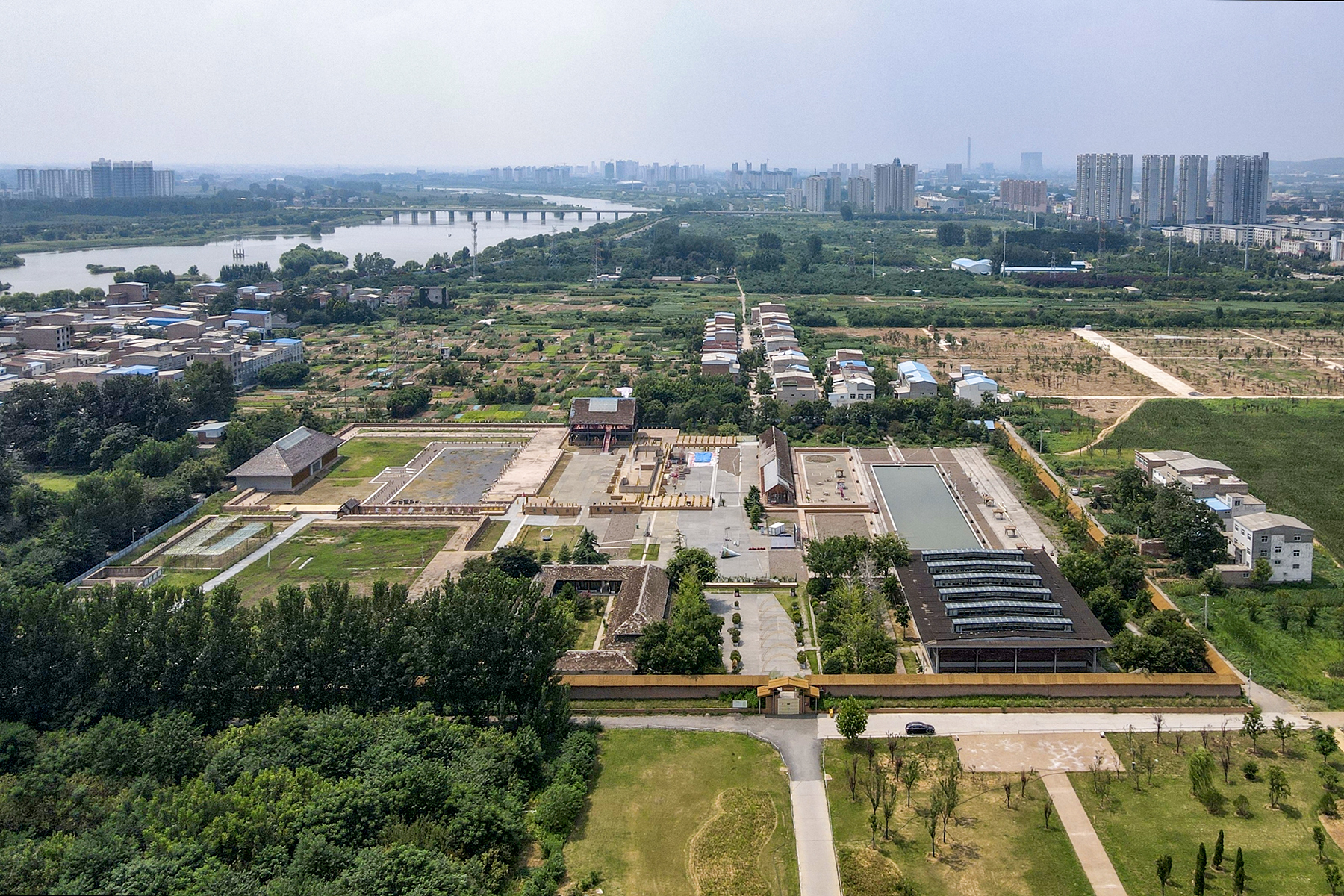
- Ruins of Yanshi Shang City with the skyline of Yanshi District in the background

- Location in Henan
- Coordinates: 34°43′37″N 112°47′24″E
- Country: People's Republic of China
- Province: Henan
- Prefecture-level city: Luoyang

Area
  - Total: 888 km^{2} (343 sq mi)

Population (2023)
  - Total: 543,100
- Time zone: UTC+8 (China Standard)
- Postal code: 471900

Yanshi District (simplified Chinese: 偃师区; traditional Chinese: 偃師區; pinyin: Yǎnshī Qū) is a district in the prefecture-level city of Luoyang in western Henan province, China. Yanshi lies on the Luo River and is the easternmost county-level division of Luoyang.

In 1993, Yanshi County became the county-level Yanshi City. In 2021, it became Yanshi District of Luoyang City.

== Administrative divisions ==
As of 2012, Yanshi is divided to 11 towns and 3 townships.

Towns

- Chengguan (城关镇)
- Shouyangshan (首阳山镇)
- Dianzhuang (佃庄镇)
- Zhaizhen (翟镇镇)
- Yuetan (岳滩镇)
- Guxian (顾县镇)
- Goushi (缑氏镇)
- Fudian (府店镇)
- Gaolong (高龙镇)
- Koudian (寇店镇)
- Pangcun (庞村镇)

Townships

- Shanhua Township (山化乡)
- Mangling Township (邙岭乡)
- Dakou Township (大口乡)

== Climate ==
Climate data for Yanshi, elevation 190 m (620 ft), (1991–2020 normals, extremes 1981–2010)
| Month | Jan | Feb | Mar | Apr | May | Jun | Jul | Aug | Sep | Oct | Nov | Dec | Year |
|---|---|---|---|---|---|---|---|---|---|---|---|---|---|
| Record high °C (°F) | 19.4 (66.9) | 23.2 (73.8) | 30.3 (86.5) | 38.5 (101.3) | 41.9 (107.4) | 42.7 (108.9) | 41.4 (106.5) | 39.3 (102.7) | 40.3 (104.5) | 35.2 (95.4) | 28.6 (83.5) | 22.7 (72.9) | 42.7 (108.9) |
| Mean daily maximum °C (°F) | 6.5 (43.7) | 10.5 (50.9) | 16.5 (61.7) | 23.3 (73.9) | 28.5 (83.3) | 32.9 (91.2) | 33.0 (91.4) | 31.3 (88.3) | 27.4 (81.3) | 21.9 (71.4) | 14.6 (58.3) | 8.4 (47.1) | 21.2 (70.2) |
| Daily mean °C (°F) | 1.0 (33.8) | 4.5 (40.1) | 10.2 (50.4) | 16.7 (62.1) | 22.1 (71.8) | 26.7 (80.1) | 27.8 (82.0) | 26.3 (79.3) | 21.8 (71.2) | 15.9 (60.6) | 8.7 (47.7) | 2.8 (37.0) | 15.4 (59.7) |
| Mean daily minimum °C (°F) | −3.2 (26.2) | −0.4 (31.3) | 4.9 (40.8) | 10.7 (51.3) | 16.2 (61.2) | 21.3 (70.3) | 23.7 (74.7) | 22.4 (72.3) | 17.4 (63.3) | 11.2 (52.2) | 4.1 (39.4) | −1.4 (29.5) | 10.6 (51.0) |
| Record low °C (°F) | −17.3 (0.9) | −16.8 (1.8) | −9.9 (14.2) | −1.8 (28.8) | 1.9 (35.4) | 11.8 (53.2) | 16.9 (62.4) | 12.9 (55.2) | 7.2 (45.0) | −2.4 (27.7) | −8.4 (16.9) | −12.8 (9.0) | −17.3 (0.9) |
| Average precipitation mm (inches) | 7.7 (0.30) | 10.3 (0.41) | 19.4 (0.76) | 33.5 (1.32) | 49.0 (1.93) | 64.6 (2.54) | 113.9 (4.48) | 95.9 (3.78) | 69.4 (2.73) | 37.1 (1.46) | 24.4 (0.96) | 5.1 (0.20) | 530.3 (20.87) |
| Average precipitation days | 3.5 | 3.9 | 4.9 | 5.6 | 7.3 | 7.7 | 10.4 | 10.0 | 8.7 | 6.5 | 5.2 | 2.8 | 76.5 |
| Average snowy days | 3.7 | 3.2 | 1.0 | 0.2 | 0 | 0 | 0 | 0 | 0 | 0 | 0.9 | 2.4 | 11.4 |
| Average relative humidity (%) | 59 | 58 | 55 | 58 | 59 | 59 | 73 | 76 | 72 | 68 | 67 | 60 | 64 |
| Mean monthly sunshine hours | 133.6 | 141.5 | 177.3 | 204.7 | 220.4 | 204.4 | 182.5 | 176.7 | 153.3 | 151.3 | 145.7 | 146.4 | 2,037.8 |
| Percentage possible sunshine | 43 | 45 | 48 | 52 | 51 | 47 | 42 | 43 | 42 | 44 | 47 | 48 | 46 |
Source: China Meteorological Administration

== Archaeological sites ==
=== Erlitou ===
Erlitou, the type site of the Erlitou culture (1900–1500 BC), was discovered in Yanshi in 1959. As the Erlitou culture is theorized to be the material culture of the Xia dynasty, the Yanshi site was theorized to be a Shang stronghold before the fall of the Xia.

=== Yanshi Shang City ===
In 1983, a walled city dating from 1600 BC was found 6 km (3.7 mi) north-east of the Erlitou site in Yanshi's Shixianggou Township. This city, later known as Yanshi Shang City (偃师商城, Yǎnshī Shāngchéng), had an area of nearly 200 ha (490 acres) and featured pottery characteristic of the Erligang culture. Some scholars—including the Xia–Shang–Zhou Chronology Project—identify it with the first Shang dynasty capital, Western Bo (西亳, Xībó) which was traditionally credited to King Tang after his defeat of the Xia dynasty.

During the 11th century BC, new city fortifications were constructed to "settle down the Rong armies" (息偃戎师, Yanshi in short) after the King Wu of Zhou and his Rong allies defeated the Shang.

== See also ==
- Battle of Yanshi
