= Houmuwu ding =

12th-century BC Chinese sacrificial vessel

- Chinese: 后母戊鼎
Transcriptions
Standard Mandarin
- Hanyu Pinyin: Hòumǔwù dǐng
- IPA: [xôʊ.mù.û tìŋ]

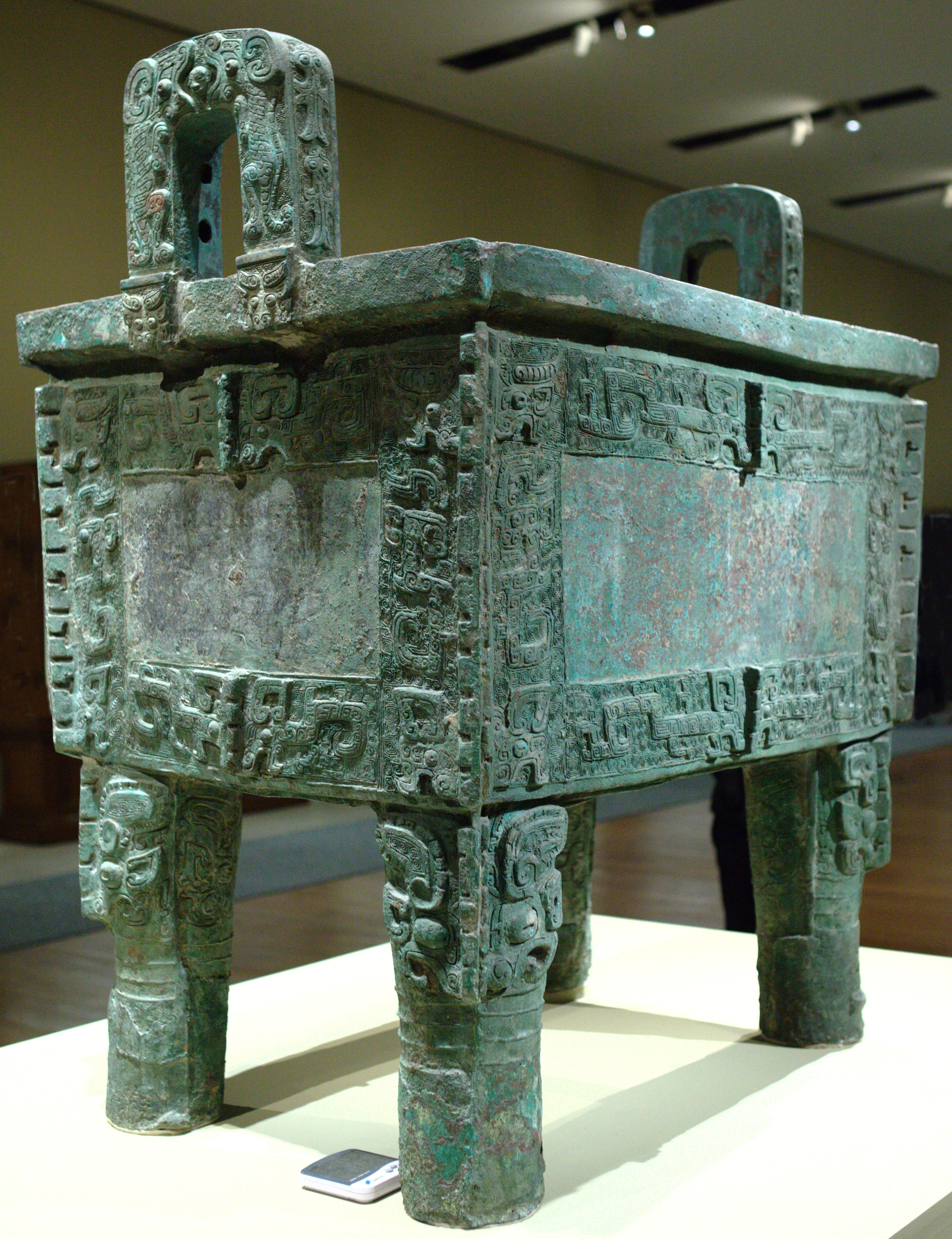
Houmuwu ding at the National Museum of China

The Houmuwu ding (Chinese: 后母戊鼎; pinyin: Hòumǔwù dǐng), also called Simuwu ding (司母戊鼎; Sīmǔwù dǐng), is a rectangular bronze ding (sacrificial vessel, one of the common types of Chinese ritual bronzes) of the ancient Chinese Shang dynasty. It is the heaviest piece of bronzeware to survive from anywhere in the ancient world. It was unearthed in 1939 in Wuguan Village, Anyang, Henan, near Yinxu, the site of the last Shang dynasty capital.

== Owner ==
The naming of bronzeware generally follows this principle: the last character is usually the type of the ware, e.g. ding, dou, hu, pan, or zun. Since this bronzeware is a ding, it is called XX ding. The specific type of ding depends on whether the ware has an inscription. If there is an inscription, the character in the inscription that can reflect the name of the owner of the ware is used as the name of the ding. There are a total of three characters inscribed on the vessel.

The ding is named for the inscription in bronzeware script on the interior wall, which reads "Queen Mother Wu" (后母戊; Hòumǔwù). This is the temple name of Fu Jing, queen and primary wife of Wu Ding. The ding was made after her death, presumably by her son, Zu Geng of Shang. While the ding itself was unearthed in 1939, in Wuguan Village (五官村), Anyang, Henan, Fu Jing's tomb (tomb 260 at Yinxu) was not located until 1959, and was found to have been looted.

== Discovery ==
The Ding was unearthed in Anyang, Henan in 1939. In October 1946, after an on-site interview by reporter Shao Shenzhi, it was confirmed to be a bronze vessel from the Shang Dynasty. The inscription was interpreted as "Queen Wu" or "Wife Wu". In November, scholar Zhang Feng interpreted the inscription as "Simu Wu". It was named "Simu Wu Large Square Ding". In 1959, Guo Moruo believed that "Si" is the same as "Si", which means that the tripod was cast by Wu's son to worship his mother. So it was named "Simu Wu Ding".

== Description ==
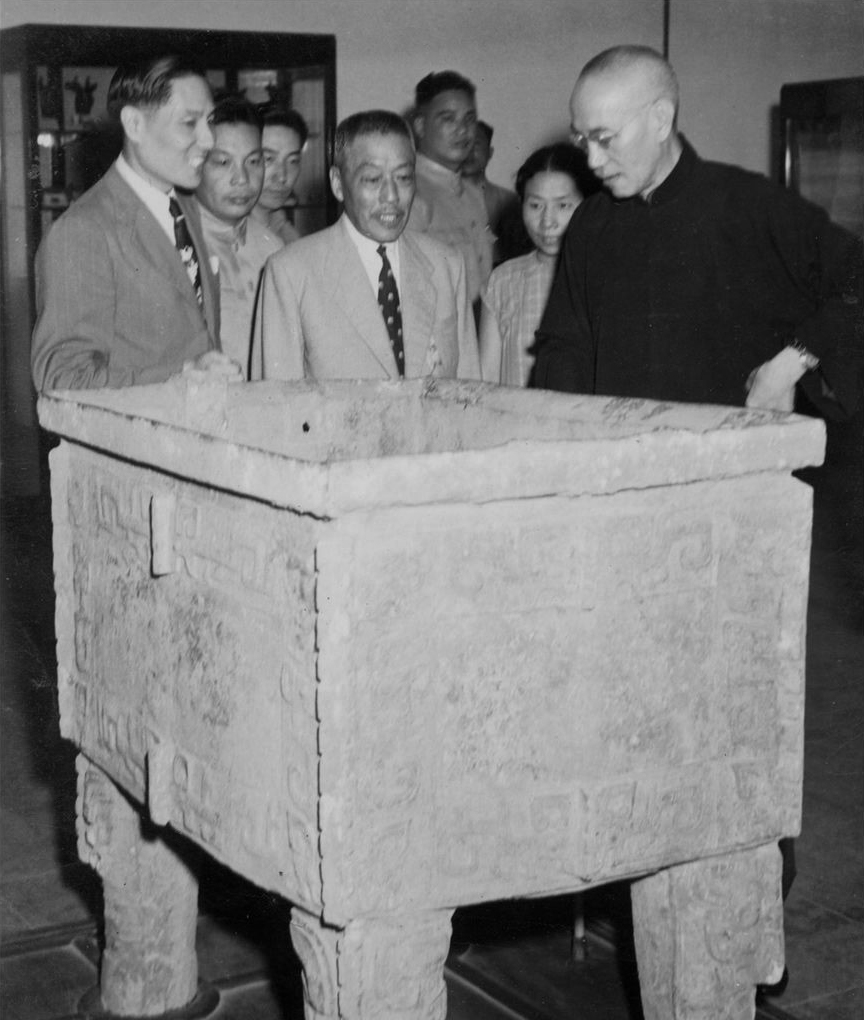
Chiang Kai-shek (right) inspecting the Houmuwu ding in 1948

The ding is of the rectangular type, with four legs. It is 133 cm (52 in) high, 110 cm (43 in) wide, 79 cm (31 in) deep, and weighs 832.84 kg (1,836.1 lb). Compared to earlier ding, such as the Duling fangdings (杜岭方鼎), it is wider and its walls are thicker, making it much more massive. Each side has a blank space in the middle, surrounded by a band of decoration featuring taotie (animal faced creatures) and kuilong (one-legged dragons). There are two handles, each decorated on the exterior with two tigers facing each other, their jaws closing around a human head in between them, an image which is also found on Fu Hao battle axes.

The vessel is the largest and heaviest ancient Chinese bronzeware yet discovered. It is the only one of its kind in the world, and is a representative work of Shang bronzeware.

=== Epigraphic readings ===
The inscription was originally transcribed as sīmǔwù (司母戊). After 1949, Guo Moruo, then president of the Chinese Academy of Sciences, interpreted the inscription as sīmǔwù. Guo interpreted the word sī as meaning "sacrifice" and "Wù" as the temple name of the owner of the tomb. In 1977, Li Xueqin proposed that the first glyph in the inscription should be read as hòu (后; ''queen''), rejecting sī because simuwu is a verb-object construction rare in the epigraphic record. This interpretation provoked much discussion among scholars. Sun Ji pointed out that many oracle bone inscriptions can be written in horizontal reflection, and hòu (后; ''queen'') is the horizontal reflection of si (司). In March 2011, after the renovation of the National Museum of China reopened, in the special display of "ancient Chinese bronze art", Sīmǔwù has been renamed as Hòumǔwù.

== See also ==
- List of Chinese cultural relics forbidden to be exhibited abroad
