= Zu Jia =

Shang dynasty king

Zu Jia 祖甲
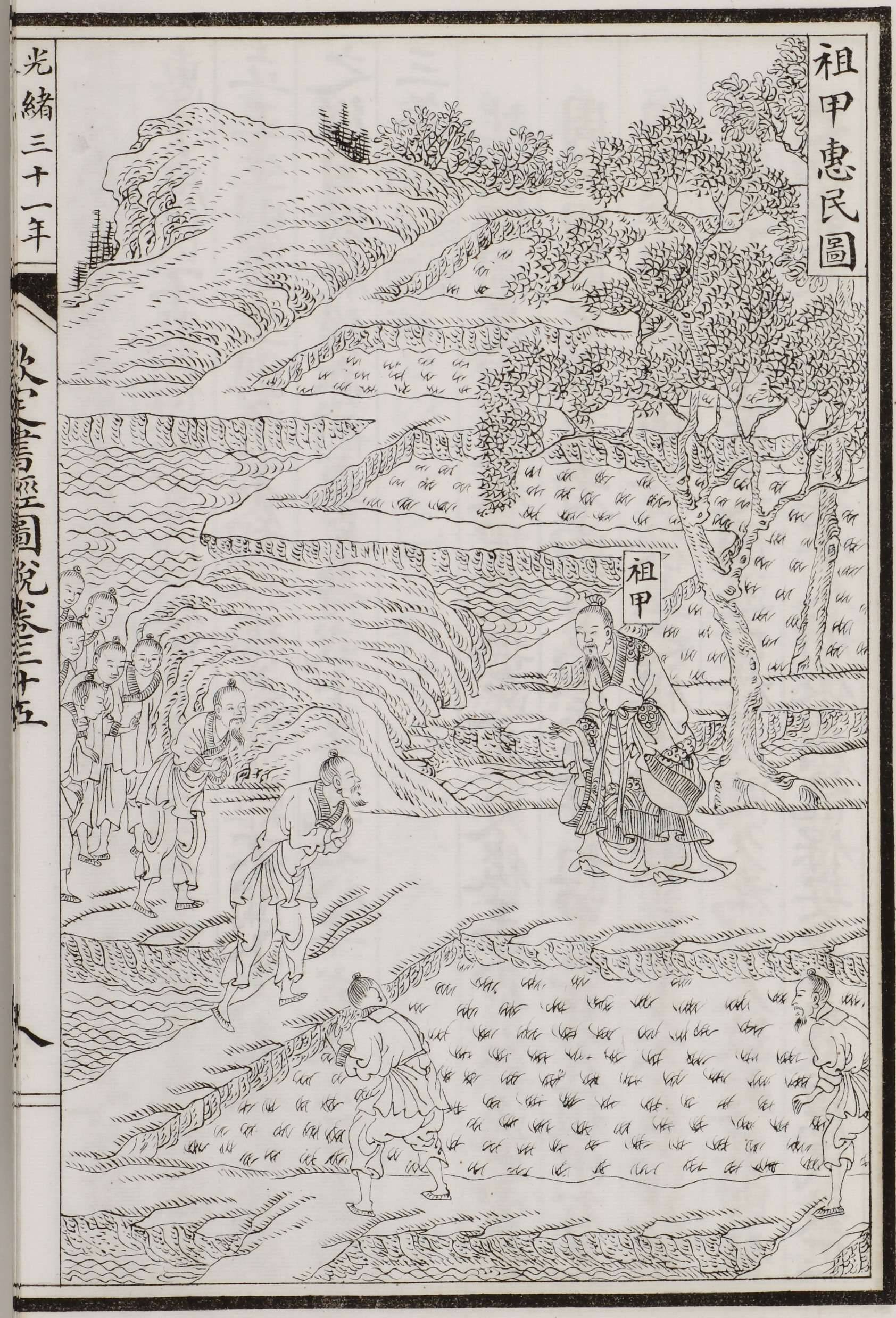

King of Shang dynasty
- Reign: 1184 BCE - ?
- Predecessor: Zu Geng
- Successor: Lin Xin or Geng Ding
- Spouse: Bi Wu (妣戊)
- Issue: Zi Xiao; Zi Liang
Names
- Family name: Zi (子); Given name: Zai (載)
- Father: Wu Ding
- Mother: Fu Jing

Zu Jia (祖甲) (died in the middle of the 12th century BC) or Di Jia (帝甲), personal name Zǐ Zǎi (子載), was a Shang dynasty King of China. He was the third recorded son of Wu Ding, the first Chinese monarch verified by contemporary records. Having inherited a large realm built up by his father and brother, he led the Shang kingdom through its last brief period of stability. After his reign, Shang went into irreversible decline.

Zu Jia reigned during the first half of the 12th century BC, from the city of Yin, the ancient historical capital of the Shang. He is known to have started religious and succession reforms to solve previously concerning problems. His period marked the rise of Predynastic Zhou, which began to develop more complex relations with the Shang court after Wu Ding's death.

== Early life ==
Little is known about Zu Jia's early life. He was a royal member of the Shang dynasty, which had been ruling the Yellow River valley since the 16th century BC. He was one of three male children of Wu Ding, born to Wu's principal queen consort, Fu Jing. He had two older brothers, Zu Geng and Zu Ji, and a sister, Xiao Chen Tao.

His father Wu Ding was one of the most notable rulers of the Shang dynasty. After over 59 years, starting around 1250 BC, Wu Ding transformed Shang from a declining country into a powerful state, expanding its influence beyond the Yellow River to reach the faraway lands of the Yangtze and modern Shaanxi. Zu Geng's eldest brother Zu Ji (祖己) was titled "Xiaowang" (小王, "Expectant King") and appointed Wu Ding's successor. Zu Ji died early, and was replaced by Zi Yue, later known as Zu Geng. During Zu Geng's reign, the prince Zi Zai became the Expectant King.

== Reign as king ==
Zu Jia succeeded his brother Zu Geng, resuming Shang's tradition of fraternal succession. The Xia-Shang-Zhou Chronology Project places Zu Jia's reign between 1184 - 1177 BC. The Bamboo Annals (竹書紀年) gives another time frame, which David Nivison identified as 1177 - 1156 BC. The year of his succession, according to Nivison, explains his regnal name. According to the Shang dynasty's naming rules, the king's regnal era was named after the first day in the year of succession. 1177 BC began with a gui day in sexagenary cycle. The gui name was taboo since it coincided with the name of the Shang ancestor Shi Gui (主癸, father of Cheng Tang). As a result, the next day of gui, jia, was chosen to be regnal name. The other character, Zu, was used to distinguish the king from other monarchs who shared the same regnal era name, jia.

His capital was at Yin (殷). The founding of the city was traditionally traced back to Pan Geng, Zu Jia's great uncle, who is believed to have founded Yin around 1300 BC. In Wu Ding's time, Yin flourished and became the political and cultural center of the kingdom.

His father had re-asserted and firmly established Shang suzerainty over a large area. When Wu died, Zu Geng conquered and destroyed the remaining remnants of confrontational tribes that had not been fully subdued. Zu Jia, consequently, inherited a powerful country with numerous vassal states.

In the 12th year of his reign, he sent troops to fight Rong people in the west until winter.

In the 13th year of his reign, after being defeated, the West Rong people sent an envoy to Shang. In the same year he ordered the vassal of Fen (邠) to establish an army at Gan (绀).

In the 24th year of his reign, he reproduced the Penalties that were used by Tang of Shang to repress the rebellion.

Oracle bone inscriptions of his reign show that he changed some aspects of the Shang religion. His modification was targeted at sacrifices. Decades before, Wu Ding had reformed the sacrificial system by restricting the number of sacrifice to ancestors; the situation in which he announced the reform is recorded in the Book of Documents (Shangshu). Zu Jia reversed the reform, increasing the quantity of ancestral sacrifices, while reducing sacrifices to mythical spirits.

=== Succession rule alterations ===
In the 27th year of his reign, he named his twin sons as prince Zi Xiao (子嚣) and Zi Liang (子良).

The Shang followed the rule of fraternal succession throughout many generations. The tradition was first practiced by Cheng Tang's offspring, who passed it down to subsequent rulers. Nivison claimed that this was done in order to prevent the risk of outside interference; he derived the theory from the Bamboo Annals, which contains an entry detailing Yi Yin's usurpation of the throne from Tai Jia. The convention continued to Wu Ding, who might have followed it if he had had living siblings or cousins. Wu Ding, however, due to his 59-year reign, had outlived all possible candidates for fraternal succession and instead had to rely on his children. Zu Ji predeceased his father, so Zu Ding and Zu Jia were the only two options. After Zu Geng, agnatic seniority was again applied to succession. That posed a new threat of fraternal usurpation. Zu Jia solved the problem by directly granting his chosen heir a royal ganzhi name, thus ensuring stability.

Sima Qian's Records of the Grand Historian states that succeeding Zu Jia was his son Lin Xin. However, the Bamboo Annals says that Lin Xin had died before his father, and therefore did not become king. Instead, the successor was his other son, Zi Xiao, who was granted the title "Geng Ding" used later as the regnal name.

== Family ==
The Shang dynasty is only verified through historical documents from the time of Wu Ding. However, the essentially developed status of the civilization from that time indicates that there were actual kings before Wu. The list below presents Zu Jia's family in five generations.

- Grandfather: Xiao Yi. 20th Shang king.

Great-uncles:

- Yang Jia, 17th Shang king.
- Pan Geng, 18th Shang king. Traditionally regarded to be the founder of the Shang capital Yin.
- Xiao Xin, 19th Shang king. His reign saw the kingdom declining and losing dominance.

Father: Wu Ding, reportedly succeeded the throne on January 4, 1250 BC or 1247 BC. He was an excellent monarch who restored the Shang and brought back its lost glory.

Mother: Fu Jing, one of Wu Ding's three Principal wives. She acted as a priestess and a general in Wu Ding's court. Her position was similarly equal to Fu Hao's.

Siblings:

- Zu Geng, 22nd Shang king.
- Zu Ji, initially titled "Expectant King" but died early.
- Xiao Chen Tao, a princess who was granted authority and personal lands by her father Wu Ding.

Children:

- Lin Xin, 24th Shang king whose reign is not confirmed by the Bamboo Annals.
- Geng Ding, 25th Shang king.

Grandchildren: Wu Yi, 26th Shang king.

== Death ==
The Xia-Shang-Zhou Chronology Project gives his death year as 1177 BC, several years after his accession. The records in the Bamboo Annals can be interpreted to indicate that his death occurred in 1156 BC. After his death, he was given a royal funeral, organized by his immediate heir (recorded as Lin Xin or Geng Ding) and buried in the Shang royal cemetery at Xibeigang.

Like his brother Zu Geng, Zu Jia was one of the first Shang kings to be buried in the cemetery's West zone. The section was founded by Wu Ding, aimed to separate Wu's successors from his ancestors. Zu Jia was interred in Tomb 1003, near his brother's tomb (1004). His tomb formed a cluster with that of Zu Ji and Zu Geng,and was positioned so that he could pay respect to his predecessors.

Zu Jia Shang dynasty
Preceded by Zu Geng	King of China	Succeeded by Lin Xin
