= Sun Ji =

Sun Ji may refer to:

- Sun Ji (孫冀), a fictional character in Romance of the Three Kingdoms, see List of fictional people of the Three Kingdoms#Chapter 120.
- Sun Sheng (Southern Tang) (died 956), known as Sun Ji (孫忌) at one point.
- Sun Ji (footballer) (孙吉) (born 1982), Chinese footballer.
- Sun Ji (archaeologist), a Chinese cultural relics scholar and archaeologist.
