= Fu Jing =

Fu Jing may refer to:

- Fu Jing (Shang dynasty)
- Fu Jing (singer)
