= Tomb of Fu Hao =

Shang Dynasty royal tomb

Coordinates: 36°7′15.71″N 114°18′58.34″E

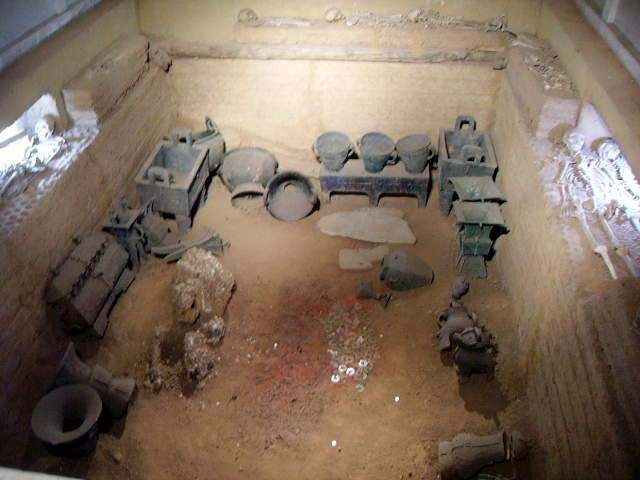
The tomb's burial pit

The Fu Hao owl zun discovered in the tomb

The Tomb of Fu Hao (traditional Chinese: 婦好墓; simplified Chinese: 妇好墓; pinyin: Fù Hǎo Mù) lies within Yinxu, the site of the Late Shang capital, within the modern city of Anyang in Henan, China. The tomb was discovered in 1976 by Zheng Zhenxiang and excavated by the Anyang Working Team of the Archaeological Institute of the Chinese Academy of Social Sciences, who designated the tomb as M5. It is to date the only Shang royal tomb found intact with its contents and excavated by archaeologists.

Among the wealth of goods found in the tomb were bronze vessels bearing the name of Fu Hao, who is mentioned on oracle bones as a military leader and consort of king Wu Ding, who reigned c. 1200 BCE. After extensive restoration the tomb was opened to the public in 1999.

== Discovery and contents ==
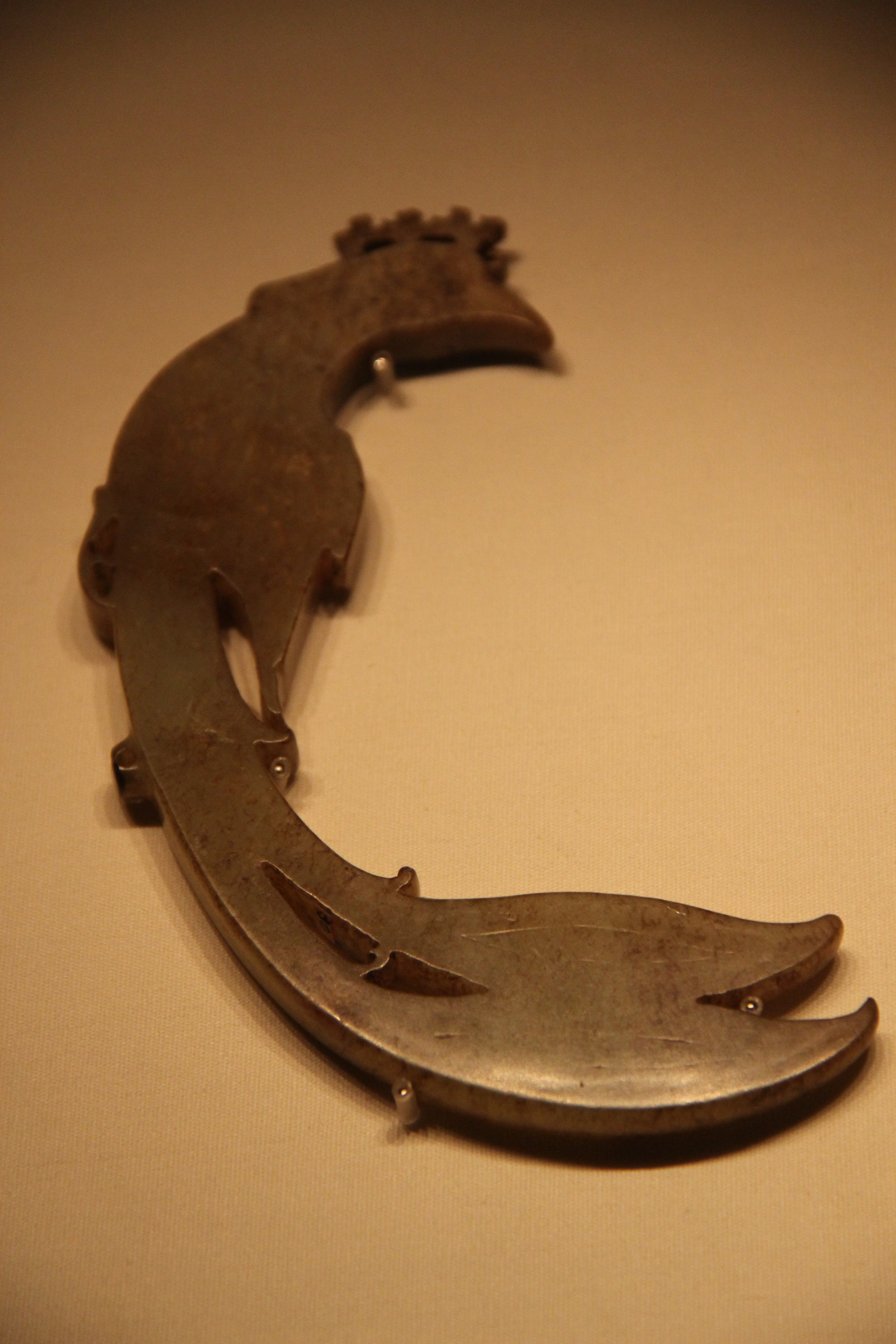
A jade phoenix, probably some centuries earlier than the tomb

In 1976, Zheng Zhenxiang and her archaeological team were probing the area around Yinxu with a long shovel, called a luoyang shovel, and recovered some samples of red lacquer. The burial pit uncovered, officially numbered as tomb #5, has dimensions 5.6 m × 4 m (18 ft × 13 ft) and was located just outside the main royal cemetery. The tomb has been dated to c. 1200 BCE and identified, from inscriptions on ritual bronzes, to be that of Fu Hao.

Her tomb, one of the smaller tombs, is one of the best-preserved Shang dynasty royal tombs and the only one not to have been looted before excavation. Inside the pit was evidence of a wooden chamber of dimensions 5 m × 3.5 m × 1.3 m (16.4 ft × 11.5 ft × 4.3 ft) that contained a lacquered wooden coffin that had since completely rotted away.

The floor level housed the royal corpse and most of the utensils and implements buried with her. Rare jade artifacts, such as those of the Liangzhu culture, were probably collected by Fu Hao as antiques. While some of the bronze artifacts were probably used by the lady and her household, others inscribed with her posthumous name of Mu Xin were undoubtedly cast as grave goods. The artifacts in the grave consisted of:

- 755 jade objects (including Longshan, Liangzhu, Hongshan and Shijiahe cultural artifacts)
- 564 bone objects (including 500 hairpins and 20 arrowheads)
- 468 bronze objects, including over 200 ritual bronze vessels, 130 weapons, 23 bells, 27 knives, 4 mirrors, and 4 tiger statues
- 63 stone objects
- 11 pottery objects
- 5 ivory objects
- 6,900 cowry shells (used as currency during the Shang dynasty)

Below the corpse was a small pit holding the remains of six sacrificial dogs, and along the edge lay the skeletons of 16 human slaves, evidence of human sacrifice.

There is also evidence above ground of a structure built over the tomb that probably served as an ancestral hall for holding memorial ceremonies; this has since been restored.

By connecting the jade artifact in the tomb of Fu Hao to much earlier artifact through stylistic and technical analysis, the archaeological context has identified an early collector, a woman who gathered about her artifacts of a much earlier period.

== See also ==
- Tomb of Marquis Yi of Zeng, dated to 433 BCE, the other major Chinese royal tomb found intact.
