= Shao Wangping =

Chinese archaeologist

Shao Wangping (邵望平) (born 1937) is a Chinese archaeologist. She married Gao Guangren (born 1938), a fellow archaeologist and colleague at the Institute of Archaeology. Both Shao and Gao graduated from Peking University, where they studied from 1945 to 1959. Their shared academic background and professional collaboration would later define their careers and cement them as important academics in their own rights. Still, it is recognised that Shao's influence stretched far beyond her husband's (Hein et al., 2023) due to the extent and significance of her work in leading fieldwork, producing detailed excavation reports throughout her academic career and collaborative work with other academics.

Shao was unique in that she did not have children, so she could focus on her research more intensively than many of her female peers who were parents. In this regard, she was similar to Zheng Zhenxiang, another prominent archaeologist, who also balanced her personal and professional life through support from her spouse. She still had to challenge the stigma around her upbringing: her career was tainted by being from a land-owning family (Shao, Li 2011). The PropertylawinChina (or rather, the challenges for farmers to achieve land ownership in rural areas under the Chinese government) places a heavy taboo on land that was owned by individuals in urban areas, with the widespread belief that land is unavailable and unfairly concentrated in the hands of 'landlords' (Johnson, 2019). This tension has resulted in violence and uprisings throughout history, such as in 1949, where up to two million farmers considered 'landlords' were killed across the country). Shao's family, and Shao by extension, were therefore criticised for their land ownership. Possibly because of this reputation, she wasn't awarded the title of Research Associate and Professor at the Graduate School of the Institute until 1990, despite having already made significant contributions to the academic sphere.

== Contributions to Chinese Archaeology ==
Shao Wangping's academic contributions to Chinese archaeology are extensive and significant. She is renowned for emphasising long-term, extensive fieldwork and argues that this methodology is crucial for collecting thorough and meaningful research (Shao and Li 2011). As previously stated, she was prominent in the field and academic spheres, producing numerous detailed and nuanced fieldwork reports from the excavations she headed. This dedication to prolonged, continuous work in the field has been a distinctive element of her work.

Shao's most notable contribution to Chinese Archaeology is her comprehensive history of Shandong, covering the period from the Palaeolithic to the Western Han dynasty (Hein et al., 2023). She co-authored this work with her husband, and it is still regarded as seminal to the study of this region. Additionally, Shao collaborated with other academics to further study paleoenvironmental reconstruction and the history of Chinese astronomy (Shao 2014). Shao is also widely recognised for her scholarship on the origins of Chinese civilisation, a subject still currently debated within Chinese archaeology. Her work on this topic is frequently cited. It remains a crucial reference within these discussions (Chang et al., 2005; Hein et al., 2023).

Alongside her own work, Shao has assisted in writing numerous scholarly books in both Chinese and English throughout her academic career. Her contributions to Chang et al. (2005), Xia (1992), Xu and Zhang (2004), and Zhongguo (1962) have extended her influence and cemented her as a highly respected figure in Chinese Archaeology. Her profound impact and the vastness of her work mean she is still regarded as a leading figure for her excavations and academic writing.
