= Simu Xin Ding =

Ancient Chinese cauldron

The Simu Xin Ding (Chinese: 司母辛鼎) is a ding, or an ancient Chinese vessel used for sacrifices by the Shang dynasty royal family. It was found at Yinxu in the tomb of Fu Hao, a wife of King Wu Ding of the Shang dynasty.
