= Fu Jing (Shang dynasty) =

Shang dynasty consort

Fu Jing 婦妌
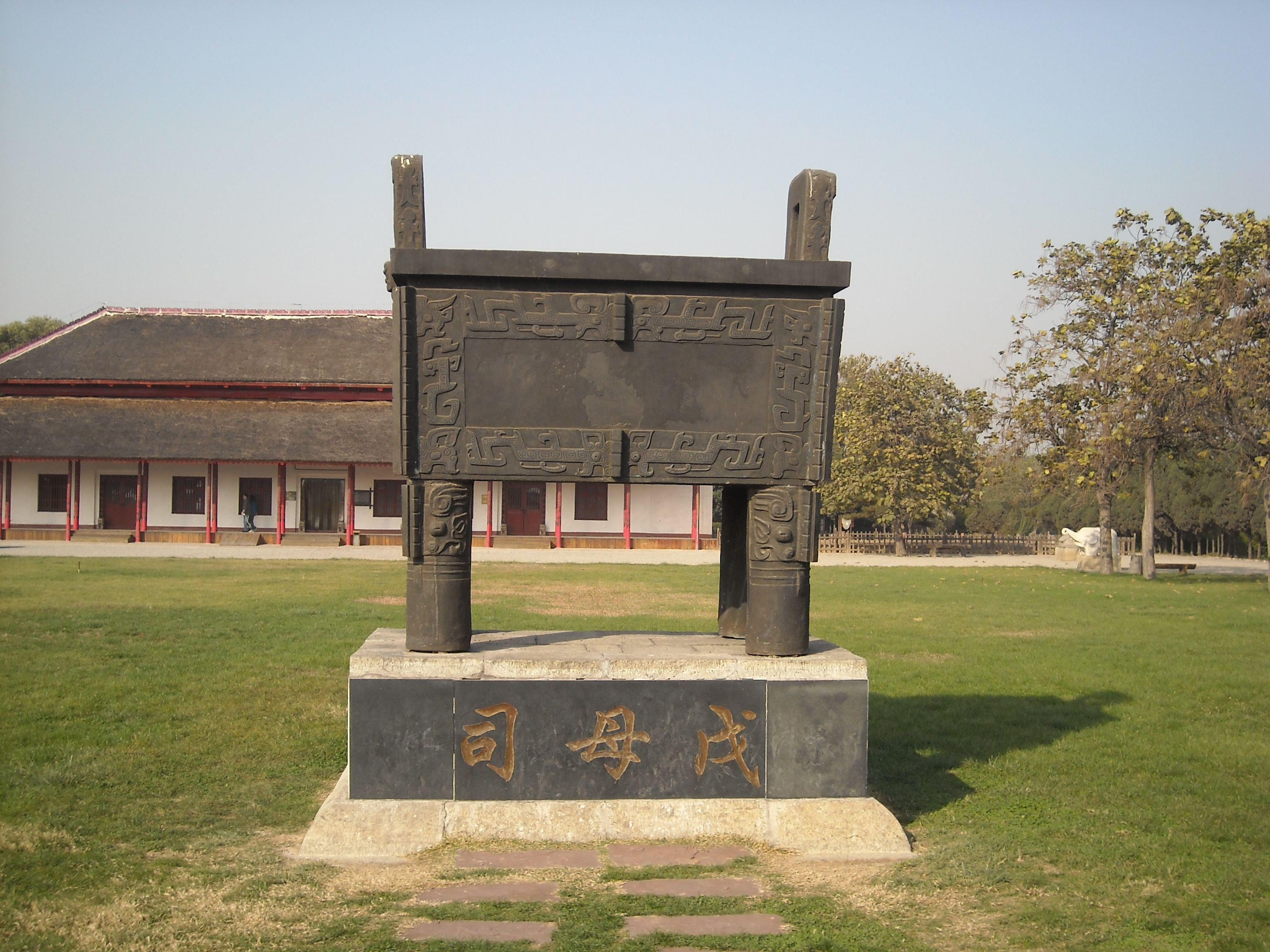
- Enlarged replica of the houmuwu ding with Fu Jing's temple name listed.

Queen of Shang dynasty
- Burial: Yinxu
- Spouse: Wu Ding
- Issue: Zu Geng; Zu Jia
Full name
- Given name: Jing (妌)
Posthumous name
- Bi Wujing (妣戊妌)
Temple name
- Houmuwu (后母戊)
- Military career
- Allegiance: Shang dynasty

Fu Jing was a Shang dynasty queen of Wu Ding and recipient of the Houmuwu sacrificial vessel.

== Name ==
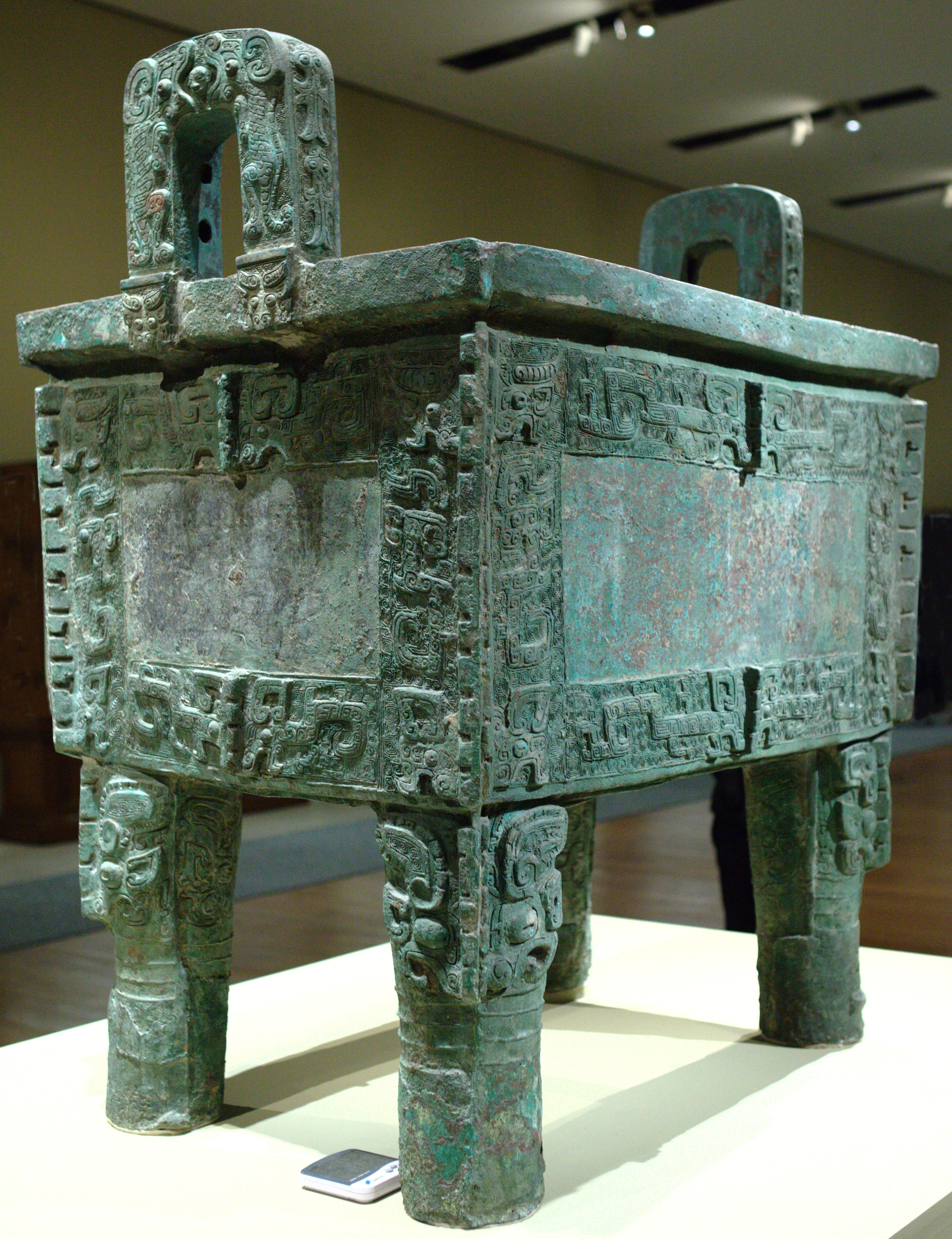
The Houmuwu Sacrificial Vessel

The name Fu Jing comes from the title fu (婦) "consort," and her given name. This is what was used during her life, around the time of Wu Ding's reign.

Fu Jing is posthumously referred to in later oracle bones as Bi Wu (妣戊) or Bi Wujing (妣戊妌) in the context of ancestor veneration, as a form of posthumous name:

惟妣戊妌小𫳅王受祐
Is it Lady Wu Jing who we should perform a small sacrifice of domesticated lambs to, and if so, will the ruler receive protection?

The bi (妣) part of the name is a title for any deceased ancestress. Given that wu (戊) is a Heavenly Stem, this name heavily implies that sacrifices to Fu Jing must have occurred on the fifth day of the ten-day week, similar to other members of royalty. Finally, the jing appears to have been her given name.

The hou (后) "queen" part of the Houmuwu ding is disputed, and has been alternatively interpreted as si (司) "to offer," on the basis of the "queen" meaning not appearing during the Shang period yet. If read in this way, the phrase becomes "to offer to Mother Wu," resulting in an identical temple name Mother (母) + Day of Sacrifice (a Heavenly Stem) structure to "Mu Xin," Fu Hao's name.

== Biography ==
Although Wu Ding reportedly had over 60 wives, he had only three queens: Fu Jing, Fu Hao, and Fu Shi (婦嬕). Like Wu Ding's other wives, Fu Jing participated in military expeditions, reflected in inscriptions discussing whether to call her for an invasion against the Longfang:

貞勿呼婦妌伐龍方
Charge: Should we not call Fu Jing to invade the Longfang?

Fu Jing would also perform divination for the state.

丁末卜X婦妌侑X賓X
On the dingwei day, plastromancy was performed. [Charge]: Should Fu Jing perform a you-sacrifice (Note: Sacrifice wherein an ancestor is beckoned to eat with the Shang) [for?] Bin [unknown]?

Some of the divinations Fu Jing conducted focused on procuring millet, so Zheng Zhenxiang has suggested that she was responsible for agricultural management.

甲寅卜古貞婦妌受黍年
On the jiayin day, plastromancy was performed. Gu charges: Will Fu Jing receive a good millet harvest?

癸酉卜𬆩貞婦妌不其受黍年二月
On the guiyou day, plastromancy was performed. Nan charges: May Fu Jing not receive a millet harvest? Second month.

Several divinations were made by Nan and Zheng towards whether or not a pregnancy would go well, similar to Fu Hao.

壬午卜𬆩貞婦妌娩嘉
On the renwu day, plastromancy was performed. Nan charges: When Fu Jing gives birth, will it be a fortunate one?

X卜爭貞婦妌娩嘉王𰉏曰其惟庚娩嘉旬辛X婦妌娩允嘉二月
On [...] day, plastromancy was performed. Zheng charges: Will Fu Jing's pregnancy be a fortunate one? The King (Wu Ding) prognosticates: It may be the geng day where the pregnancy is auspicious; 10 days later, on a xin day, Fu Jing gave birth; Indeed, it was a fortunate one! Second month.

== Death ==
After Fu Jing's death, either Zu Jia or Zu Geng commissioned the production of the Houmuwu ding in her memory. It is generally believed to be Zu Geng, on a kinship basis, as the son generation usually use mu (母) in ancestor veneration, whereas later generations use bi (妣).

=== Proposed tomb ===
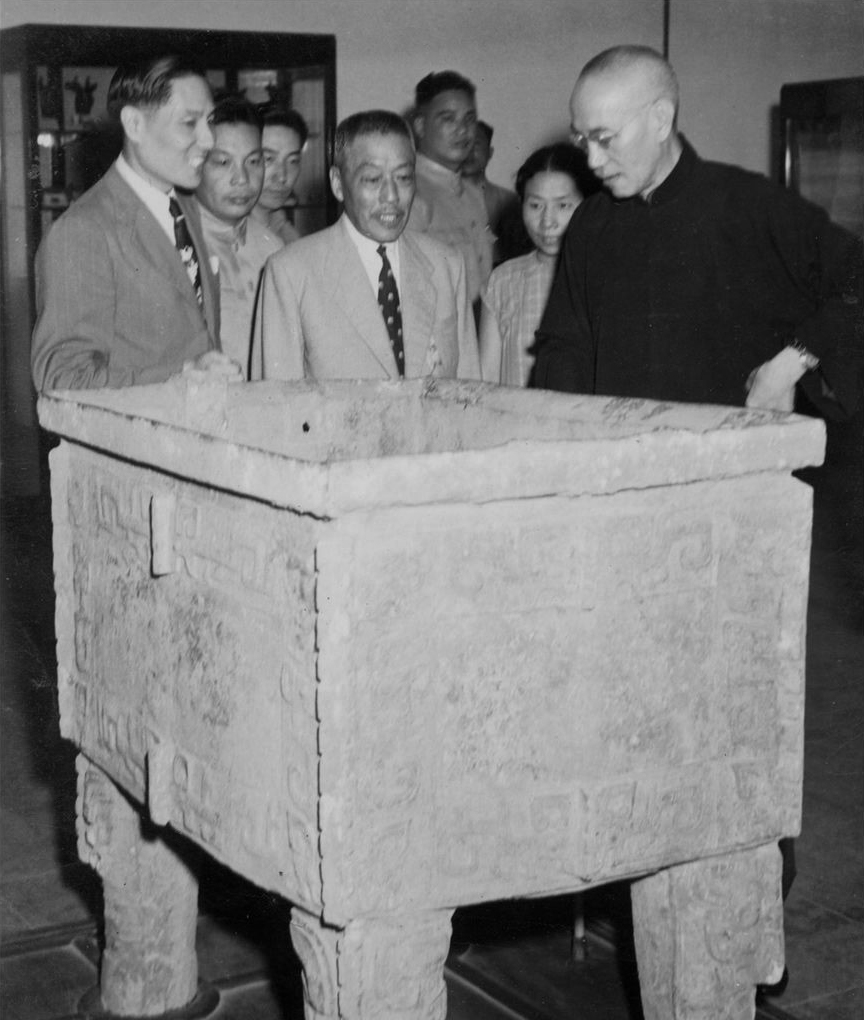
Chiang Kai-shek examining the Houmuwu ding.

The Houmuwu ding was unearthed by villagers in 1939, but was reburied due to an ongoing war before being dug up again in 1946. Upon the spot being reinvestigated by archaeologists, the tomb now labelled 84AWBM260 was discovered. The tomb is large, with a single ramp, a smaller tomb, and several sacrificial pits, but had been badly robbed. While the evidence is circumstantial, Uchida and Mizoguchi note that the position appears to denote respect towards M1400. If this were the tomb of Wu Ding, it would make sense for this tomb to be Fu Jing's in-context.

== See also ==
- Women in ancient and imperial China
