= Zu Geng of Shang =

Zu Geng 祖庚

King of Shang dynasty
- Reign: 1191–1184 BCE
- Predecessor: Wu Ding
- Successor: Zu Jia
- Died: 1184 BCE
Names
- Family name: Zi (子); Given name: Yue (躍)
- Father: Wu Ding
- Mother: Fu Jing

Zu Geng (祖庚), personal name Zi Yue, was king of the Shang dynasty of China.

== Reign ==
Zu Geng's capital was at Yin (殷), where he allegedly wrote The Instructions of Gaozong (高宗之訓). Zu Geng is thought to have been the commissioner and dedicator of the Houmuwu ding, which he had cast in memory of his mother, Fu Jing.

He ruled for seven years from 1191, after the death of his father Wu Ding, and was succeeded by his brother Zu Jia in 1184. However, the Bamboo Annals state that he ruled for eleven years.

Zu Geng of Shang Shang dynasty
Preceded by Wu Ding	King of China	Succeeded by Zu Jia
