= Fu Hao =

Shang dynasty general, diviner, Queen consort to King Wu Ding

- Queen consort (婦)
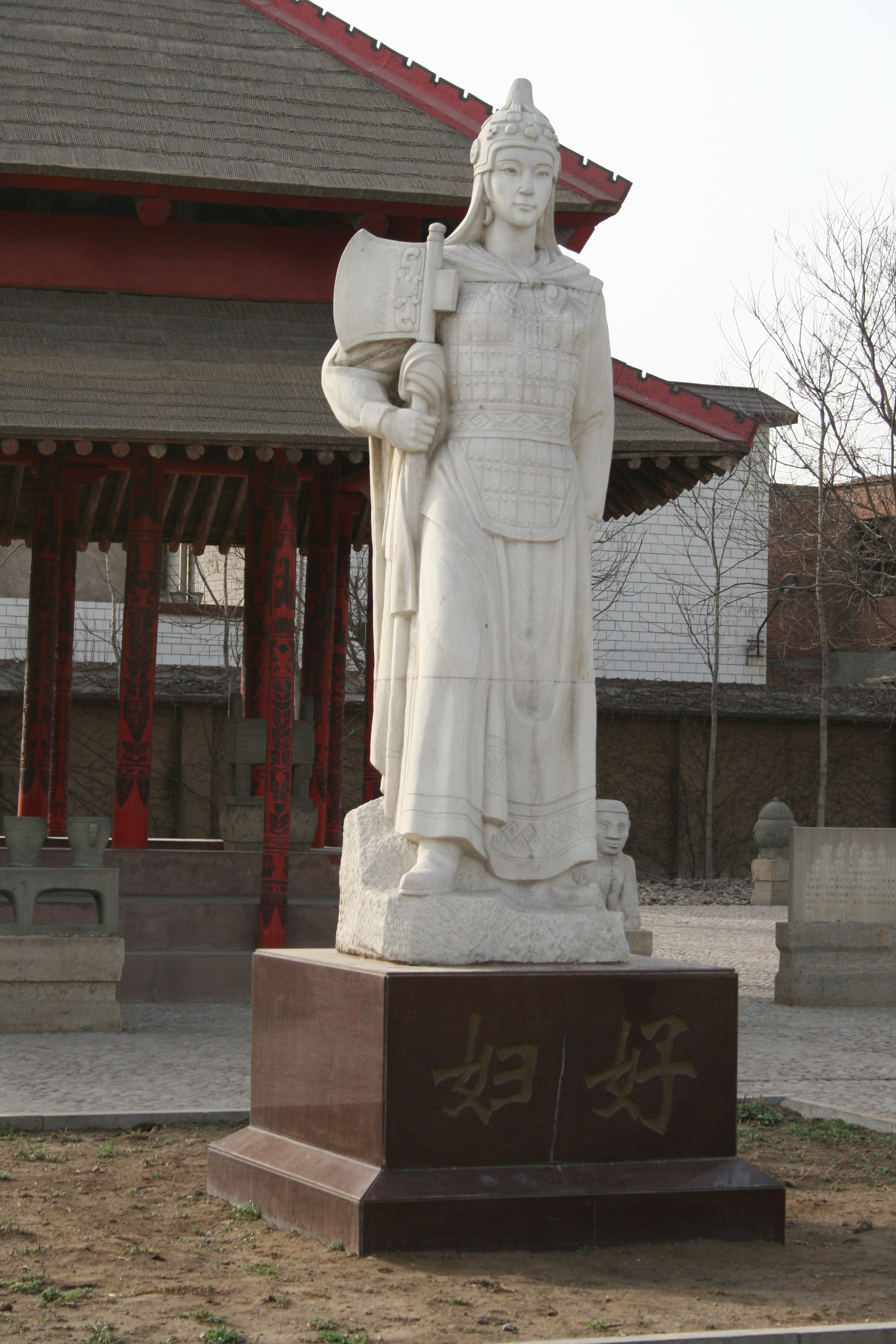
- Modern statue of Fu Hao outside her tomb at Yinxu
- Died: c. 1200 BC; Yinxu, Shang
- Spouse: King Wu Ding
- Issue: Prince Jie; Unknown Daughter
Full name
- Given name: Hao or Zi (好)
Temple name
- Mu Xin (母辛)
- Dynasty: Shang
- Occupation: Military general; Priestess
- Military career
- Allegiance: Shang dynasty

Consort Hao/Zi
- Traditional Chinese: 婦好
- Simplified Chinese: 妇好
Transcriptions
Standard Mandarin
- Hanyu Pinyin: fù hǎo fù zǐ
- Bopomofo: ㄈㄨˋ ㄏㄠˇ ㄈㄨˋ ㄗˇ
- Wade–Giles: fu^{4} hao^{3} fu^{4} tzu^{3}
Wu
- Romanization: vu^{6} hau^{5} vu^{6} tsy^{5}
Yue: Cantonese
- Jyutping: fu^{5} hou^{2} fu^{5} zi^{2}
Middle Chinese
- Middle Chinese: bjuwX xawX bjuwX tsiX
Old Chinese
- Baxter–Sagart (2014): /*mə.bəʔ qʰˤuʔ/ /*mə.bəʔ [ts]əʔ/
- Zhengzhang: /*bɯʔ qʰuːʔ/ /*bɯʔ ʔslɯʔ/

Temple name
- Chinese: 母辛
Transcriptions
Standard Mandarin
- Hanyu Pinyin: mǔ xīn
- Bopomofo: ㄇㄨˇ ㄒㄧㄣ
- Wade–Giles: mu^{3} hsin^{1}
Wu
- Romanization: mu^{6} shin^{5}
Yue: Cantonese
- Jyutping: mou^{5} san^{1}
Middle Chinese
- Middle Chinese: muwX sin
Old Chinese
- Baxter–Sagart (2014): /*məʔ [s]i[n]/
- Zhengzhang: /*mɯʔ siŋ/

Fu Hao (traditional Chinese: 婦好; simplified Chinese: 妇好; pinyin: Fù Hǎo) (Note: Several scholars (Childs-Johnson (2003), Zhang Zhenglang (1983, 1986), Chung (1985), etc.) propose that 婦好 be read as Fù Zǐ (lit. "Lady [surnamed] Zi"), interpreting the graph 好 as a phono-semantic compound with phonetic 子 and radical 女, which was used "as a heraldic and function and gender classifier" to distinguish women's surnames from men's.) died c. 1200 BC, posthumous temple name Mu Xin (母辛), was one of the many wives of King Wu Ding of the Shang dynasty and also served as a military general and high priestess. Fu Hao's life and military achievements are known almost entirely from the contents of her tomb, rather than from literary records.

The Tomb of Fu Hao was unearthed intact in 1976 at Yinxu by archaeologist Zheng Zhenxiang, with treasures, known as her 700+ jade objects (Fu Hao was a collector, so some were already antiques), and also her collection of more than 500 bone objects, such as oracle bones (they were from her role as a religious priestess, and were used in her many rituals). Along with the jade and bone objects, Fu Hao was buried with 6 dogs, and 16 human sacrifices. Inside the pit was evidence of a wooden chamber 5 metres (16 feet) long, 3.5 metres (11 feet) wide and 1.3 metres (4.3 feet) high containing a lacquered wooden coffin that has since completely disintegrated. The tomb of Fu Hao provides much insight into her life, her relationship with the royal family, and her military role and achievements.

Fu Hao was a close contemporary of the ancient Egyptian pharaoh Tutankhamun, whose tomb was also found generally intact. For this reason, she has been described as the "Chinese Tutankhamun".

== Biography ==
King Wu Ding of Shang cultivated relationships with neighbouring tribes by marrying one woman from each of them. Fu Hao (who was believed to be one of the king's 64 wives) entered the royal household through such a marriage and took advantage of the semi-matriarchal slave society to rise through the ranks to become one of King Wu Ding's three consorts. She may have come from the border or from the Steppe, as suggested by the assortment of weapons in her tomb.

Fu Hao was one of three queens, the others being Fu Jing (婦妌) and Fu Shi (婦嬕). (Note: Fu Shi can also be called Fu Yi (婦睪) or Fu Gui (婦癸), and she is often referred to in the oracle bones as Bi Gui (妣癸).) Fu Jing was the primary queen while Fu Hao was the secondary queen. Fu Hao was also the mother of Prince Zu Ji. Oracle bone divinations by Nan show concern for her well-being at the time of the birth, and Wu Ding would attempt to predict the date several times, seemingly in hopes of it being auspicious.

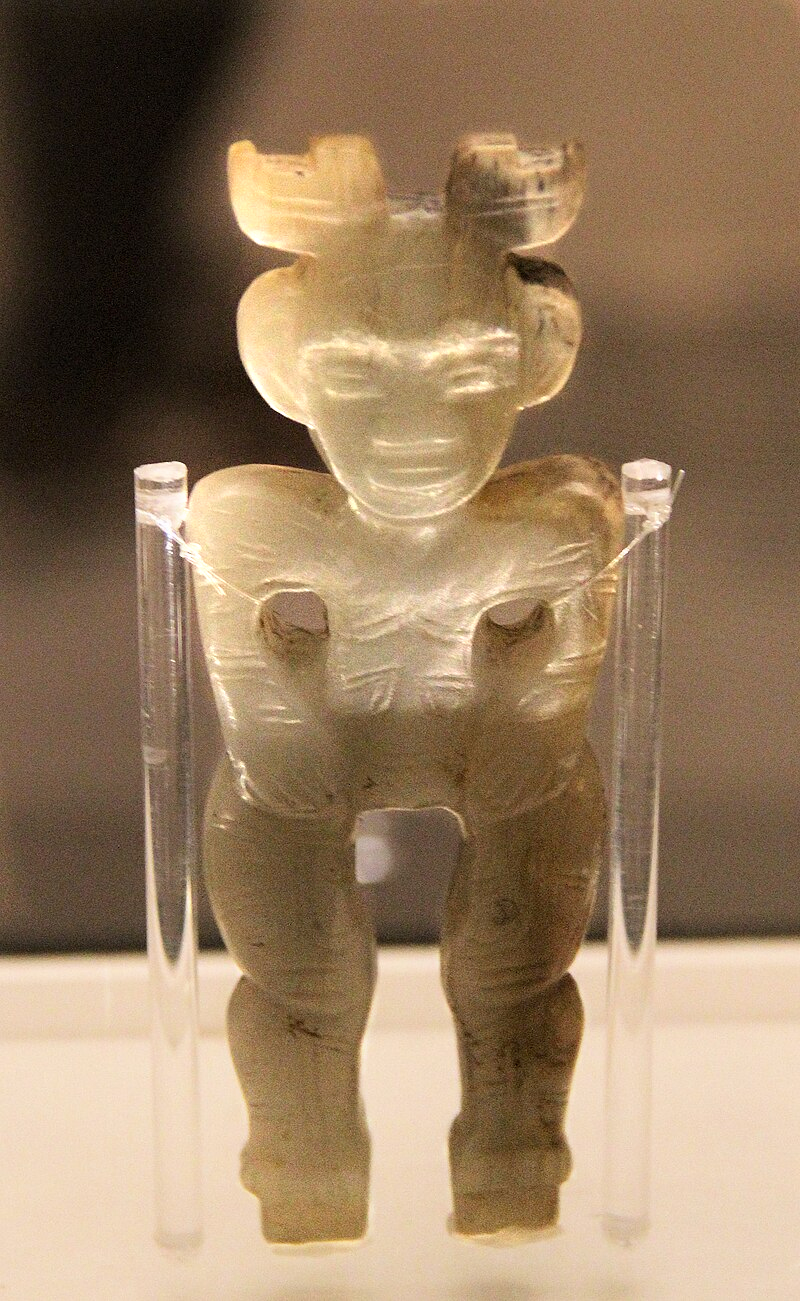
Jade human figure, tomb of Queen Fu Hao. The design is probably a derivation from the Central Asian Seima-Turbino culture.

The activities of priestess and ritual matters of China only exist in the Shang dynasty, so some evidence is vague. Since each Chinese character like Fu (婦) often has variable meanings, even with the oracle bones of Shang deciphered, it is possible that women like Fu Hao were originally priestesses instead of the king's wives; she just happened to marry the king later. That is to say, the meaning of "wife" in some contexts may actually refer to a position as priestess.

Fu Hao owned her land. According to the oracle bones, she offered the king remarkably valuable tributes many times. Although the Shang king had control over ritual matters, which constituted the most important political activity of the day, oracle bone inscriptions show that Wu Ding repeatedly instructed Fu Hao to conduct the most special rituals and to offer sacrifices to the ancestors. The Shang dynasty had two most important activities: ritual matters and battles; Lady Hao played extraordinary roles in both at that time.

== Military role ==
Fu Hao is known to modern scholars mainly from inscriptions on Shang dynasty oracle bone artifacts unearthed at Yinxu. From these inscriptions and from the presence of weapons in her tomb, it can be determined that Fu Hao was a general in charge of several military campaigns for the Shang dynasty.

In her military role, she was responsible for conquering enemies and neighbours of the Shang dynasty. The Tufang (土方) had fought against the Shang for generations until they were finally defeated by Fu Hao in a single decisive battle. Further campaigns against the neighbouring Yi, Qiang and Ba followed; the latter is particularly remembered for being the earliest recorded large-scale ambush in Chinese history. With up to 13,000 soldiers and important generals Zhi and Hou Gao serving under her, she was the most powerful Shang general of her time.

This highly unusual status is confirmed by the many weapons, including great battle-axes, unearthed in her tomb.

While Fu Hao's achievements were notable and unique, other women in this period were also active in military roles; in a similar manner Fu Jing was also thought to have served in the military based on the presence of many weapons and military equipment in her tomb. Oracle bones also revealed records of at least six hundred women participating in the military during this era.

== Tomb ==
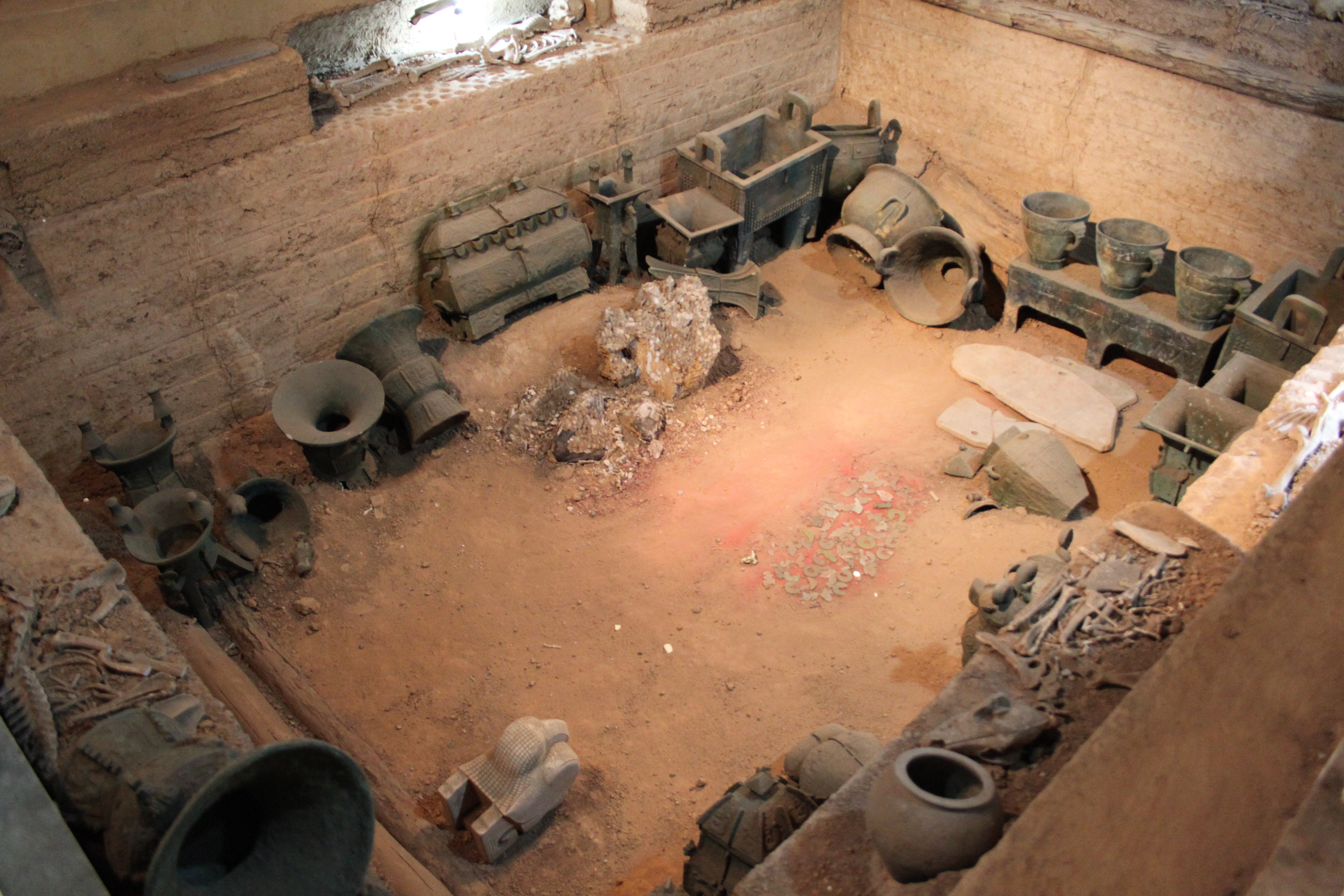
Fu Hao's tomb, museum display

Remarkably, after her death Fu Hao was buried in a tomb on her land across the river from the main royal cemetery, even though usually the royal families were buried together. She died well in advance of King Wu Ding, who constructed her tomb at his capital Yin.

Because of its location, Lady Hao's tomb is the only royal Shang tomb to have been left unnoticed and unlooted, giving unique insights into her life and the burial practices of the time. The King later made many sacrifices there in hopes of receiving her spiritual assistance in defeating the attacking Gong, who threatened to wipe out the Shang completely. This shows his great favor towards Hao and after her death, he had her married to the three greatest kings before him. The tomb was unearthed by archaeologists in 1976 and is now open to the public.

The tomb itself was only a 5.6-by-4-meter (18 by 13 ft) pit that contains a smaller, 5-meter-long (16 ft), 3.5-meter-wide (11 ft), and 1.3-meter-high (4.3 ft) wooden structure within. The inside was packed with burial sacrifices and wealth which signified Lady Hao's prodigious position.

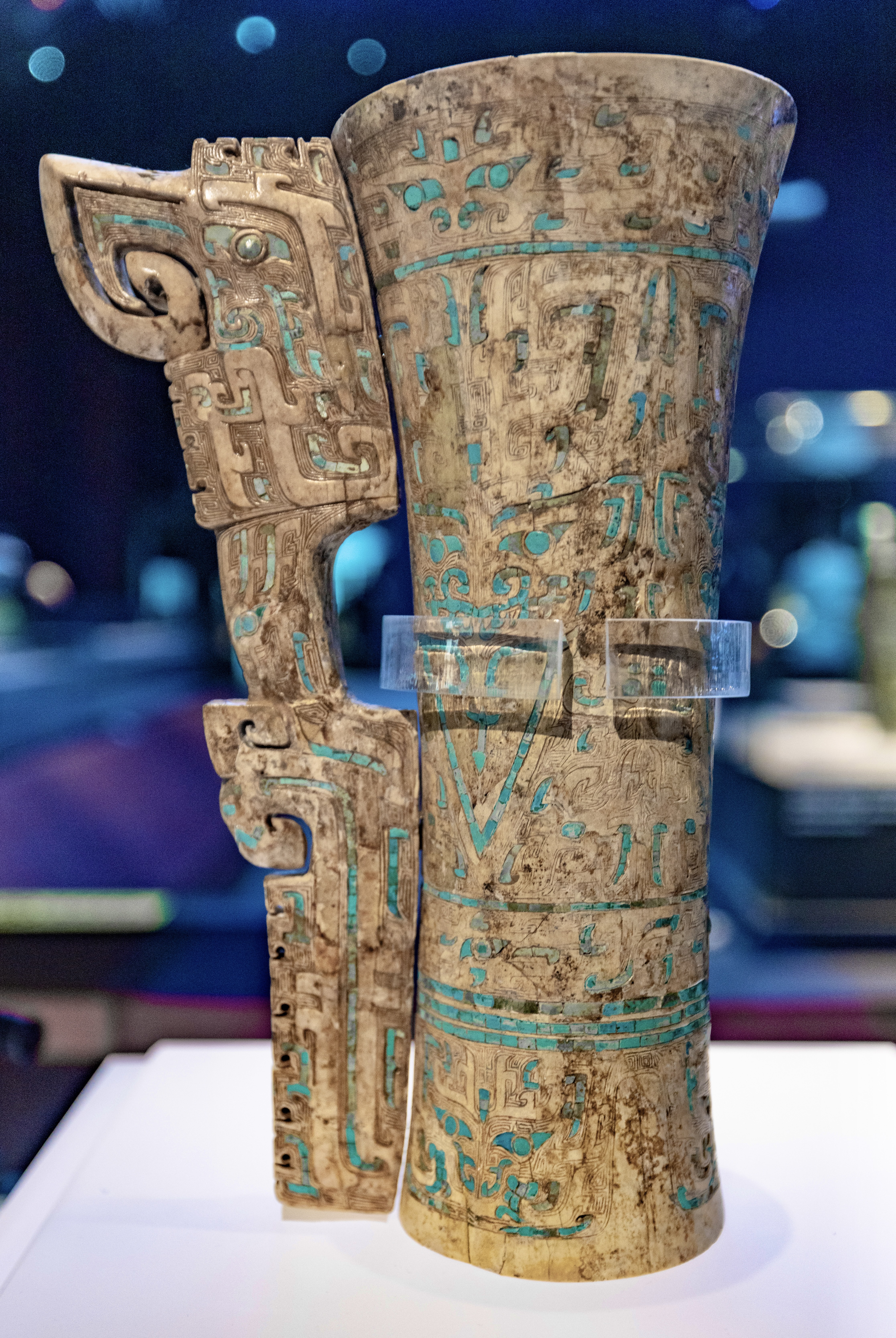
Ivory cup inlaid with turquoise, from the tomb of Fu Hao.

She was buried with a large and varied quantity of weapons signifying her important martial status, since only warriors and generals were buried with such objects. Additionally, Fu Hao was entombed with hundreds of bronze, jade, bone, and stone objects such as figurines, vessels, and mirrors, many of which were rare objects from around the kingdom. These objects are some of the best preserved from that time period. The sacrificial bronze vessels and tortoise shells inscribed prepared by Fu Hao discovered in her tomb are further evidence of her status as a high priestess and oracle caster. As was the custom during the Shang dynasty, Fu Hao was buried with 16 human sacrifices and six dogs. The remains of Fu Hao herself were found to have disintegrated.

=== Contents of tomb ===
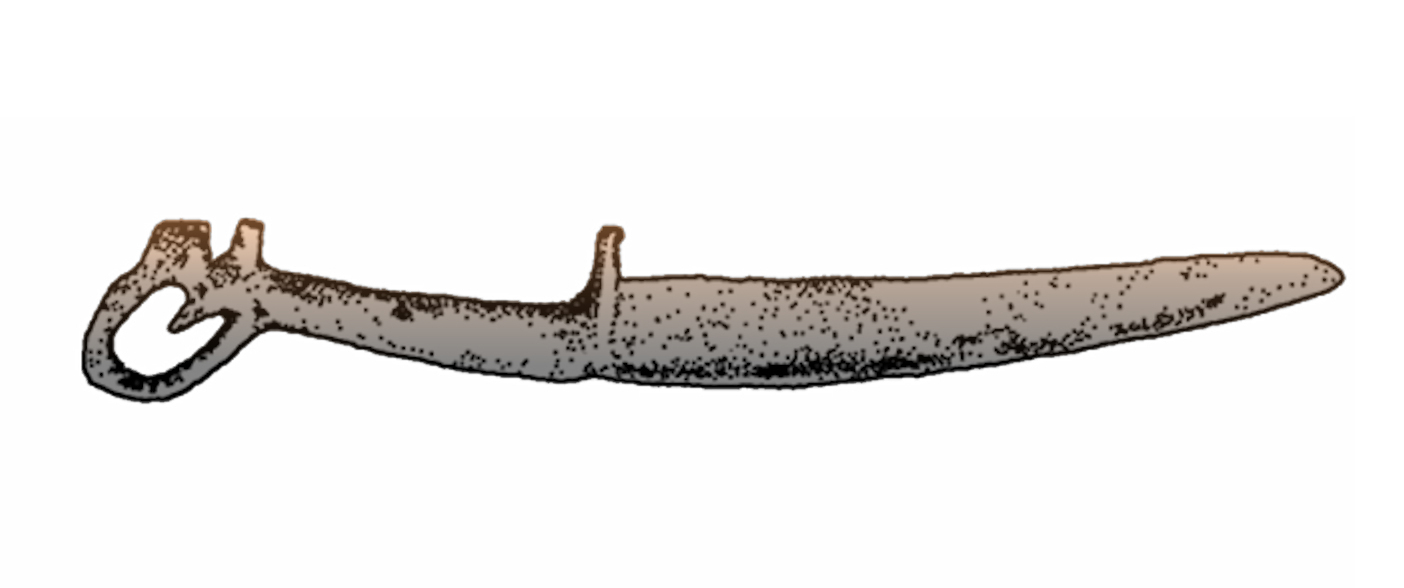
Ibex-headed knife with ring, 13th-11th century BCE, found in Fu Hao's tomb. These weapons are similar to those of the steppes.

In total, Fu Hao was buried with:

- 775 jade objects
- 564 bone objects, including nearly 500 bone hairpins and over 20 bone arrowheads
- 468 bronze objects, including 130 weapons, 23 bells, 27 knives, 4 mirrors, and 4 tigers or tiger heads
- 63 stone objects
- 5 ivory objects
- 11 pottery objects
- Over 6,880 pieces of cowry shell (Shang dynasty era currency)
- 16 human sacrifices
- 6 dogs

== See also ==
- Shang dynasty
- Tomb of Fu Hao
- Women in ancient and imperial China
- Tutankhamun
- Tomb of Tutankhamun

== Sources ==
- Bagley, Robert (1999). "Shang Dynasty Archaeology". In Loewe, Michael; Shaughnessy, Edward L. (eds.). The Cambridge History of Ancient China: From the Origins of Civilization to 221 BC. London: Cambridge University Press. pp. 124–231. doi:10.1017/CHOL9780521470308.005. ISBN 978-0-521-47030-8.
