= Wu Ding =

13th-century BC king of the Shang dynasty

Wu Ding 武丁
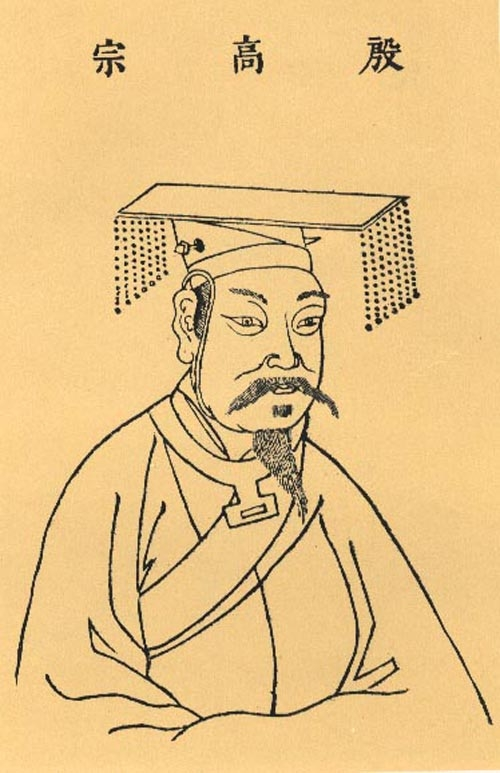
- Portrait of King Wu Ding of Shang from Sancai Tuhui

King of Shang
- Reign: c. 1250 – 1192 BC
- Predecessor: Xiao Yi
- Successor: Zu Geng
- Chancellors: Gan Pan; Fu Yue
- Born: c. first half of 13th century BC; Shang dynasty
- Died: c. 1192 BC; Yin
- Spouse: Fu Jing; Fu Hao; Fu Shi (婦睪); About 60 other concubines
- Issue: Zu Ji
Names
- Family name: Zi (子) (Note: The Shang royal "surname" Zi (子) may not have had similar connotations to the later idea of a consanguine descent group. Some scholars read it instead as a title: "Prince".); Given name: Zhao (昭)
Temple name
- Gaozong (高宗)
- Father: Xiao Yi
- Religion: Shang state religion

Wu Ding (Chinese: 武丁; died c. 1192 BC); personal name Zi Zhao (子昭), was a king of the Chinese Shang dynasty who ruled the central Yellow River valley. He is the earliest figure in Chinese history mentioned in contemporary records. The annals of the Shang dynasty compiled by later historians were once thought to be little more than legends until oracle script inscriptions on bones dating from his reign were unearthed at the ruins of his capital Yin (near modern Anyang) in 1899. Oracle bone inscriptions from his reign have been radiocarbon dated to 1254–1197 BC ±10 years, closely according with regnal dates derived by modern scholars from received texts, epigraphic evidence, and astronomical calculations.

Wu Ding's reign is characterized by a prosperous period of the late Shang state, with a wide network of allies and subordinates. The first inscriptions unequivocally recognized as Chinese appeared during his reign, together with new technological innovations. More than half of Shang inscriptions date to his reign, concerning a wide variety of deities. In classical Chinese historiography, he is often depicted as a meritorious king.

== Dating ==
Because Wu Ding is the earliest Chinese ruler whose reign is confirmed by contemporary material, dating his reign is a matter of significant historical interest.

According to the traditional chronology, he reigned from 1324 to 1266 BC. This has been shown to be an artifact of incorrect backdating due to misunderstanding of King Wen of Zhou's Mandate calendar. In the Records of the Grand Historian, Han dynasty scholar Sima Qian wrote of his reign as beginning in the year dingwei (丁未), which can be either 1333 BC or 1273 BC according to the ganzhi calendar's 60-year repetition. The Guben Zhushu Jinian ("ancient version" of Bamboo Annals) gives Wu Ding's regnal dates as 1273–1213 BC. The Cambridge History of Ancient China gives 1189 BC as the end date of his reign based on records of lunar eclipses. The Xia–Shang–Zhou Chronology Project draft release (2000), sponsored by the Chinese government and disbanded without producing a final report, gives his reign as 1250–1192 BC. Inscriptions from twenty-six oracle bone divinations of his reign have been radiocarbon dated to 1254–1197 BC ±10 years. The methodology of the radiocarbon investigators involved accepting uncritically the purported reign length of 59 years attributed to Wu Ding in the transmitted record.

== Life and reign ==
=== Early life ===
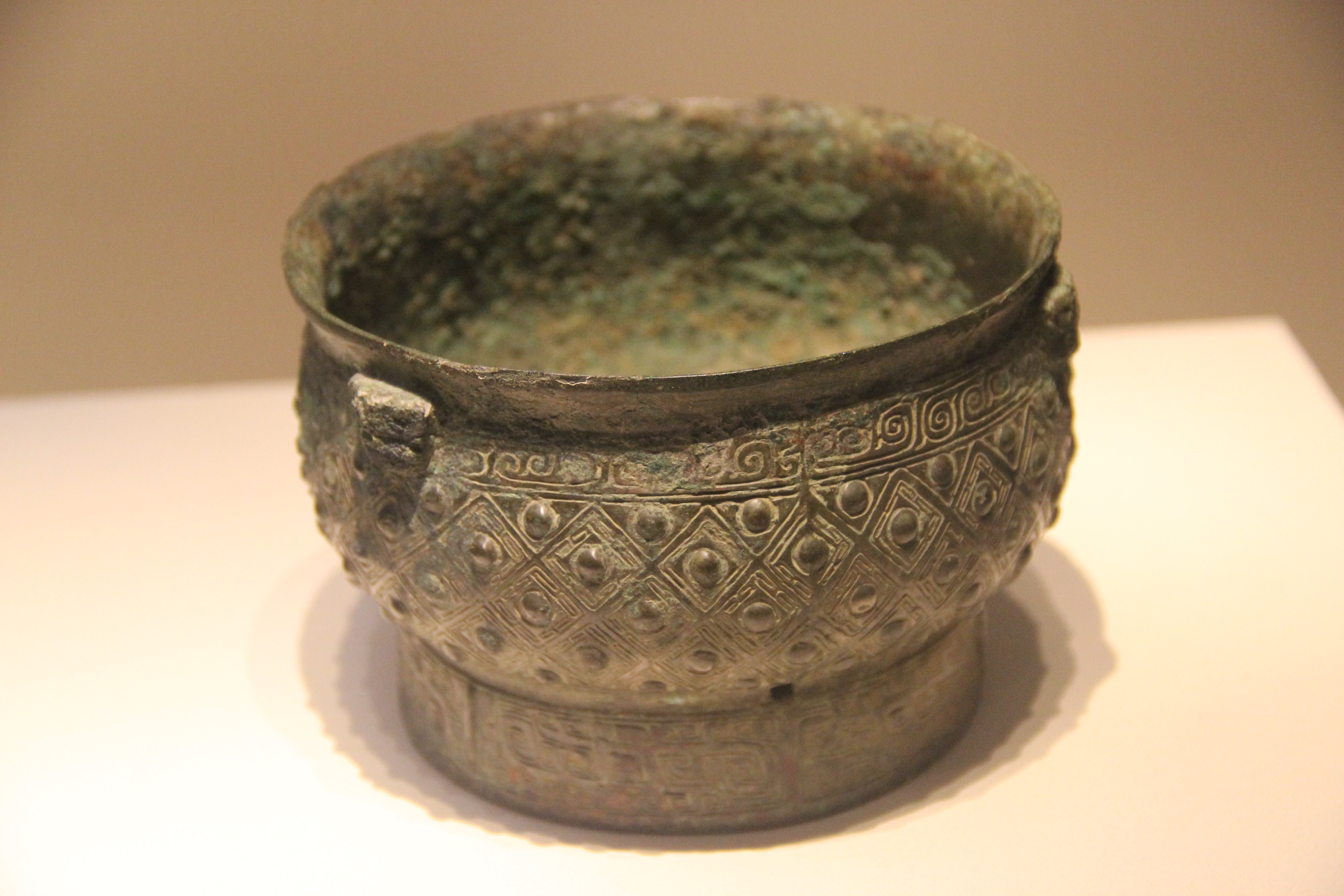
Bronze gui dated to the reign of Wu Ding.

The Shang dynasty practiced royal succession using a form of agnatic seniority, at times distributed across multiple lines of descent. In the generations preceding Wu Ding, succession had been split between the descendants of Zu Yi (祖乙) through his two sons Zu Xin (祖辛) and Qiang Jia (沃甲). This was interpreted by later historians as a weakening of an incorrectly reconstructed system of primogeniture. The Shang kings immediately preceding Wu Ding were three of his uncles (including the famous Pan Geng, who moved the capital to Huanbei) and finally his father, Xiao Yi. By the custom of the time, Xiao Yi could potentially have been succeeded by one of his second cousins from the alternate royal line. (Note: The individual whose succession Wu Ding may have preempted is mentioned in oracle bone inscriptions, although his personal name has not been positively deciphered by modern paleographers.) The fact that Xiao Yi was able to place his son on the throne despite the claims of a rival lineage may explain why Wu Ding built a new capital for the second time in living memory, as well as the transmitted tradition that he was sent away from the capital during his father's reign.

He happened to be Xiao Yi's only son, and therefore was created crown prince. The Bamboo Annals carry an entry stating that in the sixth year of his father's reign, Wu Ding was ordered to live at He (河) (ancient name for the Yellow River). Gan Pan (甘盤), a prominent minister in Xiao Yi's court, was chosen to be Zi Zhao's tutor. A late chapter in the Shangshu asserts that during these early years, he worked together with the local peasants. The times spent among the common people allowed Wu Ding to become familiar with their daily problems, which affected the ruling methods of the future king.

=== King of the Shang dynasty ===
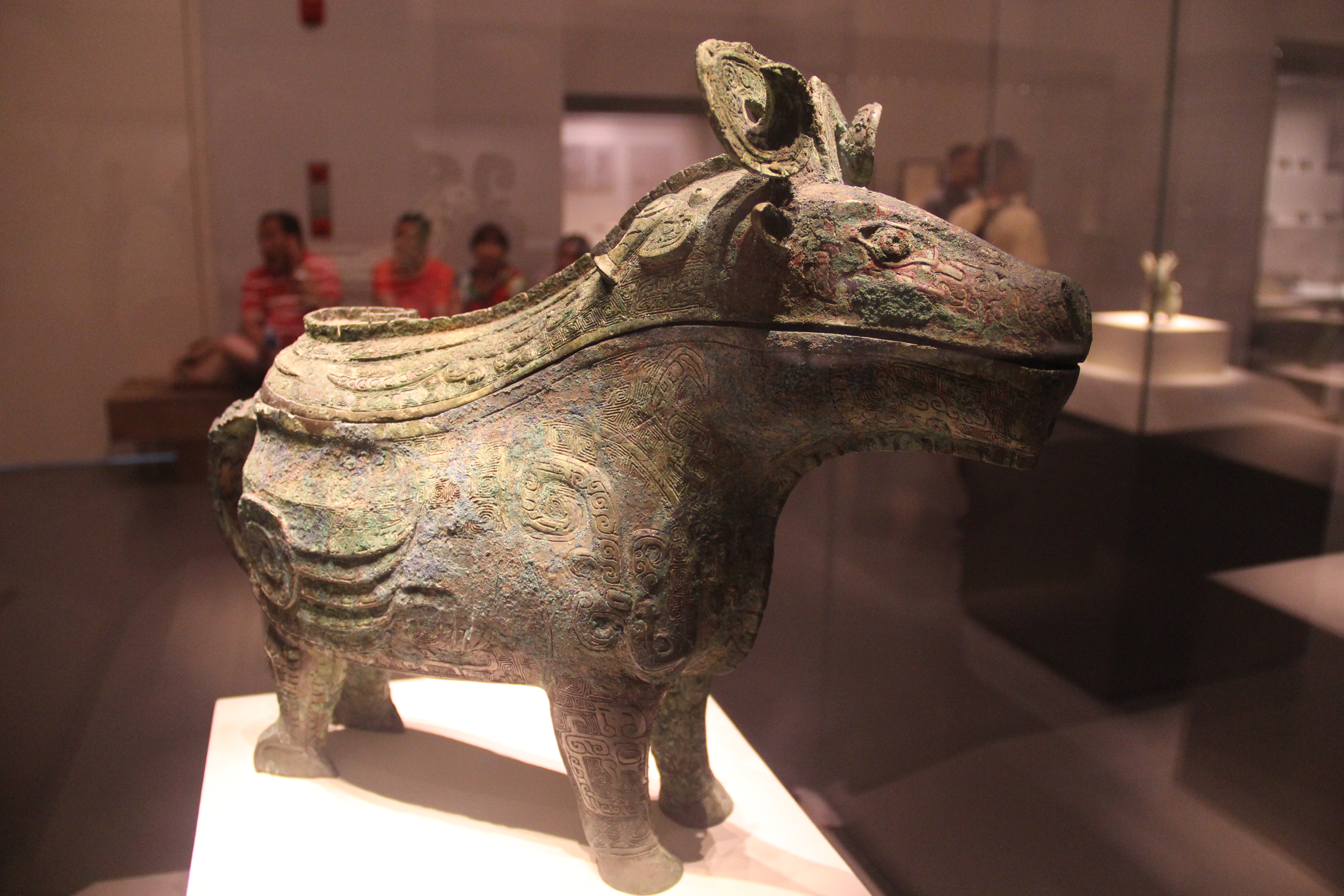
Bronze houmuxin gong from Wu Ding's reign.

In Sima Qian's Shiji he was listed as the twenty-second Shang king. Oracle bone script inscriptions unearthed at Yinxu alternatively record that he was the twenty-first Shang king. The Shiji says that he was enthroned with Yin (殷) as his capital.

Although his ruling period was characterized with wars, traditional Chinese historiography still portrayed him as a virtuous monarch who showed great care to his country. Chapter XXI of the Book of Documents describes him remaining silent in the beginning of his reign as to cultivate his virtue. According to the text, Wu Ding restrained himself from speaking even after his three-year mourning for his father's death (during which all the state affairs were discussed and managed by his court ministers) had ended:

The king passed the season of sorrow in the mourning shed for three years, and when the period of mourning was over, he (still) did not speak (to give any commands). All the ministers remonstrated with him, saying, 'Oh! him who is (the first) to apprehend we pronounce intelligent, and the intelligent man is the model for others. The Son of Heaven rules over the myriad regions, and all the officers look up to and reverence him. They are the king's words which form the commands (for them). If he do not speak, the ministers have no way to receive their orders.' On this the king made a writing, for their information, to the following effect: "As it is mine to serve as the director for the four quarters (of the kingdom), I have been afraid that my virtue is not equal to (that of my predecessors), and therefore have not spoken."

— Book of Documents IV.8 (tr. James Legge).

(By referring to this anecdote, classical historians emphasized his righteousness, filial piety and the desire to be an upright ruler like his predecessors.)

According to the Bamboo Annals, in the twenty-fifth year of his reign, his son Zu Ji (祖己) died in a remote area after being exiled.

==== Participation in Shang religious activities ====
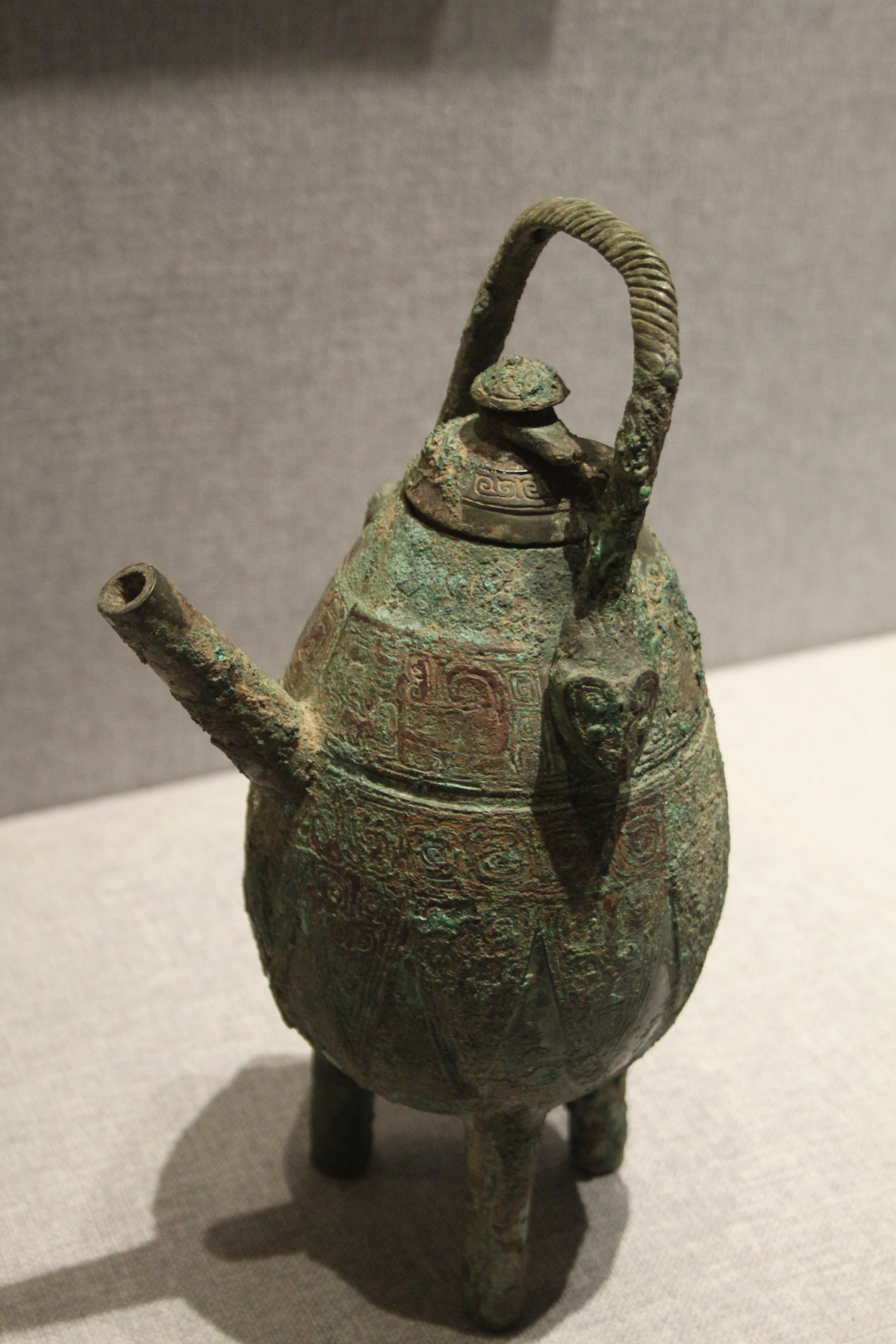
Bronze you dated to Wu Ding's reign.

Later Chinese historians when referring to him tended to emphasize his oversight of ceremonies through romanticized anecdotes. According to the Book of Documents, in the twenty-ninth year of his reign, he conducted rituals in honour of his ancestor Da Yi (大乙), the first king of the Shang dynasty, at the Royal Temple. When he saw a crowing pheasant on one of the ceremonial bronze vessels, he became frightened and considered it an ominous omen. Zu Ji, who was accompanying his father during the rituals, is said to have wanted to advocate religious modifications. Following this thought, Zu decided to discuss the omen with his father. He was quoted as saying:

In its inspection of men below, Heaven's first consideration is of their righteousness, and it bestows on them (accordingly) length of years or the contrary [...] our Majesty's business is to care reverently for the people. And all (your ancestors) were the heirs of the kingdom by the gift of Heaven;−−in attending to the sacrifices (to them), be not so excessive in those to your father.

— Book of Documents, "Day of the Supplementary Sacrifice of Gaozong", trans. James Legge

Wu Ding was actively involved in divination and sacrifice. The king, with the assistance of his priests, was responsible for a large proportion of oracle bone divinations found at Yin. Wu Ding specifically divined about his queen, both when she was alive and after her departure. In particular, one inscription on Fu Hao's being pregnant said that the conception was "inauspicious" (that the child was a girl). Aside from pregnancy, he also divined on her health, prosperity, as well as praying for her in the afterlife. (He is believed to have married her three more times to his ancestors, since he believed they would act as her guardians after death). He also asked divinatory questions about human sacrifice as well as warfare. He also seemed to be in awe of his ancestors, especially his second uncle Pan Geng. He regularly wrote questions concerning weather, agricultural issues for his deceased predecessors, and he held a thought that they were capable of indirectly supporting his army in battles. Moreover, Pan Geng was specifically perceived to be involved in his nephew's health. One example based on contemporary records is a reconstructed ceremony by Keightley, which aimed to seek improvement for Wu's dental problems. In the ritual, Wu Ding offered one dog and one sheep to Pan Geng and tried to convince him to treat his toothache.

Oracle bones often include the names of diviners. Wu Ding divined exceptionally many times; numerous bone texts feature the king himself as the chief diviner. He interpreted the cracks on oracle bones to predict future events, of which four notable examples are:

- Crack-making divination on the day guiwei: Wu Ding's assistants predicted no disaster, but he divined that the near future would be misfortune. It is purportedly said that six days after, a relative of Wu Ding died. The relative was possibly Zu Ji, although the texts do not specify his identity. He allegedly died on wuzi day of the First Month.
- Another time, he interpreted the signs as negative. It is said that eight days later, the Sun was covered by large clouds, and a rainbow appeared in the Yellow River.
- Divinations on wars and territorial defense: on the day guisi, Wu Ding predicted the opposite future from his diviners that confrontational polities were going to launch attacks on his border. On the day dingyou, it is believed that bad news came from the West from a trusted regional lord, Guo. The lord reported that Tu Fang had attacked the territory and destroyed two towns, and another tribe had taken over the kingdom's western fields. However, this is somewhat contradictory, since Tu Fang supposedly mobilized its men from the east, contrary to their location northwest of Yin.
- A prediction of disasters gave the outcome that one of Wu Ding's accompanying ministers would fall off his chariot during a hunting expedition. The misfortune occurred on jiawu day, when the king was seeking for a rhinoceros. Two people, one of his xiaochen (petty ministers) and his child fell off their chariots.

The divinations of the scribes often included the prediction of fortune in a certain period (usually a Shang week). An ox scapula records the divinations by Zheng (爭), one of the Bīn (賓) group of diviners serving Wu Ding. On the piece of bone, four separated divinations were carved (either by the king or Zheng himself):

- On the top: 卜，☐，貞[旬]亡𡆥。"... divined: In the next ten days (week), there will be no disasters."
- On the left: 癸卯卜，爭，貞旬亡𡆥。甲辰☐大掫風，之曰皿，乙巳[疛]𰙫(止幸)☐五人。五月在[𦎧]。 "guǐmǎo (day 40) Zheng divined: in the next ten days there will be no disasters. jiǎchén (day 41) ... strong gale, evening cleaved to yǐsì (day 42), captured ... five people. Fifth month, in Dun."
  Ox scapula recording divinations by Zhēng 爭 in the reign of King Wu Ding
- On the middle: 癸丑卜，爭，貞旬亡𡆥。王(占)曰：有祟，有夢。甲寅，允有來艱。左告曰：有往芻自(皿)，十人又二。 "guǐchǒu (day 50) Zheng divined: in the next ten days there will be no disasters." The character 王 (king) indicates the personal involvement of Wu Ding in this specific divination. Wu Ding added to Zheng's conclusion that there would be ominous spirits, and on the day jiayin there would be obstacles.
- On the right: 癸丑卜，爭，貞旬亡𡆥。三日乙卯[有](壴女)艱，單邑豊[尿]于彔......丁已貍子豊尿......鬼亦得疾。 "guǐchǒu (day 50) Zheng divined: in the next ten days there will be no disasters. Third day, yǐmǎo (day 52) ... dīngsì (day 54) ... Gui will also have sickness."

Wu Ding's family also played a part in religious practice. They appeared to have been granted their own power as priests, and some oracle texts carved by the assistants might have been made in the service of the princes. The majority (70%) of oracle characters date back to Wu Ding's reign, which indicates his emphasis on religion.

=== First chancellor Gan Pan ===
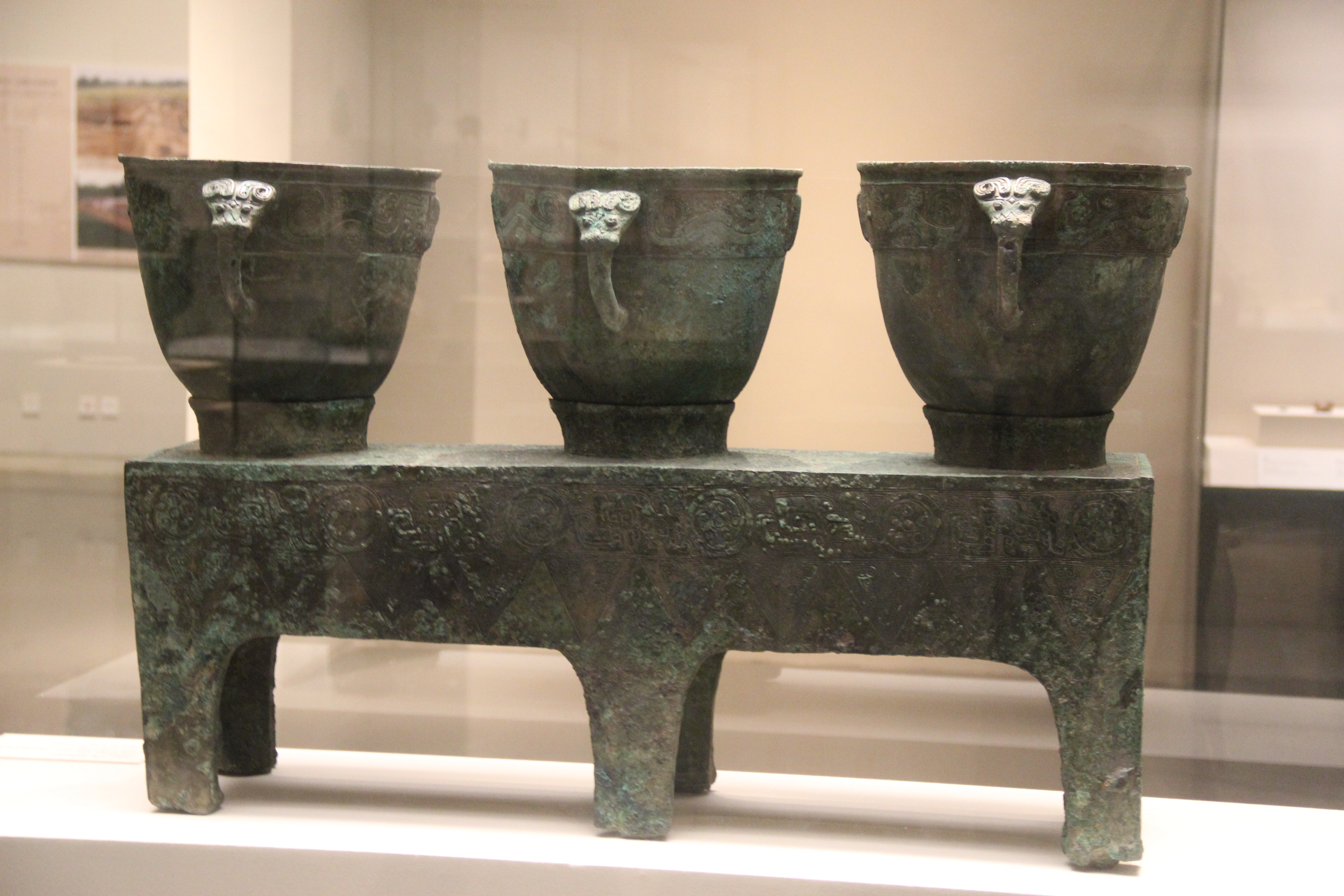
Triple yan steamer from Wu Ding's reign.

It is believed that two individuals were chosen as administrative chancellors by this king. Several texts state that after becoming king, Wu Ding appointed his former tutor, Gan Pan (甘盘), as the chief minister at his court. Gan began to arrange the military formations of the country while also acting as an adviser to the new ruler. In the work "Shangshu Zhengyi", Kong Anguo mentioned Gan Pan as an exemplary minister that could be compared with Yi Yin. The Book of Documents makes the same comparison in its chapter on the Duke of Shao, who would act as one of the Three Regents under King Cheng of Zhou approximately 250 years after Gan Pan. In the text, the Duke of Zhou is quoted as delivering a lesson about Shang meritorious officials that ought to be viewed as models of loyal and capable ministers:

The duke said, 'Prince Shih (i.e. Duke of Shao), I have heard that aforetime, when Tang the Successful had received the appointment (to the throne), he had with him Yi Yin, making his virtue like that of great Heaven; that Tai Jia had (the same Yi Yin)" [...] "through whom his virtue was made to affect God, and Wuxian who regulated the royal House" [...] "and that Wu-Ting had Kan Pan (Gan Pan). These ministers carried out their principles, and displayed their merits, preserving and regulating the dynasty of Yin, so that, while its ceremonies lasted, (those sovereigns), when deceased, were assessors to Heaven, and its duration extended over many years.

— Book of Documents V.16 (tr. James Legge)

=== Second chancellor Fu Yue ===
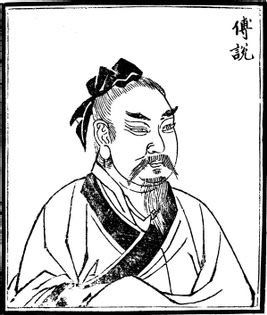
Fu Yue, the second Chancellor of Wu Ding. He is believed to be identical to Hou Que, whose name was presented in oracle bones.

According to Kong Anguo's source, Gan Pan died shortly after Wu Ding inherited the throne. After his death, the chancellor position was filled by Fu Yue (傅說) (alternatively called Fu Shuo). The Records of the Grand Historian and the Shangshu contain paragraphs mentioning the story of Wu Ding encountering Fu Yue. According to the source, Wu Ding was informed by Heaven that he would receive a man named "Yue" who would assist him in governing the country. After waking up, he consulted his court but no one recognized the man. Therefore, he produced a painting of the man from his memory and dispatched his troops to seek for the person. Yue was found as a worker on a defensive construction; his appearance was said to perfectly match the description of the desired person. Seeing that Yue was intelligent and learned, Wu Ding appointed him as his chancellor and gave him the surname "Fu".

It is hinted by the oracle bones that Fu Yue was potentially a historical person. Based on information on the oracle bones, historians have constructed a list of ten court officials at the time of Wu Ding's reign: Gan Pan, Hou Que, Wangcheng, Jun He, Jichen, Jian, Qin Dian, Xi Li Zhi, Cang Hou Hu, Hou Gao. It is thought that Fu Yue is likely to be identical to Hou Que: in fact, several oracle bones describing Hou Que handling affairs that were very similar to those of Fu Yue mentioned in the Tsinghua Bamboo Slips as well as other texts. Hou Que, similar to the romanticized Fu Yue, was an important assistant to Wu Ding. The list, however, remains controversial because necessary information about many of the ten individuals included is yet to be found.

=== Regional lords ===
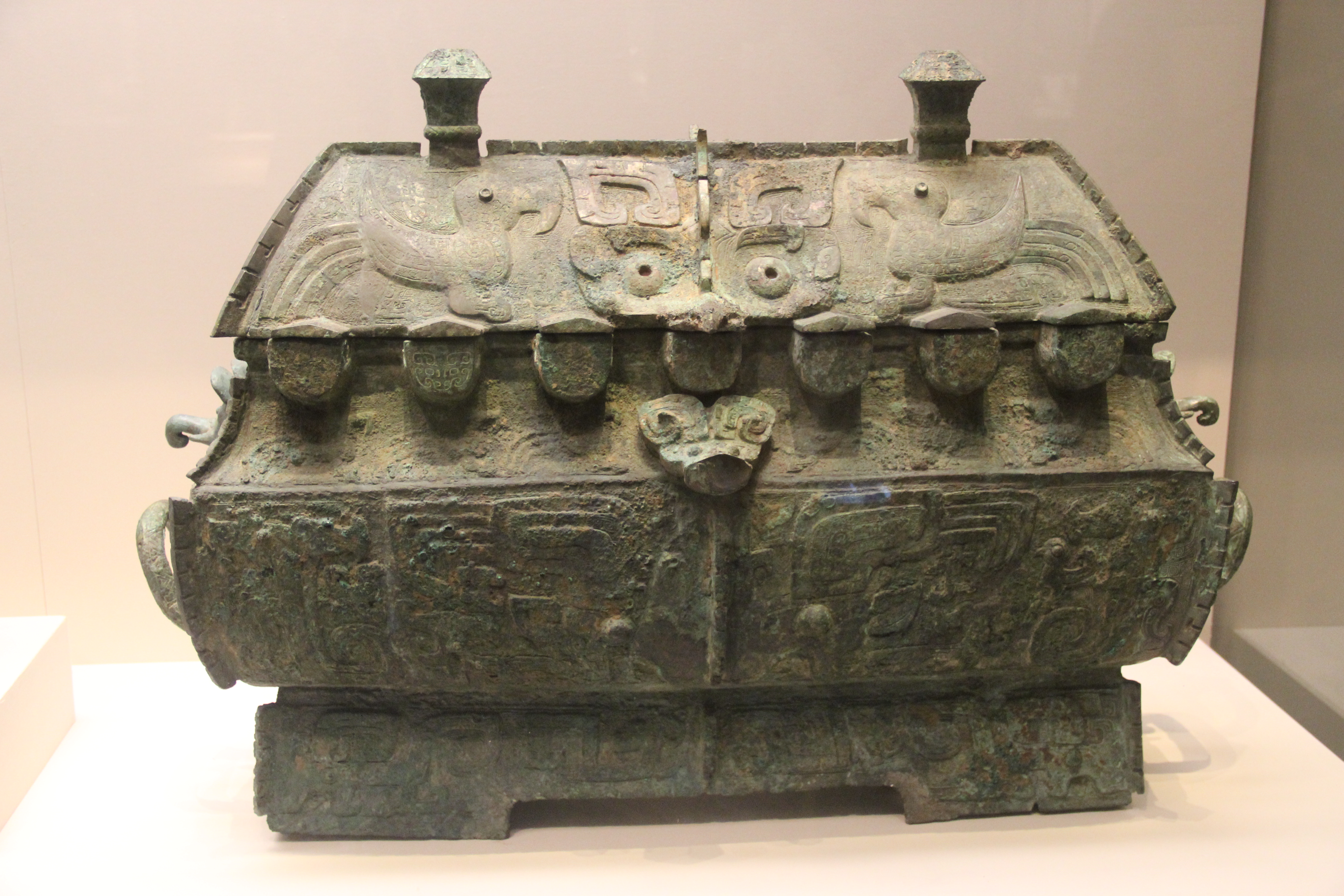
Bronze double fangyi dated to Wu Ding's reign.

As Wu Ding expanded his realm widely, he eventually ruled a much larger area than that of his ancestors. However, the king's control of regions that were farther from Yin was practically nominal. Ruling from modern-day Anyang, the monarch was unable to protect the most vulnerable lands of his state. The primitive conditions of transportation also proved an obstacle to his ability to immediately respond to urgent situations in remote lands. These logistical realities led him to delegate power to others. He divided the country into portions which were ruled as autonomous realms. Unlike the central governing body which only included a certain number of people who controlled court affairs and central military, regional administration was performed by numerous local lords of varied backgrounds. They were given personal lands and expected to give tributes, portions of harvest, and military support to the Shang monarch, a practice similar to the system used by later dynastic regimes. Obedient lords were accepted as trustworthy allies of the central government and were given nobility titles. A notable chief was Guo of Zhi, mentioned several times in contemporary texts; he was apparently an ally and a chief of Wu Ding's distant lands. In two inscriptions, Guo of Zhi is recorded to have merged his local troops into the central army, which-at that time commanded by Wu-was mobilizing for battle.

== Military campaigns ==
=== Military structure and equipment ===
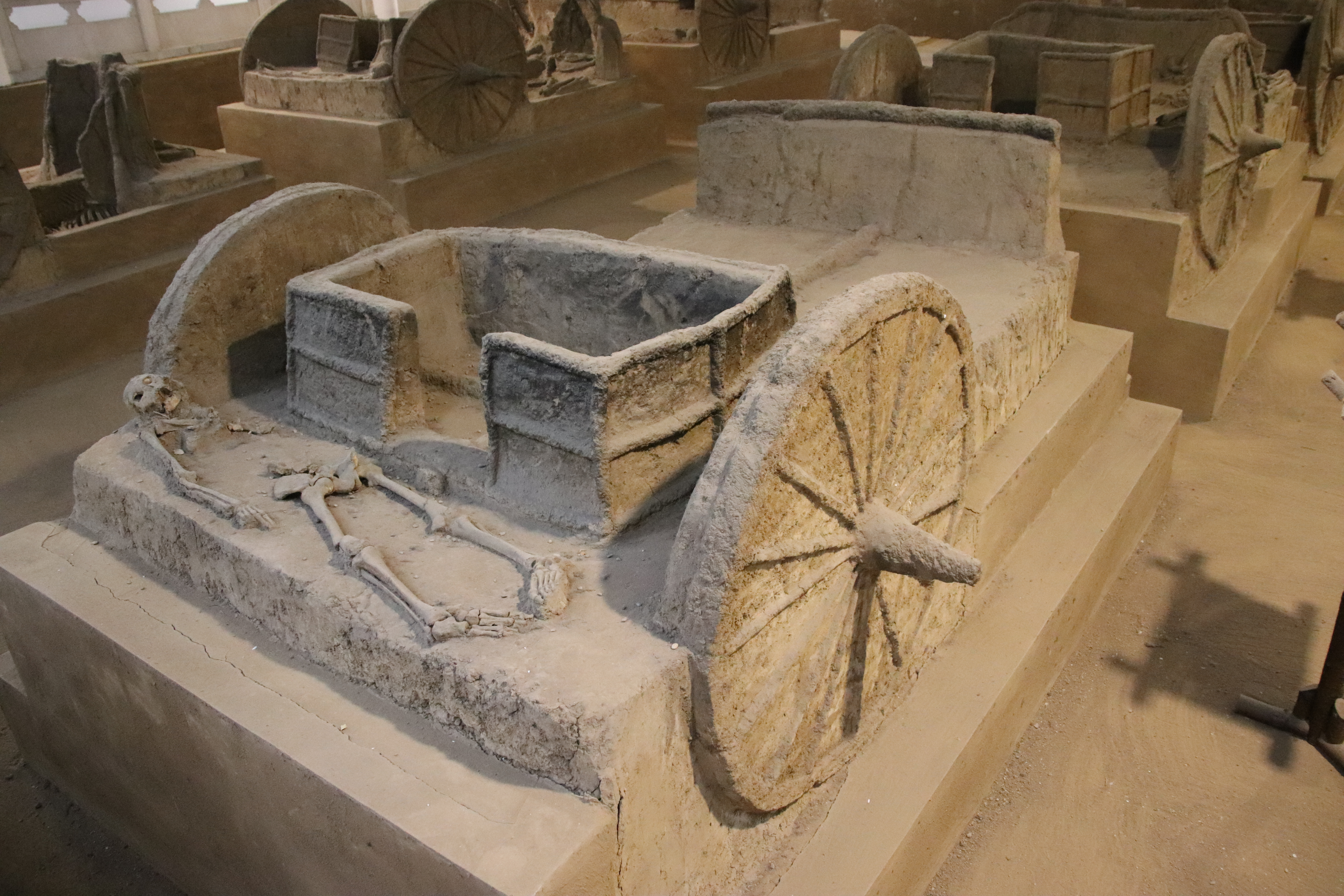
The Shang chariot at Yinxu.

Although little is known about military arrangements during the king's reign, the armies contributed significantly to the kingdom's warfare and defense. The central government maintained three regiments: zhongshi (中師), zuoshi (左師), and youshi (右師). These were used to defend the royal domain as well as secure the new territories gained. In order to defend border regions, the royal troops (wangshi 王師, woshi 我師) were sent and garrisoned in remote regions. Wu Ding's court also had military conscription, reserved for dangerous times. These conscripts were called "deng" (登) or "zheng" (征), and were trained to react to urgent situations such as enemies' attack of the capital. However, such conscriptions were still rare during the Shang dynasty, and records of them are few. The royal force numbered thousands and were militarily trained through royal hunts. The royal servants were able to be promoted to official positions by taking part in battles.

The Shang armed forces employed a wide range of weapons and supporting equipment. Troops had both bone and bronze weapons, including máo (矛) spears, yuè (鉞) pole-axes, gē (戈) pole-based dagger-axes, and composite bows. At the time of Wu Ding, bronze weapons became widely distributed in the kingdom, both in the capital and provincial regions; in the preceding periods, they appeared in smaller numbers. Weapons found in Shang royal tombs reveal advanced bronze metallurgy that makes them more useful as weapons than in the reigns of previous rulers. Soldiers also possessed armor, such as bronze and leather helmets. The presence of chariots in Wu Ding's period gave the forces an advantage over other chiefdoms and tribes. According to literary sources, a chariot was drawn by more than one horse, and accompanied three soldiers with swords, halberds, and bows.

=== Major expansions ===
Approximate territorial extent of Shang kingdom. However, this is not the limit of its dominance as neighboring regions include its dependent polities, tributary states and areas under influence. The "true" area under control of the dynasty expanded more than twice as large as the map shows.

Oracle bone inscriptions dating back to Wu Ding mention a wide range of unstable connections with tribes and chiefdoms, generally referred to as fang (方). Oracle bone scripts record that the Shang dynasty maintained contact with Guifang (鬼方), a chiefdom northwest of Yin that was sometimes interpreted as "unfriendly" to the central region. According to the Bamboo Annals, in the thirty-second year of Wu's reign, he sent troops to fight Guifang, stationing the army at Jing (荊). After three years of fighting, he conquered it and annexed it into the kingdom, turning Guifang into his supporters in expeditions against other foes.

In the eastern neighboring regions, the state of Dapeng (大彭) had been a vassal of the Shang dynasty since the early 14th century BC and was a notable autonomous region of the kingdom. According to traditional texts, the first ruler of Dapeng was given the title of hou by Wu Ding's ancestors. During the previous kings' reign, the region is recorded to have maintained a relationship with Shang through occasional tribute. However, during Wu Ding's period, Dapeng began to show hostility towards the suzerainty held by the Shang king. In the forty-third year of his reign (c. 1200 BC), Wu Ding waged war on Dapeng and annexed the territory into the kingdom. Seven years later, his army went on to conquer Tunwei (豕韋).

=== Relations with Predynastic Zhou ===
During Wu Ding's reign, the western regions (west of the western "fang" tribes) were inhabited by the Ji clan, the predecessors of the Zhou dynasty. The center of their chiefdom was Bin (in modern Xunyi County) for thousands of years, located very far from Wu Ding's seat in Yin. It was not fully brought under Shang suzerainty, but instead maintained a loose connection with the Shang kings. Wu Ding's reign had considerably more inscriptions about Predynastic Zhou than later periods, concerning Zhou soldiers' welfare and inquiries about Zhou hunts. On the other hand, Wu Ding never visited Zhou territory to tour or hunt. He also did not order Zhou manpower to aid Shang's public construction works and wars. Furthermore, despite his concerns about the Zhou people's prosperity, he made no divinations about whether their harvests were successful.

Predynastic Zhou does not appear to have participated in any of Wu Ding's campaigns of conquest, and they also did not show discontent with the court – oracle bones dating to Wu Ding's reign do not show any signs of military conflicts between the Zhou chiefdom and the court. However, after 1200 BC and the reign of Wu Ding, the Ji clan leaders began to involve themselves more in their relationship with the last Shang kings.

=== Southern wars ===
Wu Ding's campaigns in the southern areas included his conflict with the Hufang (虎方), a Jingman tribe located between the Han River Basin and the Huai River Basin. During his reign, the general and official Wangcheng (望乘) was ordered to lead a force to engage with the Hufang. The army arrived at the bank of the Yangtze River, between the modern cities of Suizhou and Jingshan in Hubei, and launched an offense via Gui, which was in modern Zigui County. The Hufang tribe, upon being attacked, surrendered to Wangcheng without much resistance. Subsequently, their land was merged into the Shang's southern territory.

Oracle bone inscriptions rarely mention a southern polity that was hostile to Wu Ding. He expanded his rule further south than his predecessors had done. Several tribes submitted themselves under Shang rule and acted as supporting forces in its northwestern wars.

Roughly seventy-five percent of human sacrifices of Shang dynasty excavated at Yinxu date to Wu Ding's reign. This indicates his great military successes, since Shang human sacrifices consisted mostly of prisoners of war. Since the Shang dynasty practiced slavery, the captured peoples that were not executed for sacrificial ceremonies were shown little mercy and forced to work for the king. For example, the Qiang slaves were expected to prepare oracle bones for diviners.

=== War with other peoples ===
The Shang dynasty was contemporary to civilization in parts of Sichuan, located at a considerable distance from major Shang cities like Yin and Zhengzhou. Traditional histories say that the region was home to two states, Ba and Shu. Ba was an ancient confederation of tribes, and its history extended back to the middle of the 2nd millennium BC. Ba recorded conflict with Wu Ding's kingdom around the 13th century BC. The Shang oracle bones document a division of Shang army attacking Ba. The Shang forces, numbered up to thirteen thousand, were led by Xi Li Zhi and Hou Gao, under the command of Fu Hao. One of the battles with Ba was a large-scale ambush by the Shang, the first ambush ever recorded in Chinese history. However, Ba seemed to be mostly unaffected by Wu Ding's influence, and it continued to be independent after his wars, as it continued to be an independent state into the Zhou period.

== Significant events ==
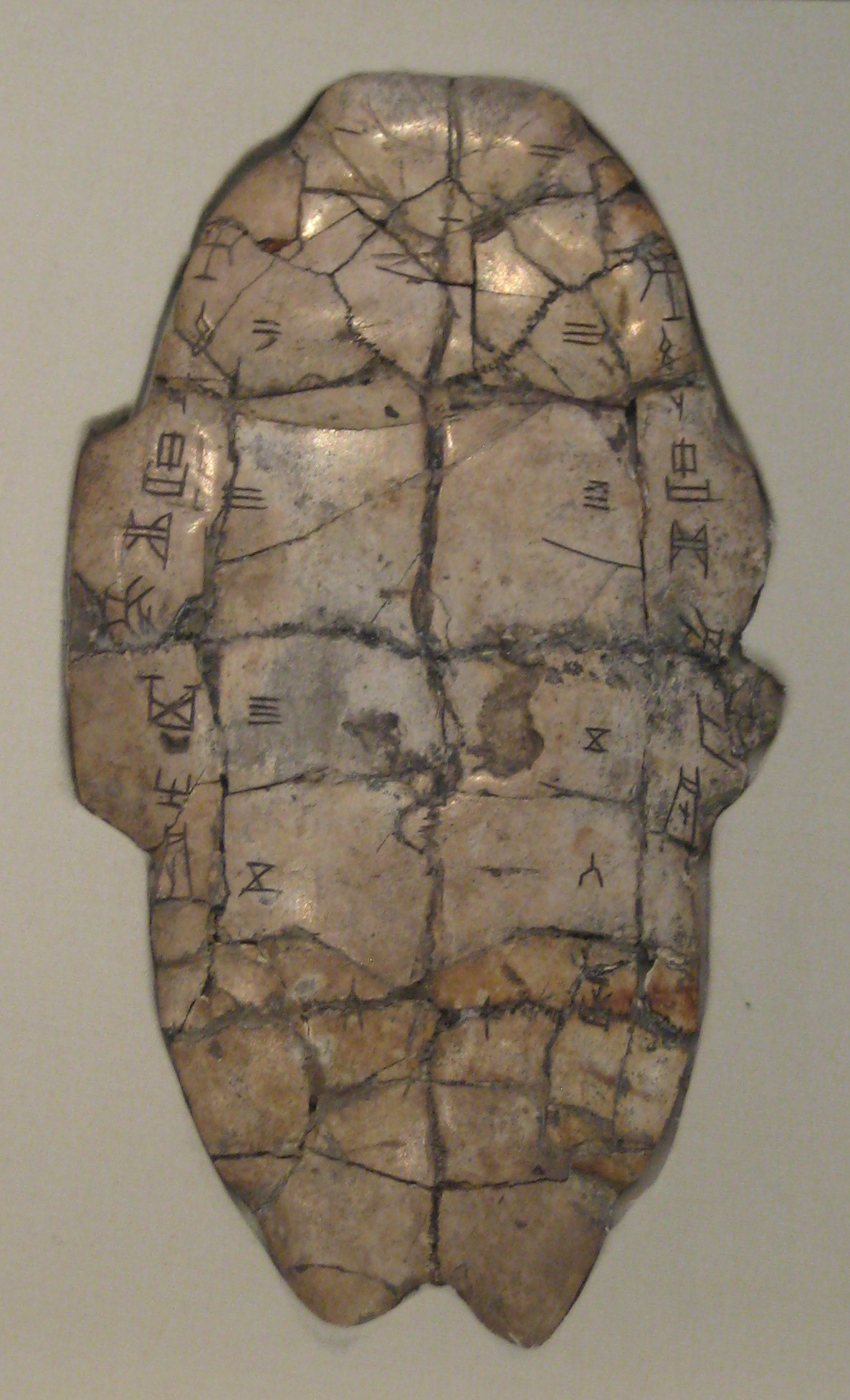
Tortoise plastron with divination inscription dating to the reign of King Wu Ding

The earliest version of Chinese writing, oracle bone script (甲骨文; jiaguwen), found on tortoise plastrons and ox scapulae, was unearthed at the royal tombs in Yinxu. Wu Ding was the earliest monarch to rule from that Shang capital. The contents are divinatory questions on war, human sacrifice, and national economy. The scripts have been found to have almost all principles of modern Chinese writing, which suggests a previous period of development. Another major type of Shang writing, bronze inscriptions ("jinwen" 金文), also came into use at the same time as their bone counterpart. Shang bronze script was used to a smaller extent than oracle scripts, especially in Wu Ding's reign when only a few characters were cast on ceremonial vessels. They often contain information about family names and personal names of the individual being honored.

Wu Ding's reign is the latest point at which chariots could have entered China. They were acquired as a mature technology through interactions with nomadic tribes in Central Asia and the Northern Steppe (most likely a branch of the Proto-Indo-European peoples), and used for royal hunts and military command. Contemporary oracle bone inscriptions of the character 車 depict a chariot-like two wheeled vehicle with a single pole for the attachment of horses. Many Shang chariots were eventually interred with royal family members in tombs. The Shang chariots, despite their limited tactical use in combat, remain prevalent throughout the Shang period and early Zhou era.

Astronomy in China traces its origin back to Wu Ding's time. Since the 13th century BC, numerous stars (that were later categorized) were recorded on oracle bones at Anyang. The system of "xiu" (宿, lit."mansion") that played an important role in ancient astronomy also appeared during his reign. It is commonly thought that the earliest examples of a calendar also appeared along with astronomy. The Shang calendar, which served to organize days, appeared from the start of literacy. It arranges ten days into a week, a feature that was used by the royal house to schedule sacrifices. The use of calendars later gained a religious or magical purpose.

Bronze technology underwent significant changes starting from the late Shang era, beginning with the reign of Wu Ding. Quantity and quality of the products increased drastically. The most notable uses of them were war uses and tomb furnishings; the latter reflects a parallel between advancement in bronze weaponry and the sociopolitical development seen from Wu Ding's reign onward. Large numbers of bronze weapons were excavated in tombs, demonstrating the affluence and wealth of the nobility. In terms of warfare, high-quality bronzemaking contributed greatly to Wu Ding's victories over his rivals, which enabled him to extend his realm in both influence and land area. Along with the bronze products, the writing that was inscribed on them provides insights into the "artisan" class who made the bronze. Bronze scripts indicate that they enjoyed certain privileges, and had a defined occupation that was separate from the common people.

== Women in government ==
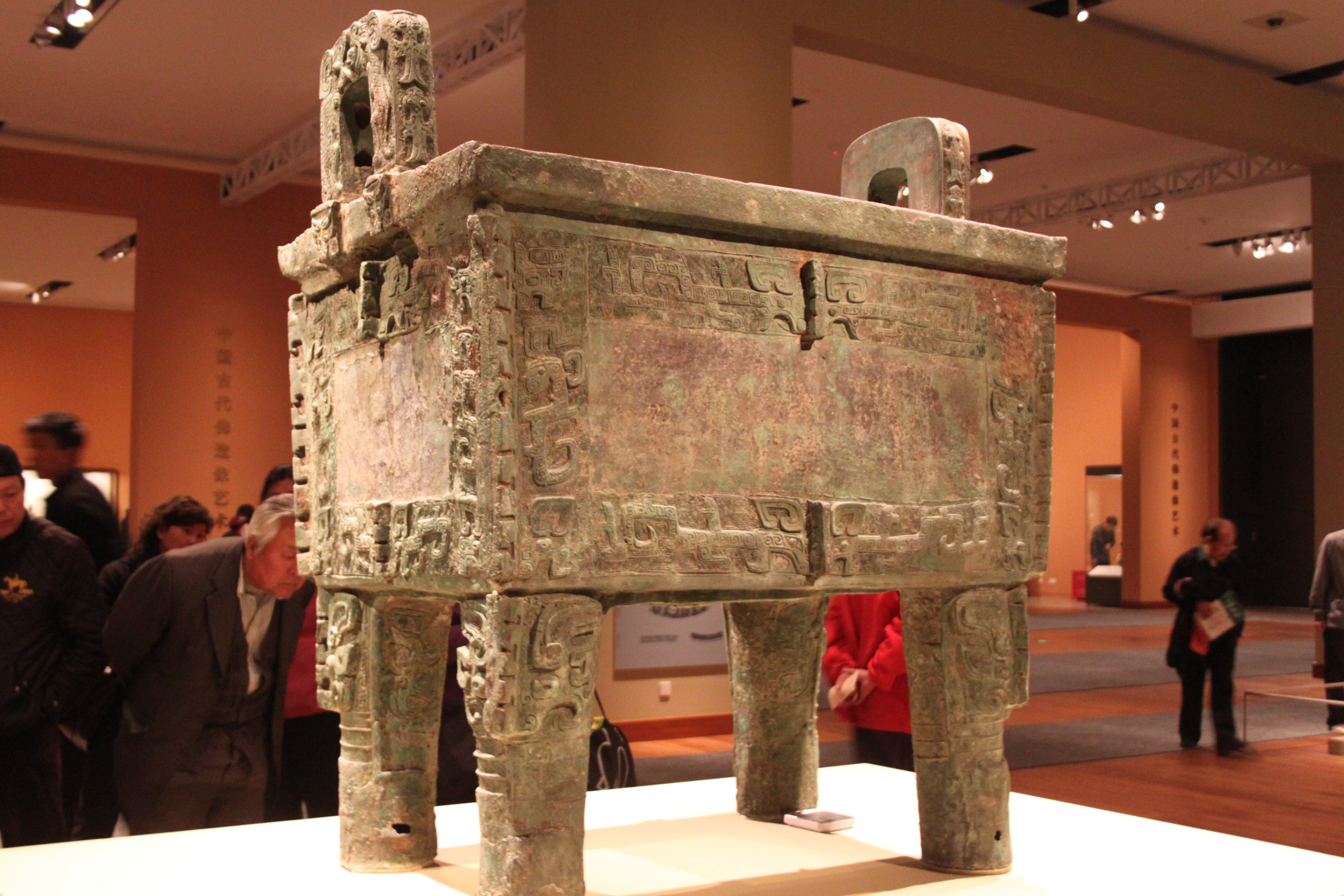
The Houmuwu ding dedicated to Fu Jing.

At the time of Wu Ding's accession to the throne, women had a greater role to play in the exercise of official power than in subsequent Chinese culture. This is mainly due to the fact that the Shang were not influenced by Confucian ideologies, which only appeared 700 years after Wu Ding, although some later cultural practices were already in place during the Shang. The most prominent women in the Shang dynasty lived during Wu Ding's rule. Most of them acquired power through marriage to the king. Wu Ding's spouses participated in warfare and divination, worshipping the Shang celestial ancestor Shangdi (上帝), along with participating in managing the kingdom's agricultural economy.

=== Fu Hao ===
Fu Hao, the queen consort, was recorded in oracle bones as a renowned military commander. Being skilled in warfare, she was trusted by her husband and was appointed a general. She held various campaigns against several groups in the west of Shang territory. At its peak, the forces of Fu Hao numbered over 13,000 troops, headed by herself and subordinate generals. The force helped the Shang dynasty conquer many opposing tribes to further expand their territory.

Although Fu Hao raised and commanded troops on behalf of Wu Ding, she did not have her own army or independent base of power like a vassal chieftain might. Nevertheless, she was Wu Ding's favorite consort, being mentioned the most among the large number of his wives. Fu Hao's military operations were dictated by divinatory inquiries, which decided her army's mobilization. For example, a divination says: Cheng divined: "Fu Hao shall follow Guo of Zhi to attack the enemy. The King shall attack Zhonglu from the East to where Fu Hao shall be." Another text reads: "The King should not order Fu Hao to follow Guo, [because] we will not perhaps receive enough support."

Along with warfare, it is known that the queen also played a religious role as a priestess. She was allowed to take part in ceremonies, sacrifices, and divination with Wu Ding's diviners. She was involved in the practice of human sacrifice, as the humans killed were often prisoners taken from her opponents. Some oracle bones contain graphics depicting her organizing human sacrifices to the ancestors. As a priestess, she was one of very few women in Shang China who was fully literate. Many paragraphs on oracle bones feature her as the diviner.

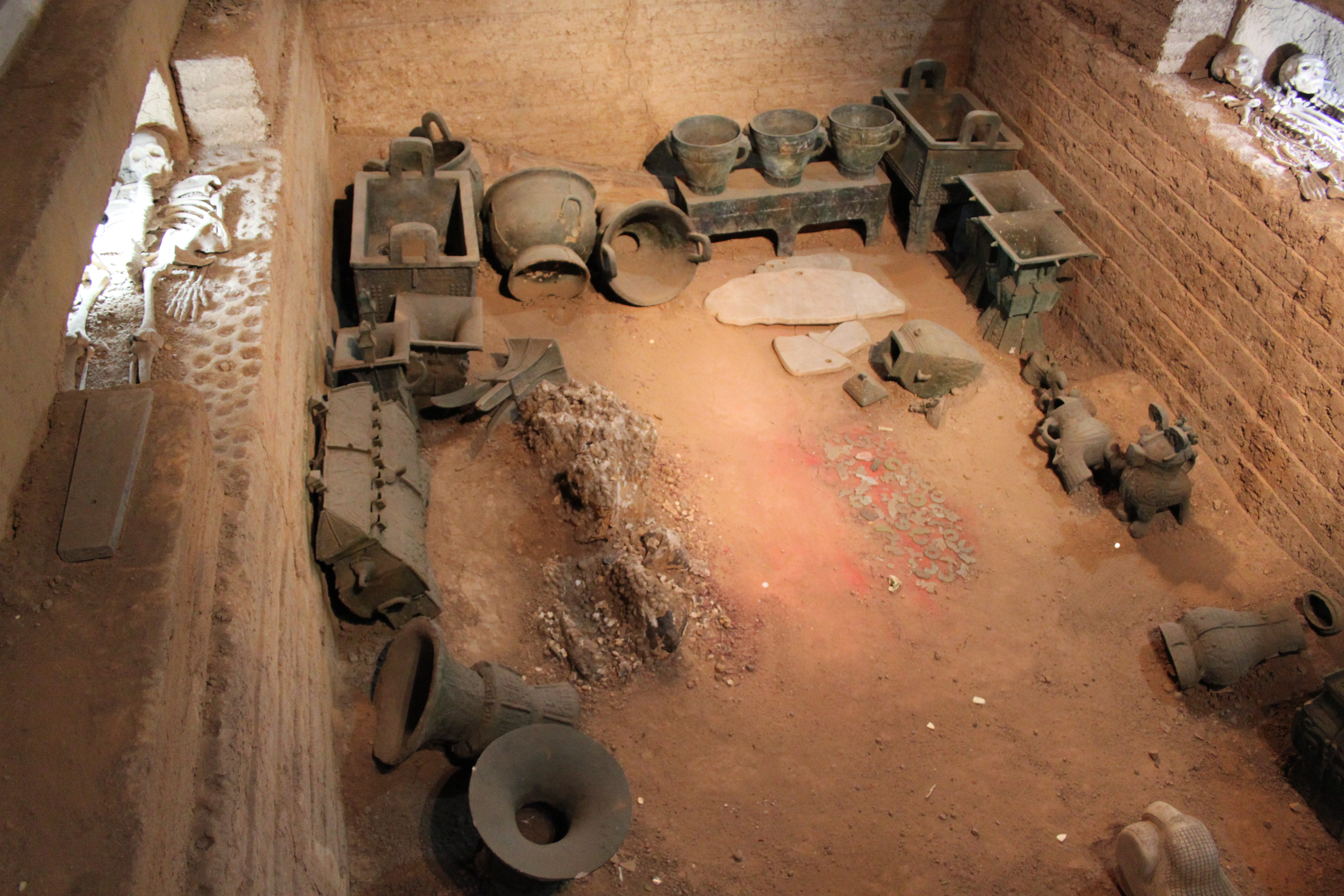
The burial pit in the Tomb of Fu Hao, built around 1200 BC.

When Fu Hao died (c. 1200 BC), Wu Ding had a famous tomb built for her, the Tomb of Fu Hao, located at Yin. Inside the tomb archaeologists found numerous Shang vessels, mirrors, bronze artifacts, and weapons, as well as the sacrificial remains of sixteen humans and six dogs. The size of the tomb was that of a room, indicating the importance of the queen and showing Wu Ding's favor towards her. Fu Hao's body remains itself was believed to have been buried in a lacquered coffin that has long since rotted away. There also seems to have once been a structure built over the tomb for holding memorial ceremonies. Posthumously, she was given the temple name Mu Xin (母辛) by the subsequent generation of kings and Bi Xin (妣辛) thereafter. She was one of three of Wu Ding's wives to receive sacrifices in the later Shang ritual cycle.

=== Other women ===
Another of Wu Ding's wives, Fu Jing (referred to in oracle bones as "Biwu" 妣戊), was probably responsible for overseeing agricultural production, as this was the subject she divined about most frequently. She also received a royal burial in Yin and was interred in Tomb 260. Unfortunately, the tomb was found to have been looted by grave robbers. Evidence from oracle bones indicates at least 60 female individuals (Wu Ding's spouses) who contributed to the court, mainly through military achievements. Nevertheless, their marriages seemed to be only for political purposes; Fu Jing and Fu Hao were the most active females among them and were recorded the most. Wu Ding's daughter, Princess Zi Tao (子妥) also received similar privileges. Her father enfeoffed her as a noble, and she acted as a local lord of her fief, paying tribute to the central government regularly. She was additionally promoted to the rank of a minister, xiao chen (小臣) ("humble servant"; hence her alternative name "Xiao Chen Tao"), which in turn allowed her to participate in court discussions and political actions. Her enfranchisement is not detailed but has been cited as proof of the Shang's reverence of women.

== Family ==
- Father: Xiao Yi (小乙), personal name Zi Lian (子敛). Recorded on oracle bones as the 20th Shang king. Nivison proposed that he succeeded the throne on xinwei, 26 January 1263 BC.
- Mother: Oracle bone scripts mention the name of one of Xiao Yi's wives as Bi Geng (妣庚): "小乙配妣庚" (Xiao Yi married Bi Geng). She might or might not be Wu Ding's mother.

Uncles:

- Yang Jia (陽甲), personal name Zi He (子和). 17th Shang king. Reigned from jiazi, 23 January 1298 BC according to Nivison.
- Pan Geng (盘庚), personal name Zi Xun (子旬). 18th Shang king. Reigned from gengyin, 17 January 1292 BC.
- Xiao Xin (小辛), personal name Zi Song (子颂). 19th Shang king. Reigned from xinchou, 22 January 1268 BC.

Consorts:

- Fu Hao (婦好), died c. 1200 BC, posthumous temple name Mu Xin (母辛). One of the primary consorts that are known as queens.
- Fu Jing (婦妌), known for overseeing millet farming. Also, a queen like Fu Hao.
- Fu Jie (妇嬕) or Fu Gui (妣癸). The third primary queen consort.
- There were more than 60 other consorts, many of which were titled "Fu" (lit. "priest", "wife"). Some of those recorded by oracle bones include Fu Bi (妇嫀), Fu Zhou (妇周), Fu Chu (妇楚), Fu Zhi (妇蛭), Fu Qi (妇杞), Fu Zheng (妇妊), Fu Pang (妇庞), Fu Tuo (妇妥).

Children:

- Zu Ji (祖己), personal name Zi Jie (子卩), initially crown prince but died young.
- Zu Geng (祖庚), personal name Zi Yue (子曜), son of Fu Gui. Appointed as crown prince, officially received the title "Xiaowang" (Expectant King) after Zu Ji's death and later became the 22nd Shang king.
- Zu Jia (祖甲), personal name Zi Zai (子載). Succeeded Zu Geng to be the 23rd Shang king.
- Xiao Chen Tao (小臣妥), personal name Zi Tao (子妥) (died during Geng Ding's regnal era). Wu Ding's daughter.

A large store of well-preserved turtle plastrons with inscriptions was discovered in 1991 at a place called Huayuanzhuang (outside the palaces at Yin). The initial owner of the plastrons appeared to be a male relative of Wu Ding. The oracle texts mention Wu Ding and Fu Hao visiting the prince frequently, which suggests his close relationship with the king himself. This person was permitted to carry out divinations: several texts in the found plastrons contain future foretellings. One divination records his inquiries about the central governments' decisions: in the day xinwei, the Prince asked whether Wu Ding would send Fu Hao to launch offensive campaigns or not.

=== Burial of royal relatives ===
All of the members of Wu Ding's family, except Fu Hao, were buried in the royal cemetery at Xibeigang. Half of his relatives, including his father and sons, were buried in the West zone of Xibeigang. Meanwhile, his uncles and wives' tombs were constructed in the East zone. It is known that the two zones were separated by Wu Ding, who was the first king of the "late Shang". He founded the West zone for his future successors' burial, apart from the section for his predecessors. Ancestor rituals that honored kings before Wu Ding were conducted in the East zone. Investigating tombs in both sections, archaeologists have identified specific tombs that contained the royal family's corpses. Three tombs, numbered 1550, 1400 and 1004, belong to the late Wu Ding era and are the most convincingly identified graves. The study of the tombs' relative locations to each other suggests that the construction planners designed them so that respect was paid to several individuals.

== Death and succession ==
=== Attempts in determining death year ===
He died in the fifty-ninth year of his reign according to all the sources available, none of which are contemporary. His year of death is unknown. Opinions vary from 1197 BC to 1180 BC, with the commonly accepted year being 1192 BC (the year proposed by the now-defunct Xia-Shang-Zhou Chronology Project). Many attempts to find his exact death year have used varied methods. One of the prevalent ones is to use astronomical records in dating. Oracle bone inscriptions from Wu Ding's reign mention lunar eclipses, of which those from 1199 BC to 1180 BC are usually associated with his death. The celestial phenomena were often linked to the Shang king's destiny: in fact, during the eclipse series, Wu Ding was recorded in oracle bones as having already declined in health. David Keightley studied four oracle bones that record eclipses, and suggested various death years. David Nivison, using Keightley's results, ruled out the possibility of a 1180 BC death, claiming that that year actually refers to an eclipse in 1201 BC. He concluded that Wu Ding died in 1189 BC, during which the corrected period's last eclipse happened. This conclusion is reached by counting Wu Ding's 3 years of filial mourning as separate from his 59-year reign. This factor is not considered in the 1192 BC approximation.

=== Burial ===
The king's place of burial is uncertain. However, there is one site that is very likely to be his grave, Tomb 1400 (located in Xibeigang's East zone). The most obvious evidence lies in its location: it was built near his consort Fu Jing's grave. Wu Ding's tomb's construction layout later became a symbol of glory and the height of power. In the last years of the 12th century BC, his descendants tended to commission their graves to be identical to his. The notable example is Wen Wu Ding, Wu Ding's 5th-generation descendant (and one of his admirers, who took his regnal name as a component of his own). His actions took place when the Shang dynasty had been experiencing sharp decline; therefore, they have been perceived as attempts to revitalize the power of the dynasty by connecting the ruler to his most exemplary ancestors.

=== Honor and succession issues ===
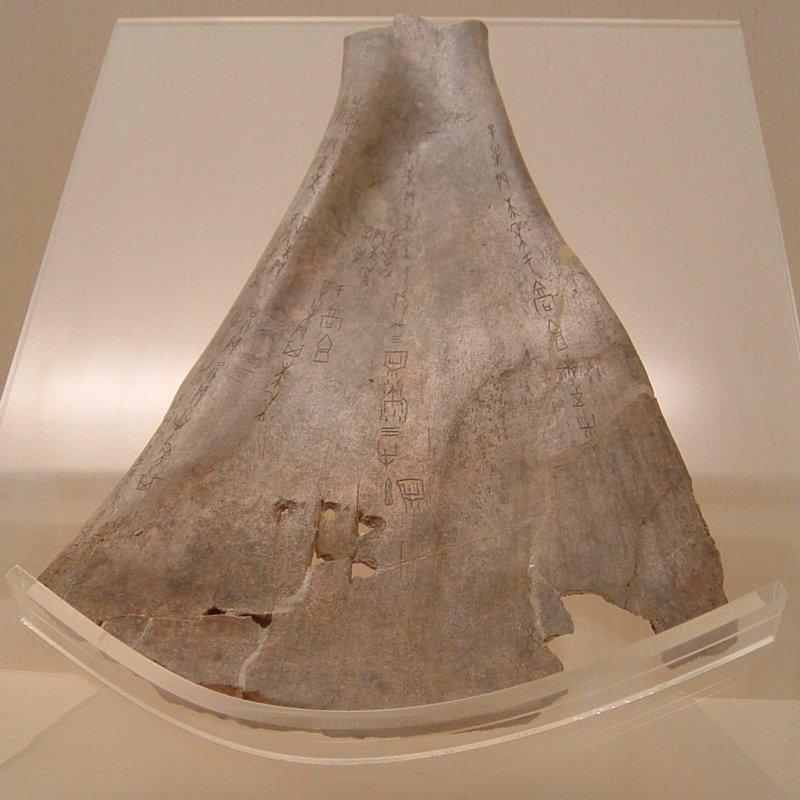
Oracle bone describing a sacrifice made to rulers from Shang Jia to Wu Ding.

Widely regarded in later tradition as one of the greatest kings of the Shang dynasty, he was given the name Wu Ding (武丁) in accordance with the sexagenary cycle. To comply with the religious tradition of worshipping royal ancestors on the day which the ancestors were named after, he was honoured by subsequent kings on the ding day. He additionally received the temple name "Gaozong" and was later posthumously titled "Xiangwang". Following his death, he was given a royal funeral and buried in the Shang cemetery. Having become a deified being in the Shang pantheon, he was addressed as "Grandfather Ding" and "Ancestor Ding" by subsequent generations and was offered numerous sacrifices.

After Wu Ding's death, the Shang throne's rules of succession were changed. His successors were his children - his three documented sons. Following his death, his child Zi Yue (子曜) became the next Shang king and was later known by the regnal name Zu Geng (祖庚). Zu Geng, according to Nivison, succeeded Wu Ding in 1188 BC. The Bamboo Annals fixes Zu's succession at the beginning of the year renshen, which most probably lay in January or February 1188 BC. The year began with a ding day; according to Shang traditional naming, Zu Geng could not use his father's regnal name. Instead, he used the stem geng, the first day of the first year after his mourning preamble (1185 BC).

== See also ==
- Fu Hao, one of Wu Ding's wives known for her tomb.
- Fu Jing, one of Wu Ding's wives known for the Houmuwu ding.
- Shang dynasty
- Late Shang, the period Wu Ding marks.
- Yinxu
- Oracle bone script
- Periodization of the Shang dynasty
- Di Xin, another historically significant ruler.

Wu Ding Shang dynasty
| Preceded by Xiao Yi | King of China | Succeeded by Zu Geng |
