= Zu Ji =

Zu Ji (祖己)
- Prince of Shang dynasty
Full name
- Family name: Zi (子)
Posthumous name
- Zu Ji (祖己)

Zu Ji (Chinese: 祖己) was the eldest son of King Wu Ding but despite his kingly title he never succeeded his father as a Shang dynasty King of China. In later texts he is known as Xiao Ji (Chinese: 孝己), while contemporary inscriptions record his name as Jie (Chinese: 卩).

In the Records of the Grand Historian he was said by Sima Qian to have died in distant exile during the twenty-fifth year of his father's reign.

Oracle script inscriptions on bones unearthed at Yinxu confirm his lineage and his failure to succeed to the throne.
