= Sun Ji (archaeologist) =

Chinese archaeologist (1929–2023)

Sun Ji (Chinese: 孙机, September 28, 1929 – June 15, 2023), is a native of Qingdao, Shandong, was a Chinese cultural relics scholar and archaeologist, National Museum of China research librarian, and Central Research Museum of Culture and History member.

== Biography ==
He employed with the Beijing Municipal Federation of Trade Unions in November 1949. 1950 he was sent to the Beijing Municipal Federation of Trade Unions' Literature and Art Section of Publicity Department. Under Shen Congwen, he studied the history of ancient Chinese clothing in 1951 and helped with Chinese bronze mirror collation. In 1955 he was accepted into Peking University's Department of History, concentrating in archaeology, under Su Bai. 1960 came his graduation from Peking University's Department of History.

His shift to the Museum of Chinese History's Department of Archaeology came in 1979, and became a title of Researcher in 1986. He was named a member of the National Commission for the Identification of Cultural Relics (Chinese: 国家文物鉴定委员会) by the Ministry of Culture of the People's Republic of China in 1990.

He died on June 15, 2023, due to the complications of COVID-19.
