= Zheng Zhenxiang =

Chinese archaeologist (1929–2024)

- 郑振香
- Born: 1929; Dongguang County, Hebei, China
- Died: 14 March 2024 (aged 94)
- Education: Peking University
- Known for: Excavation of Anyang; excavation of Fuhao's tomb
- Spouse: Chen Zhida 陈志达
- Scientific career
- Fields: Archaeology
- Workplaces: Institute of Archaeology, Chinese Academy of Social Sciences

Zheng Zhenxiang (Chinese: 郑振香; 1929 – 14 March 2024) was a Chinese archaeologist most famous for excavating the Bronze Age tomb of Fuhao at Anyang in 1976. She has been referred to as the 'First Lady of Chinese Archaeology'. Zheng died on 14 March 2024, at the age of 94.

== Career ==
After completing her undergraduate degree at Peking University in 1954, Zheng worked as a specialist archaeology teaching assistant in the History Department. In 1955, she was exempted from having her status converted to that of a research student. For the next four years, Zheng studied Shang and Zhou Dynasty archaeology under the guidance of Yin Da. She graduated in 1959 and was assigned to the Institute of Archaeology, Chinese Academy of Social Sciences, continuing to study Shang and Zhou archaeology.

In 1959, Zheng was the leader of an excavation team working on the site of Wangwan (王湾) near Luoyang and led archaeological fieldwork training for students of Peking University. The publication of the Luoyang excavations was written in 1960 to 1961, however, after the period of reform and opening up in the early 1980s, the manuscript was edited by Zhao Zhiquan (赵芝荃) and published in 1989.

In the Autumn of 1962, Zheng was assigned leader of an excavation team working at Anyang researching the Yinxu culture. She was joined by 59 Peking University students, whom Zheng taught archaeological field methods to. During this field season, the four-period dating framework for Yinxu was established, with the first period calibrated to the period of King Wu Ding using oracle bones. Further excavations were run at Miaopu North (Miaopu bei di 苗圃北地) between 1963 and 1964.

== Fuhao ==
During the Cultural Revolution, all planned excavations were suspended and only small-scale excavations in places under construction were permitted. An agricultural competition was held in the Anyang area in the winter of 1975, which involved flattening the land, repairing drains and other tasks. Zheng arrived to discover ancient building materials north of where the drains were being repaired and conducted excavations. A workshop was excavated, including ceramics and jades.

At the same time, Zheng and her team conducted surveys of the area north of Xiaotun Village, taking cores from the soil using augering devices known as Luoyang spades. They found ancient architecture and tamped earth, which prevented local work teams from levelling the hill. Zheng believed there was also a tomb beneath the tamped earth, which the majority of her peers disagreed with. In 1976, excavations were conducted on an area approximately 1,000 m^{2} in size. They unearthed 46 sets of foundations, 165 ash pits, and 54 burials – the most important of which was the tomb of Wu Ding's consort and general, Fuhao. Fuhao's tomb was extremely well preserved, and, in contrast to other tombs, had not been robbed. There was a huge number of grave goods, including bronzes, jades, precious stones and ivory, as well as a total of 1,928 bone artefacts and more than 7,000 seashells. Bronze artefacts included 468 ritual vessels and weapons. Of the 210 ritual vessels, 190 were engraved with characters and Fuhao's name was on 109 of them. Zheng identified the characters Fuhao as referring to the prominent individual mentioned in the oracle bones of the Wu Ding period as presiding over rituals and leading soldiers into battle.

== Bibliography ==
- Yinxu Fuhao Mu 殷墟妇好墓, Kaogu Zhuankan Dingzhong 考古专刊丁种. Wenwu Chubanshe 文物出版社, 1980 (reprinted 1985). [co-author]
- Yinxu Yuqi 殷墟玉器. Wenwu Chubanshe 文物出版社, 1982. [co-author]
- Yinxu Qintongqi, Kaogu Zhuankan Yizhong 考古专刊乙种. Wenwu Chubanshe 文物出版社, 1985. [co-author]
- Yinxu de Faxian yu Yanjiu 墟的发现与研究. Kexue Chubanshe 科学出版社, 1994 (reprinted 2001; published as part of Chinese Academy of Social Sciences volume in 2007). [co-author]
- 'The Royal Consort Fu Hao and Her Tomb', in Jessica Rawson (ed), Mysteries of Ancient China: New Discoveries from the Early Dynasties, pp. 240–247. London: British Museum Press. ISBN 0-7141-1472-3
- Anyang Xiaodun 安阳小屯, Kaogu Zhuankan 考古专刊. Shijie Tushu Chubanshe, 2004. [co-author]
- Anyang Xiaodun Yinxu Jianzhu Yicun 安阳小屯殷墟建筑遗存, Kaogu Zhuankan Dingzhong 考古专刊丁种. Wenwu Chubanshe 文物出版社, 2010. [co-author]

== Honours ==
- State Council Special Government Grant (1992).
- First Outstanding Scientific Achievement Award for the publication Yinxu Fuhao Mu 殷墟妇好墓 from the Chinese Academy of Social Sciences (1993).
- Second Outstanding Scientific Achievement Award for the publication Yinxu de Faxian yu Yanjiu 殷墟的发现与研究 from the Chinese Academy of Social Sciences (1996).

== Sources ==
- Loewe, Michael; Shaughnessy, Edward L. (13 March 1999). The Cambridge History of Ancient China: From the Origins of Civilization to 221 BC. London: Cambridge University Press. ISBN 978-0-521-47030-8.
