= Xia–Shang–Zhou Chronology Project =

Historical dating project in China

The Xia–Shang–Zhou Chronology Project (Chinese: 夏商周断代工程; pinyin: Xià Shāng Zhōu Duàndài Gōngchéng) was a multi-disciplinary project commissioned by the People's Republic of China in 1996 to determine with accuracy the location and time frame of the Xia, Shang, and Zhou dynasties.

The project was directed by professor Li Xueqin of Tsinghua University in Beijing, and involved around 200 experts. It used radiocarbon dating, archaeological dating methods, historical textual analysis, astronomy, and other methods to achieve greater temporal and geographic accuracy. Preliminary results were released in November 2000 and the final report was published in June 2022. Among other findings, it dated the beginning of the Xia to c. 2070 BCE, the Shang to c. 1600 BCE, and the Zhou to c. 1046 BCE. However, some scholars have disputed several of the project's methods and conclusions.

== Background ==
Major archaeological sites in north and central China dating from the second millennium BC

The traditional account of ancient China, represented by the Records of the Grand Historian written by Sima Qian in the Han dynasty, begins with the Three Sovereigns and Five Emperors, leading through a sequence of dynasties, the Xia, Shang and Zhou. Sima Qian felt able to give a year-by-year chronology back to the start of the Gonghe Regency in 841 BC, early in the Zhou dynasty. For the period before that date, his sources (now mostly lost) were unreliable and inconsistent, and he gave only lists of kings and accounts of isolated events. Later scholars were unable to push a precise chronology back past Sima Qian's date of 841 BC.

Many elements of the traditional account, especially the early parts, were clearly mythical. In the 1920s, Gu Jiegang and other scholars of the Doubting Antiquity School noted that the earliest figures appeared latest in the literature, and suggested that the traditional history had accreted layers of myth. Noting parallels between the accounts of the Xia and Shang, they suggested that the history of the Xia was invented by the Zhou to support their doctrine of the Mandate of Heaven, by which they justified their conquest of the Shang. Some even doubted the historicity of the Shang dynasty.

Ox scapula with an inscription recording a divination by Zheng in the reign of the Shang King Wu Ding

In 1899, the scholar Wang Yirong examined some curious symbols carved on "dragon bones" purchased from a Chinese pharmacist, and identified them as an early form of Chinese writing. The bones were finally traced back in 1928 to a site (now called Yinxu) near Anyang, north of the Yellow River in modern Henan province. The inscriptions on the bones were found to be divination records from the reigns of the last nine Shang kings, from the reign of Wu Ding. Moreover, from the sacrificial schedule recorded on the bones it was possible to reconstruct a sequence of Shang kings that closely matched the list given by Sima Qian.

Archaeologists focused on the Yellow River valley in Henan as the most likely site of the states described in the traditional histories. After 1950, remnants of an earlier walled city of the Erligang culture were discovered near Zhengzhou, and in 1959 the site of the Erlitou culture was found in Yanshi, south of the Yellow River near Luoyang. Radiocarbon dating suggests that the Erlitou culture flourished c. 2100 BC to 1800 BC. They built large palaces, suggesting the existence of an organized state. More recently the picture has been complicated by the discovery of advanced civilizations in Sichuan and the Yangtze valley, such as Sanxingdui and Wucheng, of which the traditional histories make no mention.

Until the mid-20th century, many popular works, both Chinese and Western, used a traditional chronology calculated by Liu Xin early in the first century AD. However, modern scholars studying inscriptions on Shang oracle bones and Zhou bronzes were proposing shorter chronologies, for example typically placing the Zhou conquest of the Shang in the mid-11th century BC instead of the 12th.

In 1994, Song Jian, a state councillor for science, was impressed on a visit to Egypt by chronologies stretching back to the 3rd millennium BC. He proposed a multi-disciplinary project to establish a similar chronology for China. The project was approved as part of the ninth five-year plan (1996–2000).

A preliminary report of the project was issued in 2000. After lengthy review, the full report was sent to the publishers in 2019 and the offices of the Project were closed, with their materials sent to the Institute of Archaeology of the Chinese Academy of Social Sciences. The full report was published in June 2022 after more than a decade of revision. (Note: "李伯谦回忆，根据简本写就的繁本报告初稿其实出来得很快，但将初稿交付给专家组，根据专家组意见对工程的9大课题、44个专题研究成果进行全面补充，'时间就漫长了，大约从2005年进行到了2016年底。'拟出版的报告交给出版社时，时间已是2017年。经过对内容进行全面且精心的核实与校对，科学出版社才小心翼翼地将这本书交给大众。"[Li Boqian recalls that the first draft of the full report was quickly completed, but [after] it was given to the expert review board, [the board asked to] provide supplemental information on the 9 Subjects and 44 Results of the Project. "That took a much longer time, from 2005 to the end of 2016." The finished report was sent to the publisher in 2017. The Science Press delivered the book only after careful, complete verification and checking.]) Although the final report noted that some archaeological finds after the publication of the preliminary report were inconsistent with its findings, the chronology of the preliminary report was adopted without change.

== Methods ==
The Project used a combination of methods to attempt to correlate the traditional literature with archeological discoveries and the astronomical record.

=== Western Zhou kings ===
The contemporary evidence for the Western Zhou consists of thousands of bronzes, many bearing inscriptions. Around 60 of these record dates of important events as the day in the sexagenary cycle, the phase of the moon, the month and the year of reign. However, the rules of the Western Zhou lunisolar calendar, in particular the start of a month or year and the insertion of intercalary months, were not fixed. In addition, the current king is typically not identified.

Occasionally an unusual astronomical event was recorded. A key reference point was the accession of King Yih, when according to the "old text" Bamboo Annals the day dawned twice. The Project adopted (without acknowledgement) the proposal of the Korean scholar Pang Sunjoo (方善柱) that this referred to an annular solar eclipse at dawn that occurred in 899 BC. Other scholars have challenged both this interpretation of the text and the astronomical calculations involved.

=== King Wu's conquest of the Shang ===
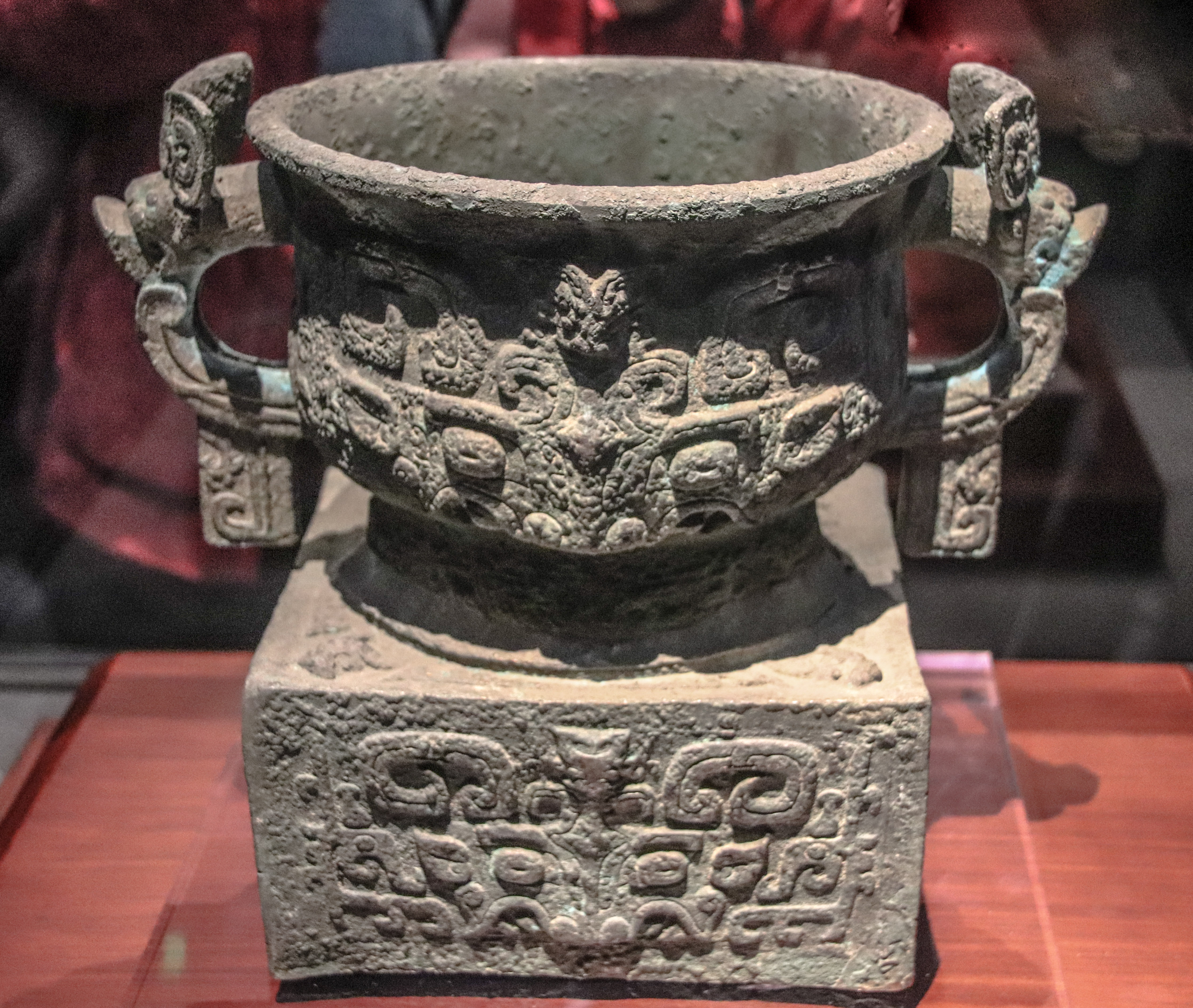
The early Zhou Li gui, which is inscribed with an account of the Zhou conquest of the Shang

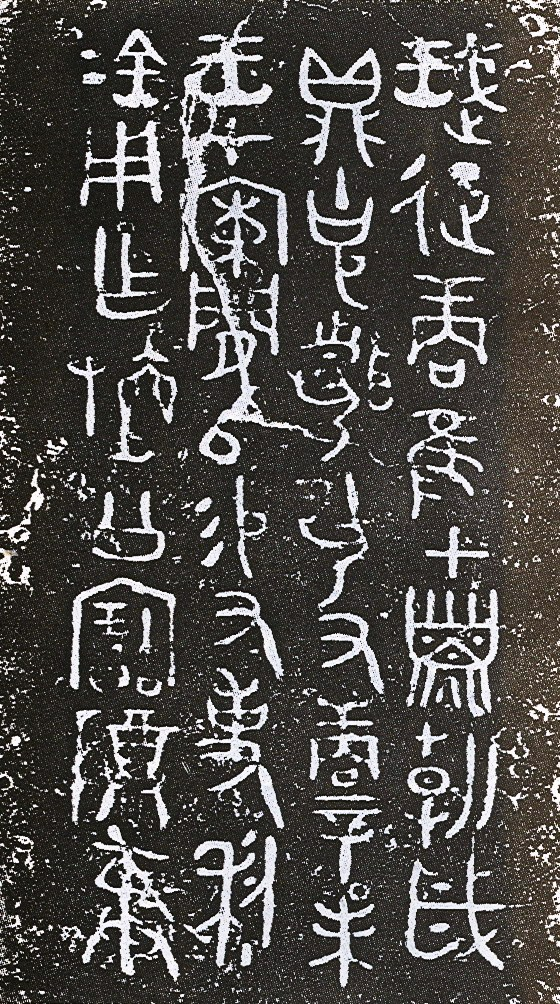
Rubbing of the Li gui inscription

Perhaps the most significant event requiring dating is the conquest of the Shang by the Zhou, described in traditional histories as the Battle of Muye, though the site of the battle has not been identified. Previous chronologies had proposed at least 44 different dates for this event, ranging from 1130 to 1018 BC. The most popular have been 1122 BC, calculated by the Han dynasty astronomer Liu Xin, and 1027 BC, deduced from a statement in the "old text" Bamboo Annals that the Western Zhou (whose end point is known to be 770 BC) had lasted 257 years.

A few documents relate astronomical observations to this event:

- A quotation in the Book of Han from the lost Wǔchéng 武成 chapter of the Book of Documents appears to describe a lunar eclipse just before the beginning of King Wu's campaign. This date, and the date of his victory, are given as months and sexagenary days.
- A passage in the Guoyu gives the positions of the Sun, Moon, Jupiter and two stars on the day King Wu attacked the Shang.
- The "current text" Bamboo Annals mentions conjunctions of all five planets occurring before and after the Zhou conquest. Han-period texts mention the first conjunction as occurring in the 32nd year of the reign of the last king. Such events are rare, but all five planets did gather on 28 May 1059 BC and again on 26 September 1019 BC. Although the recorded positions in the sky of these two events are the reverse of what occurred, they could not have been retrospectively calculated at the time the account first appears.

The strategy adopted by the Project was to use archeological investigation to narrow the range of dates that would need to be compared with the astronomical data. Although no archaeological traces of King Wu's campaign have been found, the pre-conquest Zhou capital at Fengxi in Shaanxi has been excavated and strata at the site have been identified with the Predynastic Zhou. Radiocarbon dating of samples from the site as well as at late Yinxu and early Zhou capitals, using the wiggle matching technique, yielded a date for the conquest between 1050 and 1020 BC. The only date within that range matching all the astronomical data is 20 January 1046 BC. This date had previously been proposed by David Pankenier, who had matched the above passages from the classics with the same astronomical events, but here it resulted from a thorough consideration of a broader range of evidence.

Other scholars have raised several criticisms of this process. The connection between the layers at the archaeological sites and the conquest is uncertain. The narrow range of radiocarbon dates are cited with a less stringent confidence interval (68%) than the standard requirement of 95%, which would have produced a much wider range. The texts describing the relevant astronomical phenomena are extremely obscure. For example, the inscription on the Li gui, a key text used in dating the conquest, can be interpreted in several different ways, with one alternative reading leading to the date of 9 January 1044 BC.

=== Late Shang kings ===
Most of the Late Shang oracle bones provide less detail than Zhou bronzes, routinely recording only the day in the sexagenary cycle. However, calculations using a longer ritual cycle were used to date the reigns of the last two Shang kings. Mentions of five lunar eclipses in oracle bone divinations from the late Wu Ding and Zu Geng reigns were identified with events spanning the period from 1201 and 1181 BC, from which a start date for Zu Geng's reign was derived. The start date of Wu Ding's reign was then calculated using the statement in the "Against Luxurious Ease" chapter of the Book of Documents that his reign lasted 59 years.

=== Early Shang and Xia ===
Erlitou sites (black) and Xia capitals identified in traditional sources (red, with numbers for those from the "current text" Bamboo Annals)

According to the traditional histories, Pan Geng, three reigns earlier than Wu Ding, moved the Shang capital to its last site, generally identified with the Yinxu site in Anyang. Different interpretations of the text of the Bamboo Annals give intervals of 275, 273 or 253 years between this event and the Zhou conquest. The project settled on a date near the shortest of these intervals.

The four phases of the Erlitou culture have been divided between the Xia and Shang dynasties in different ways by various prominent archaeologists. The project assigned all four phases to the Xia, identifying the establishment of the Shang dynasty with the building of the Yanshi walled city 6 km (3.7 mi) north-east of the Erlitou site. The time span of the Xia dynasty was taken from reign-lengths given in the Bamboo Annals and from a conjunction of five planets during the reign of Yu the Great recorded in later texts. As this period was longer than the time spanned by the Erlitou culture, the project also included the later phases of the Wangwan III variant of the Longshan culture within the Xia period.

== Chronological table ==
The Xia–Shang–Zhou Chronology Project concluded precise dates for accessions of rulers from Wu Ding, the Shang dynasty king whose reign produced the oldest known oracle bone records. These dates are here compared with the traditional dates and those used in the Cambridge History of Ancient China:

Dynasty	King	Accession date (BC)		
Dynasty	King	XSZ Project	Cambridge History	Traditional
Shang	Wu Ding	1250	before 1198	1324
Shang	Zu Geng	1191	after 1188	1265
Shang	Zu Jia	–	c. 1177	1258
Shang	Lin Xin	–	c. 1157	1225
Shang	Kang Ding	–	c. 1148	1219
Shang	Wu Yi	1147	c. 1131	1198
Shang	Wen Ding	1112	c. 1116	1194
Shang	Di Yi	1101	1105	1191
Shang	Di Xin	1075	1086	1154
Zhou	King Wu	1046	1045	1122
Zhou	King Cheng	1042	1042	1115
Zhou	King Kang	1020	1005	1078
Zhou	King Zhao	995	977	1052
Zhou	King Mu	976	956	1001
Zhou	King Gong	922	917	946
Zhou	King Yih	899	899	934
Zhou	King Xiao	891	872?	909
Zhou	King Yi	885	865	894
Zhou	King Li	877	857	878

Earlier dates are given more approximately:

- The relocation of the Shang capital to Yin during the reign of Pan Geng is aligned with the earliest layers at Yinxu, dated at c. 1300 BC.
- The establishment of the Shang dynasty was identified with the foundation of an Erligang culture walled city at Yanshi, dated at c. 1600 BC, compared with the Cambridge History's c. 1570 BC and the traditional date of 1766 BC.
- The establishment of the Xia dynasty was dated at c. 2070 BC, compared with the traditional date of 2205 BC.

== Reception ==
Coverage of the project in non-Chinese press focused on the conflict between nationalism and scholarship. However, not every member of the chronology project agreed on all of the dates. Indeed, the project has rejected dates proposed even by the director. This suggested to Harvard archaeologist Yun Kuen Lee that politics did not influence the detailed work of the project.

In addition to methodological concerns, scholars have complained that the project is part of a tradition of relegating archaeology to a role of verifying traditional histories. They argue that this forces archeological evidence into a framework of a single sequence of similar dominant states, as depicted in the histories and reflected in the title "Three Dynasties". However, when evaluated on its own merits, the evidence reveals a much more complex origin of Chinese civilization, with many other advanced states that are not mentioned in the histories.

A session of the Annual Conference of the Association for Asian Studies in 2002 was devoted to the preliminary report, where its methods were criticised by David Nivison, among others. An international conference on chronology arranged for October 2003 was postponed due to the SARS outbreak, but never rescheduled. The Project's dates have however become the orthodox chronology in Chinese textbooks and reference works.

Some bronze inscriptions discovered since the draft report was issued in 2000 are inconsistent with the project's dates for the Western Zhou. For example:

- The Jue Gong gui, an early Western Zhou vessel probably from the reign of King Cheng but possibly from the following King Kang, has an inscription stating that it was cast in the 28th year of the king, whereas the project gave reign lengths of 22 and 25 years respectively to these kings.
- The Jun gui, assigned to the reign of King Yih, has an inscription stating that it was cast in the 10th year of the king, to whom the project assigned a reign of 8 years.

The final report acknowledged many of these problems, but did not alter the date table issued in the preliminary report.

== See also ==
- History of China
- History of Qing (People's Republic)
- Five thousand years of Chinese civilization
