= Peng (diviner) =

Late Shang diviner

Peng 彭
- Peng 彭 in oracle bone script.
- Born: c. 12-11th Century B.C. Shang dynasty
- Occupation: Shang dynasty diviner
- Years active: c. Zu Jia to Geng Ding's reign
- Known for: Evidence of scribal training in Yin in the He group Early examples of education

Peng
- Peng in small seal script.
- Chinese: 彭
Transcriptions
Standard Mandarin
- Hanyu Pinyin: péng
- Bopomofo: ㄆㄥˊ
- Wade–Giles: pʻeng²
Wu
- Romanization: ban^{6}
Middle Chinese
- Middle Chinese: baeng
Old Chinese
- Baxter–Sagart (2014): /*C.[b]ˤraŋ/
- Zhengzhang: /*braːŋ/

Peng (彭) was a religious practitioner appearing in a lead role in the divination process during the Late Shang period of the Shang dynasty. Their (Note: Peng's gender is not known.) name appears across myriad oracle bones with an emerging handwriting style, giving a rather complete picture of their career from early life through a developed career.

== Periodisation ==
Dong Zuobin classifies the Late Shang's oracle bones and their ritual cycles into five parts. Peng is classified as member of the He 何 group in Period III. Peng can be compared to other diviners such as Zheng or Nan, beginning as a student learning oracle bone script before flourishing as a scribe. Although there are various ancient or Classical Chinese literary references to a diviner or diviners named Peng, no explicit identification is possible.

== Early life ==
Despite only being visible in oracle bone evidence, Peng appears in myriad texts dated to the reigns of Zu Jia, Lin Xin, and Geng Ding, within the textual styles of the He 何 group. Rao Zongyi has dated Peng back further to Wu Ding's reign through stylistic analysis, particularly on the use of fu 父 "father," which is more typical of Wu Ding-era inscriptions, and uses this to determine that Peng could not have been active during the reign of Wu Yi. In the earliest instances they are seen, Peng's handwriting is noticeably inept and almost anomalous, which implies that they were learning to write, possibly as a child given the length of time they were active. Smith (2011) has therefore surmised that Peng was a student scribe, possibly learning divination. It appears that Peng worked in a xue 學 "workshop" (Note: While in modern Chinese, this is a verb "to study," it is implied that it functioned as a noun in the Shang dynasty as well as a verb.) and gained literacy through working with established diviners.

== Career ==
As oracle bone scribes were not necessarily diviners, it is unknown whether Peng was an actual diviner, only that Peng at least operated as a scribe. However, later texts show Peng issuing charges, which appear to show an emerging career later in life.

One of the earliest cases of Peng performing a true divination and not merely copying as they learn to write was during a sacrifice to Hé 河, a deity representing the Yellow River. This was coupled with documenting numbers of sacrificial victims prescribed to be used in the ceremony.

己巳卜，彭貞：御于河，三十人。十月又二……
On the jisi day, plastromancy was performed. Peng charges: Sacrificing to Hé, 30 people. On the tenth month there was two...

Later in life, Peng becomes more proficient, being seen making a divination towards holding a banquet towards princes.

甲寅卜，彭貞：多子其饗。
On the jiayin day, plastromancy was performed. Peng charges: May we perform a banquet for the many princes?

Similarly, they also wrote enquiries regarding banquets to perform for ancestral kings, namely Da Yi, Zu Yi, and Zu Ding:

癸亥卜彭貞大乙祖乙祖丁暨饗
On the guihai day, plastromancy was performed. Peng charges: Should we perform a banquet for Da Yi, Zu Yi, and Zu Ding?

Peng would go on to write more extensively, such as in the case of this bone, where Peng is involved with a you sacrifice to Bi Ji, the wife of Zu Ding:

癸亥卜彭貞其侑于丁妣己在十月又二小臣𡆥立
On the guihai day, plastromancy was performed. Peng charges: May we perform a you sacrifice to Ding's wife, Bi Ji, in the tenth month? Two minor officials were present to the divination.
