= Shang dynasty religious practitioners =

Ancient Chinese polytheistic religion

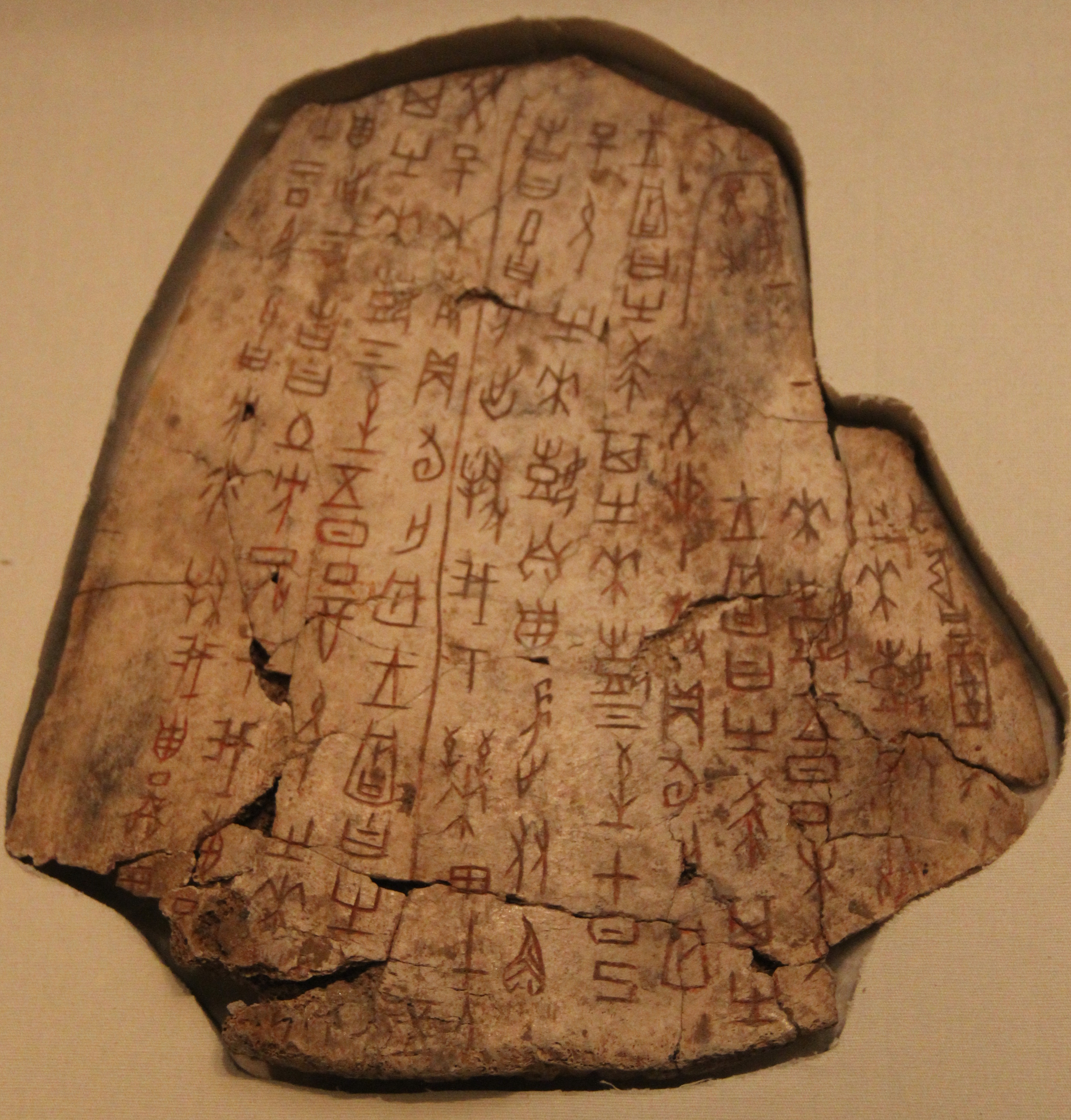
A Shang oracle text written by the Bīn group of diviners from period I, corresponding to the reign of King Wu Ding (c. 1250 BCE)

The Shang dynasty of China (c. 1600 – c. 1046 BCE), which adhered to a polytheistic religion centered around worshipping ancestors, structured itself into key religious roles with the king acting as head. As recorded on Shang oracle bones, royal adherents were grouped into specialist teams such as diviners, spirit mediums and those who conducted sacrifices. Outside of the capital area, lineages of Shang royal origins also developed religious activities resembling those of the central government.

The involvement of shamans in the Shang religion is under debate as written records are not sufficient for a conclusive determination. A prominent theory proposed by K. C. Chang contends that actual shamans were employed by the Shang, but it has met various counterarguments. It is agreed that the spirit medium group referred to as Shang shamans played active roles in Shang religious traditions.

As Shang practices varied throughout its dynastic course, several roles within its religious structure experienced substantial changes. The Shang kings gradually consolidated their religious authority, and by the last decades of the Shang they had personally assumed the role of diviners. After the fall of Shang, the succeeding Zhou dynasty bestowed the state of Song upon Shang descendants, who continued the worship of their royal ancestors.

== Royal adherents ==
Oracle bones serve as the primary source for studies of Shang religion. They focused on the religious life of the king and the royal family. A typical ritual would feature many key roles; the sinologist David Keightley conjured such a ritual based on actual inscriptional records, frequently featuring the Shang kings along with religious specialists.

=== Shang kings and royal clan ===
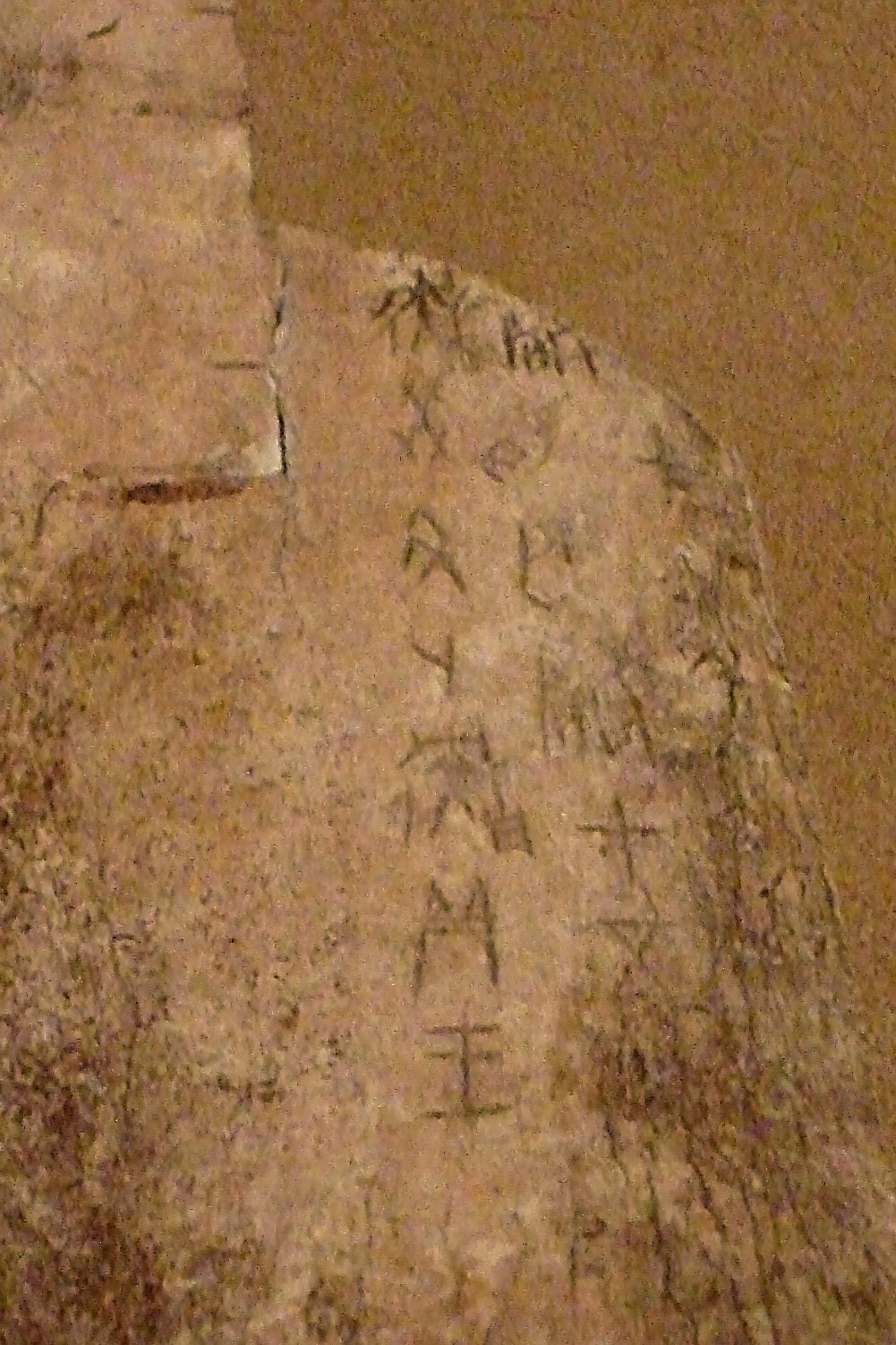
An oracle bone inscription which records the king consulting his ancestor Xiao Jia in a worshipping ritual.

The Shang king was at the center of all practitioners and acted as both the chief priest and the supreme intermediary between humans and spirits; he was sometimes referred to by modern studies as a 'thearch'. He ruled as a surrogate for the Shang supreme god throughout all four directions and exercised authority over all royal cult practices.

The Shang king communicated through means of divination, written on oracle bones. During a typical divination the king would usually give the final prognostications, which were then inscribed on oracle bones. He likely possessed the monopolized right to take part in divinations concerning state matters, and only he was allowed to read cracks on oracle bones, even when the charges were made by his diviners. The king could carry out the hosting ritual to connect with his ancestors, and he seemed to have exclusive rights to conduct this practice. He also facilitated lineage ancestor worship, with the highly religious king Wu Ding sending sacrificial materials to a Shang prince living outside of the capital. Wu Ding also seemed to be the organizer of his relatives' mortuary rituals, including that of his father Xiao Yi and his son Zu Ji.

Shang religion mostly concerned royal ancestors, and the High God Di was also probably a collective of many Shang ancestral spirits. The king's descendancy from the gods would then strengthen his legitimacy to rule. Besides their own ancestors, the kings also seemed to have incorporated tribal spirits into their pantheon in a move to gain support from tribal allies. Some among such spirits later featured in classical Chinese literature, such as Wang Hai and Kui. It was also a practice of the kings to conduct rituals to the Sun, which is interpreted as a way for them to control Shang familial branches.

Some close relatives of the Shang kings assumed roles as priests. A prominent figure among those was Fu Hao, a consort of Wu Ding recorded on inscriptions as host of sacrificial ceremonies. In one particular example, she presided over the offering of about 500 Qiang prisoners. Shang princes, each of whom headed a minor lineage, also participated in the king's ancestral sacrifices. Heirs to the throne were granted exclusive access to some ritual bronzes such as the ding, and the princes also occasionally appear as subjects of the king's divinations.

=== Divination staff ===
Shang diviners were referred to as duobu and were possibly directed by a supervisor; their organization exhibits traits of a bureaucracy. Oracle bone inscriptions record approximately 120 diviners whose names are known to modern academics. Shang diviners were members of lineages mentioned in oracle bone inscriptions, suggesting that such individuals did not have low status. The diviners also seemed to trace their origins to various regions with close connection to the ruling elite in Anyang; in fact, over 30 out of 120 diviners had names coinciding with places outside the capital area. The family grave of such a diviner in Anyang offers evidence that the person originated somewhere else, although he grew up in the capital area.

Shang divination staff usually conducted their practice in ancestral temples, but they could also proceed outside of the ritual center in the capital – such as on a hunt – and in those cases they tended to specify the place of divination. The staff prepared the bones, mainly scapulae and plastrons, and after that diviners applied heat to them. They then tried to determine spiritual responses from bone cracks caused by the heat. After their crack-reading and the king's prognostication, the staff inscribed a complete divination record on the bone, likely copying from a preliminary account on perishable materials.

Modern academics identify about ten major diviner groups mentioned in oracle bone inscriptions. Contemporary scholarship follow the 20th century Chinese academic Dong Zuobin's assignment of Shang diviners to five chronological phases:

Dong Zuobin's diviner periodization
Period	Kings	Some contemporary diviners
I	Wu Ding (Note: Dong also included kings Pan Geng, Xiao Xin and Xiao Yi. However, few or perhaps no inscriptions can be reliably assigned to pre-Wu Ding reigns. Many scholars assume that earlier oracle bones from Anyang exist but have not yet been found.)	Nán 㱿 or 𬆩, Bīn 賓, Zheng 爭
II	Zu Geng, Zu Jia	Dà 大, Lǚ 旅, Xíng 行, Jí 即, Yǐn 尹, Chū 出
III	Lin Xin, Kang Ding	Hé 何, Péng 彭
IV	Wu Yi, Wen Ding	Lì 曆
V	Di Yi, Di Xin	

Currently, the very earliest inscriptions is identified to be that of the Shi group, and was probably the ancestor of later inscriptions. This group was active during the early reign of Wu Ding and included diviners Fu, Shi, Ye, and Shao. This diviner group functioned under the direct supervision of Wu Ding, who sometimes appeared as a diviner in its inscriptions. Calligraphy of these diviners comprises both large and small graph styles. Shi-group diviners were separated into factions and, also during Wu Ding's reign, developed into the Bin and Li diviner teams.

Ox scapula from the reign of King Wu Ding, with inscription by a Bin-group diviner named Zheng.

After the Shi diviner group, diviners were divided into two distinct branches, North and South, based on the location of their writing's remains. The North branch's Bin group was the most active Wu Ding-era group and remained functional during the reign of Zu Geng. Bin-group diviners were notable in that they employed a form of complementary divination charges, a practice rarely seen in other groups. This group was further composed of two subdivisions with different script content and calligraphy. Another prominent team active during Wu Ding's reign was the Li group, whose members often divined about the same topics as the Bin-group diviners despite their calligraphic distinctions. Diviners of the Li group were dated to the Wu Yi and Wen Ding reigns by Chen Mengjia and Dong Zuobin, but later studies suggested a much earlier date – from Wu Ding to Zu Jia.

A group named Chu emerged during the last years of Wu Ding's reign and operated actively during the eras of his two sons, Zu Geng and Zu Jia. Regular diviners in this group include Chu, Da Ji, Xiong, Xi, Xian and several others. The Shang king was in charge of many of their divinations. Their calligraphy is considered very neat and distinctive, and their content reveals the first mentions of the regular five-ritual cycle that became the norm during later reigns. Chu-group diviners did not mention pre-Shang Jia mythological ancestors as much as earlier groups, and they also practiced a different bone-cracking method.

During the last reigns of the Shang, a major group named Huang arose, mostly featured diviners Huang, Pai and Li. It was a combination of the He group and another unnamed team called Wuming ('Unnamed'). Huang-group diviners are characterized by their small, vertical writing. They often wrote about sacrifices, war, and hunting; some of their longest inscriptions do not concern divination but rather documenting ceremonial events. Inscriptions by two diviners, Huang and Chu, have been used to infer a ritual schedule employed during the last reigns of the Shang.

=== The wu and shamanism ===
Numerous evidence seemingly suggests that shamans played a role in the Shang religion. Certain characteristics within the occupation of diviners suggest that they may also have acted as shamans. Since the Shang kings were sometimes recorded as diviners, they could be identified as shamans themselves, whose practice contributed to the institution of Shang thearchy. The hosting ritual (賓; bīn) commonly carried out by the kings is a point of academic contention about shamanism in Shang religion. This ritual allowed the Shang king to connect with his ancestors, for example in this particular inscription:

Crack-making on dinghai, the king divined: "On the next day, wuzi, when the king hosts Da Wu and performs the zai ritual, there will be no harm."

— Heji 22779

Some scholars understand the hosting ritual to have featured the kings as ceremonial hosts uniquely equipped to "hear" the spiritual messages in religious events. Kwang-chih Chang and fellow proponents strongly endorse the theory that the ritual must have been shamanic, while others argue that the ritual did not involve the king immersed in ecstasy and spirit commingling and was thus non-shamanic. There was also a ritual of invocation whose graph depicts a figure – assumed to be the Shang king himself – dressed with a ghost head mask and kneeling in front of an ancestral altar. They might utilize materials such as wine and grass bundles to accompany them in this trance-like act. Oracle bone inscriptions record instances in which the kings engaged in invocative ceremonies, as demonstrated by an example below:

At divination on the gengchen day: The king will carry out the rite of invocation to Father Xin with sheep, pigs [and] you-buckets of millet wine.

— Jinbun 3014

Some assert that the kings desired to invoke the spirits through this, and since it was also their exclusive right to carry it out, the king was effectively a shaman-priest.

The Shang employed spirit mediums referred to in oracle bone inscriptions as wu (巫). Gilles Boileau identifies four possible interpretations of the wu, including a spirit, a sacrifice, a form of divination, or a living human being. The wu itself does not appear frequently on Shang inscriptions.

There exist several notable characteristics of the Shang wu:

1. The gender of the wu is not determined. (Note: Many academics contend that the wu of the Shang was a female.)
2. The character could denote both the name for a function and the name of a particular person or group of people.
3. The wu occasionally presided over several divination rituals.
4. The wu is seen as offering a sacrifice of appeasement, but it was not always the one chosen to carry out this activity, which the king and other staff also participated in.
5. The wu follows (being brought, presumably, to Shang territory or court) the orders of other people; it is perhaps offered to the Shang as a tribute.
6. After death, the wu was worshipped by the Shang together with regular spirits.
7. Inducing the spirits to send down rain was the most important practice of the wu. If they failed to do this and harvest damage was imminent, the last resort was to sacrifice the wu themselves by burning.

The fact that the wu was offered to the Shang suggests a non-Shang origin of this figure. The sinologist Victor H. Mair examined the wu by looking at evidences from outside of China. He proposed a connection between the wu and the ancient Mesopotamian magus, whose ancient pronunciations resemble each other. (Note: Mair identifies the Old Chinese pronunciation of wu as m^{y}ag, with regards to phonetic transcriptions from Bernhard Karlgren, Zhou Fagao, Li Fang-kuei, and Axel Schuessler.) Mair then suggested that since the magus were not shamans, the wu should be perceived as those who communicated with spirits via means of arts and ritual rather than shamanic practices. David Keightley also rejected the conflation of wu with shamans.

=== Astronomers and dancers ===
Shang character for 'dancer' (舞), depicting a dancer holding plumes

七日己未斲庚申月又食

On the seventh day jǐwèi (day 56) cleaving into gēngshēn (day 57), the moon was eaten.

— Oracle bone Heji 40610v.

The Shang utilized astronomers to make observations they deemed necessary for religious activities. Shang astronomers observed celestial objects such as Mars, and comets, and they were also aware of Antares, which they referred to as the Fire Star. Chinese literature after the Shang dynasty mentioned Shang astronomers such as Wuxian, who allegedly composed a star map. The Grand Historian of the Han dynasty, Sima Qian, stated in the Shiji that he took Wuxian's celestial map as a source to identify the residence of the Shang high god on the sky. The degree to which Shang astronomers contributed to religious beliefs and practices is difficult to define; however, it is possible that such astronomical knowledge formed the basis for Shang religious cosmology.

Shang ritual music involved dancers, and the ancient character denoting them suggests that they danced with oxtails. Shang dancers These dancers also likely wore animal masks, whose designs were imitated on Shang bronzes. It is possible that dances represented the main practice of the Shang religion prior to the emergence of oracle bone inscriptions.

== Non-royal adherents ==
The main corpus of oracle texts made by the king's entourage is augmented by smaller amounts of inscriptions from the princely lineages. These consist of four groups, commonly called the 'non-king divinations'. Three are named after their notable diviners, and the remaining one features inscriptions with no particular diviner identified. All four serve as descriptions of religious practice not sanctioned directly by the king, but by the ennobled lineage leaders with familial ties to him. These inscriptions seem to indicate that the non-royal adherents focused their worship on ancestors who did not become kings, as well as peculiar spirits that might be only worshipped privately by these non-king lineages.

=== Huayuanzhuang lineage adherents ===
One among the four groups, identified as inscriptional records left by a Shang prince during the reign of Wu Ding, provides by far the most rigorous documentation of lineage religious activities. This person was identified to be a relative of Wu Ding who administered a Shang-conquered land called Rong. His identity attracted multiple theories, with various scholars identifying him as a son of Wu Ding, or a brother of him, or instead a descendant of the 14th dynastic ancestor Wo Jia. His texts, now excavated at the Huayuanzhuang East site, comprise about 500 separate inscribed bones.

The patron commissioned additional constructions serving for worship, including an ancestral temple, a tower, and a guesthouse intended to store sacrifices. (Note: A bone in the corpus, designated HYZ 82, records that the patron's entourage also conducted sacrifices in this guesthouse.) There is evidence that his lineage temple complex was designed in a way that resembled the Zhou dynasty's spatial zhaomu system. Inscriptions on the Huayuanzhuang oracle bones indicate significant differences between the prince's lineage divination practices and that of the royal apparatus. For example, his diviners extensively specified the time of divination within a day and almost always included in their inscriptions the phrases 'used' and 'not used', unseen in the royal inscriptions. Despite the distinctions, the cult recipients mentioned by the prince's entourage are the same as those worshipped by the central authorities.

The Huayuanzhuang prince worshipped a range of spirits. He particularly built a cult around 'Ancestress Geng', who was identified as Wu Ding's mother in royal texts:

己亥卜：子于(戎)宿，夙殺牢妣庚。用。

Divined on jihai: Our lord, staying overnight in Rong, at dawn will kill some pen-raised cattle (for) Ancestress Geng. Used.

— HYZ 267

戊申卜：其將妣庚于(戎)東官(館)。用。

Divined on wushen: Should carry in offerings (to) Ancestress Geng in Rong's eastern guesthouse. Used.

癸丑，將妣庚，其歲妣庚牢。在(戎)。_{一二三}

On guichou, carrying in offerings (to) Ancestress Geng, should sacrifice (to) Ancestress Geng some pen-raised cattle. At Rong._{123}

— HYZ 248

The prince frequently reported to Ancestress Geng about his sickness and dreams; if exorcism was necessary, it would be performed to this ancestress together with the prince's great-grandmother Ji. Other ancestral deities revered by the Huayuanzhuang entourage include those worshipped by the king, particularly Shang Jia (a Predynastic Shang ancestor), 'Ancestor Yi' (Xiao Yi), 'Ancestor Jia' (Yang Jia), 'Ancestor Xin' (Xiao Xin), 'Ancestor Geng' (Pan Geng), and 'Ancestor Ding' (Zu Ding). One spirit that he worshipped was probably not an ancestor but rather his own son, who died early. It also appears that the prince, while worshipping many common ancestors with the royal schools, rarely paid attention to the Predynastic ancestors as well as spirits of nature like Yue (the Mountain Power) and He (the River Power). The Shang high god Di and the Former Lords worshipped in the royal tradition were never mentioned in Huayuanzhuang inscriptions.

Divinations of the Huayuanzhuang prince concerned weather patterns similar to that of the king, but did not attempt to influence them. The prince divined about rains in contexts of hunting and travelling, but he did not pray for the rains themselves. He also concerned warfare, commissioning various divinations about battles exhibit similarities to the royal records. The patron was not concerned with harvests.

Inscriptions mention the prince as engaging himself in the participation and supervision of rituals. He himself personally acted as diviner in twenty-six different inscriptions. He possessed the right to prognosticate like the king, and in many cases his predictions were verified in inscriptions. In many rituals he appeared to make a prayer, and sometimes he would personally preside over an exorcism to ensure safety to his staff. (Note: It was also known through the Huayuanzhuang oracle bones that some people in the prince's staff could conduct exorcism for him. For instance, an inscription designated HYZ 284 concerns whether archer-lord Dian should carry out exorcism for his lord.) Although he entrusted many people to conduct sacrifices on his behalf, in some occasions he directly made sacrifices to the spirits, as one text indicates:

乙卯卜：歲祖乙牢，子其自，弜(勿)速。用。

Divined on yimao: In sacrificing (to) Ancestor Yi some pen-raised cattle, our lord should do it himself; (he) ought not invite (anyone else). Used.

— HYZ 294

Like his contemporary king Wu Ding, the prince also presided over a team of specialized diviners under his personal control. Wu Ding maintained a close connection with his son in terms of religion, sending sacrificial materials to Rong and assigning a royal official to safeguard the prince remotely. Some of Wu Ding's own diviners might have also been active in the Huayuanzhuang diviner teams. Oracle bones also record the involvement of brothers and cousins, who seemed to take the protagonist as leader. According to inscriptions, these individuals included:

1. Zi Hua, an entrusted cousin of the patron who held the second highest status and was the only one chosen to conduct rituals on behalf of the prince;
2. Zi Pou and Zi Yu, two cousins of the prince who participated in sacrificial ceremonies to ancestors of the nearest generations; and
3. Zi Hu and Zi Bi, who were associated with rituals involving dance and music.

=== Other lineage practitioners ===
Non-royal inscriptions other than the Huayuanzhuang texts are also characterized by descriptions of religious activities that, while being similar to royal practices, exhibited independent features. The general practices embraced by these groups are assumed to be the same as that of the Huayuanzhuang lineage. Two particular inscription groups, named Wu and Zi, refer to numerous cult recipients that are never mentioned in the royal records. Some of them are listed as below:

Spirits receiving sacrfices in Wu and Zi inscriptions
Diviner group	Name of cult recipients
Wu 午	Zu Ren 祖壬, Fu Ding 父丁, Fu Ji 父己, Fu Bing 父丙, Bi Yi 妣乙, Zi Geng 子庚, Nei Yi 內乙, Wai Wu 外戊, Shi Jia 石甲, Tian Geng 天庚
Zi 子	The 'Many Ladies' (zhufu 諸婦); Long Jia 龍甲, Long Mu 龍母, Si Gui 司癸, Xiao Ji 小己

A notable inscription, namely the Zi group's Heji 19849, describe ancestral rituals performed by a prince or head of a lineage to two ancestors, one of which was the founder of the Shang dynasty. The inscription on this bone suggests that the rituals performed were comparably similar to the king's school, particularly the Shi group. In some cases the diviners exhibit a delicate, feminine writing on ancestress-related topics, indicating that these diviners were themselves female or they may have operated under the supervision of a queen or a king's consort.

It is also these non-king records that document the lineages' use of white animals for the exorcism ritual. This is also observed in the royal inscriptions, notably the Li-group ones. In some cases, the lineage patron himself conducted the exorcism rite to several clan members; for example, inscriptions from the Wu group record the patron carried out exorcism for ancestors Zi Geng, Xiong Geng, Fu Ding, and Fu Wu.

Some of the lineage heads, particularly Zi Yu, only worshipped ancestors within two previous generations. Lineage leaders named Qin, Bing, Cha, Gu, and Qiao – leaders at the frontier of the Shang state who were able to control their own multitudes – worshipped more senior ancestors, indicating that they were descendants of such distant generations.

== Evidence for specialist training ==
=== Scribal training ===
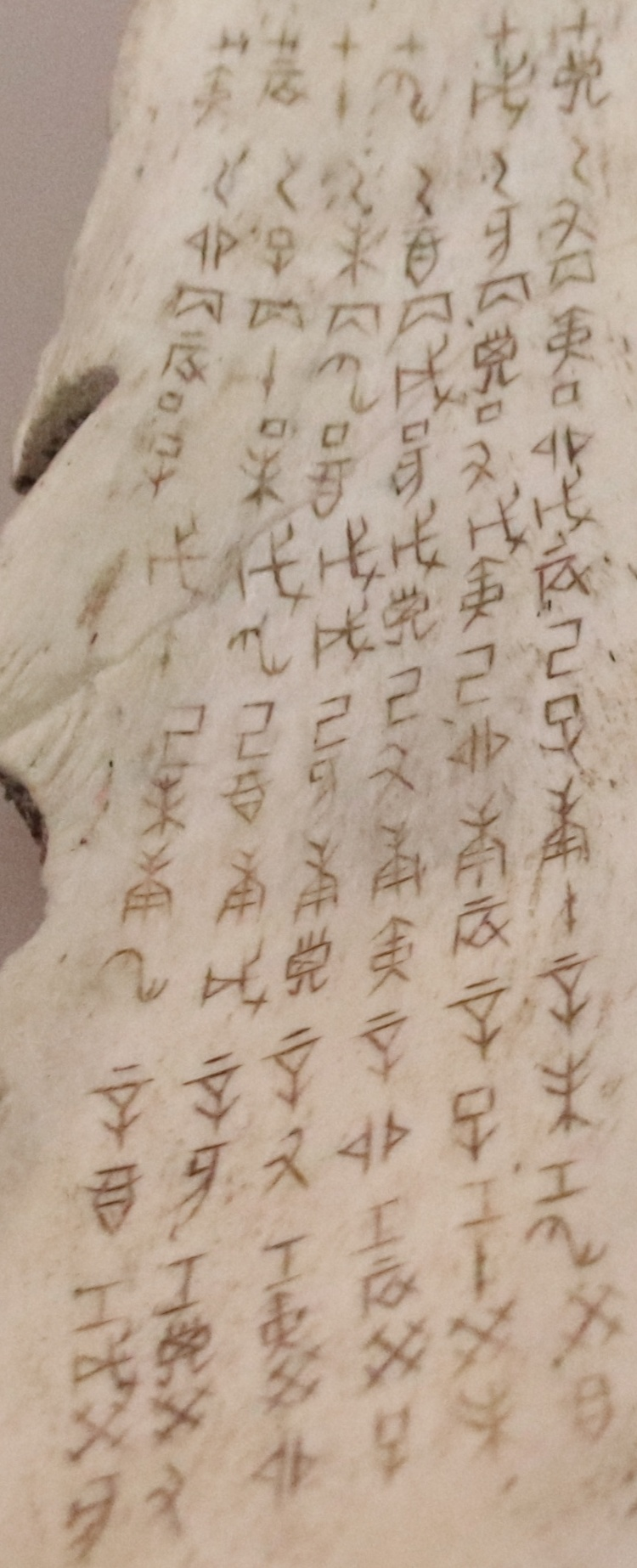
Table of the sexagenary cycle from the reigns of the last two Shang kings, inscribed on a scapula

The complex nature of the Shang oracle bone script indicates a level of training necessary for scribes to acquire literacy. Robert Bagley noted that the process of acquiring full literacy for Shang scribes is not understood.

The Shang character for 'learn' (xué 學) has been identified and determined to be both a verb and a noun. For example, some inscriptions reveal that when the word is used in collocation with 'great' (大), the resulting phrase could refer to an alternative place for performing an unknown ritual. Xué could possibly be a noun in HD: 181 (wǎngxué 往學 'to go to the xué') and in HD: 450 (rùxué 入學 'to enter the xué'), but these examples could equally be verbs. The character may also refer to a kind of 'school', and it is generally believed that the Shang might have had some kinds of institutionalized training locations for religious teaching.

Within the complex corpus of Anyang inscriptions are a set called xike (習刻), literally meaning 'practice engraved'. This group consists of atypical inscriptions that exhibit incompetent writings and other features, indicating that the scribe was not recording divinations but rather practicing the skills required for that purpose. A notable content of xike writings is the sexagenary (ganzhi) table used as the Shang religious calendar. Examining these as an example, academics such as Matsumaru Michio theorized that the tables are divided to those used as models and others as student writing practice.

The content consists of the ganzhi for days 1 to 10 engraved repeatedly. In the fourth line of text, the graphs are finely written and orderly, as though engraved by a teacher (xiānshēng 先生) to serve as a model (fànbĕn 範本). The rest are crooked and inferior, as though written by someone learning to engrave (xuékè 學刻). This is no different from the method by which today's children practice writing (xízì 習字). Shedding light on the educational circumstances of three thousand years ago, it is of the utmost interest. Furthermore, interspersed within the columns written by the trainee are finely written graphs identical to those of the model, where presumably the attendant teacher took up the knife. Examples include the 辰，庶, and 申 of the second line and the 卯, 己, and 辛 of the third.

— Guo Moruo's description of xike writing

The Chinese sinologist Guo Moruo was the first to note down characteristics of this writing in 1937. Guo considered the xike set to be examples of literacy training for future specialists. Later scholars argued for an alternative explanation in which the 'students' writing the xike were already literate and were intended to practice engraving techniques. This interpretation later became the general consensus. It also seem to indicate that scribes might have received literacy training on media other than oracle bones that have long faded away.

A particular example of learning inscriptions is the bone with designation number Heji 26907. The preface of its inscription reads:

己巳卜彭貞...
Day 6 cracking, Peng divined...

— HJ 26907

This inscription belongs to the He divination group's workshop. The real divinatory record on the bone was well-written except for this preface, which was probably inscribed by a person allowed to do so. That individual was likely diviner Peng, who may have also been learning divination practice as well. The rest of the bone inscription was fragmented, disorderly, and not compliant with usual standards. Two of these additional texts appear to be Peng's own work.

=== Training other ritual activities ===
The records of the Huayuanzhuang prince indicate a form of dance schooling. In five inscriptions, the word 'learn' comes with 'shang' (商), speculated to denote a form of dance. There are inscriptions about continuing to perform 'shang', and there is an oracle bone anticipating Wu Ding's inspection of this practice.

== History and development ==
=== Neolithic precursors ===
The Longshan culture, where ancestor worship rituals were practiced.

Before the dawn of organized states in China, the area was inhabited by various tribal confederations which shared religious practices based on ideas of animism, totemism and shamanism. (Note: Some prehistoric Chinese cultures produced artifacts that bear the "AZ" motif, which represented some kind of a "High God" similarly to the Shang dynasty's spirits.) The spirits were thought to possess divine powers and were able to intervene in the living realm. That led to the necessity of direct communication with the spirits, through means of mystics. A group of specified individuals referred to as shamans arose and took responsibility for conducting their respective tribe's religious rituals. In many regions of China, Neolithic cultures had utilized bony materials from cattle for divination. Many cultures also sought to communicate with spirits via prayers, grave goods and animal sacrifice.

Archaeological evidence indicates that music culture developed in China from a very early period. Excavations in Jiahu Village in Wuyang County, Henan found bone flutes dated to 8,000 years ago, and clay music instruments called Xun thought to be 6,000 years old have been found in the Hemudu sites in Zhejiang and Banpo in Xi'an.

=== Dong Zuobin's diviner chronological theory ===
Throughout the late Shang dynastic course when written materials came in abundance, several distinct scribal groups existed and often intermingled. Their style, calligraphy and inscriptional contents are comparably different. 20th century Chinese scholars, most prominently Dong Zuobin, divided the diviners into two groups referred to as the 'Old School' and the 'New School'. According to Dong's periodization, since the religious reforms commissioned by Zu Jia during the 12th century BCE, these two groups had experienced periods of high activity alternating with times in which they were not favored. The Old School diviners used to work under Wu Ding and Zu Geng, but later replaced by the New School established by Zu Jia. Dong contended that the succeeding reigns were characterized by interchanging employment of either school, ending with the last two kings Di Yi and Di Xin returning to the New School. Dong also identified major distinctions between the two groups, including calendar recording, writing styles, divination topics, and even the materials selected for divination. Although the theory has once been prevalent among academics, it was once challenged by alternatives; these include a Japanese interpretation which distinguished non-royal inscriptions from the corpus, and more recently a Chinese one that concentrated on the archaeological aspect of oracle bones.

Tang of Shang, as depicted by Ma Lin

=== During the Zhou dynasty ===
Around 1046 BCE, the Shang dynasty collapsed and was succeeded by the Zhou dynasty. (Note: According to David Pankenier, the Zhou overlord Ji Fa defeated the last Shang king on 20 January 1046 BCE, marking the end of the old regime.) The early Western Zhou period (c. 11th century BCE) kept the old Shang religious practices by revering Shang spirits. Early Zhou oracle bones found in Zhouyuan contain inscriptions concerning Di Yi, one of the last Shang kings who used to be worshipped by the Shang people.

King Wu of Zhou, the first king of the new royal family, enfranchised the Shang prince Wu Geng and allowed him to continue worshipping Shang spirits. After King Wu's death, Wu Geng rebelled together with the Three Guards, but was defeated and killed by the royal army. The Zhou dynasty enfeoffed another Shang prince, titled Weizi, as ruler of Song; Weizi's lineage continued the old ancestral worship. Shu Yi, a high official of the state of Qi around 600 BCE, was a direct descendant of the Shang. He owned a bronze artifact named 'Shu Yi Zhong' to memorialize his royal Shang ancestral spirits.

== Traditional narrative ==
Many Chinese dynasties that ruled after the Shang composed various texts that mention alleged Shang religious practitioners. For example, Chinese tradition describes the first Shang king, Tang, as a man who "observed the taboos, cut his hair, broken his nails, [and] offered himself as a sacrifice" to save his endangered country. Traditional texts also refer to counsels on Shang religious matters, such as Yi Yin's teachings to Tai Jia, along with Zu Ji and Fu Yue remonstrating with Wu Ding. (Note: Zu Ji appears in Shang oracle inscriptions under the name Jie, while post-Shang texts often refer to him as Xiao Ji.) (Note: This chapter's name in the Book of Documents contain Wu Ding's alleged posthumous name. This causes some to suspect that the event described did not take place during Wu Ding's reign but rather after he died, and Zu Ji might have been remonstrated with Zu Geng instead.) The last Shang king, Di Xin, was described by the Zhou dynasty as a ruler who completely neglected religious affairs and contributed to the fall of the Shang.
