= Nan (diviner) =

Prominent Shang dynasty diviner

Nan 𬆩
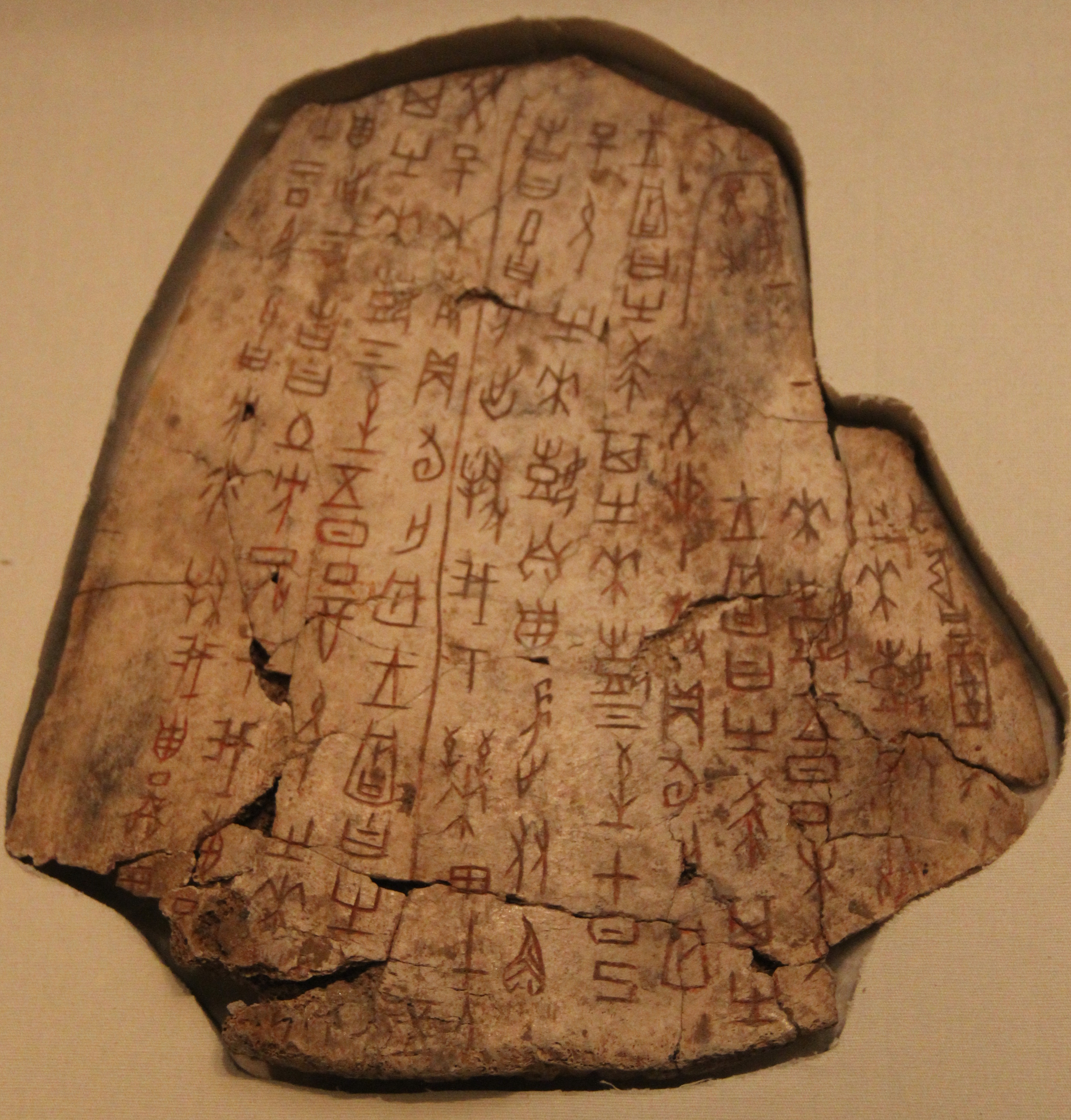
- Oracle bone inscription on Ox scapula by Nan about disasters during a war with the Gongfang (𢀛方).
- Born: c. 12th Century B.C. Shang dynasty
- Occupation: Shang dynasty diviner
- Known for: Extensive ritual contributions Old Chinese dialect evidence

Nan
- Nan in regular script.
- Chinese: 𬆩
Transcriptions
Standard Mandarin
- Hanyu Pinyin: nán
- Bopomofo: ㄋㄢˊ
- Wade–Giles: nan^{2}
Middle Chinese
- Middle Chinese: nom
Old Chinese
- Baxter–Sagart (2014): /*nˤ[ə]m/
- Zhengzhang: /*nuːm/

Nan (𬆩, also written as Que 㱿) was a Shang dynasty diviner who served Wu Ding in the Late Shang period. They (Note: Nan's gender is not known.) are known for their ritual activity in and outside of Yin and performing among the highest amounts of oracle bone divinations of any diviner, which has made them an ample source of linguistic data, as well as a useful marker for dating oracle bone inscriptions.

== Name ==
Que 㱿 is a common and conventional representation of Nan's name, but palaeographic evidence shows that the actual representation is Nan 𬆩 ⿰南殳, a phono-semantic compound using 南 as the phonetic component. Similar evidence is used for the reading of Fu Hao's 好 name as Fu Zi, using 子 as the source for reading.

== Life ==
Little is known about Nan's personal life; all that can be derived comes from what is written on oracle bones and the context around them. They were a member of the bin 賓 group of diviners, along with Zheng 爭, an equally prominent individual in the sphere. Out of all 17 diviners reviewed in the Bingbian 丙編 collection of oracle bone transcriptions, Nan was found to have divinated more than any other individual, moreso than even Zheng and Bin 賓. According to the Lexicon of Pre-Qin Oracle and Bronze Inscriptions and Bamboo Scripts, Nan appears 2360 times in the corpus.

Given Nan's occasional erring in terms of handwriting in oracle bone script, as well as consistent differences in word order in their recorded words, theories have emerged that they may not have been a Yin native. However, due to a lack of bronzeware declaring their name, their homeland remains a mystery. As Nan's name uses nan 南 "south," should this theory be correct, it suggests that they may have been from the southern areas of Shang and thus spoke a southern dialect. There is also evidence of Nan having associations with li 曆 group scribes given the handwriting of guiyou 癸酉 in red on the obverse of Heji 4284, whereas on the reverse, Nan divinates in bin fashion. Fringe theories have placed Nan in the Gufang 穀方, but these are "fraught with issues," especially given that the Gufang was an enemy of the Shang state during Nan's time.

== Career ==
The divinations Nan took part in were sometimes major. One details a charge about whether to use the Xingfang sending Qiang as sacrifices for Shang Jia among the Six Spirits:

壬寅卜𬆩貞興方以羌用自上甲至下乙
On the renyin day, plastromancy was performed. Diviner Nan charges: If the Xingfang bring Qiang people for use, should we use them in sacrifices from Shang Jia down to Xia Yi?

Among the most famous oracle bone inscriptions involves Nan divinating about potential disasters with Wu Ding after receiving a report, which came to pass when the Gongfang (𢀛方) invaded Shang borders.

Nan would also consult ancestors regarding childbirth, on one occasion doing so four times for Wu Ding to ensure a birth happened on a geng 庚 day, which would be associated with good fortune. On another occasion, Wu Ding would predict a ding 丁 day for the birth one of Fu Zi's children, only for the birth to occur on a jiayin 甲寅 day, and be a girl, and thus not a suitable heir.

Additionally, there would be many occasions where Nan divinates regarding omens for the ruler, as well as whether rain will occur.

Nan is among few individuals who would participate in divination outside of Yin, with at least 13 documented occasions shown within a corpus of 313 oracle bones, 5 of which were exorcisms of Shang ancestors. It also shows that Nan did not actively participate in what would be described as cult activity within the Shang royal lineage; however, they did, on at least one occasion, perform a posthumous ce sacrifice to Wu Ding. Additionally, several of their inscriptions would go on to be used as sample texts for diviners to transcribe in Yin workshops during the days of Lin Xin and Geng Ding, such as the then-young diviner Peng, giving some of the earliest examples of scribal education in China.
