= Oracle bone =

Shells and bones used for divination in ancient China

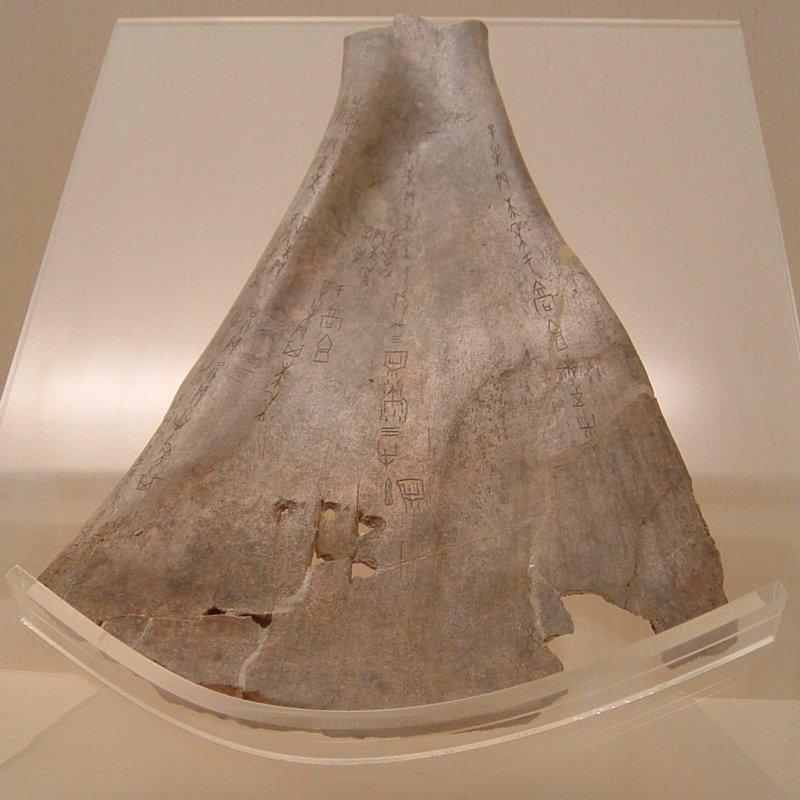
- A Shang dynasty oracle bone from the Shanghai Museum
- Chinese: 甲骨
- Literal meaning: Shell and bone
Transcriptions
Standard Mandarin
- Hanyu Pinyin: Jiǎgǔ
- Wade–Giles: Chia^{3}-ku^{3}
- IPA: [tɕjǎ.kù]
Wu
- Romanization: Chiaʔ-kueʔ
Hakka
- Romanization: Gap^{5}-gut^{5}
Yue: Cantonese
- Yale Romanization: Gaap-gwāt
- Jyutping: Gaap3 gwat1
Southern Min
- Tâi-lô: Kah-kut (col.); Kap-kut (lit.)

Oracle bones are pieces of ox scapula and turtle plastron which were used in pyromancy – a form of divination – during the Late Shang period (c. 1250 – c. 1050 BCE) in ancient China. Scapulimancy is the specific term if ox scapulae were used for the divination, plastromancy if turtle plastrons were used. A recent count estimated that there were about 13,000 bones with a total of a little over 130,000 inscriptions in collections in China and some fourteen other countries.

Diviners would submit questions to deities regarding weather, crop planting, the fortunes of members of the royal family, military endeavors, and similar topics. These questions were carved onto the bone or shell in oracle bone script using a sharp tool. Intense heat was then applied with a metal rod until the bone or shell cracked due to thermal expansion. The diviner would then interpret the pattern of cracks and write the prognostication upon the piece as well. Pyromancy with bones continued in China into the Zhou dynasty, but the questions and prognostications were increasingly written with brushes and cinnabar ink, which degraded over time.

Oracle bones bear the earliest known significant corpus of ancient Chinese writing, using an early form of Chinese characters. (Note: A tiny number of isolated mid to late Shang pottery, bone and bronze inscriptions may predate the oracle bones. However, the oracle bones are considered the earliest significant body of writing due to the length of the inscriptions, the vast amount of vocabulary (roughly 4000 graphs), and the sheer quantity of pieces found – at least 160,000 pieces bearing millions of characters. There are also inscribed or brush-written Neolithic signs in China, but they do not generally occur in strings of signs resembling writing, instead appearing singly. Whether or not these signs constitute writing or are ancestral to the Shang writing system is currently a matter of great academic controversy. They are also insignificant in number compared to the massive amounts of oracle bones found thus far.) The inscriptions contain around 5,000 different characters, many of which are still being used today, though the total number of discrete characters is uncertain as some may be different versions of the same character. Specialists have agreed on the form, meanings, and sound of a little more than a quarter of the characters, roughly 1,200 with certainty, but several hundred more remain under discussion; these known characters comprise much of the core vocabulary of modern Chinese. They provide important information on the late Shang period, and scholars have reconstructed the Shang royal genealogy from the cycle of ancestral sacrifices recorded on oracle bones. (Note: Chou 1976, p. 12 cites two such scapulae, citing his own "商殷帝王本紀" Shāng–Yīn dìwáng bĕnjì, pp. 18–21.) When they were discovered at the end of the nineteenth century and deciphered in the early twentieth century, these records confirmed the existence of the Shang, whose historicity had been subject to scrutiny at the time by the Doubting Antiquity School.

Oraculology is the discipline for the study of oracle bones and the oracle bone script.

== Discovery ==
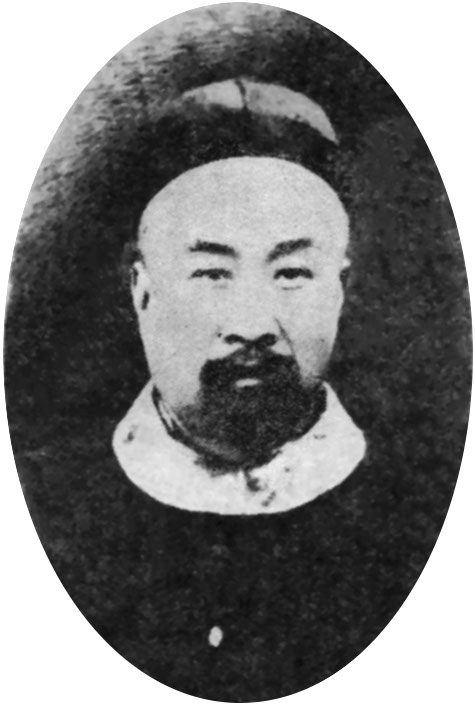
Wang Yirong, Chinese politician and scholar, was the first to recognize the oracle bones as ancient writing.

Shang-era oracle bones are thought to have been unearthed occasionally by local farmers since as early as the Sui and Tang dynasties, and perhaps starting as early as the Han dynasty. In Sui and Tang era Anyang, which was at one time the capital of the Shang dynasty, oracle bones were exhumed during burial ceremonies, though grave diggers did not realize what the bones were and generally reinterred them. During the 19th century, villagers in the area who were digging in the fields discovered a number of bones, and used them as dragon bones, following the traditional Chinese medicine practice of grinding up Pleistocene fossils into tonics or poultices. The turtle shell fragments were prescribed for malaria, (Note: Xu 2002, pp. 4–5 cites The Compendium of Materia Medica and includes a photo of the relevant page and entry.) while the other animal bones were used in powdered form to treat knife wounds.

In 1899, an antiques dealer from Shandong who was searching for Chinese bronzes in the area acquired a number of oracle bones from locals, and later sold several to Wang Yirong, the chancellor of the Imperial Academy in Beijing. Wang was a knowledgeable collector of Chinese bronzes, and is believed to be the first person in modern times to recognize the oracle bones' markings as ancient Chinese writing similar to that on Zhou dynasty bronzes. A legendary tale relates that Wang was sick with malaria, and his scholar friend Liu E was visiting him and helped examine his medicine. They discovered that, before being ground into powder, the bones bore strange glyphs which, having studied the ancient bronze inscriptions, they recognized as ancient writing. Xu Yahui states that, "[n]o one can know how many oracle bones, prior to 1899, were ground up by traditional Chinese pharmacies and disappeared into people's stomachs."

It is not known how Wang and Liu actually came across these specimens, but Wang is credited with being the first to recognize their significance. During the Boxer Rebellion, Wang reluctantly accepted a defense command, and killed himself in 1900 when allied troops entered Beijing. His son later sold the bones to Liu, who published the first book of rubbings of the oracle bone inscriptions in 1903. As news of the oracle bones' discovery spread throughout China and among foreign collectors and scholars the market for the bones exploded, though many collectors sought to keep the location of the bones' source a secret. Although scholars tried to find their source, antique dealers falsely claimed that the bones came from Tangyin in Henan. In 1908, scholar Luo Zhenyu discovered the source of the bones near Anyang and realized that the area was the site of the last Shang dynasty capital.

Decades of uncontrolled digs followed to fuel the antiques trade, (Note: Xu 2002, p. 6 cites eight waves of illegal digs over three decades, with tens of thousands of pieces taken.) and many of these pieces eventually entered collections in Europe, the United States, Canada, and Japan. The first Western collector was the American missionary Frank H. Chalfant (1862–1914). (Note: Rev. Chalfant acquired 803 oracle bone pieces between 1903 and 1908, and hand-traced over 2500 pieces including these.) Chalfant called the script "inscriptions upon bone and tortoise shell" in his 1906 book Early Chinese Writing. The Chinese equivalent jiǎgǔwén 甲骨⽂ appeared in the following decades.

Only a small number of dealers and collectors knew the location of the source of the oracle bones until they were found by Canadian missionary James Mellon Menzies, the first person to scientifically excavate, study, and decipher them. He was the first to conclude that the bones were records of divination from the Shang dynasty, and was the first to come up with a method of dating them (in order to avoid being fooled by fakes). In 1917 he published the first scientific study of the bones, including 2,369 drawings and inscriptions and thousands of ink rubbings. Through the donation of local people and his own archaeological excavations, he acquired the largest private collection in the world, over 35,000 pieces. He insisted that his collection remain in China, though some were sent to Canada by colleagues who were worried that they would be either destroyed or stolen during the Japanese invasion of China in 1937. The Chinese still acknowledge the pioneering contribution of Menzies as "the foremost western scholar of Yin-Shang culture and oracle bone inscriptions". His former residence in Anyang was declared a "Protected Treasure" in 2004, and the James Mellon Menzies Memorial Museum for Oracle Bone Studies was established.

== Official excavations ==
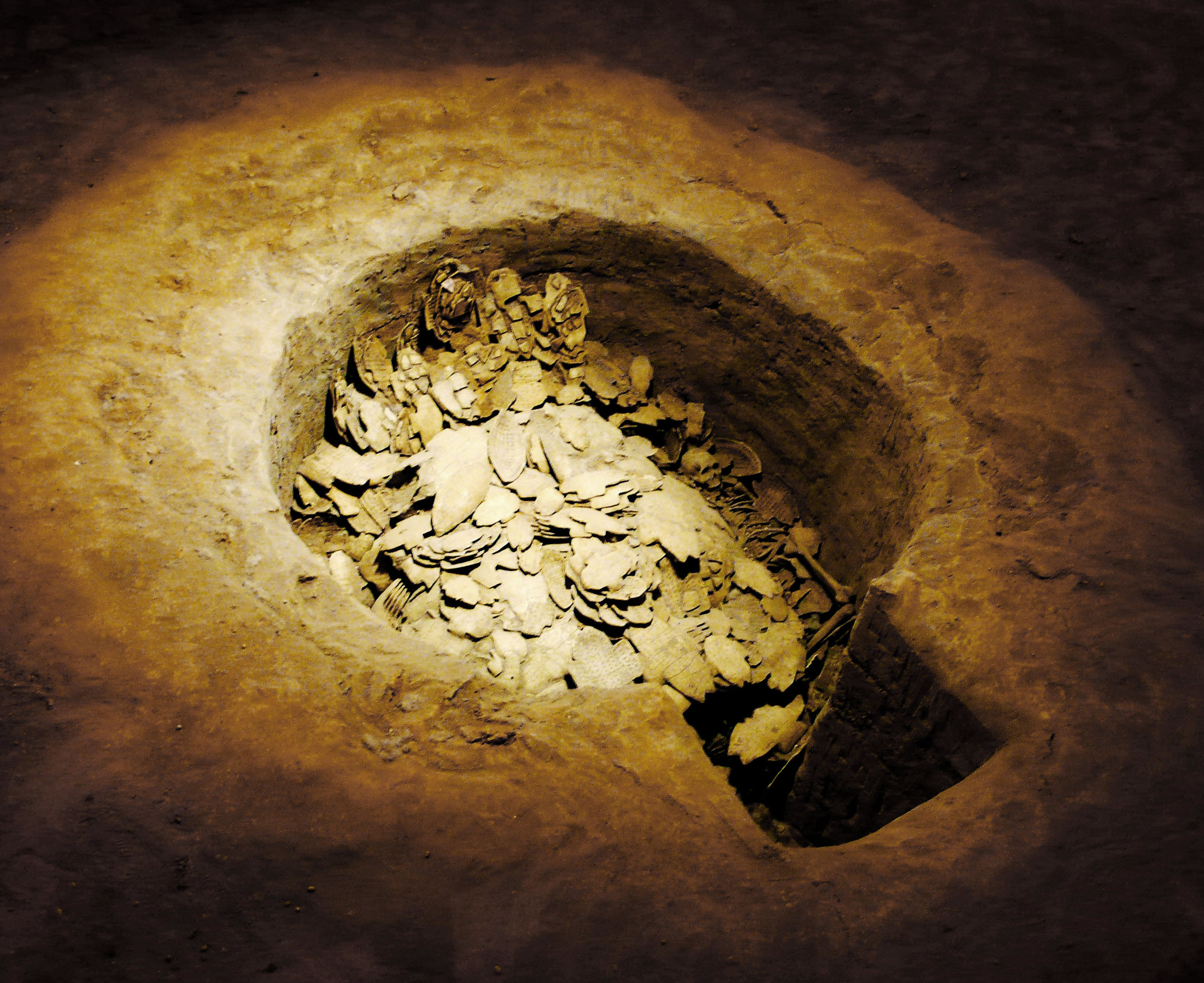
Reconstruction of oracle bone pit YH127 at Yinxu

By the time of the establishment of the Institute of History and Philology by Fu Sinian at the Academia Sinica in 1928, the source of the oracle bones had been traced back to modern Xiaotun (小屯村) village at Anyang in Henan. Official archaeological excavations led by Li Ji, the father of Chinese archaeology, between 1928 and 1937 discovered 20,000 oracle bone pieces, which now form the bulk of the Academia Sinica's collection in Taiwan and constitute about 1/5 of the total discovered. (Note: over 100,000 pieces have been found in total.) The major archaeologically excavated pits of bones have been:

- Pit YH127 in Xiaotun North (1936), with over 17,000 inscribed pieces.
- Xiaotun South (1977–1979), with 4,612 inscribed pieces.
- Huayuangzhuang East (1991), with 561 inscribed pieces.

When deciphered, the inscriptions on the oracle bones were revealed to be records of the divinations performed for or by the royal household. These, together with royal-sized tombs, (Note: Eleven royal-sized tombs were found. This exactly matches the number of kings who should have been buried at Yin (the 12th king died in the Zhou conquest and would not have received a royal burial).) proved beyond a doubt for the first time the existence of the Shang dynasty, which had recently been doubted, and the location of its last capital, Yin. Today, Xiaotun at Anyang is thus also known as the Ruins of Yin, or Yinxu.

== Publication ==
Oracle bone inscriptions were published as they were discovered, in fascicles. Subsequently, many collections of inscriptions were also published. The following are the main collections.

- 殷墟文字甲編; Yinxu wenzi jiabian
- 殷墟文字乙編; Yinxu wenzi yibian
- 殷墟文字丙編; Yinxu wenzi bingbian
- 殷虛書契前編; Yin xu shu qi qian bian
- 集殷虛文字楹帖彙編; Ji Yin xu wen zi ying tie hui bian
- 殷墟萃編; Yinxu cuibian
- 后上; Houshang
- 后下; Houxia
- 粹編; Cuibian
- 殷虛書契續編; yīn xū shū qì xù biān
- 亀甲; Kikkō
- 殷契摭佚續編; Yinqizhiyi xubian
- 殷契遺珠; Yinqi yizhu
- 京都大學人文科学研究所蔵甲骨文字; Kyōto daigaku jimbunkagaku kenkyūshozō kōkotsumoji
- 殷契佚存; Yiqi yicun
- 甲骨綴合編; Jiagu zhuihebian
- 鐵雲藏龜拾遺; Tieyun canggui shiyi
- 戰後京津新獲甲骨集; Zhanhou Jingjin xinhuo jiaguji (1954)
- 殷墟文字存真; Yinxu wenzi cunzhen
- 戰後寧滬新獲甲骨集; Zhanhou Ninghu xinhuo jiaguji (1951)

Observing that the citation of these different works was becoming unwieldy, historians Hu Houxuan and Guo Moruo began an effort to comprehensively publish all bones discovered by the mid-1950s. The result, the Jiaguwen Heji (1978–1982) was edited by Houxuan and Guo Moruo and, (Note: The Heji was published between 1978 and 1982 by the Zhonghua Publishing House. Somewhat unusually, the work was credited to Guo Moruo (郭沫若) as 主編 and Hu Houxuan (胡厚宣) as 总编辑. Both terms are translated into English as 'chief editor' or 'editor-in-chief'. The project of a creating comprehensive catalog of oracle bone inscriptions was proposed in the early 1950s by Guo, who served as the first president of the Chinese Academy of Sciences (CAS) from 1949 to 1978. Hu was transferred from Fudan University to the CAS in 1956 for the purpose of editing the Heji, and was in charge of the day-to-day editorial activity of the Heji when the project officially began in 1961, with Guo playing an advisory role. Guo died in 1978.) with its supplement (1999) edited by Peng Bangjiong, is the most comprehensive catalogue of the oracle bone fragments. The 20 volumes contain reproductions of over 55,000 fragments. A separate work published in 1999 contains transcriptions of the inscriptions into standard characters.

== Dating ==
Ox scapula recording divinations by Zhēng 爭 during the reign of king Wu Ding

The vast majority of the inscribed oracle bones were found at the Yinxu site in modern Anyang and date to the reigns of the last nine Shang kings. The diviners named on the bones have been assigned to five periods by Dong Zuobin:

| Period | Kings | Common diviners |
|---|---|---|
| I | Wu Ding (Note: Dong also included kings Pan Geng, Xiao Xin and Xiao Yi. However, few or perhaps no inscriptions can be reliably assigned to pre-Wu Ding reigns. Many scholars assume that earlier oracle bones from Anyang exist but have not yet been found.) | nán 𬆩, Bīn 賓, Zhēng 爭, Xuān 宣 |
| II | Zu Geng, Zu Jia | Dà 大, Lǚ 旅, Xíng 行, Jí 即, Yǐn 尹, Chū 出 |
| III | Lin Xin, Kang Ding | Hé 何 |
| IV | Wu Yi, Wen Wu Ding | |
| V | Di Yi, Di Xin | |

The kings were involved in divination in all periods, with divinations in later periods done personally by the king. The extant inscriptions are not evenly distributed across these periods, with 55% coming from period I and 31% from periods III and IV. A few oracle bones date to the beginning of the subsequent Zhou dynasty.

The earliest oracle bones (corresponding to the reigns of Wu Ding and Zu Geng) record dates using only the 60-day cycle of stems and branches, though sometimes the month was also given. Attempts to determine an absolute chronology focus on a number of lunar eclipses recorded in inscriptions by the Bīn group, who worked during the reign of Wu Ding, possibly extending into the reign of Zu Geng. Assuming that the 60-day cycle continued uninterrupted into the securely dated period, scholars have sought to match the recorded dates with calculated dates of eclipses. There is general agreement on four of these, spanning dates from 1198 to 1180 BCE. A fifth is assigned by some scholars to 1201 BCE. From this data, the Xia–Shang–Zhou Chronology Project, relying on the statement in the "Against Luxurious Ease" chapter of the Book of Documents that the reign of Wu Ding lasted 59 years, dated it from 1250 to 1192 BCE. American sinologist David Keightley argued that the "Against Luxurious Ease" chapter should not be treated as a historical text because it was composed much later, presents reign lengths as moral judgements, and gives other reign lengths that are contradicted by oracle bone evidence. Estimating an average reign length of 20 years based on dated Zhou reigns, Keightley proposed that Wu Ding's reign started around 1200 BCE or earlier. Ken-ichi Takashima dates the earliest oracle bone inscriptions to 1230 BCE. 26 oracle bones throughout Wu Ding's reign have been radiocarbon dated to 1254–1197 BCE (±10 years) with an estimated 80-90% probability of containing the true individual ages.

Period V inscriptions often identify numbered ritual cycles, making it easier to estimate the reign lengths of the last two kings. The start of this period is dated 1100–1090 BCE by Keightley and 1101 BCE by the Xia–Shang–Zhou project. Most scholars now agree that the Zhou conquest of the Shang took place close to 1046 or 1045 BCE, over a century later than the traditional date.

== Shang divination ==
Since divination was by heat or fire and most often on plastrons or scapulae, the terms pyromancy, plastromancy (Note: According to Keightley 1978a, p. 5, citing Yang Junshi 1963, the term plastromancy (from plastron + Greek μαντεία, "divination") was coined by Li Ji.) and scapulimancy are often used for this process.

=== Materials ===
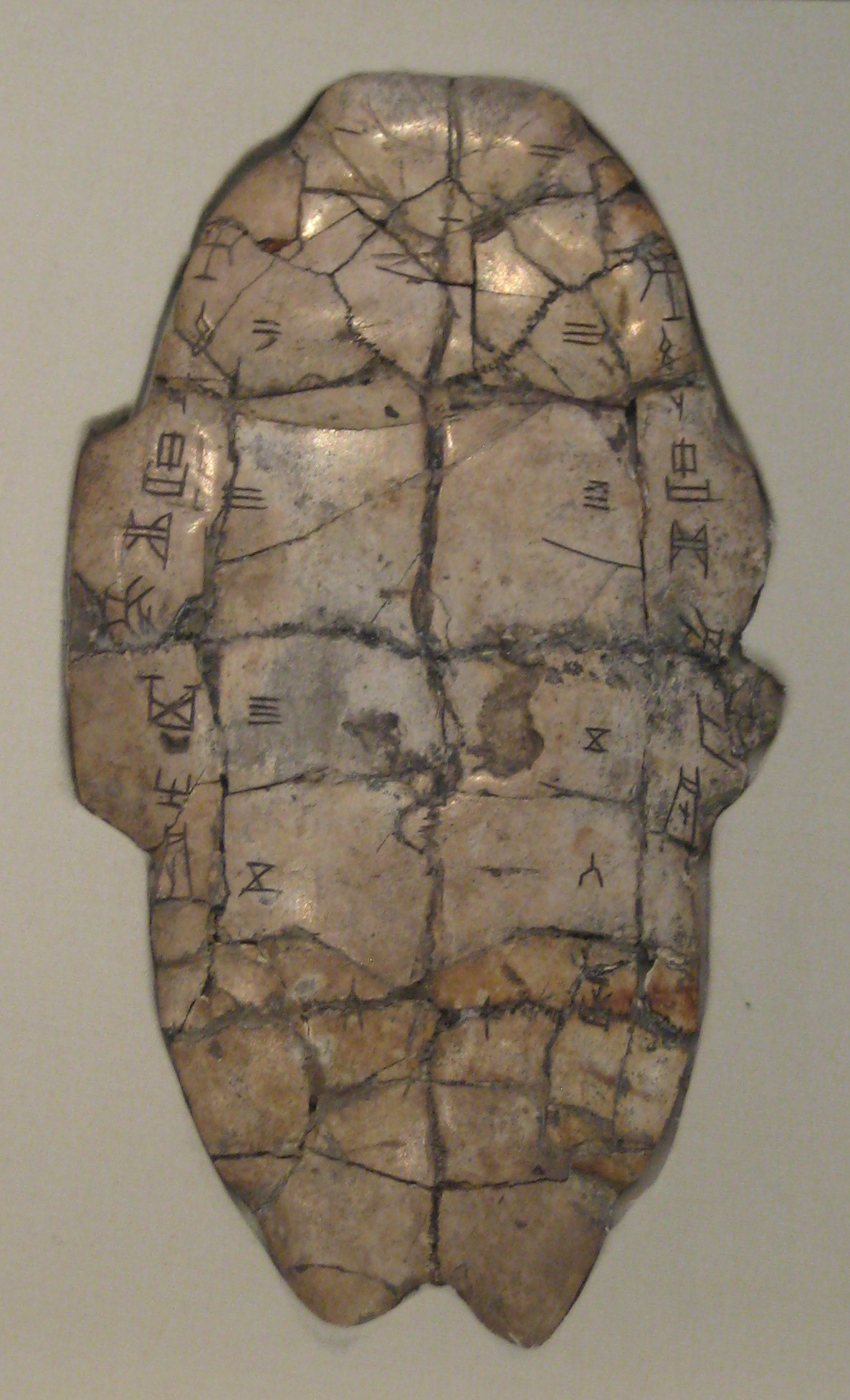
Tortoise plastron with divination inscription

The oracle bones are mostly turtle plastrons, probably female (Note: Keightley 1978a, p. 9 – the female shells are smoother, flatter and of more uniform thickness, facilitating pyromantic use.) and ox scapulae, although there are also examples of tortoise carapaces, ox rib bones, (Note: According to Chou 1976, p. 7, only four rib bones have been found.) the scapulae of sheep, boars, horses, and deer, and other various animal bones. (Note: such as ox humerus or talus bone.) The skulls of deer, oxen, and humans have also been found with inscriptions on them, (Note: Xu 2002, p. 34 shows a large, clear photograph of a piece of inscribed human skull in the collection of the Institute of History and Philology at the Academia Sinica, Taiwan, presumably belonging to an enemy of the Shang.) although these are very rare and appear to have been inscribed for record keeping or practice rather than for actual divination; (Note: There appears to be some confusion in published reports between inscribed bones in general, and bones that have actually been heated and cracked for use in divination.) in one case, inscribed deer antlers were reported, but Keightley reports that they are fake. (Note: Xu 2002, p. 35 does show an inscribed deer skull, thought to have been killed by a Shang king during a hunt.) Interestingly, tortoises are not native to the areas oracle bones were discovered and thus it is theorized they were presented to the region as tribute. Neolithic diviners in China had long been heating the bones of deer, sheep, pigs, and cattle for similar purposes; evidence for this in Liaoning has been found dating to the late fourth millennium BCE. However, over time, the use of ox bones increased, and use of tortoise shells does not appear until early Shang culture. The earliest tortoise shells found that had been prepared for divinatory use (i.e., with chiseled pits) date to the earliest Shang stratum at Erligang (modern Zhengzhou). By the end of the Erligang, the plastrons were numerous, and at Anyang, scapulae and plastrons were used in roughly equal numbers. Due to the use of these shells in addition to bones, early references to the oracle bone script often used the term "shell and bone script", but since tortoise shells are actually a bony material, the more concise term "oracle bones" is applied to them as well. Examples of turtle species used in divination include Mauremys reevesii, Mauremys sinensis, Pelodiscus sinensis, and Mauremys mutica. In addition to domestic cattle, now-extinct taxa such as Bubalus mephistopheles and Bos primigenius have also been observed.

The bones or shells were first sourced and then prepared for use. Their sourcing is significant because some of them (especially many of the shells) are believed to have been presented as tribute to the Shang, which provides valuable information about diplomatic relations of the time. We know this because notations were often made on them recording their provenance (e.g., tribute of how many shells from where and on what date). For example, one notation records that "Què (雀) sent 250 (tortoise shells)", identifying this as, perhaps, a statelet within the Shang sphere of influence. (Note: Some cattle scapulae were also tribute.) These notations were generally made on the back of the shell's bridge (called bridge notations), the lower carapace, or the xiphiplastron (tail edge). Some shells may have been from locally raised tortoises, however. (Note: Keightley 1978a, p. 12 mentions reports of Xiǎotún villagers finding hundreds of shells of all sizes, implying live tending or breeding of the turtles onsite.) Scapula notations were near the socket or a lower edge. Some of these notations were not carved after being written with a brush, proving (along with other evidence) the use of the writing brush in Shang times. Scapulae are assumed to have generally come from the Shang's own livestock, perhaps those used in ritual sacrifice, although there are records of cattle sent as tribute as well, including some recorded via marginal notations.

=== Preparation ===
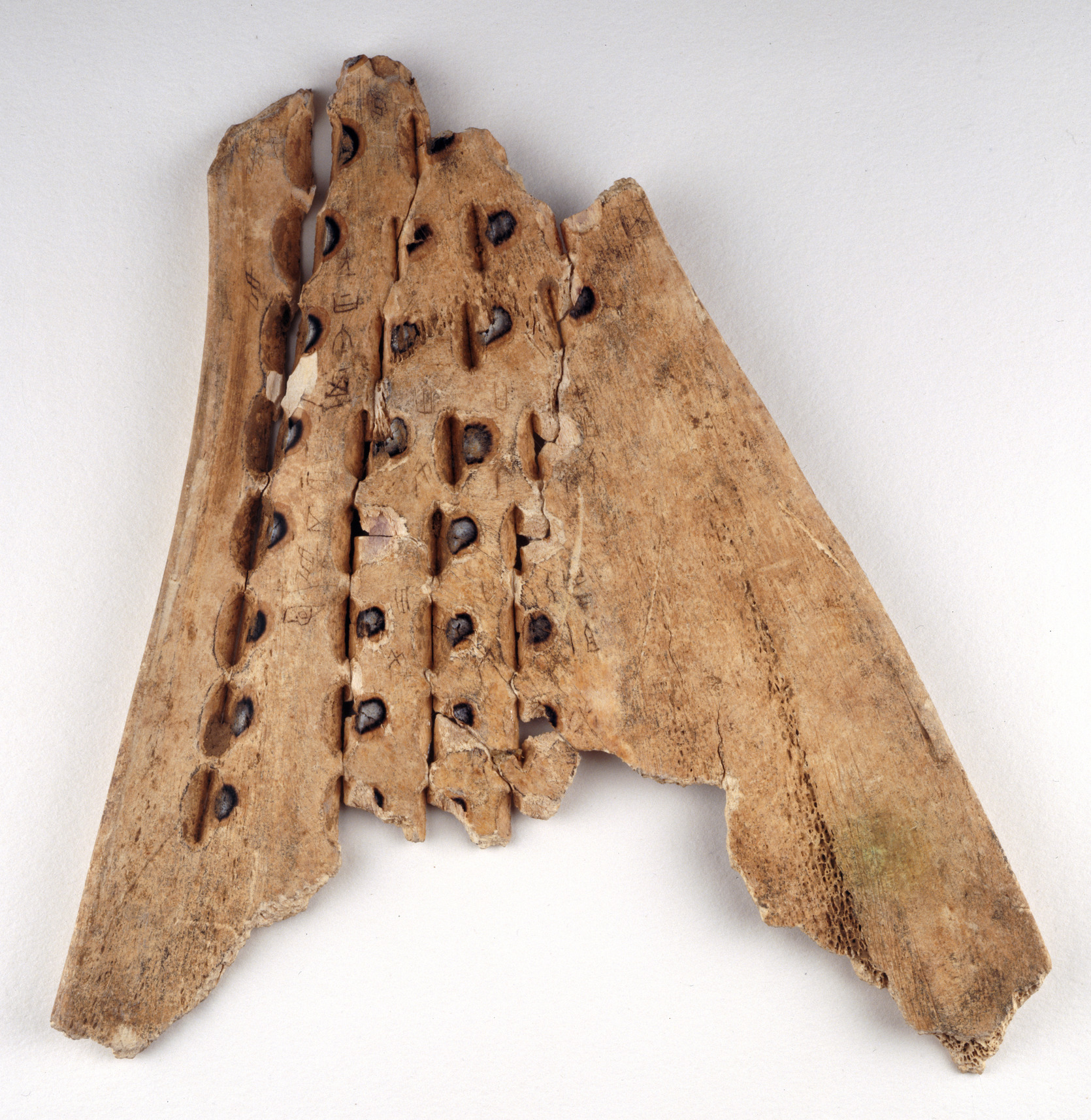
Holes drilled into an oracle bone

The bones or shells were cleaned of meat and then prepared by sawing, scraping, smoothing, and even polishing to create flat surfaces. (Note: Chou 1976, p. 12 notes that evidence of sawing is present on some oracle bones, and that the saws were likely made of bronze, although none have ever been found.) The predominance of scapulae, and later of plastrons, is also thought to be related to their ease of use as large, flat surfaces that needed minimal preparation. There is also speculation that only female tortoise shells were used, as these are significantly less concave. Pits or hollows were then drilled or chiseled partway through the bone or shell in an orderly series. At least one such drill has been unearthed at Erligang, exactly matching the pits in size and shape. The shape of these pits evolved over time, and is an important indicator for dating the oracle bones within various sub-periods in the Shang dynasty. The shape and depth also helped determine the nature of the crack that would appear. The number of pits per bone or shell varied widely.

=== Cracking and interpretation ===
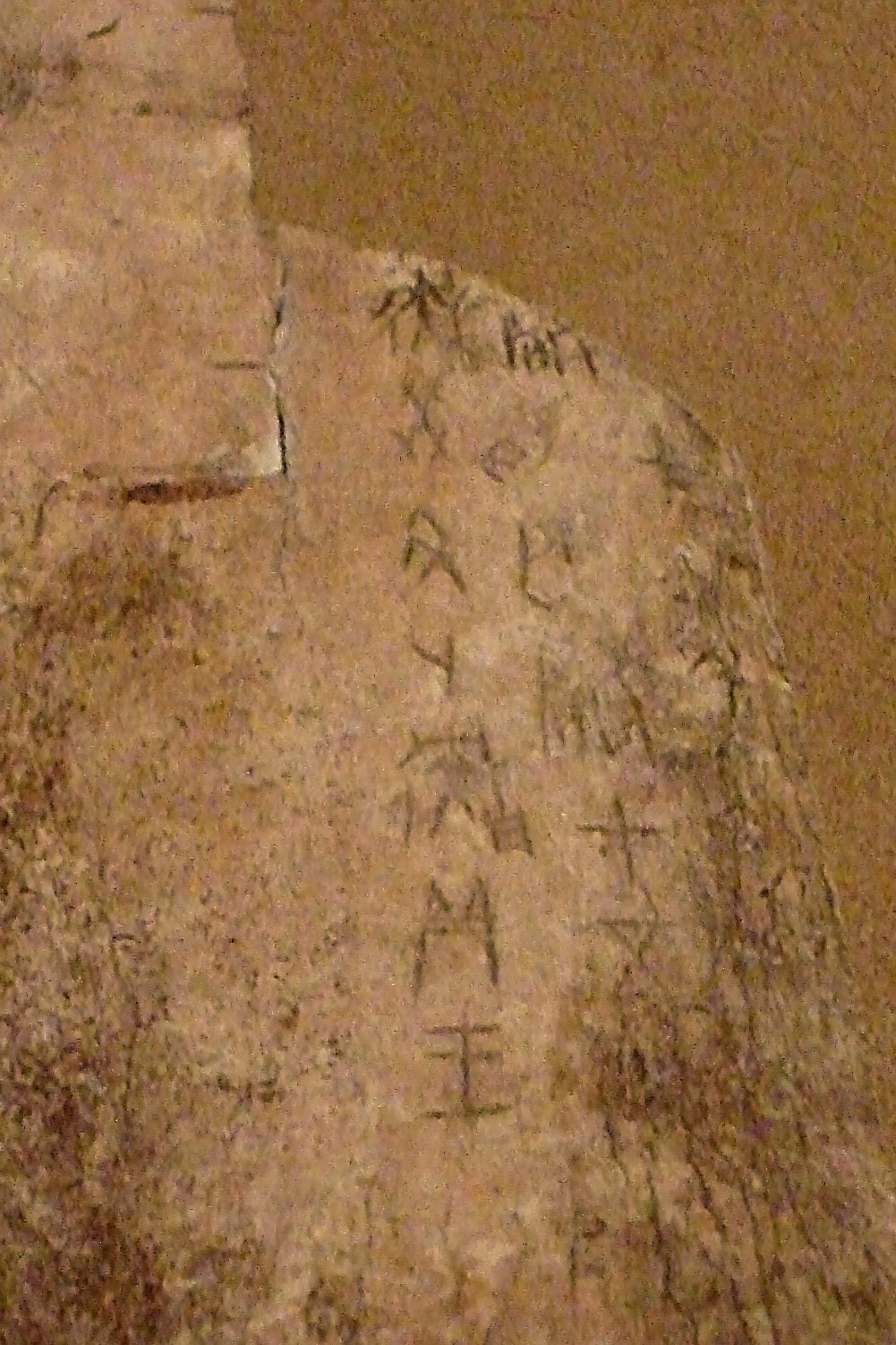
In this Shang-era oracle bone (which is incomplete), a diviner asks the Shang king if there would be misfortune over the next ten days; the king replied that he had consulted the ancestor Xiao Jia in a worship ceremony.

Divinations were typically carried out for the Shang kings in the presence of a diviner. Very few oracle bones were used in divination by other members of the royal family or nobles close to the king. By the latest periods, the Shang kings took over the role of diviner personally.

During a divination session, the shell or bone was anointed with blood and, in an inscription section called the "preface", the date was recorded using the Heavenly Stems and Earthly Branches, along with the diviner's name. Next, the topic of divination (called the "charge") was posed, (Note: There is scholarly debate about whether the topic was posed as a question or not; Keightley prefers the term "charge", since grammatical questions were often not involved.) such as whether a particular ancestor was causing a king's toothache. The divination charges were often directed at ancestors, whom the ancient Chinese revered and worshiped, as well as natural powers and Dì (帝), the highest god in the Shang society. Anything of concern to the royal house of Shang served as possible topics for charges, from illness, birth and death, to weather, warfare, agriculture, tribute and so on. One of the most common topics was whether performing rituals in a certain manner would be satisfactory. (Note: For a fuller overview of the topics of divination and what can be gleaned from them about the Shang and their environment, see Keightley 2000.)

An intense heat source (Note: The nature of this heat source is still a matter of debate.) was then inserted in a pit until it cracked. Due to the shape of the pit, the front side of the bone cracked in a rough 卜 shape. The character卜 (bǔ or pǔ; Old Chinese: *puk; 'to divine') may be a pictogram of such a crack; the reading of the character may also be an onomatopoeia for the cracking. A number of cracks were typically made in one session, sometimes on more than one bone, and these were typically numbered. The diviner in charge of the ceremony read the cracks to learn the answer to the divination. How exactly the cracks were interpreted is not known. The topic of divination was raised multiple times, and often in different ways, such as in the negative, or by changing the date being divined about. One oracle bone might be used for one session or for many, (Note: Most full (non-fragmentary) oracle bones bear multiple inscriptions, the longest of which are around 90 characters long.) and one session could be recorded on a number of bones. The divined answer was sometimes then marked either "auspicious" or "inauspicious", and the king occasionally added a "prognostication", his reading on the nature of the omen. On very rare occasions, the actual outcome was later added to the bone in what is known as a "verification". A complete record of all the above elements is rare; most bones contain just the date, diviner and topic of divination, and many remained uninscribed after the divination.

The uninscribed divination is thought to have been brush-written with ink or cinnabar on the oracle bones or accompanying documents, as a few of the oracle bones found still bear their brush-written divinations without carving, (Note: Qiu 2000, p. 60 mentions that some were written with a brush and either ink or cinnabar, but not carved.) while some have been found partially carved. After use, shells and bones used ritually were buried in separate pits (some for shells only; others for scapulae only), (Note: Those that were for practice or records were buried in common rubbish pits.) in groups of up to hundreds or even thousands (one pit unearthed in 1936 contained over 17,000 pieces along with a human skeleton).

=== Changes in the nature of divination ===
The targets and purposes of divination changed over time. During the reign of Wu Ding, diviners were likely to ask the powers or ancestors about things like the weather, success in battle, or building settlements. Offerings were promised if they would help with earthly affairs.

Crack-making on jiazi (day 1) Zheng divined "In praying for harvest to the sun, (we) will cleave ten dappled cows, and pledge one hundred dappled cows."
(Heji 10116; Y530.2)

Keightley explains that this divination is unique in being addressed to the sun, but typical in that 10 cattle are being offered, with 100 more to follow if the harvest is good. Later divinations were more likely to be perfunctory, optimistic, made by the king himself, addressed to his ancestors, on a regular cycle, and unlikely to ask the ancestors to do anything. Keightley suggests that this reflects a change in ideas about what the powers and ancestors could do, and the extent to which the living could influence them.

== Evidence of pre-Anyang pyromancy ==
While the use of bones in divination has been practiced almost globally, divination involving fire or heat has generally been found only in Asia and the Asian-derived North American cultures. The use of heat to crack scapulae (pyro-scapulimancy) originated in ancient China, the earliest evidence of which extends back to the 4th millennium BCE with archaeological finds from Liaoning, though these were not inscribed. The scapulae of cattle, sheep, pigs, and deer used in pyromancy have been found at neolithic archeological sites, and the practice appears to have become quite common by the end of the third millennium BCE. Scapulae were unearthed along with smaller numbers of pitless plastrons in the Nánguānwài (南關外) stage at Zhengzhou; scapulae as well as smaller numbers of plastrons with chiseled pits were also discovered in the lower and upper Erligang stages.

Significant use of tortoise plastrons does not appear until the Shang culture sites. Ox scapulae and plastrons, both prepared for divination, were found at the Shang culture sites of Táixīcūn (台西村) in Hebei and Qiūwān (丘灣) in Jiangsu. One or more pitted scapulae were found at Lùsìcūn (鹿寺村) in Henan, while unpitted scapulae have been found at Erlitou in Henan, Cixian (磁縣) in Hebei, Níngchéng (寧城) in Liaoning, and Qijia (齊家) in Gansu. Plastrons do not become more numerous than scapulae until the Rénmín (人民) Park phase.

== Other sites ==
Four inscribed bones have been found at Zhengzhou: three with numbers 310, 311, and 312 in the Hebu corpus, and one that has a single character (ㄓ), which also appears in late Shang inscriptions. HB 310, which contained two brief divinations, has been lost, but is recorded in a rubbing and two photographs. HB 311 and 312 each contain a pair of characters that are similar to the late Shang script. HB 312 was found in an upper layer of the Erligang culture. The others were found accidentally in river management earthworks, and so lack archaeological context. Pei Mingxiang argued that they predated the Anyang site. Takashima, referring to character forms and syntax, argues that they were contemporaneous with the reign of Wu Ding.

A turtle plastron bearing several short inscriptions was found at Daxinzhuang in Shandong on the floor of a semi-subterranean house dating from the Late Shang period. The style of characters is close to that used by particular diviner groups active at Anyang during the reign of Wu Ding, though it shows some variations.

Nearly 300 inscribed oracle bones (HB 1–290) were found in 1977 in two pits dug into a building foundation at Qijia, Fufeng County, Shaanxi, part of the Zhou ritual centre known as the Zhōuyuán. Some of these are believed to be contemporaneous with the reign of Di Xin, the last Shang king, and others to date from the early Western Zhou. The inscriptions are distinguished from those of Anyang in the way the bones and shells were prepared and used, the smallness of the characters, the presence of unique vocabulary, and the use of the phases of the moon as a dating device. Four pieces (HB 1, 12, 13 and 15) have been particularly puzzling, because they refer to sacrifices in the temples of Shang ancestors, and also differ from the other bones in calligraphy and syntax. Scholars disagree on whether they were produced at Anyang or the Zhouyuan, and whether the diviners and scribes were Shang or Zhou.

In 2003, around 600 inscribed bones were found at Zhougong Miao, a temple dedicated to the Duke of Zhou during the Tang dynasty, about 18 km (11 mi) west of Qijia. They mention the Duke of Zhou and other figures of the early Western Zhou. A handful of oracle bones have been found at other Western Zhou sites, including some from Beijing.

== After the Shang ==
After the founding of Zhou, the Shang practices of bronze casting, pyromancy, and writing continued. Oracle bones that were found in the 1970s have been dated to the Zhou dynasty, with some dating to the Spring and Autumn period; very few, however, were inscribed. It is thought that other methods of divination supplanted pyromancy, such as numerological divination using milfoil (yarrow) in connection with the hexagrams of the I Ching, leading to the decline of inscribed oracle bones. However, evidence for the continued use of plastromancy exists for the Eastern Zhou, Han, Tang, and Qing dynasty periods, and Keightley mentions its use in Taiwan as late as 1972.

Pyromancy is described in the earliest historical records of Japan; it may have been loaned entirely from China, or partially indigenous. The Records of the Three Kingdoms attest to deer-bone scapulimancy among the Wa, and the Nara classics Kojiki and Nihon Shoki are in agreement. However, there is no indication of plastromancy until the early Heian, at which point it became standard. The clan name Urabe (卜部) means "divining caste", and this clan did indeed hold a monopoly on divination for Imperial purposes. Today, Japan is the only place in the world where pyro-plastromancy is still practiced.

== See also ==
- Kau Cim
- Jiaobei
- Tung Shing
- Futomani
- Bamboo and wooden slips
