= Yinxu =

Site of the last capital of the Shang dynasty

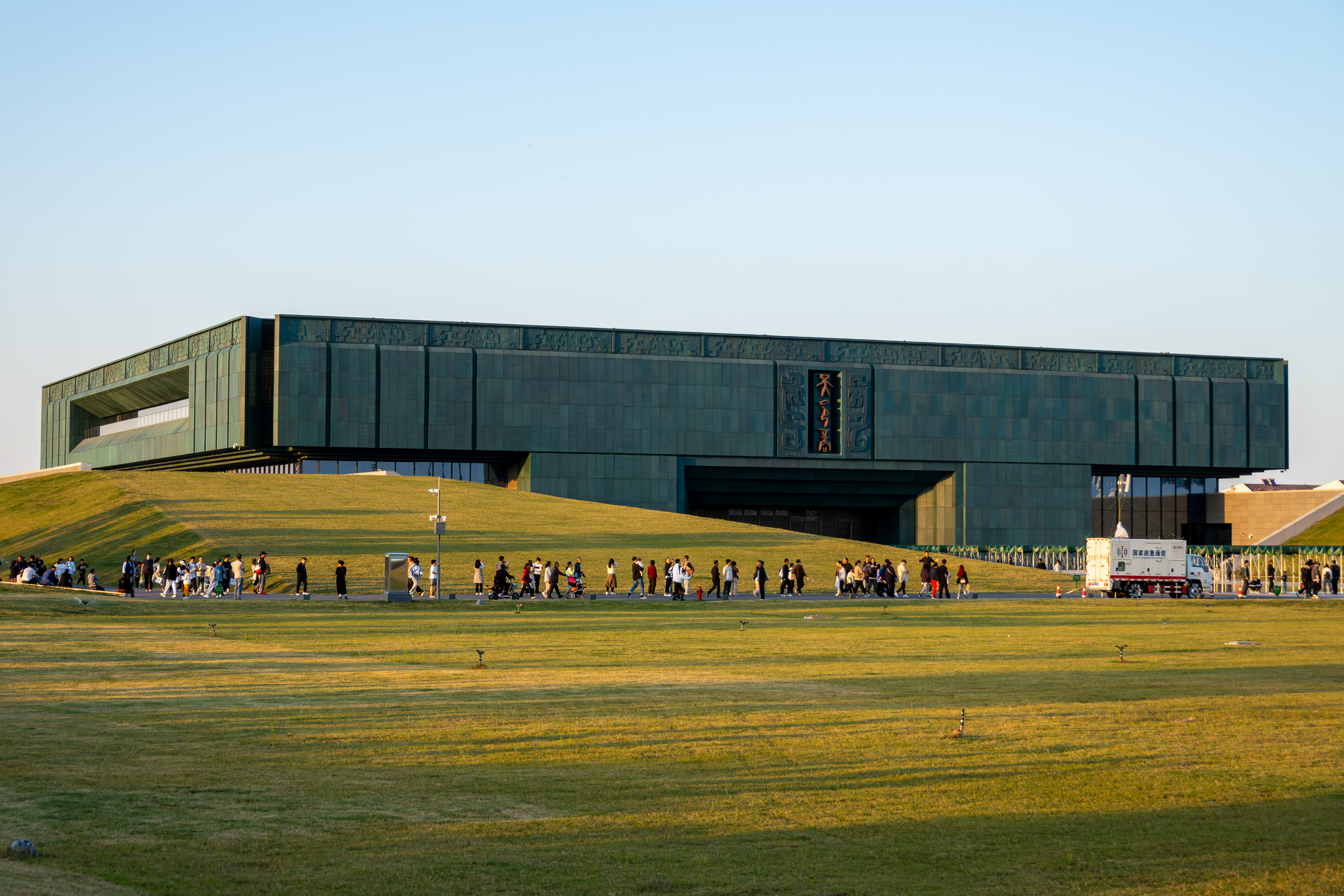
- Yinxu Museum

- Location within Henan Location within China
- 36°07′21″N 114°19′07″E
- Location: Yindu District, Anyang, Henan, China

UNESCO World Heritage Site
- Official name: Yin Xu
- Criteria: Cultural: ii, iii, iv, vi
- Reference: 1114
- Inscription: 2006 (30th Session)
- Area: 414 ha (1,020 acres)
- Buffer zone: 720 ha (1,800 acres)

Yinxu
- Yin (殷) in oracle bone script
- Chinese: 殷墟
- Literal meaning: "Ruins of Yin"
Transcriptions
Standard Mandarin
- Hanyu Pinyin: Yīnxū
- Wade–Giles: Yin^{1}-hsü^{1}
- IPA: [ín.ɕý]
Yue: Cantonese
- Yale Romanization: Yānhēui
- Jyutping: Jan1 heoi1
Southern Min
- Tâi-lô: Ûn-hi

Alternative Chinese name
- Chinese: 大邑商
- Literal meaning: Great City of Shang
Transcriptions
Standard Mandarin
- Hanyu Pinyin: Dà Yì Shāng
- Bopomofo: ㄉㄚˋ ㄧˋ ㄕㄤ
Middle Chinese
- Middle Chinese: dajH 'ip sjang
Old Chinese
- Baxter–Sagart (2014): /*lˤat-s q(r)[ə]p s-taŋ/
- Zhengzhang: /*daːds qrɯb hljaŋ/

Yinxu (Mandarin pronunciation: [ín.ɕý]; Chinese: 殷墟; lit. 'Ruins of Yin') is a Chinese archaeological site corresponding to Yin, the final capital of the Shang dynasty (c. 1600 – c. 1046 BCE). Located in present-day Anyang, Henan, Yin served as the capital during the Late Shang period (c. 1250 – c. 1046 BCE) which spanned the reigns of 12 Shang kings and saw the emergence of oracle bone script, the earliest known Chinese writing. Along with oracle bone script and other material evidence for the Shang's existence, the site was forgotten for millennia. Its rediscovery in 1899 resulted from an investigation into oracle bones that were discovered being sold nearby. The rediscovery of Yinxu marked the beginning of decades of intensive excavation and study. It is one of China's oldest and largest archaeological sites, and was selected by UNESCO as a World Heritage Site in 2006. Yinxu is located in northern Henan, near modern Anyang and the borders Henan shares with Hebei and Shanxi. Public access to the site is permitted.

== Traditional history ==
Rammed-earth foundations of the palace of Yin

According to the 2nd century Shuowen Jiezi dictionary (說文解字), the Chinese character "殷" (yīn) originally referred to "vibrant music-making". Although frequently used throughout written history to refer to both the Shang dynasty and its final capital, the name Yīn (殷) appears to have not been used in this way until the succeeding Zhou dynasty. In particular, the name does not appear in the oracle bones, which refer to the state as Shāng (商), and its final capital as Dàyì Shāng (大邑商 "Great Settlement Shang").

Among surviving ancient Chinese historical documents, Yin is described as the final capital of the Shang dynasty. There is some disagreement, though, as to when the move to Yin took place. Both the Book of Documents, (specifically, the "Pan Geng" chapter, which is believed to date from the late Spring and Autumn period), and the Bamboo Annals state that Shang king Pan Geng moved the Shang capital to Yin. The Bamboo Annals state, more specifically, that during his reign Pan Geng moved the capital from Yān (奄; present-day Qufu, in present-day Shandong Province), to a site called Běimĕng (北蒙), where it was then renamed to Yīn (殷). (Conversely, according to the Records of the Grand Historian of Sima Qian, Pan Geng moved the Shang capital from a location north of the Yellow River to Bo 亳, the capital of Shang dynasty founder Tang, on the south side of the river—a location inconsistent with the location of Yin.)

Regardless, Yin was clearly established as the Shang capital by the time of Shang king Wu Ding. Wu Ding launched numerous military campaigns from this base against surrounding tribes, thus securing Shang rule and raising the dynasty to its historical zenith.

According to the traditional accounts, later rulers became pleasure-seekers who took no interest in state affairs. Di Xin, the last of the Shang dynasty kings, is particularly remembered for his controversial reign, with accounts worsening as years go by, now regarded as an archetypal tyrannical ruler. His autocratic reign, which included the murder of Ji Li of the Predynastic Zhou, alienated the nobility, until Kings Wen and Wu of Zhou were able to garner support and mount a decades-long campaign to weaken the Shang, culminating in the Battle of Muye, which ended the Shang dynasty entirely.

The Zhou dynasty established their capital at Fenghao near modern-day Xi'an, and Yīn was largely abandoned. The heir to the Shang throne, Wu Geng, was allowed to continue the Shang state religion in Bei, which superseded Yin. Wu Geng would stage a rebellion in the Rebellion of the Three Guards after the death of King Wu, but this would be swiftly quashed under the regency of the Duke of Zhou. The ruins of Yin were mentioned by Sima Qian in his Records of the Grand Historian, more precisely in the Battle of Julu, and described in some detail by Li Daoyuan in his Commentary to the River Classic, published during the Southern and Northern Dynasties period (420–589 CE). Thereafter, the once-great city of Yīn was relegated to legend along with its founding dynasty until its rediscovery in the final years of the Qing dynasty.

== Archaeological discoveries ==
Ox scapula recording divinations by Zhēng 爭 in the reign of King Wu Ding

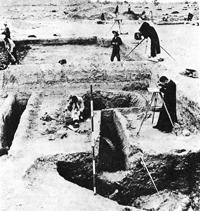
Excavation of Yin, 1930.

Yinxu is well known for its oracle bones, which were first recognized as containing ancient Chinese writing in 1899 by Wang Yirong, director of the Imperial Academy. One account of Wang's discovery was that he was suffering from malaria at the time and was prescribed Longgu (龍骨) (dragon bones) at a traditional Chinese pharmacy. He noticed strange carvings on these bones and concluded that these could be samples of an ancient form of Chinese writing.

News of the discovery of the oracle bones created a market for them among antiques collectors, and led to multiple waves of illegal digs over several decades, with tens of thousands of pieces taken. The source of the "dragon bones" was eventually traced to the small village of Xiaotun, just outside Anyang. In 1910, noted scholar Luo Zhenyu affirmed that the area was the site of the last Shang dynasty capital. Canadian missionary and oracle bone analyst James Menzies also independently identified Anyang as the capital in 1910. In 1917, Wang Guowei deciphered the oracle bone inscriptions of the names of the Shang kings and constructed a complete Shang genealogy. This closely matched that in the Records of the Grand Historian by Sima Qian, confirming the historical authenticity of the legendary Shang dynasty and the archaeological importance of Yinxu. However, the oracle bone inscriptions record the name of the state as Dàyìshāng (大邑商) or Shāngyì (商邑).

The first official archaeological excavations at Yinxu were led by the archaeologist Li Ji of the Institute of History and Philosophy from 1928–37. They uncovered the remains of a royal palace, several royal tombs, and more than 100,000 oracle bones that show the Shang had a well-structured script with a complete system of written signs.

Since 1950 ongoing excavations by the Institute of Archaeology, Chinese Academy of Social Sciences have uncovered evidence of stratification at the Hougang site, remains of palaces and temples, royal cemeteries, oracle bone inscriptions, bronze and bone workshops and the discovery of the Huanbei site on the north bank of the Huan River. One of the largest and oldest sites of Chinese archaeology, excavations here have laid the foundation for work across the country.

Four periods are recognized at the site based on pottery types. They correlate approximately with oracle bone periods assigned by Dong Zuobin, royal reigns and dates assigned by the Xia–Shang–Zhou Chronology Project as follows:

Layer	Oracle bone period	Kings	Approximate dates
Yinxu I			1300–1250 BCE
Yinxu I	I	Wu Ding	1250–1192 BCE
Yinxu II	I	Wu Ding	1250–1192 BCE
Yinxu II	II	Zu Geng, Zu Jia	1191–1148 BCE
Yinxu III	III	Lin Xin, Geng Ding	1191–1148 BCE
Yinxu III	IV	Wu Yi, Wen Wu Ding	1147–1102 BCE
Yinxu IV	V	Di Yi, Di Xin	1101–1046 BCE

For most of Yinxu I, the site was a small settlement. The first large buildings appeared in the later part of the period, together with oracle bone inscriptions, large-scale human sacrifice and chariot burials. Dong also included kings Pan Geng, Xiao Xin and Xiao Yi in his oracle bone period I, but no inscriptions can be reliably assigned to pre-Wu Ding reigns. Some scholars assign these kings to the nearby Huanbei urban site, which was roughly contemporaneous with the early part of Yinxu I. Excavation at the latter site is complicated by the fact that it lies under Anyang airport, and no inscriptions have been found.

== Recent discoveries ==
In a sacrificial pit excavated in 2023 dating to the reigns of Di Yi and Di Xin, close to the time of the Battle of Muye that would end the Shang dynasty, the number of human bones decreased by 67% compared to earlier periods, and more cow and sheep bones were used. The remaining human bones were those of prisoners of war rather than civilians or slaves.

The Xindian Late Shang Bronze Casting Site, Taojiaying Site, Shaojiapeng Site, and other sites that have not been mentioned in recent years have recently been excavated.

== Excavation sites ==
At 30 square kilometers, Yinxu is the largest archaeological site in China. Excavations have uncovered over 80 rammed-earth foundation sites including palaces, shrines, tombs and workshops. From these remains archaeologists have been able to confirm that this was the spiritual and cultural center of the Shang dynasty.

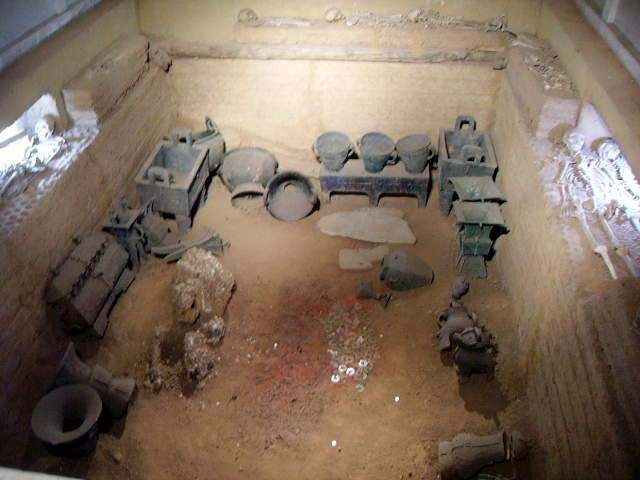
Burial pit at Tomb of Lady Fu Hao

The best preserved of the Shang dynasty royal tombs unearthed at Yinxu is the Tomb of Fu Hao. The extraordinary Lady Hao was a military leader and the wife of Shang King Wu Ding. The tomb was discovered in 1976 by Zheng Zhenxiang and has been dated to 1250 BCE. It was completely undisturbed, having escaped the looting that had damaged the other tombs on the site, and in addition to the remains of the Queen the tomb was discovered to contain six dog skeletons, 16 human slave skeletons, and numerous grave goods of huge archaeological value. The tomb was thoroughly excavated and extensively restored and is now open to the public. The exhibition hall also features chariot pits where the earliest samples of animal-driven carts discovered by Chinese archaeology are on display.

== Historical importance ==
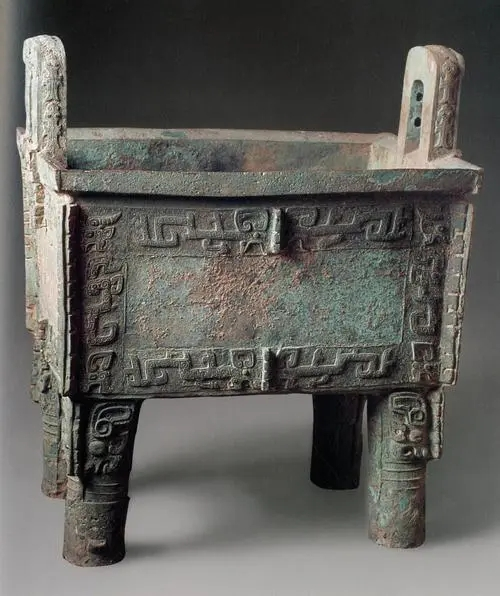
The Houmuwu ding

Before the excavation of Yinxu, the Chinese historical record began in the first year of the subsequent Zhou dynasty, but the discovery of oracle bone inscriptions confirmed the historicity of the Shang, which had come under question. The framework of early ancient Chinese history was reconstructed, making it possible to assess the credibility of traditional accounts of Shang history.

The 150,000 oracle bones unearthed at Yinxu comprise much of the earliest evidence of written Chinese. Bronze and jade relics constitute evidence of the funeral customs of Yinxu, including human and animal sacrifice.

A large number of handicrafts and workshops have been discovered at Yinxu. Patterns on utensils and bronzeware include those resembling animal faces, whorl patterns, and the taotie pattern. Large-scale bronzeware excavated at the site like the Houmuwu ding were cast by an elaborate section-mold process.

== Genetic studies ==
A study of mitochondrial DNA (inherited in the maternal line) from Yinxu graves showed similarity with modern northern Han Chinese, but significant differences from southern Han Chinese.

== Modern developments ==
Yinxu Museum New Building, which opened in 2024, hosts nearly 4000 cultural relics. It adopts technology exhibition forms such as naked eye 3D, XR interaction, and digital oracle bones. It was estimated to receive 140,000 visitors during the National Day holiday in 2025 and generate over 1.8 million yuan.

Anyang is building a "Dayi Business" cultural and tourism cluster, including night tours on the Huan River, 105 oracle bone script bookstores, oracle bone script radio gymnastics, and nearly 800 cultural and creative products. In the first half of 2025, Anyang's tourism revenue was estimated to reach 42.294 billion yuan.

== See also ==
- Periodization of the Shang dynasty
- Historical capitals of China

Preceded by Yan	Primary Capital of China c. 1350 – c. 1046 BC	Succeeded by Fenghao
