= James Mellon Menzies =

Canadian missionary and archaeologist

James Mellon Menzies 明義士
- Born: 23 February 1885; Clinton, Ontario, Canada
- Died: 16 March 1957 (aged 72); Toronto, Canada
- Education: PhD, University of Toronto
- Known for: Collection and research of Chinese oracle bones
- Spouse: Annie Belle Sedgwick
- Children: Arthur Menzies

James Mellon Menzies (明義士) (23 February 1885 – 16 March 1957) was a Canadian Presbyterian missionary, archaeologist, professor, and author. He was the first Western scholar to study Shang dynasty Oracle bone script, the earliest form of Chinese writing. In the years following his death, he was considered a leading authority on the Shang dynasty.

== Early life and education ==
Menzies was born in Clinton, Huron County, Ontario, Canada, on 23 February 1885, to David Redpath Menzies and his wife, Jane McGee, a family of Presbyterian farmers. His grandparents, Robert Menzies and Catherine Redpath, emigrated from Chapel Hill, Logie Almond, Perthshire, Scotland in 1832. He attended the University of Toronto and graduated with a degree of civil engineering in 1907. He was a land surveyor before joining the ministry. He attended Knox College in Toronto. He was ordained by the Presbyterian Church of Canada in 1910, and then commissioned to serve in northern Henan Province at the cities of Wu'an and Changde. Instead of taking a standard route along the pacific, he opted to travel through England and Scotland to meet relatives, then continue through Europe and Russia to take the Trans-Siberian Railway into China.

== Travels and career ==
=== Henan 1914–1917 ===
Menzies moved to Anyang, Henan Province in 1914. He used his engineering skills to build wells and homes for locals. Several boys living on the bend of the Huan River found broken pieces of oracle bone, which led Menzies to believe Anyang held the site of the Shang capital, in opposition to scholars like Frank H. Chalfant who suggested Weihui as the site. He started collecting and studying the bone fragments. At the time, antique dealers concealed the origin of their oracle bones to maintain their high price on the market. Menzies successfully identified Anyang as the site of Yin, the last capital of the Shang dynasty. Archaeological expeditions confirmed the Bronze Age city was twenty-four square kilometres and contained relics such as silk weavings, bronze vessels, chariots, and jade, as well as royal palaces and tombs. Luo Zhenyu and Langdon Warner also identified Anyang as the Shang capital in the same year.

=== France ===
As part of the Chinese Labour Corps, Menzies served as Staff Captain of the British Army in France from the years 1917–1920.

=== Beijing ===
In 1927 through 1929, Menzies was unable to resume missionary work in Henan province, and instead taught at the College of Chinese Studies in Beijing.

=== India and the Near East ===
Menzies travelled through India, Mesopotamia, and Palestine in 1929, acquainting himself with archaeology of India and the Near East, including the sites of Tell en-Naṣbeh and Beth Shemesh, and putting to use his land surveyors' training in inspecting archaeological sites. He gave his first lecture on the Shang dynasty in 1929, at the behest of Luther Carrington Goodrich.

=== China 1930–1937 ===
Menzies returned to Changde in 1930 and stayed there until 1932, when he was given a job as professor of archaeology and Sinological research at Cheeloo University in Shandong. During this time, he wrote mostly in Chinese and organized an archaeological museum in the city, based around his own collection. In 1937, Menzies went on furlough, returning to Canada. He was unable to return to China due to the outbreak of the Second Sino-Japanese War.

=== Canada and the United States ===
In Toronto, Menzies served as a research assistant in Chinese archaeology at the University of Toronto. His PhD, obtained in 1942, included a thesis entitled "Shang Ko: a Study of the Characteristic Weapon of the Bronze Age in China in the Period 1311–1039 B.C." From 1942 to 1946, he served in the United States Office of War Information, in San Francisco and Washington. He retired to Toronto following a heart attack.

== Later years and death ==
In 1956, Menzies's former mentor Bishop White published Bronze Culture of Ancient China, which took much of Menzies's work without credit, following several other cases where White had rejected his work but later published under his own name. The People's Republic of China had denounced him and his work at Cheeloo University as cultural imperialism for political purposes. These combined with his wife Annie's deteriorating condition due to cancer and a broken hip to Menzies's stress. He suffered a second heart attack and died on 16 March 1957.

== Personal life ==
Menzies was married to Annie Belle Sedgwick, a church nurse who was sent to Kaifeng, Henan province, China in 1910. They married in the local Church in 23 February 1911. Menzies's son Arthur Menzies, who was born in China, served as a Canadian diplomat, with posts in Australia, Belgium, China, Cuba, Japan, and Malaysia.

== James Menzies' Oracle Bone Collection ==
Menzies published one of the first books on oracle bone script Oracle Bone Inscriptions of Yin Ruins in 1917. In the book, he selected 2,869 pieces from his own collections and hand-copied them to be included in the book. This was the first book on oracle bones written by a foreigner. In 1928, he further selected additional 2,819 pieces to be included.

Menzies collected 30 to 40 thousands pieces of oracle bones, the largest private collection in the world. Most of the bones are currently in collections in four locations: 1) 2,369 in Na Jing Museum; 2) 20,364 in Beijing Palace Museum; 3) 3,668 in Shandong Museum; 4) 5,100 in Canadian Ontario Museums.

== Legacy ==
The Royal Ontario Museum established the James Menzies Chinese Research Fellowship in 2009. There is a museum dedicated to James Menzies in Anyang and conferences about his studies are held across China. An extinct species of water buffalo whose antlers were used in oracle bones was excavated in Anyang and given the scientific name Elaphurus menziesanus in his honour.
