= Wang Yirong =

Chinese official and scholar

- 王懿榮
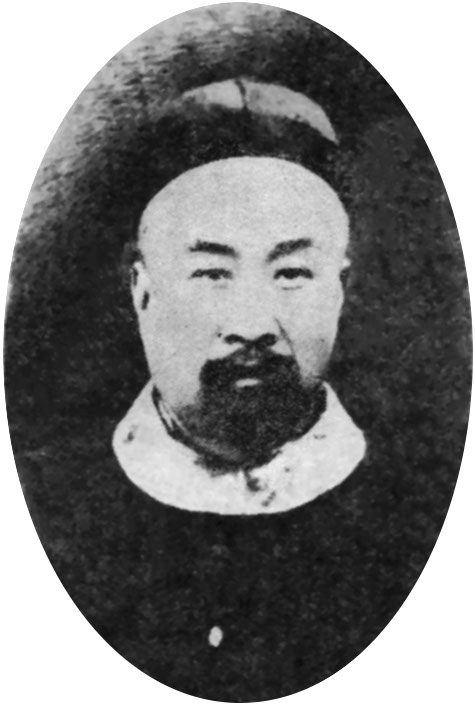
- Born: 1845; Fushan, Deng Prefecture, Qing China (today's Yantai, Shandong, China)
- Died: August 1900 (aged 54–55); Jingshi, Shuntian Prefecture, Zhili, Qing China (today's Beijing, China)
- Cause of death: Suicide
- Occupations: Administrator of education, archaeologist, epigrapher
- Title: Director of the Academy

Academic work
- Discipline: Archaeology, epigraphy
- Sub-discipline: Palaeography, oracle bone script
- Institutions: The Guozijian

Wang Yirong (Chinese: 王懿榮; pinyin: Wáng Yìróng; 1845–1900) was a director of the Chinese Imperial Academy, best known as the first to recognize that the symbols inscribed on oracle bones were an early form of Chinese writing in 1899. His work on the oracle bone script was curtailed when he accepted a local command fighting the Europeans, despite his belief that the cause was futile. When an international force occupied Beijing in August 1900, Wang committed suicide, together with his wife and daughter-in-law. A museum devoted to Wang is located in his birthplace of Yantai, Shandong.
