= Geng Ding =

King of Shang dynasty
- Predecessor: Zu Jia or Lin Xin
- Successor: Wu Yi
- Born: c. 11-12th Century BCE
- Died: 1148 BCE
- Spouse: Bi Xin (妣辛)
- Issue: Wu Yi
- Father: Zu Jia

Kang Ding (康丁) or Geng Ding (庚丁) was a king of the Shang dynasty of China. His given name is Xiao (嚣). He was enthroned in the year of Jiawu (甲午) and his capital was at Yin (殷).

== Reign ==
Different sources suggest different reign lengths for Geng Ding. The Bamboo Annals suggest an 8-year reign. On the other hand, the Song dynasty Zizhi Tongjian Waiji (A supplement to the Zizhi Tongjian) and Tongzhi Encyclopedia suggest a 6-year reign. The Diwang Benji (帝王本紀) quoted in Tongzhi suggests a 11-year reign.

Irrespective of reign dates, several oracle bones featuring inept handwriting have been dated to the reign of Geng Ding and Lin Xin, particularly from the diviner Peng. These typically consist of an individual copying an existing diviner's work (e.g. Those from Nan), having it checked, and repeating. This is among the earliest examples of Chinese education and literary training.

Geng Ding Shang dynasty
Preceded by Lin Xin	King of China c. 1173 BC – c. 1150 BC	Succeeded by Wu Yi
