= Lin Xin =

King of the Shang dynasty of China

Lin Xin 廩辛

Ruler of the Shang Dynasty
- Predecessor: Zu Jia
- Successor: Geng Ding
- Born: c. 11-12th Century BCE
- Died: c. 1100 BCE
Names
- Family name: Zi (子)
Temple name
- Lin Xin (廩辛) or Feng Xin (馮辛)

Lin Xin
- Chinese: 廩辛
- Literal meaning: "Granary VIII"
Transcriptions
Standard Mandarin
- Hanyu Pinyin: lǐn xīn
- Bopomofo: ㄌㄧㄣˇ ㄒㄧㄣ
- Wade–Giles: lin^{3}-hsin^{1}
Yue: Cantonese
- Yale Romanization: lam^{5} sam^{1}
Middle Chinese
- Middle Chinese: limX sin
Old Chinese
- Baxter–Sagart (2014): /*p.rimʔ [s]i[n]/
- Zhengzhang: /*b·rɯmʔ siŋ/

Alternative Chinese name
- Chinese: 馮辛
- Literal meaning: "Surname VIII"
Transcriptions
Standard Mandarin
- Hanyu Pinyin: féng xīn
- Bopomofo: ㄈㄥˊ ㄒㄧㄣ
- Wade–Giles: fêng^{2}-hsin^{1}
Yue: Cantonese
- Yale Romanization: fung^{4} sam^{1}
Middle Chinese
- Middle Chinese: bjuwng sin
Old Chinese
- Baxter–Sagart (2014): /*[Cə.b]əŋ [s]i[n]/
- Zhengzhang: /*bɯŋ siŋ/

Lin Xin (廩辛) was a king of the Shang dynasty of China. He succeeded Zu Jia and was succeeded by Geng Ding. Little is known about him outside of succession records in historical annals, and whether he is mentioned in oracle bone inscriptions is unclear.

== Names ==
The name Lin Xin comes from Sima Qian's Records of the Grand Historian. In the Bamboo Annals, the name Feng Xin appears and succeeds Zu Jia, the same sequence, and they are thus thought to be the same person. This is reflected in Taiping Yulan, which merges the two into the same chapter.

== Reign ==
Lin ascended the throne in the year of Gengyan (庚寅) in the capital of Yin (殷). He ruled for four years. In the Taiping Yulan, Lin Xin is said to have reigned for six years, citing a passage from Records of the Grand Historian, but said passage is not seen in the received text.

Oracle bone evidence suggests Lin Xin's reign promulgated early forms of education for Shang dynasty religious practitioners, with more than several examples of beginner's handwriting appearing on bones dated to his reign, particularly from the diviner Peng.

Lin Xin Shang dynasty
Preceded by Zu Jia	King of China	Succeeded by Kang Ding
