= Zheng (diviner) =

Prominent Shang dynasty diviner

Zheng 爭
- Oracle bone inscription written by Zheng, enquiring about whether disasters will occur over the next 10-day week.
- Born: c. 12th century B.C. Shang dynasty
- Occupation: Shang dynasty diviner
- Known for: Ritual contributions during the reigns of multiple rulers.

Zheng
- 爭 in oracle bone script
- Chinese: 爭
Transcriptions
Standard Mandarin
- Hanyu Pinyin: zhēng
- Bopomofo: ㄓㄥ
- Wade–Giles: chêng^{1}
Wu
- Romanization: ^{1}tsan
Yue: Cantonese
- Yale Romanization: zaang^{1}
Middle Chinese
- Middle Chinese: tsreang
Old Chinese
- Baxter–Sagart (2014): /*[ts]ˤreŋ/
- Zhengzhang: /*ʔsreːŋ/

Zheng (爭) was a prominent diviner during the Shang dynasty, appearing in over 800 oracle bone inscriptions. They (Note: Zheng's gender is not known.) are known to have served Wu Ding and Zu Geng during the Late Shang period.

== Periodization ==
Zheng was a member of the bin 賓 group of diviners along with Nan, marking Period 1 of oracular inscriptions. Chen Mengjia notes that Zheng is among the most prolific of diviners, which has served as a useful metric for dating oracular inscriptions. For example, on one occasion Zheng wrote with members of the Zi diviner group, which shows that their Bin group was contemporaneous with them.

== Role and Life ==
As a practitioner of the state faith of the Shang dynasty, Zheng would divinate on topics of importance to the ruler through a process known as scapulimancy, by burning a turtle plastron until cracks appeared, usually those of Mauremys sinensis. Topics include matters such as war, illness, pregnancy, marriage, toothache, harvest, receiving protection, and much more. The divination process itself involved consulting with Shang ancestors or deities for advice, input, and action on these topics.

甲午卜爭貞翌乙未用羌用之日霧
On the jiawu day, Zheng divinated. Test: On tomorrow's yiwei day, should we use the Qiang people? On that day, there was a fog.

Shang dynasty divinations during Zheng's period typically follow four stages:

1. Preface - Date, the act of recording the divination, and the diviner's name (甲午卜爭 On the Jiawu day, Zheng divinated).
2. Charge - The question posed to the ancestor, beginning with 貞. The shell is then put under a flame until the plastron cracks.
3. Prognostication - Usually performed by the ruler. They analyse the cracks on the shell and conclude whether there is an auspicious sign relating to the writing.
4. Conclusion - An individual marks the shell verifying whether the charge came true or not.

While oracular inscriptions prominently mention Zheng, it is unknown whether they would inscribe on turtle shells themselves, or if a scribe did so for them as the divination was performed. This can be seen through inconsistencies between writing styles on oracle bones with the same diviner. Additionally, the metaphysical orientation that went into the divination process is unclear. It is implied that oracle bone scribes would go to a place called a xue 學, based on two oracle bone inscriptions, (Note: HJ 8304 and HJ 16406) which use the word in a position consistent with nouns rather than the common verb sense "to study." However, this is uncertain due to limited evidence and syntactic ambiguity.
