= Wu Yi of Shang =

Shang dynasty king from 1147 BC to 1112 BC

Wu Yi 武乙
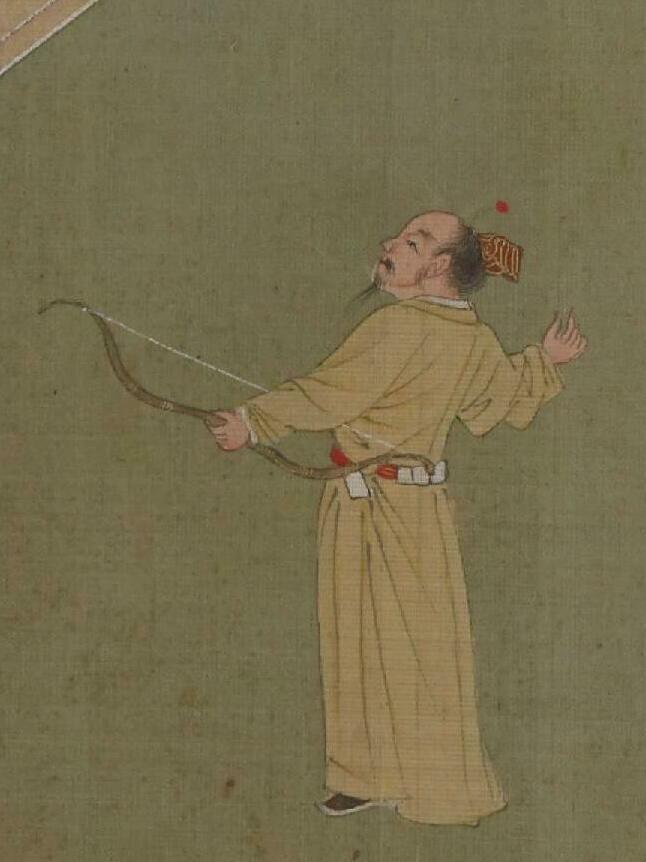
- Reign: 1147–1112 BC
- Predecessor: Geng Ding
- Successor: Wen Ding
- Died: 1112 BC
- Issue: Wen Ding
Full name
- Family name: Zǐ (子); Given name: Qu (瞿)
Temple name
- Wǔ Yǐ (武乙)

Wu Yi (武乙), personal name Zi Qu (子瞿) was king of the Shang dynasty of ancient China from 1147 to 1112 BC. According to the Bamboo Annals, his capital was at Yin. He was a son of his predecessor Geng Ding and father of King Wen Ding.

== Records ==
In the 21st year of his reign, the Zhou leader Koufu (口父) died.

According to the Bamboo Annals, in the 24th year of the regime of Wu Yi, Zhou attacked Cheng (程) at Bi (毕) and defeated Bi.

According to the Bamboo Annals, in the 30th year, Zhou attacked Yiqu (义渠) and captured the king of Yiqu. According to Sima Qian, the King of Yiqu had two sons by different mothers; after the king died, they fought each other for the throne only to have Zhou defeat them both and absorb the territory of Yiqu.

In the 34th year of Wǔ Yǐ's reign, King Ji of Zhou came to the capital to worship and was rewarded with 30 pieces of jade and 10 horses.

In the 35th year of Wǔ Yǐ's reign, Ji attacked the Guirong (鬼戎) at Xiluo (西落). According to Sima Qian, he captured 20 kings of that tribe. In the same year, Wu Yi went hunting between the Yellow and Wei Rivers and was killed by lightning. According to the Book of Documents, this was blamed on Wu Yi's grave impiety. Wu Yi's death is still a mystery; it has been speculated that Wu Yi may have been a reformer who wanted to separate church and state, and priests as a retaliatory action scandalized his image and made a fabricated record that "Wu Yi was struck by lightning when he shot Heaven". Some scholars speculate that Wu Yi died in battle or died of illness between the Wei River and Luoshui.

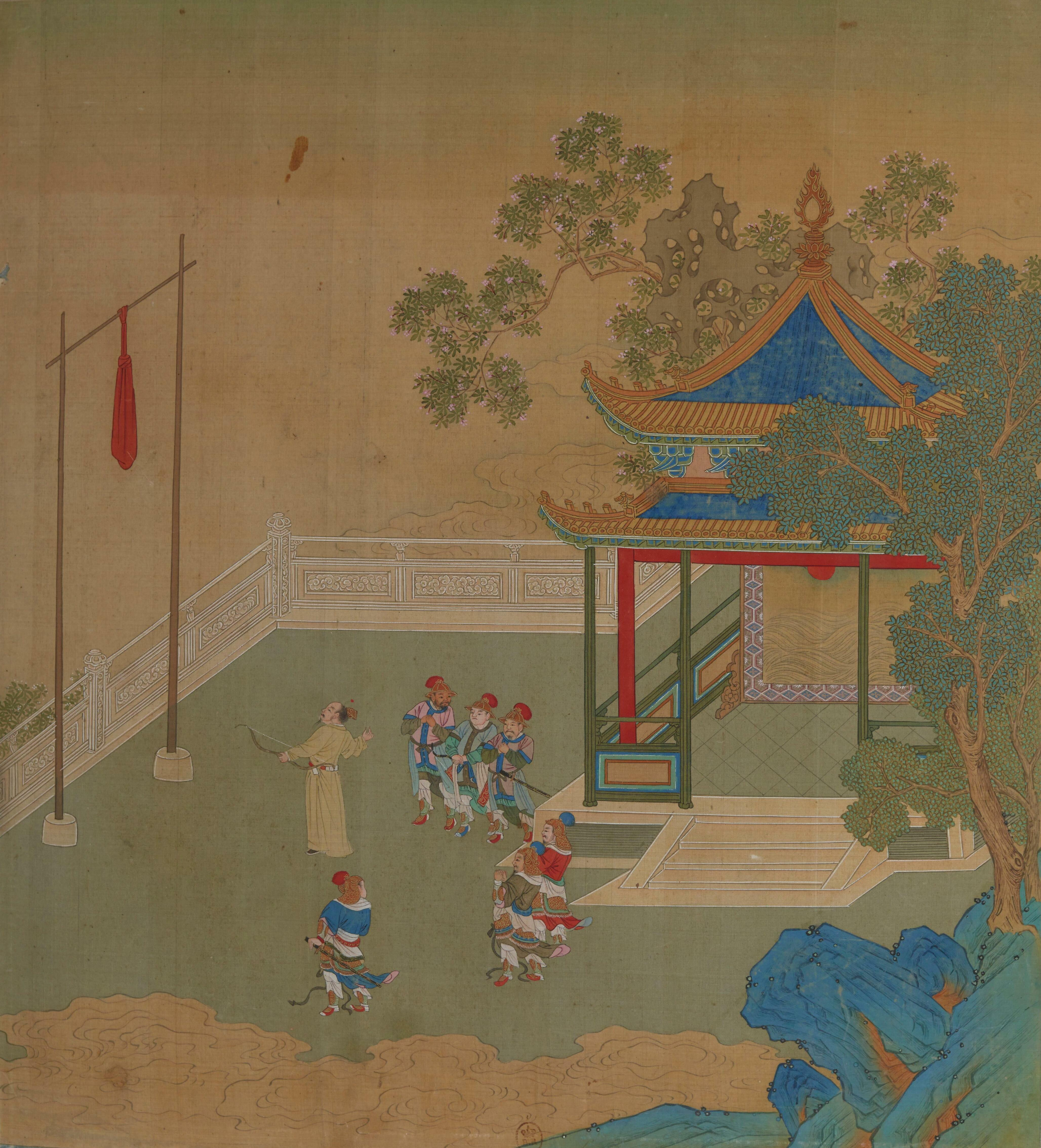
Wu Yi shooting Heaven

According to the Records of the Grand Historian, he was supposed to have carved a wooden statue (偶) of "the God of Heaven" and had one of the people throw dice to represent it. He played liubo with the idol and if the idol lost the game, he humiliated it. Another time, he filled a leather bag with blood and hung it high in the air, then shot it with arrows; he called this "shooting Heaven".

Wu Yi of Shang Shang dynasty
Preceded by Kang Ding	King of China c. 1147 – c. 1112 BC	Succeeded by Wen Wu Ding
