= Gorodetsky (surname) =

Gorodetsky or Gorodetski Городецкий (masculine), Gorodetskaya Городецкая (feminine), or Gorodetskoye Городецкое (neuter) is a Russian surname which indicates someone who hails from the town of Gorodets. It may also correspond to the Polish language surname Horodecki and Lithuanian language surnames Gorodeckis, Gorodeckas, Horodeckis.

Notable people with the surname include:

- Eddie Gorodetsky, American television writer and producer
- Gabriel Gorodetsky (born 1945), Israeli historian
- Olga Gorodetskaya (born 1965), Russian historian of China
- Robert Gorodetsky (born 1940), Russian clown and actor
- Sergey Gorodetsky (1884–1967), Russian poet
- Vladimir Gorodetski (born 1937), Russian scientist
- Vladimir Gorodetsky (born 1948), Russian politician
- Vladislav Gorodetsky (1863-1930), Polish and Ukrainian architect
- Yefim Gorodetsky (1907–1993), Soviet historian
