= Feijiahe culture =

Chinese Bronze Age culture

- Geographical range: East of Dongting Lake
- Period: Bronze Age China
- Dates: c. 1300 – 1000 BC
- Type site: Feijiahe and Zhangshutan
- Major sites: Feijiahe, Zhangshutan, Duimenshan, Tonggushan
- Preceded by: Erligang culture

The Feijiahe culture, also known as Zhangshutan-Feijiahe culture or Duimenshan-Feijiahe, is a Bronze Age archaeological culture in China. It has been commonly dated to approximately 1300 to 1000 BC. Centered in the area east of Dongting Lake, the Feijiahe culture was a post-Erligang culture marked by the increase of localized traditions.

== History ==
Area of the Erligang culture. Panlongcheng was the center of an Erligang culture variant.

The Feijiahe culture has been usually dated as beginning around 1300 BC, (Note: Findings at Tanheli have led some researchers such as Xiang Taochu to suggest a much later date for hybrid cultures in southern China. According to this proposal, sites in Hunan, including Tanheli, were home to refugees of the Shang dynasty after the latter had been overthrown by the Zhou dynasty around 1000 BC. Accordingly, the Shang immigrants and locals formed a mixed culture which consequently persisted during the Western Zhou period. However, this hypothesis has been challenged, with Robin McNeal arguing in 2014 that the "current archaeological data" does not yet support such conclusions.) existing mostly simultaneously with the Late Shang state which was centered at Yinxu. It has been described as an "indigenous culture" of northeastern Hunan.

Even though the Feijiahe culture sites are variable, they have been grouped together by archaeologists as they exist in a geographic cluster and share certain elements. The Feijiahe sites emerged during a period of fragmentation in Hubei and Hunan, east of Dongting Lake. This area had previously been dominated by Panlongcheng, a site associated with the Erligang culture of the Central Plains. However, Panlongcheng's connections to the Central Plains waned from around 1300 BC, allowing smaller, local sites such as those associated with the Feijiahe culture to grow. The Feijiahe culture appears to have profiliated and expanded just as the Erligang culture retreated, with the main Erligang site east of Dongting Lake, Tonggushan, entering its terminal phase or already being abandoned. The Feijiahe culture was possibly also influenced by other cultures such as those in Jiangxi.

The Feijiahe culture was marked by a "flourishing bronze industry" which produced ding cauldrons, nao bells, zun, and possibly you vessels. These bronzes showed significant differences to bronze objects produced in the Central Plains at the time, with animal motifs and forms such as nao and zun being more uncommon further north. In addition, the culture differed in regards to where the objects have been found: Whereas bronzes of the Central Plains were mostly associated with graves, Feijiahe culture objects are often found in pits or on mountaintops. As a result, bronze objects of the region including those of the Feijiahe culture are difficult to date, as they are often found in relative isolation. However, bronze remained a scarce commodity for the culture; in contrast, pottery was produced in much greater numbers and played a much more important role. Large amounts of glazed and unglazed ceramics were unearthed at Feijiahe culture sites; these are distinct from other regional ceramic traditions such as those in Jiangxi. However, the exact usage and roles of many ceramic objects remains unclear.

Overall, the Feijiahe culture seems to have existed in a period when its territory, the Yueyang area, was a hub for interregional exchange and trade. Its ceramics showcased Erligang, Jiangxi, and Sichuan influences. In turn, pottery of the Feijiahe culture was exported to other regions, with Guo Shengbin even suggested that the local products were exported to centers of the Shang dynasty.

== Sites ==
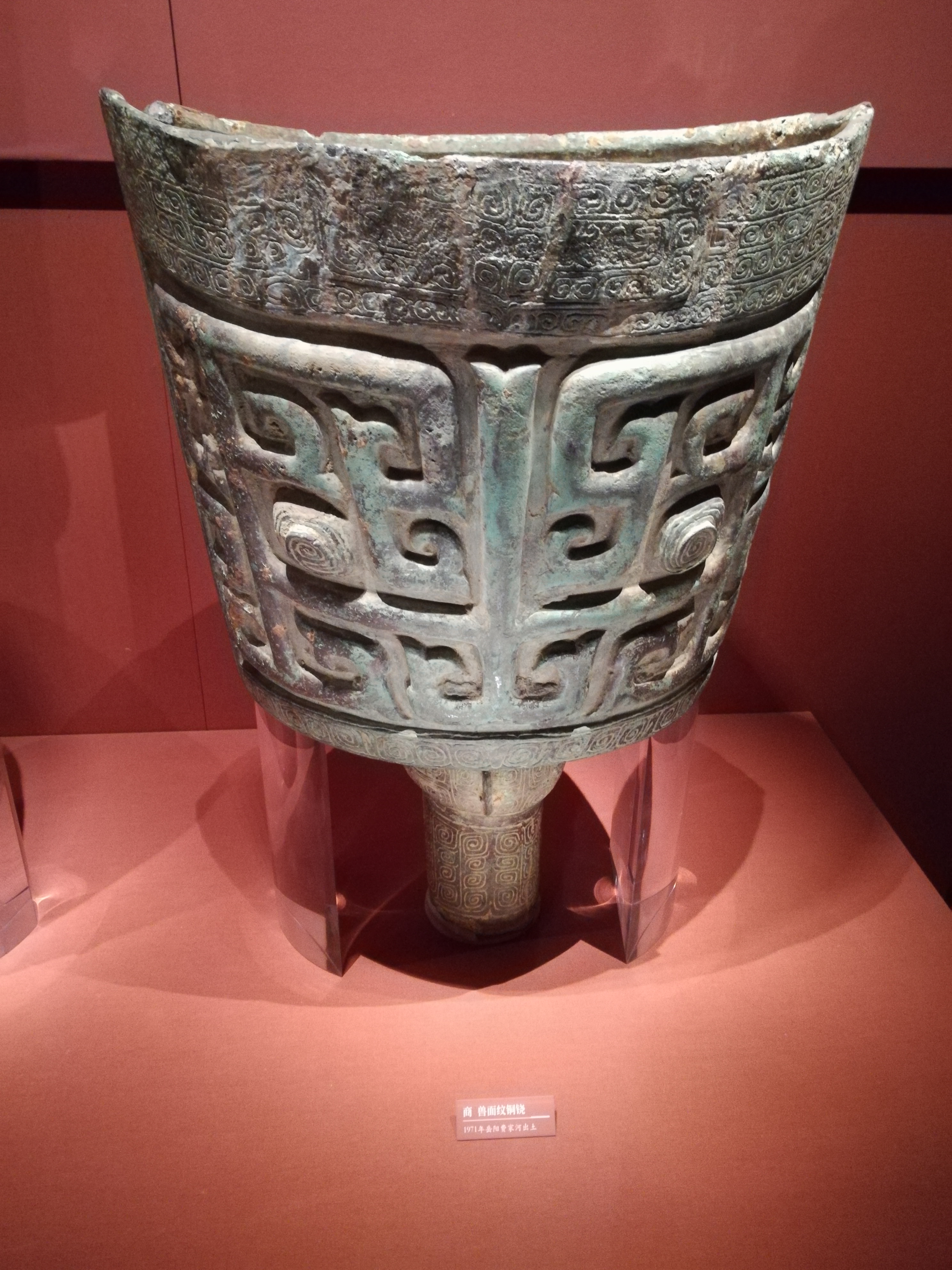
Bronze nao bell with animal motif, unearthed at Feijiahe in 1971.

The Feijiahe culture is associated with the sites of Feijiahe, Tonggushan, Zhangshutan, Duimenshan, Yusishan, Wenjiashan, and Laoyazhou. All of the sites are east of Dongting Lake, and most are close to the Xinqiang River. Yusishan is located at the banks of the Mi-Luo River southeast of Dongting Lake.

Tonggushan is mainly a site of the Erligang culture, known for findings of Erligang-style bronzes and ceramics. It was occupied since at least the Erligang II period, and had probably been founded by non-native settlers from the north, as it shared little in regards to culture with local traditions and was founded on virgin land despite the region being densely inhabited since the Neolithic. Accordingly, archaeologists speculated that Tonggushan might have served as outpost of Panlongcheng or the Erligang culture in general. Over time, local elements became more dominant, and by the middle Shang dynasty (Xiaoshuangqiao-Huanbei II period), the site showed a strong mixture of local and Shang elements. At this point, it was possibly influenced by Wucheng, Baota, Jingnansi. Tonggushan remained occupied into the late Shang dynasty and became largely localized as well as fully integrated into the Feijiahe culture; it was abandoned around the same time of Panlongcheng's final demise, around 1200 BC. Overall, Tonggushan appears to have influenced several nearby sites and led to a continued small-scale bronze production after the regional demise of the Erligang culture.

The Feijiahe site yielded sixty-three kilns, an "astonishing" find, and a massive bronze nao bell. Zhangshutan was occupied since the late Erligang period until the end of the Shang dynasty, approximately from 1300 to 1000 BC. Slag and fragments of molds associated with the production of bronze objects were found at Zhangshutan. However, the site is especially rich in pottery remains, and appears to have been a production center for pottery. As a result, it has become gradually recognized as the main type site of the culture. The site was probably under the influence of Tonggushan. Laoyazhou is also dated to the post-Erligang period; the site yielded crucibles for bronze production. It is associated with Zhangshutan and Yusishan, and was also influenced by Tonggushan. Stone molds for bronze implements were found at Wenjiashan, south of Zhangshutan.

The sites of the Feijiahe culture probably received raw materials from the mining centers of Tonglushan and Tongling located further south.
