= Love at First Sight (1977 film) =

1977 film by Rezo Esadze

- Directed by: Rezo Esadze
- Written by: Bella Abramova (pseudonym for Eduard Topol) (screenplay); Bulat Okudzhava (lyrics)
- Cinematography: Yuri Vorontsov
- Music by: Yakov Bobohidze
- Distributed by: Lenfilm, Gruziafilm
- Release date: 1977
- Running time: 90 minutes
- Country: Soviet Union
- Languages: Russian; Georgian; Azerbaijani

Love at First Sight (Russian: Любовь с первого взгляда, Georgian: ერთი ნახვით შეყვარება) is a 1977 Soviet drama film by Lenfilm and Kartuli Pilmi (Romance/Drama).

== Plot ==
The film narrates the first love of Murad Rasulov, an Azerbaijani ninth-former and a passionate football fan. He's in love with a girl two years older than him. This seemingly insignificant circumstance together with the girl's family tradition became a serious but brief obstacle for newlyweds.

The director's cut of the film released in 1988.

== Cast ==
- Vakhtang Panchulidze as Murad
- Natalya Yurizditskaya as Anya
- Ramaz Chkhikvadze as Murad's father
- Kakhi Kavsadze as Murad's uncle
- Salome Kancheli as Murad's mother
- Vladimir Tatosov as Ashot
- Baadur Tsuladze as gardener
- Vladimir Nosik as Valera
- Robert Gorodetsky as Volodya

== See also ==
- Love at first sight
