= Fanchengdui =

Coordinates: 28.0372°N 115.3281°E

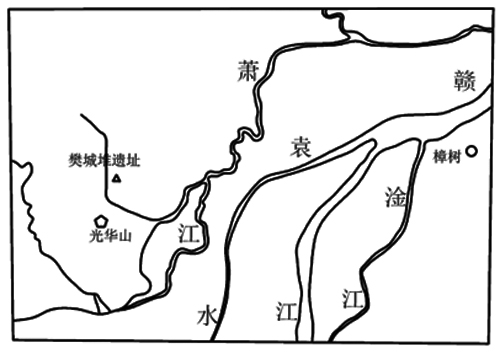
Fanchengdui site map

Fanchengdui (Chinese: 樊城堆) is an archaeological site located in Zhangshu city in the province of Jiangxi, China. It is located upstream on the secondary tributary of the Gan River. The Fanchengdui site is located about 23 km east of another archaeological site, Shinianshan. The river Meng flows through the south part of the Shinianshan site roughly from northwest to southeast, before entering a primary tributary of Gan, Yuanshui. Near Fanchengdui the two rivers and Xiaojiang meet, and together they enter Gan river.

Underneath the site there is a salt mine.

The site was discovered in 1975. Three consecutive excavations were done in 1977, 1978 and 1980. The site is a mound, 1~3 meters in height relative to the surrounding plain, 124 meters in length from north to south, 100 meters from east to west - an area of over 10,000 square meters.[3]

In 2006 it was designated as the sixth protected national cultural heritage site.

== Excavation ==
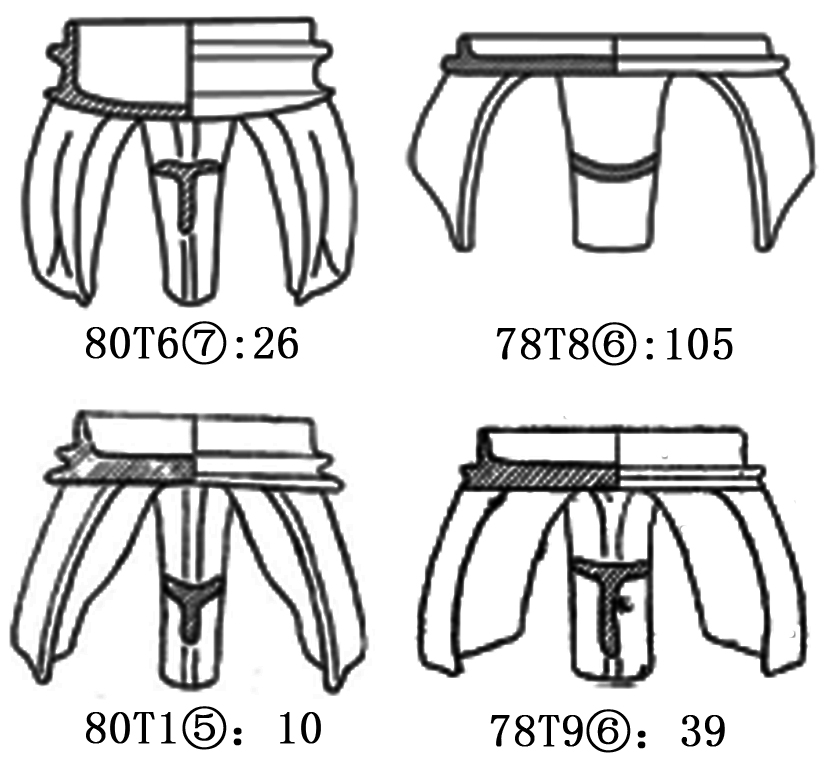
Dings (Tripods) of Fanchengdui Culture, several scholars believe those tools were used in production of salt

Fanchengdui is a typical Bronze Age site of the area, which can be divided into seven cultural layers. The first layer is cultivated land, about 30 cm thick. The second layer belongs to Wucheng culture. The remaining layers from third were recently designated as belonging to Fanchengdui culture. The site is not dated yet, but by comparison with the Shinianshan site, relics in the Fanchengdui site are of the same period as the third cultural level of the Shinianshan site, which would put their age at 4300~3700 years before present. The second layer of Fanchengdui site should then be around 3700~3000 years old.

Among the unearthed relics are pottery kilns, housing construction, pits and tombs. Tomb styles are typical of the Shinianshan and Fanchengdui cultures, but there was also discovered an urn tomb typical of the Shijiahe culture.

Among the unearthed tools there are axes, shovels and other tools of production; also cups, bowls, pots, and other daily appliances. In the fourth and fifth levels, a small amount of hard pottery demonstrates that the site belongs to the Bronze Age. Inside the tombs, clay pottery with black surface predominates. A large amount of sand-tempered ding shaped like shallow plates was unearthed from the site. Several scholars believe those tools were used in production of salt.

== See also ==
- Fanchengdui culture
