= Lixin Guo =

Chinese anthropologist and archaeologist (born 1968)

Dr. Lixin Guo
- 郭立新
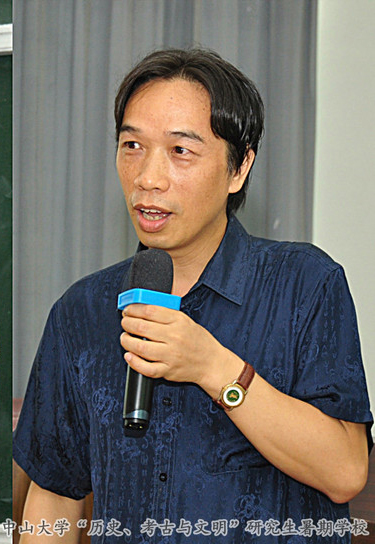
- Lixing Guo giving a lecture
- Born: Lixin Guo; January 28, 1968 (age 58); Hunan, China
- Occupation: Academic
- Known for: Research of Chinese ethnic minorities, excavations of several important archaeological sites in China
- Title: Professor
- Spouse: Olga Gorodetskaya

Academic background
- Education: Nanjing University, Department of Archaeology
- Thesis: 'Initial Social Complexity in the Middle Reaches of the Yangtze River(4300B.C.~2000B.C.)' (2002)

Academic work
- Discipline: Anthropology, archaeology
- Institutions: Sun Yat-sen University

Lixin Guo is a Chinese anthropologist and archaeologist, as well as professor at the Sun Yat-sen University in Guangzhou. He has also given lectures at the Department of History, National Chung-cheng University in Chiayi, Taiwan.

Lixin Guo research the Panlongcheng archaeological site together with another professor of Ancient Chinese history, Olga Gorodetskaya, and can be considered an expert on Erligang and Erlitou cultures. He has also researched and written books on Shijiahe culture and other cultures of the middle Yangtze river.

== Awards and Fellowships ==
Lixin Guo has received several awards for their work in social scientific research and archaeology. In 2000, they were awarded the Third Prize of the Guangxi Outstanding Social Scientific Research Achievement Award. In 2004, they received the Outstanding Thesis Award from Nanjing University. Their contributions to field archaeology were recognized in 2006 with the Third Prize from the State Administration of Cultural Heritage. In 2009, they were honored with the National Field Archaeology Card. Additionally, in 2011, they received the Second Prize of the Guangdong Outstanding Social Scientific Research Achievement Award.

== Publications ==
=== Books ===
- 1998. Anthropological Archaeology, ed. Nanning: Guangxi Nationalities Press.
- 2005. Initial Social Complexity in the Middle Reaches of the Yangtze River(4300B.C.~2000B.C.), Shanghai Guji Press.
- 2006. This World in Heavens: Examination Notes on Zhnuang's Culture in Dragon Ridge, Longsheng, Guangxi. Nanning: Guangxi People Press.
- 2010. The Interaction and Culture Change of the Ancient Nations in the Gorges Region, Beijing: Science Press.

=== Translations ===
2005.Location of Anthropology, Beijing: Huaxia Press.

2006.Burra Charter, in Changjiang Wen Hua Luncong, the Fourth Collection.

2009.Ethnoarchaeology in Action, Yuelu Press.

=== Articles ===
1996. Exploitation of the Folk-custom Resources in Guangxi, Journal of Guangxi University for Nationalities (Philosophy and Social science Edition) No.2.

1997e.Awakening again, Human Beings, Ethnic Arts.No.2

1997d.The Subsistence Economic of Shijiahe Culture, ZGWWB, Jan.12,

1997c.Studies on the Three Area-types of Lengshuichong-type Bronze Drums, Supplement of Journal of Guangxi University for Nationalities (Philosophy and Social science Edition).

1997b.Three Aspects on Ethnoarchaeology, Relics From South 4.

1997a.Relations among Lengshuichong-type, Beiliu-type and Linshan-type Bronze Drums, Journal of Guangxi University for Nationalities (Philosophy and Social science Edition,)No.3.

1998d.On the Stages of Jades of the East Zhou Dynasty, Cultural Relics of Central China, No. 3

1998c.The Lacquer ware Craft in Ancient China, Journal of Guangxi University for Nationalities (Natural Science Edition.)N0. 3

1998b.About the Relations of Archaeology, Anthropology and History ZGWWB, Jan.21.

1998a.Research on Bronze “FU” in Ancient Yelang-state by Lead Isotopes (Second writer) Journal of Guangxi University for Nationalities (Natural Science Edition) 2

2000c.House Remains of Shijiahe Culture, ZGWWB May 3.

2000b.The spatial distribution of Shijiahe Culture. Relics From South, No.1.

2000a.Effects of Archaeological Objectives on Archaeological study: a retrospect of archaeology. HUAXIA ARCHAEOLOGY, No.2.

2001.Tombs of Shijiahe Culture, Jiangsu Literature and History Study, No. 1.

2002.Some Reflects on the study of Chinese civilization origin, ZGWWB Nov.1.

2003.On the Prehistoric Experian Craft Production in the East Area of Hanjiang River. Southeast Culture, No. 9.pp. 22–28.

2004c.Debates on the Cultural lineage of Late Period of Neolithic Era in the Middle Reaches of Yangtze River. JIANGHAN KAOGU. No.3.pp. 69–74.

2004b.Settlement mode and Social Structure of Qujialing Culture. Zhongyuan Relics.No.6.pp. 9–14.

2004a.On the Environmental Change of the Neolithic age in the Middle Research of the Yangtze River, Collections of Essays on Chinese History Geography, Vol.19, No.2, Jun.pp. 5–16.

2005b.Research of Vat-coffin Burying at Late Shijiahe Culture Period, Sichuan Cultural Relics, No.3.2004.To Create Life: Longji Zhuang people's Activity of erecting house, Guangxi Ethnic Studies, N0.1.

2005a.An Analysis of Zhuang Nationality's Funeral Services in Longbei, Journal of South-central University for Nationalities: Humanities & Social Sciences, N0.1.

2006c.On the Public Archaeology. Southeast Culture, No.4.

2006b. On Late Neolithic Livelihood(Subsistence) Economy and Population Pressure in the Middle Yangtze River Valley, Huaxia Archaeology, No.3.

2006a. Mortuary Contextual Analysis and Signals of Status: A Case Study on Hengling Mount (Henglingshan) Cemetery of Shang and Zhou Dynasties in Bolo County. Journal of Sun Yatsen University(Social Science Edition), Vol.46.No.5

2008. “Ethnoarchaeology” Recognition under Different Context, Southeast Culture, No.6.

2009c. Struggle Between the Life Realities and Identity to the Mainstream Society: A Study on the Logics of the House in Longji Zhuang people, Guangxi. Journal of History and Anthropology, Vol. 6, No. 1&2(October 2008):173-218.

2009b. Interpretations of the Dengjiawan Site, Jianghan Archaeology, No.3.

2009a. Labor Cooperation, Ritual Exchange, and Social Grouping: An Analysis of the Village Community Structure of the Zhuang Nationality in Longji, Society, Vol.29, No.6.

2011. GUANGZHOU LAO CHENG QU LISI WENWU ZIYUAN DIAOCHA JI KAIFA CELUE FENXI, WENHUAYICHA, No.4.
