= Fanchengdui culture =

Archaeological culture in China

Fanchengdui culture (Chinese: 樊城堆文化) is an archaeological culture discovered in 1970, in the town of Zhuwei, Qingjiang county, Jiangxi province, China, in archaeological sites such as Fanchengdui. It is a distinctive type of Chalcolithic to Bronze Age culture.

Similar artifacts were discovered within the third period of the Shinianshan site (3A level), Fanchengdui site (7-3 levels) near the Qingjiang river (Zhangshu town), first period of the Zhuweicheng site (3 level), Gongmenshan site, Yinjiaping site in Yongfeng, and elsewhere.

Because the discovery at the Fanchengdui site proved to be more abundant and representative of the culture, it gave its name to what is now known as the Fanchengdui culture.
