= Dayangzhou site =

- 大洋洲程家遗址 (Chinese)
- Xingan site, Chengjia site
- Location within China
- 27.91°N 115.456°E
- Cultures: Wucheng
- Location: China
- Region: Jiangxi

The Dayangzhou Chengjia site (Chinese: 大洋洲程家遗址) is an archaeological site located on the Gan River in Dayangzhou Town, Xingan County, Jiangxi, China. The site was excavated in 1989, and it dates to around 1200 BCE. The rich offerings of bronze and jade objects made it the second richest burial site known after the Fu Hao's tomb.

Dayangzhou was home to a rectangular tomb covered by a tumulus. Largely damaged by the sand shifts, it did not preserve the skeletal remains of coffin, making some archaeologists doubt that the find was a tomb at all.

Over 1,000 jade artefacts were discovered at Dayangzhou.

Dayangzhou is known for its unique style of bronze vessels, with 54 being discovered; over 480 bronze objects were uncovered at the site. The bronze casters at Dayangzhou copied and mastered the techniques of the Erligang culture, then localized the bronze vessels in a distinct style. Dayangzhou is associated with the Wucheng culture.

The artefacts from Dayangzhou are housed primarily in the Jiangxi Provincial Museum.

== Gallery ==
Artifacts excavated from Dayangzhou in the Jiangxi Provincial Museum
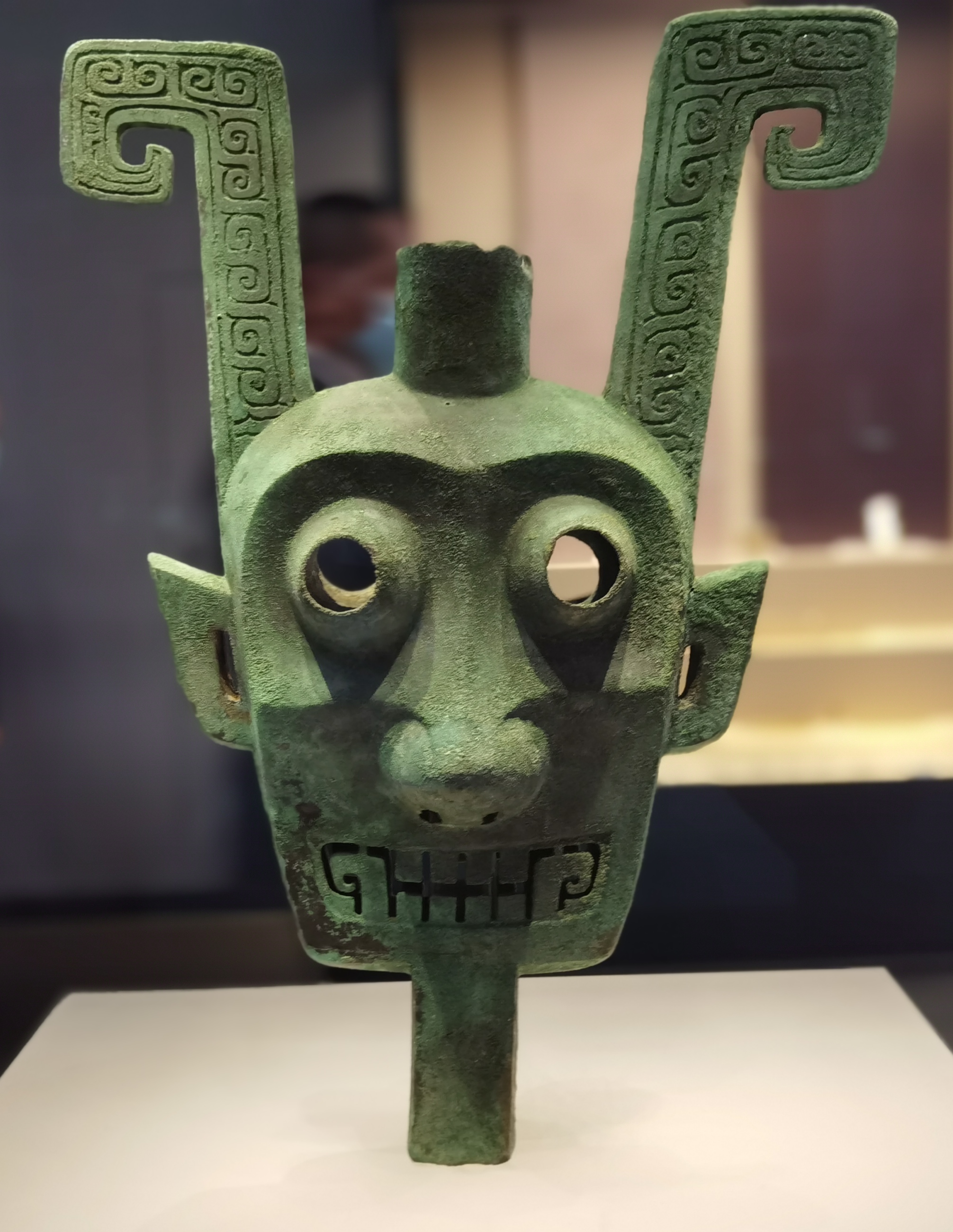
Two-faced bronze mask

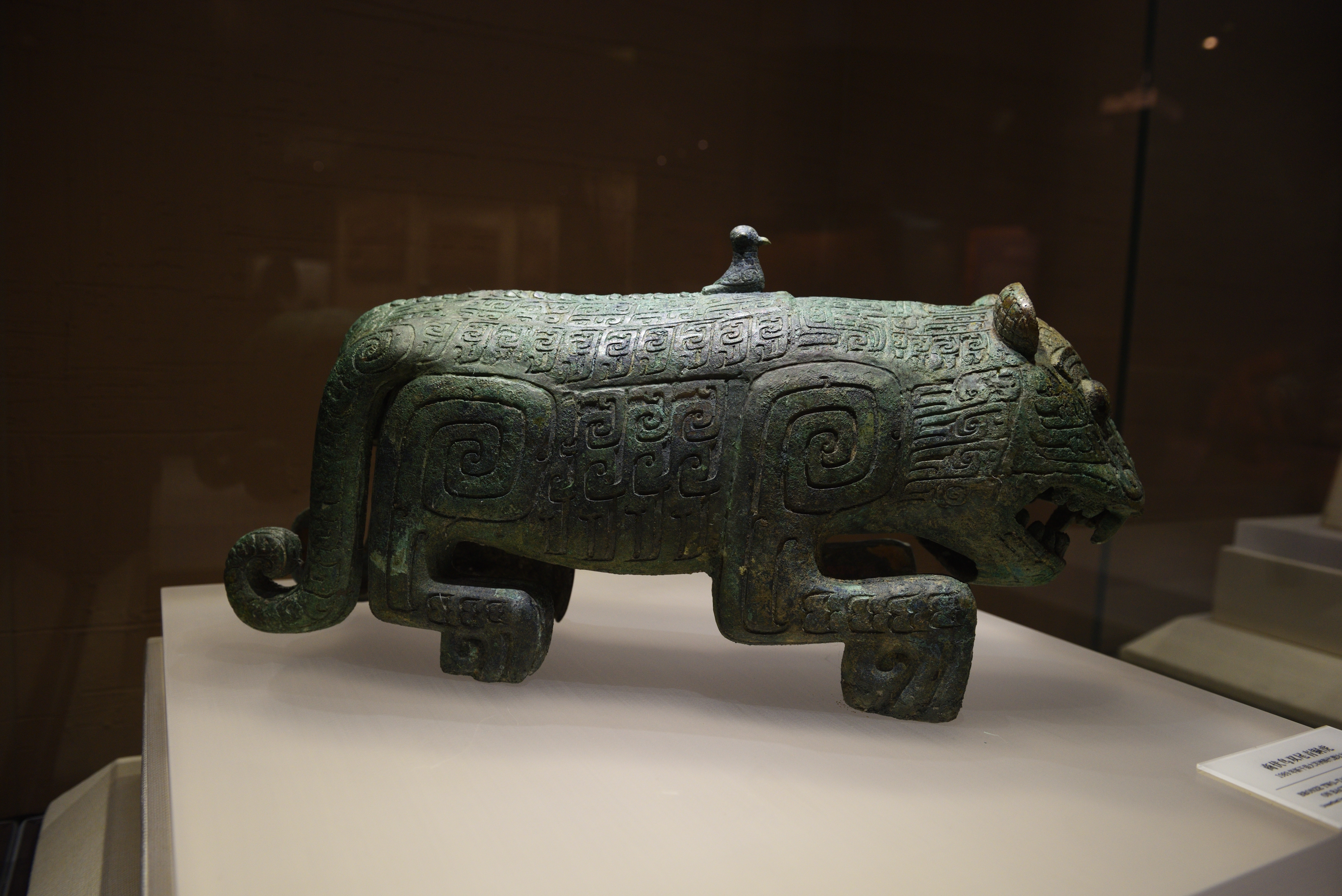
Bronze tiger with bird

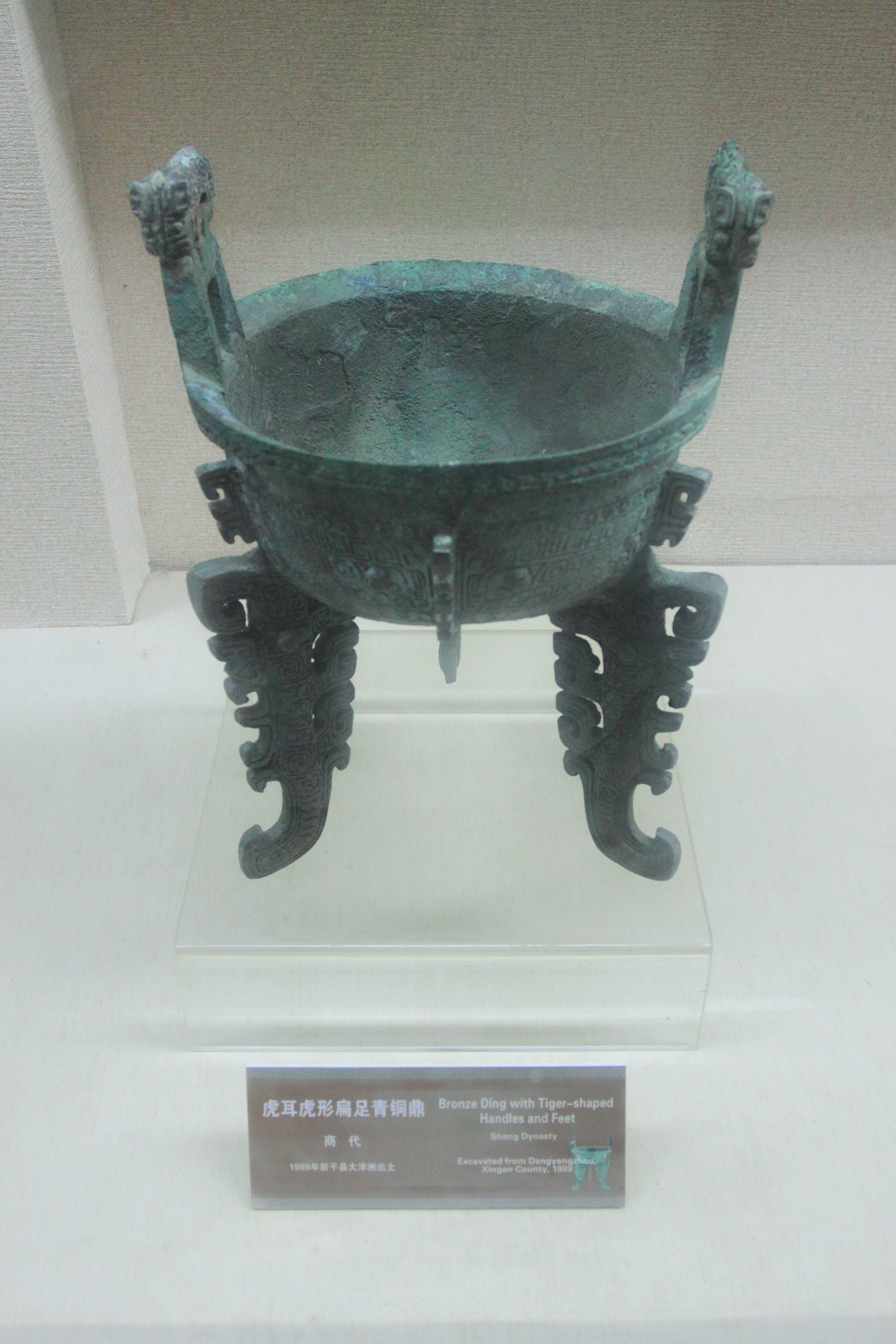
Bronze ding with tiger-shaped handles and feet

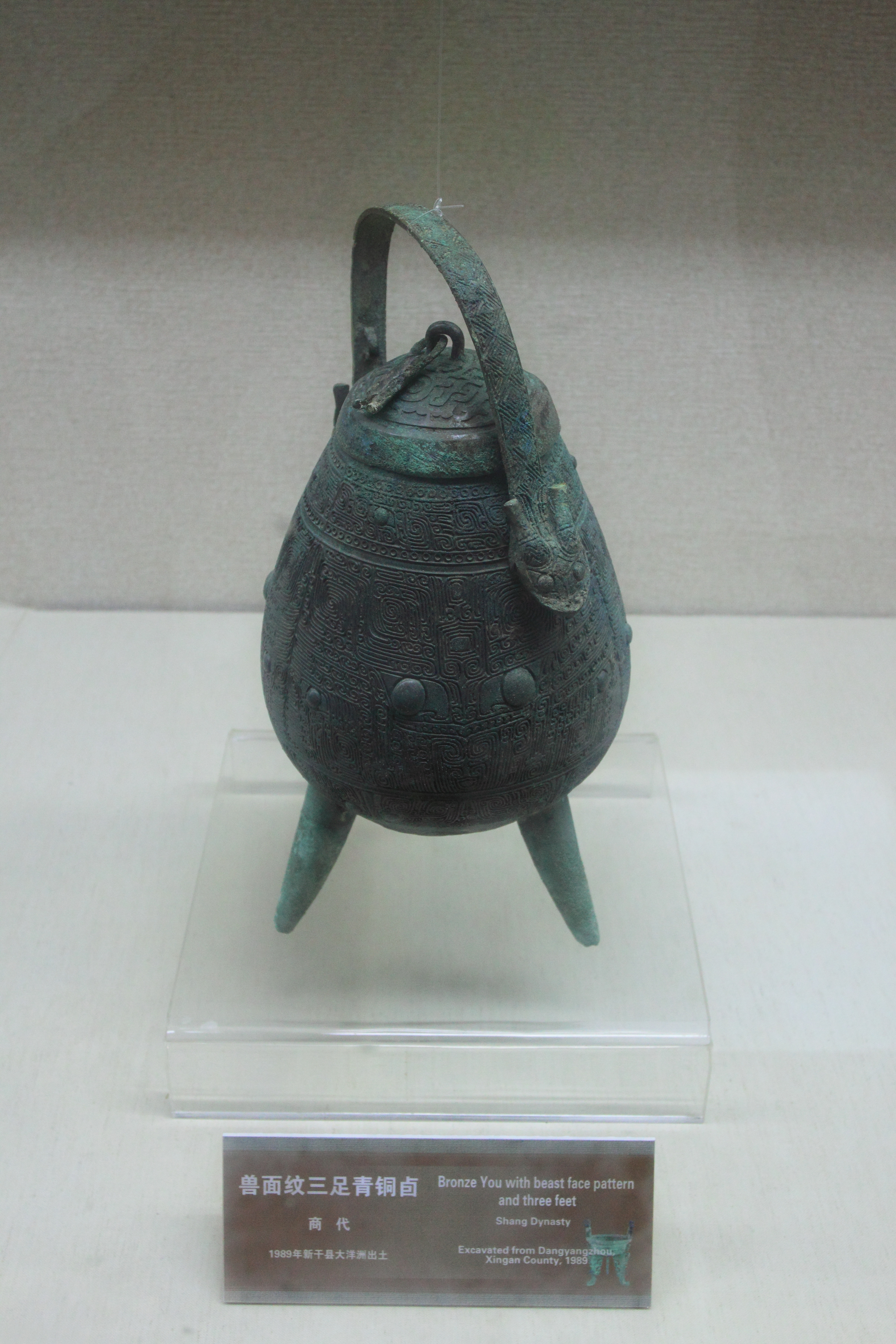
Bronze you tripod with zoomorphic image

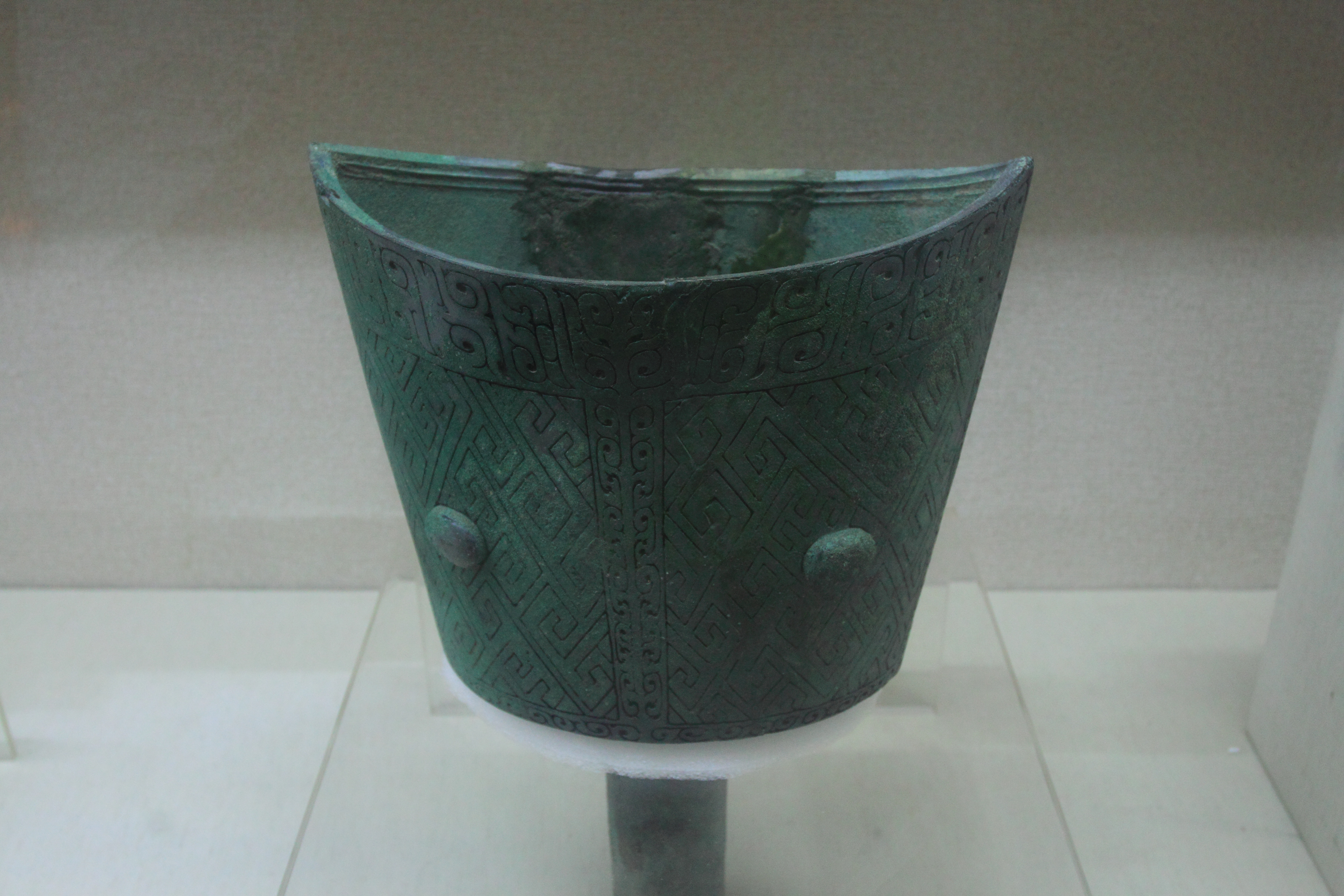
Bronze nao bell

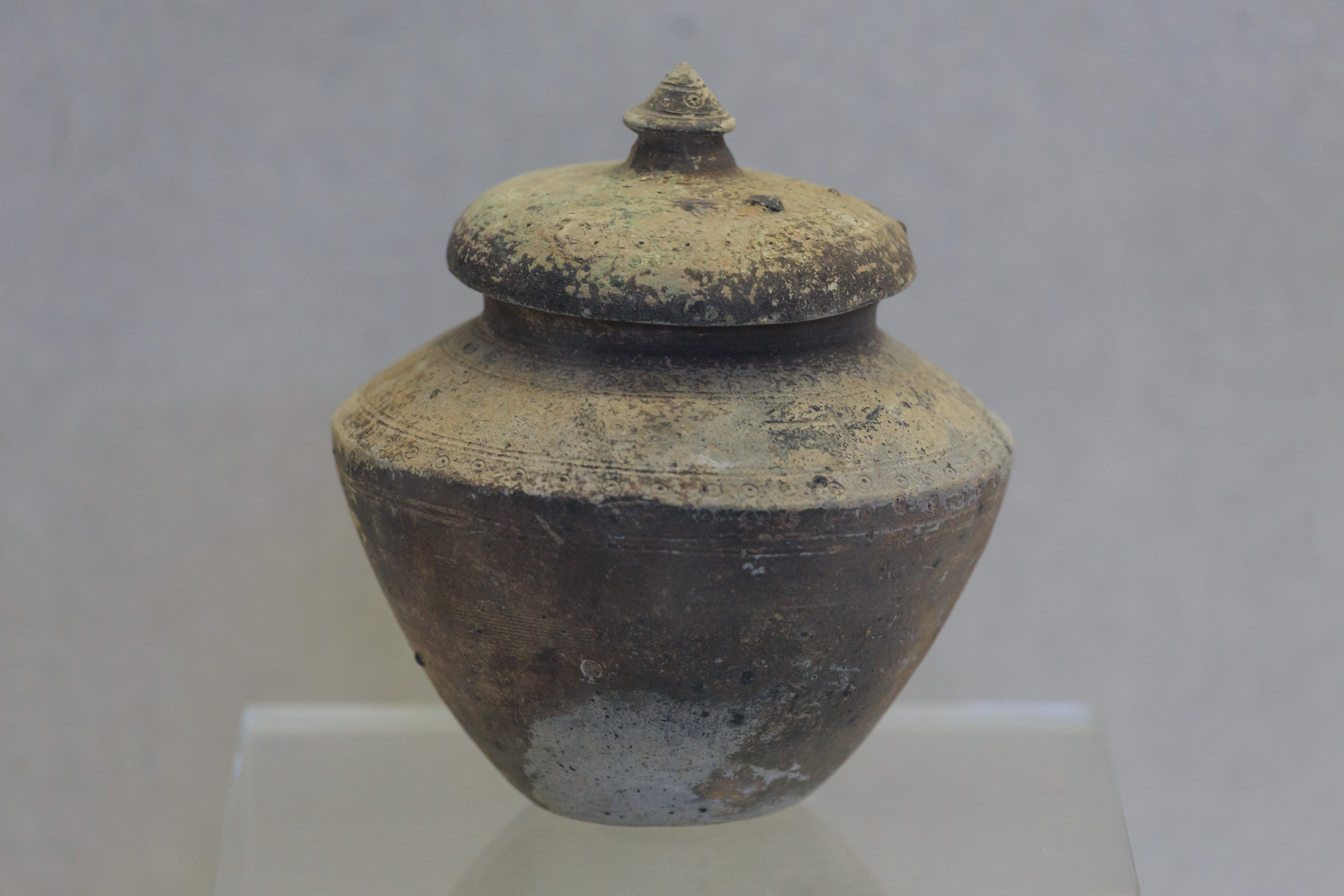
Proto-porcelain pot

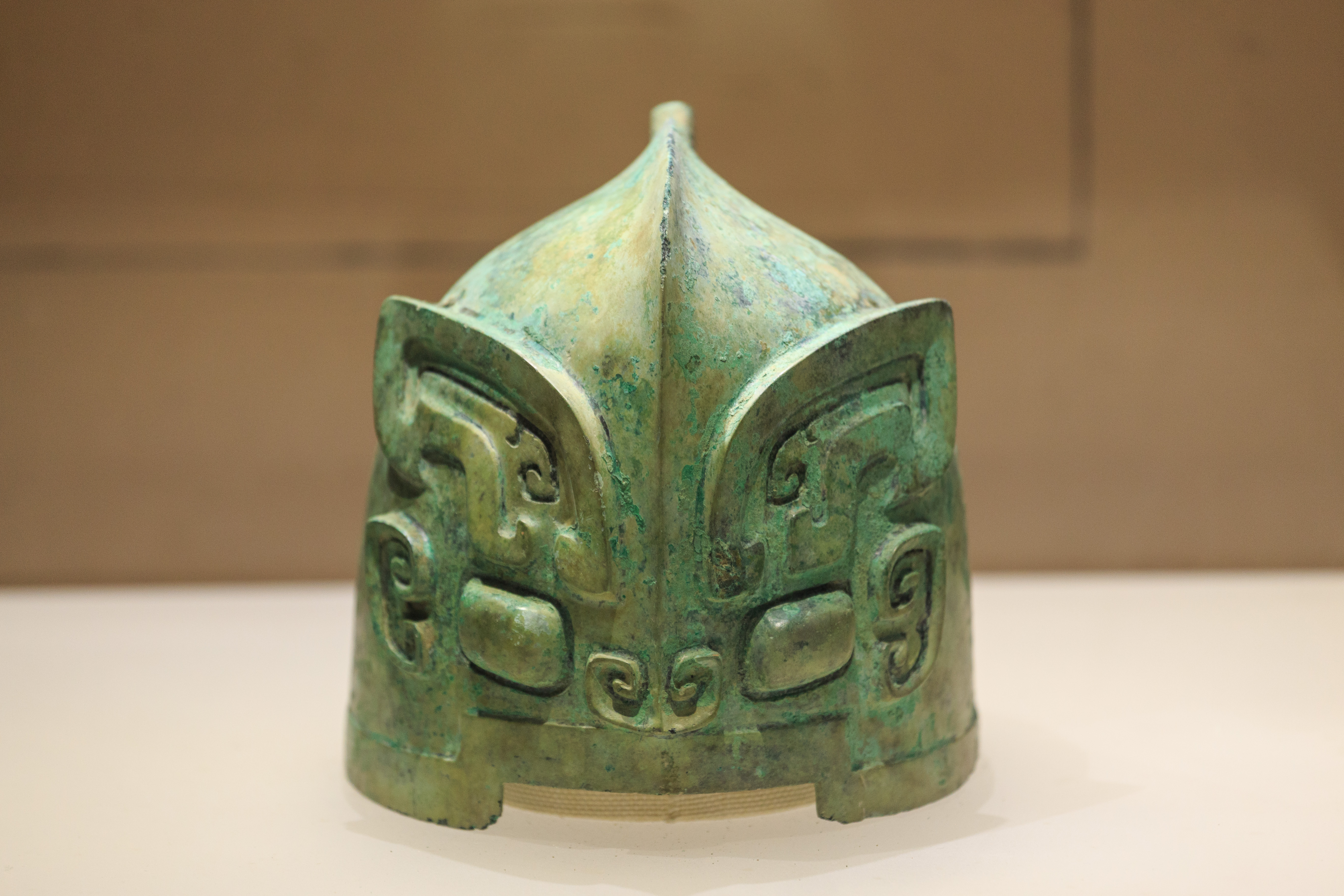
Bronze helmet

== See also ==
- Panlongcheng
- Sanxingdui
