= Baadur =

Baadur (Georgian: ბაადურ) is a given name. Notable people with the name include:

- Baadur Jobava (born 1983), Georgian chess grandmaster
- Baadur Tsuladze (1935–2018), Georgian actor, film director, writer, and broadcaster
