= Wucheng Township, Jiangxi =

Wucheng Township 吴城乡
- Township
- Location in China
- Coordinates: 27°59′05″N 115°17′20″E
- Country: People's Republic of China
- Province: Jiangxi
- Prefecture-level city: Yichun
- County: Zhangshu
- Time zone: UTC+8 (China Standard)

Wucheng Township (simplified Chinese: 吴城乡; traditional Chinese: 吳城鄉; pinyin: Wúchéng Xiāng) is a township under the administration of Zhangshu, Jiangxi, China, where the Xiushui River enters Lake Poyang. As of 2018, it has one residential community, 15 villages, and one experimental forest-area neighborhood under its administration.

== See also ==
- Wucheng culture
