= Da He ding =

Shang dynasty bronze vessel

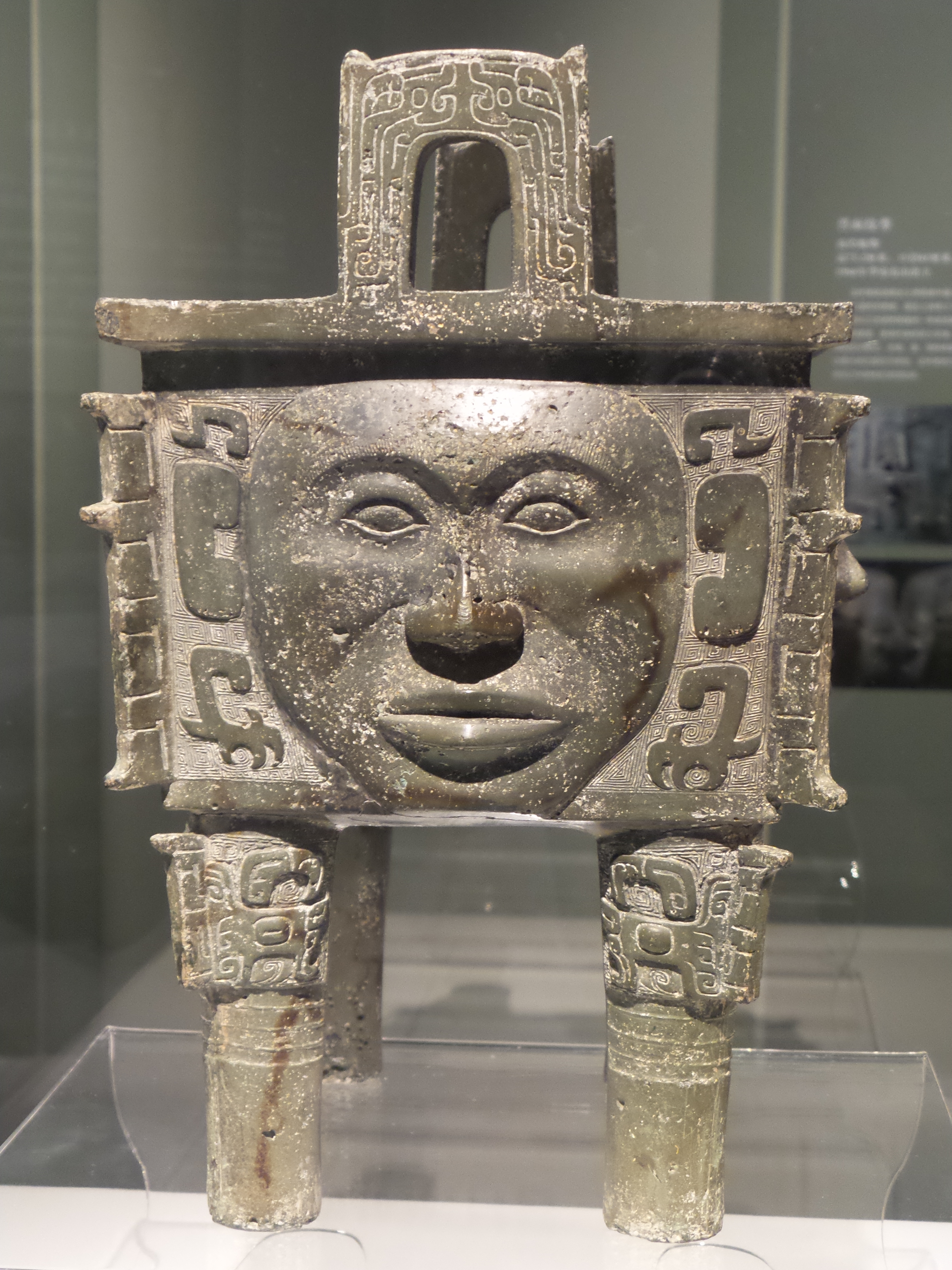
- Material: Bronze
- Height: 38.5 cm
- Created: c. 1300 BC
- Discovered: 1959; Hunan, China
- Present location: Changsha, Hunan, China

The Da He ding or Da He fangding (Chinese: 大禾方鼎; pinyin: Dà Hé fāngdǐng) is an ancient Chinese bronze rectangular ding vessel from the late Shang dynasty (c. 1600–1046 BC). Unearthed in Tanheli, Ningxiang, Hunan in 1959, it is on display in the Hunan Museum. Uniquely decorated with a high-relief human face on each of its four sides, it is the only known ancient Chinese bronze cauldron to use human faces as decoration.

== Description ==
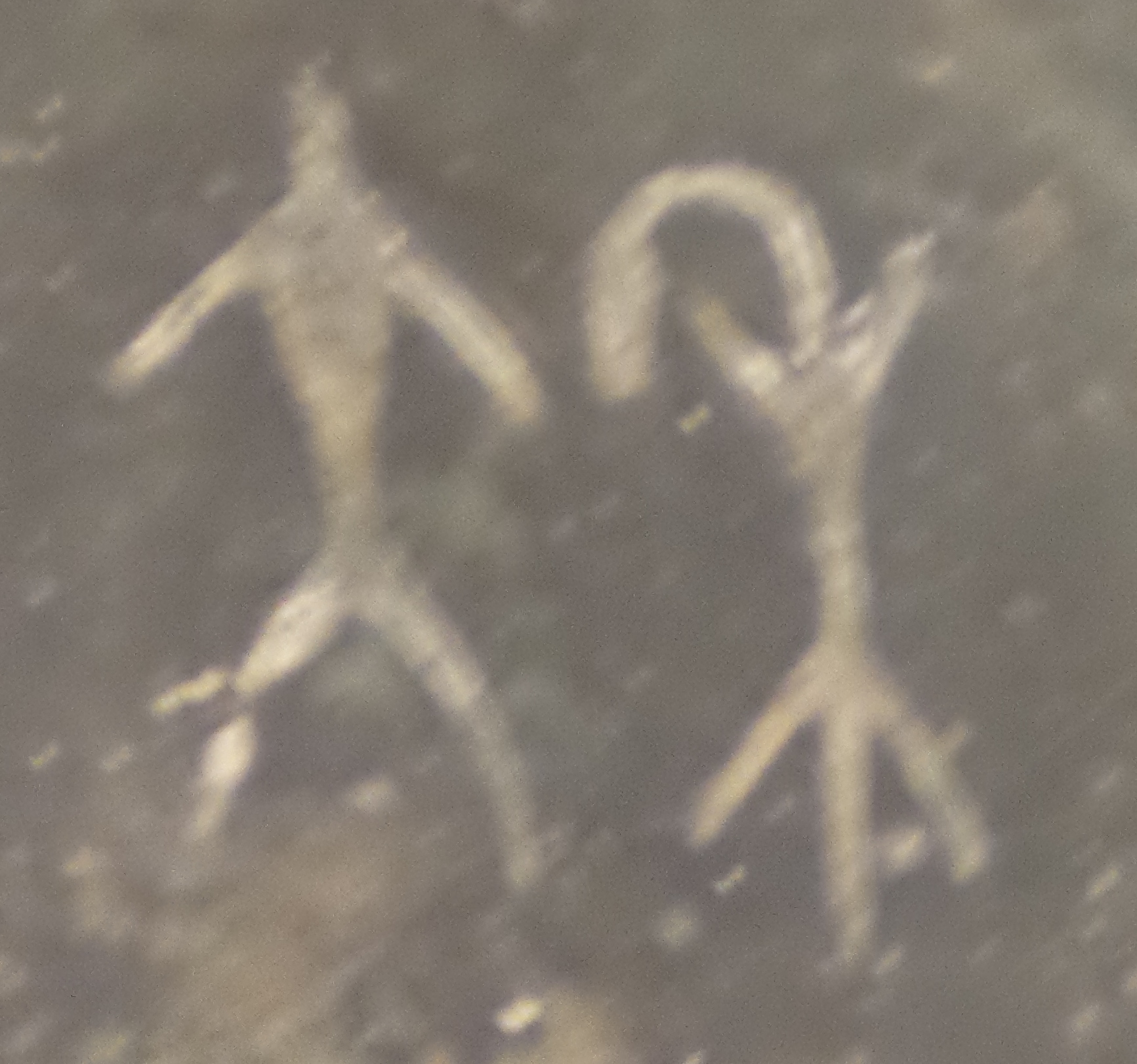
Bronze inscription inside the vessel: Da He (大禾)

The Da He ding is named for the inscription in bronzeware script on its interior wall, which reads "Da He" (Chinese: 大禾), or "Great Grain". Judging by the inscription, it may have been used during sacrifices for harvest. The 11th publication of the Tsinghua bamboo slips research team revealed a text which clarifies "Da He" to be the name of one of four direction gods.

Although the Da He ding was discovered in the southern Yangtze region, its inscription closely resembles those found in the core Zhongyuan region of the Shang dynasty.

The ding is rectangular, with four legs, a common shape during the late Shang. It is 38.5 centimetres (15.2 in) high, and its opening measures 29.8 centimetres (11.7 in) by 23.7 centimetres (9.3 in), which is slightly larger than its bottom.

The most unique feature of the vessel is that each of its four sides are decorated with a dominant human face in high-relief, which is not found in any other ancient Chinese bronzeware. Around the faces are small symbolic decorations of horns and claws, indicating a half-human, half-animal nature of the figures. There are many speculations regarding the identity of the figures, including ancient mythological figures such as Taotie, Zhurong, Chiyou, and the four-faced Yellow Emperor. They may also represent Nuo masks or local ancestral deities.

== Discovery ==
The Da He ding was unearthed in 1959 at Tanheli (now an archaeological park) in Huangcai Town, Ningxiang County, Hunan Province. A peasant digging in his field accidentally discovered the vessel and sold it as scrap metal. This was during the Great Leap Forward, when backyard furnaces were numerous in China. It was sorted and sent to a scrap copper warehouse in Changsha, the capital of Hunan. An employee from the Hunan Museum who was posted at the warehouse to rescue cultural relics, spotted a broken piece from the vessel. He searched the warehouse for the remaining parts, eventually locating more than ten pieces, only missing one leg and the bottom. The pieces were reassembled by Zhang Xinru (张欣如), a bronze repair expert at the Hunan Museum. The missing leg was also found two years later and put back on the vessel.

== Gallery ==
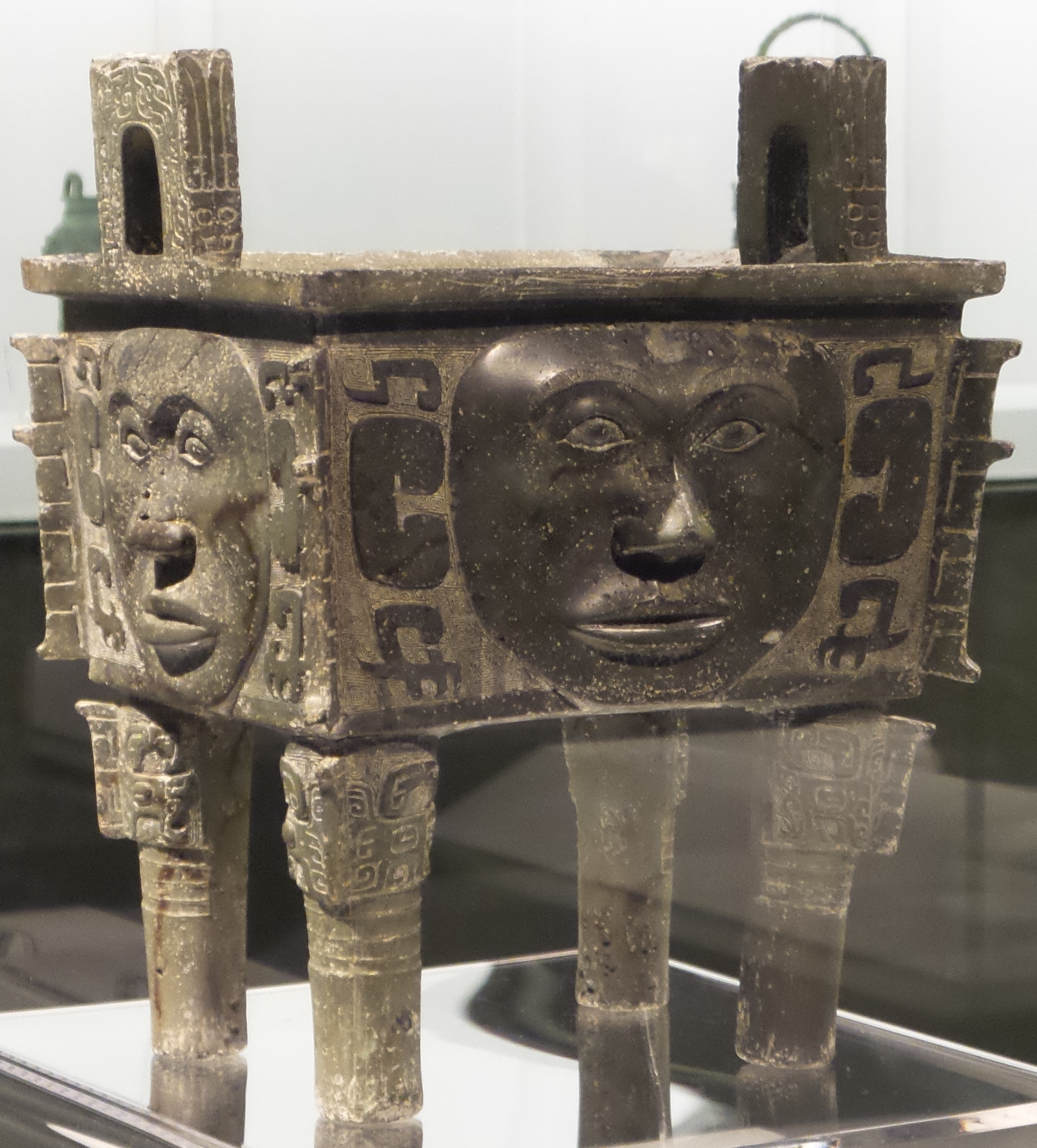
Da He ding

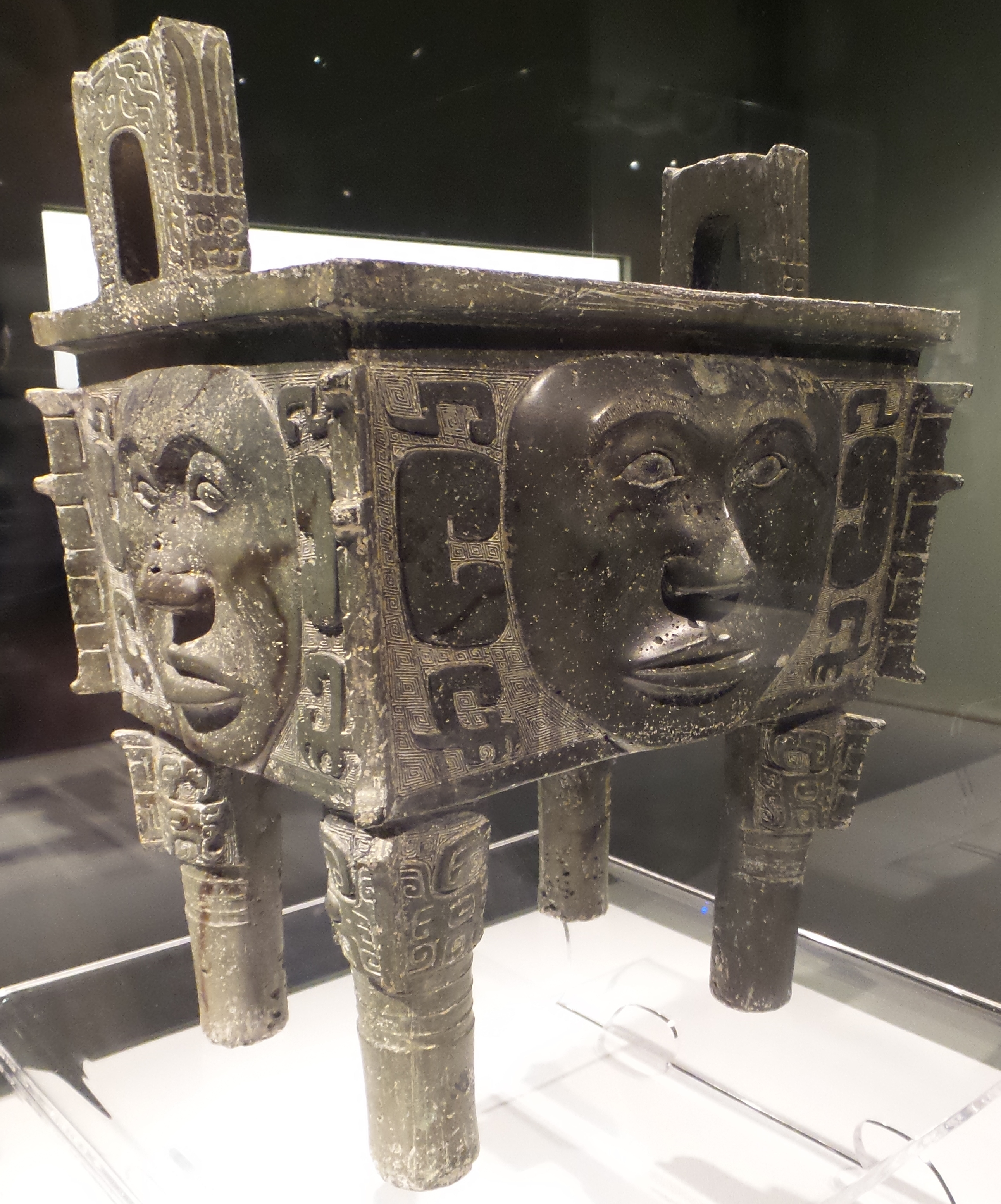
From another angle

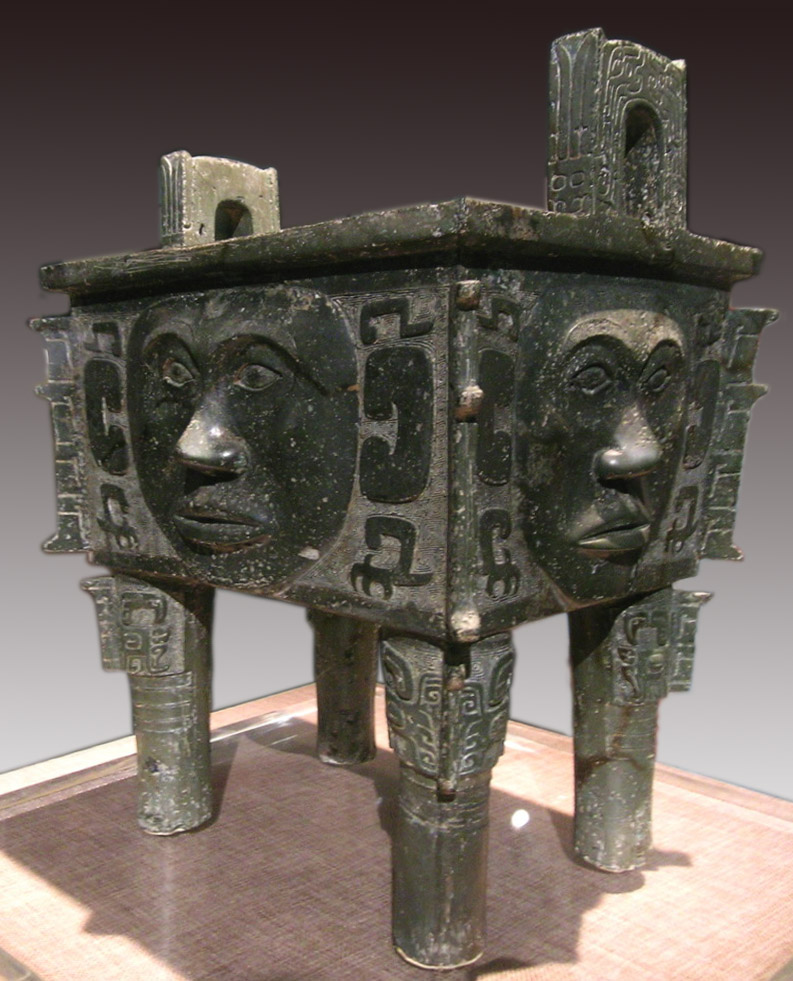
Da He ding

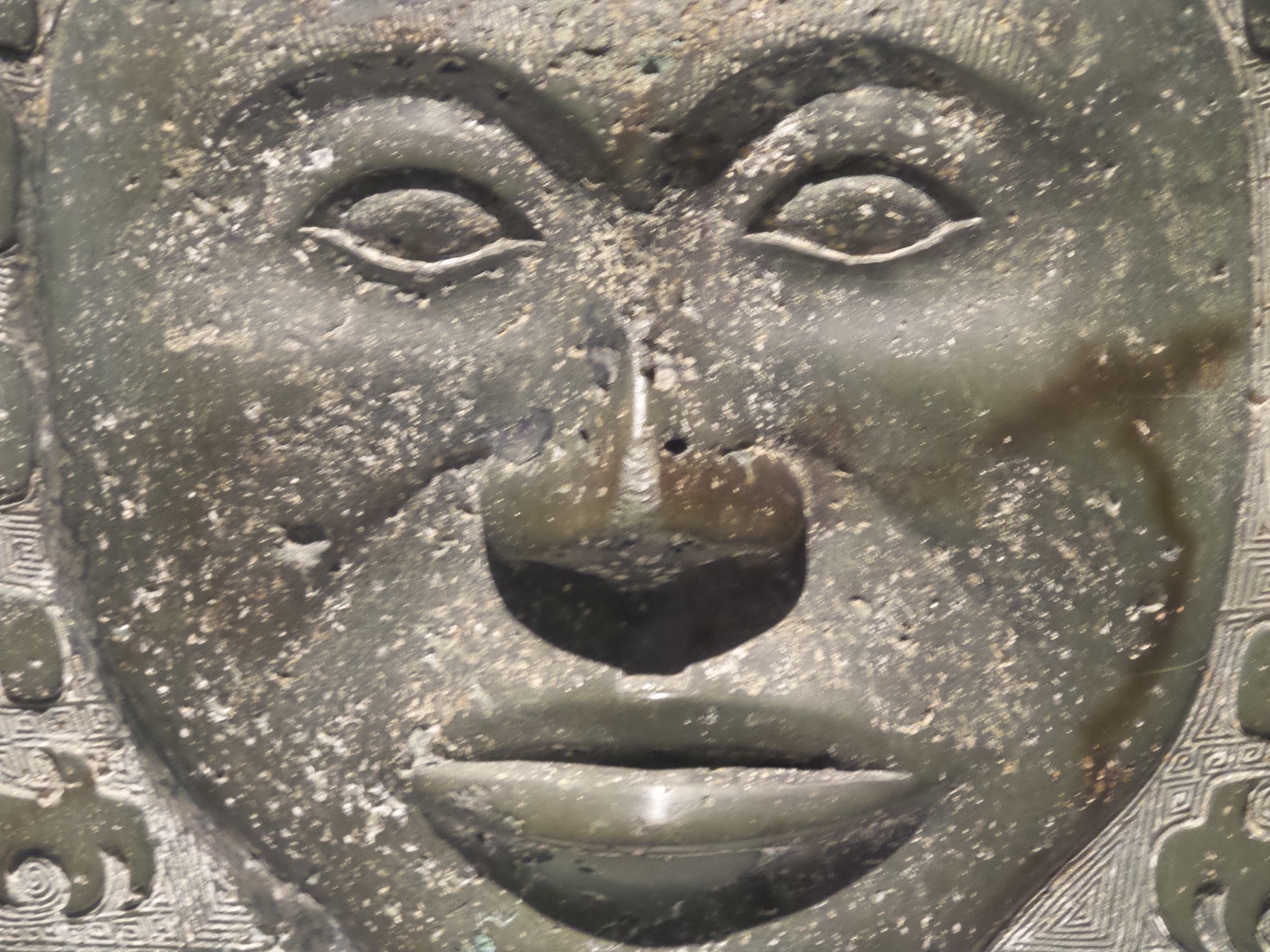
Closeup view of the human face
