= Xia, Shang, Zhou Dynasties =

2013 book by Olga Gorodetskaya

Xia, Shang, Zhou Dynasties: From Myths to Historical Facts
- First edition cover
- Author: Olga Gorodetskaya
- Language: Chinese
- Subject: History of early China
- Publisher: Shanghai Chinese Classics Publishing House
- Publication date: 2013
- Publication place: People's Republic of China
- Media type: Print (Hardcover)
- Pages: 547
- ISBN: 978-7-5325-6759-1
- Preceded by: Benevolence and the Mandate of Heaven
- Followed by: Spirits of Heaven and Ways of Heaven & Earth

Xia, Shang, Zhou Dynasties: From Myths to Historical Facts is a book by a Taiwan-based Russian history professor Olga Gorodetskaya. It touches upon several predominant theories regarding Ancient China's earliest dynasties, namely Xia dynasty, Shang dynasty and Zhou dynasty, and tries to present archaeological evidence that those theories are in fact myths originated in early Chinese historical works, which resemble hagiographies and have little basis in reality on the ground. The book and as a result its author are a subject of considerable controversy within the Sinological academia, especially so within the People's Republic of China.
