= Benevolence and the Mandate of Heaven =

2010 book by Olga Gorodetskaya

Benevolence and the Mandate of Heaven: Transformation of pre-Qin Confucian Classics
- First edition cover
- Author: Olga Gorodetskaya
- Language: Chinese
- Subject: Confucianism; Philosophy; Religion; Paleography
- Publisher: Wan Juan Lou
- Publication date: 2010
- Publication place: Taiwan
- Media type: Print (Softcover)
- Pages: 354
- ISBN: 978-9-5773-9673-0
- Followed by: Xia, Shang, Zhou Dynasties

Benevolence and the Mandate of Heaven: Transformation of pre-Qin Confucian Classics is a book by a Taiwanese historian Olga Gorodetskaya (Kuo Ching-yun), published in 2010 in Taipei. The book concerns itself with the Confucian philosophical concepts of Benevolence (Ren) and the Mandate of Heaven and their evolution during the period before the establishment of the empire by Qin dynasty.
