= Spirits of Heaven and Ways of Heaven & Earth =

2016 book on early Chinese religion and philosophy

Spirits Of Heaven and Ways of Heaven & Earth
- First edition cover
- Author: Olga Gorodetskaya
- Language: Chinese
- Subject: Philosophy; Religion
- Publisher: Shanghai Chinese Classics Publishing House
- Publication date: 2016
- Publication place: People's Republic of China
- Media type: Print (Softcover)
- Pages: 919
- ISBN: 978-7-5325-7713-2
- Preceded by: Xia, Shang, Zhou Dynasties: from Myths to Historical Facts

Spirits Of Heaven and Ways of Heaven & Earth: Shamanistic Beliefs and Origins of Chinese Traditional Thoughts is a book by a Taiwanese history professor Olga Gorodetskaya, published in 2016 in Shanghai, China. The book is a treatise on early Chinese religious and philosophical beliefs.
