= The Alaska Kid =

- Starring: Mark Pillow; Donovan Scott; Dawn Merrick; Craig Allan; Raimund Harmstorf; Alexander Kuznetsov; Wladimir Soschalsky; John Phillip Law; Robert Fuller; Ivan Desny; Edward Żentara; Eric Douglas; Anja Kruse; Ingeborga Dapkūnaitė; Paul Butkevich; Baadur Tsuladze
- Country of origin: Germany; Russia; Poland
- No. of seasons: 1
- No. of episodes: 13

Production
- Running time: 50 minutes each

Original release
- Network: ZDF
- Release: 1 December – 22 December 1993

The Alaska Kid is a 1991 German-Russian-Polish television miniseries, based on Jack London's 1912 short story anthology, Smoke Bellew. It was directed by James Hill. First broadcast on the German ZDF network in December 1993, the series stars Mark Pillow as "The Alaska Kid" Jack Bellew, a newspaper reporter on his beat during the Klondike Gold Rush in Alaska.

== Episodes ==
No.	Title	Original release date
1	"Im Goldrausch"	1 December 1993
2	"Lebendig begraben"	2 December 1993
3	"Das Jungfernfeuer"	6 December 1993
4	"Das Wunder der Liebe"	7 December 1993
5	"Ansturm auf Squaw Creek"	8 December 1993
6	"Kid muß hängen"	9 December 1993
7	"König des Roulettes"	13 December 1993
8	"Tötet Kid Bellew"	14 December 1993
9	"Der Kampf des Jahres"	15 December 1993
10	"Das große Rennen"	16 December 1993
11	"Tödliches Poker"	20 December 1993
12	"Mit vorgehaltenem Gewehr"	21 December 1993
13	"Entscheidung im Ewigen Eis"	22 December 1993

== See also ==
- List of German television series
