= Xingan County =

Xingan County 新干县 Sinkan
- County
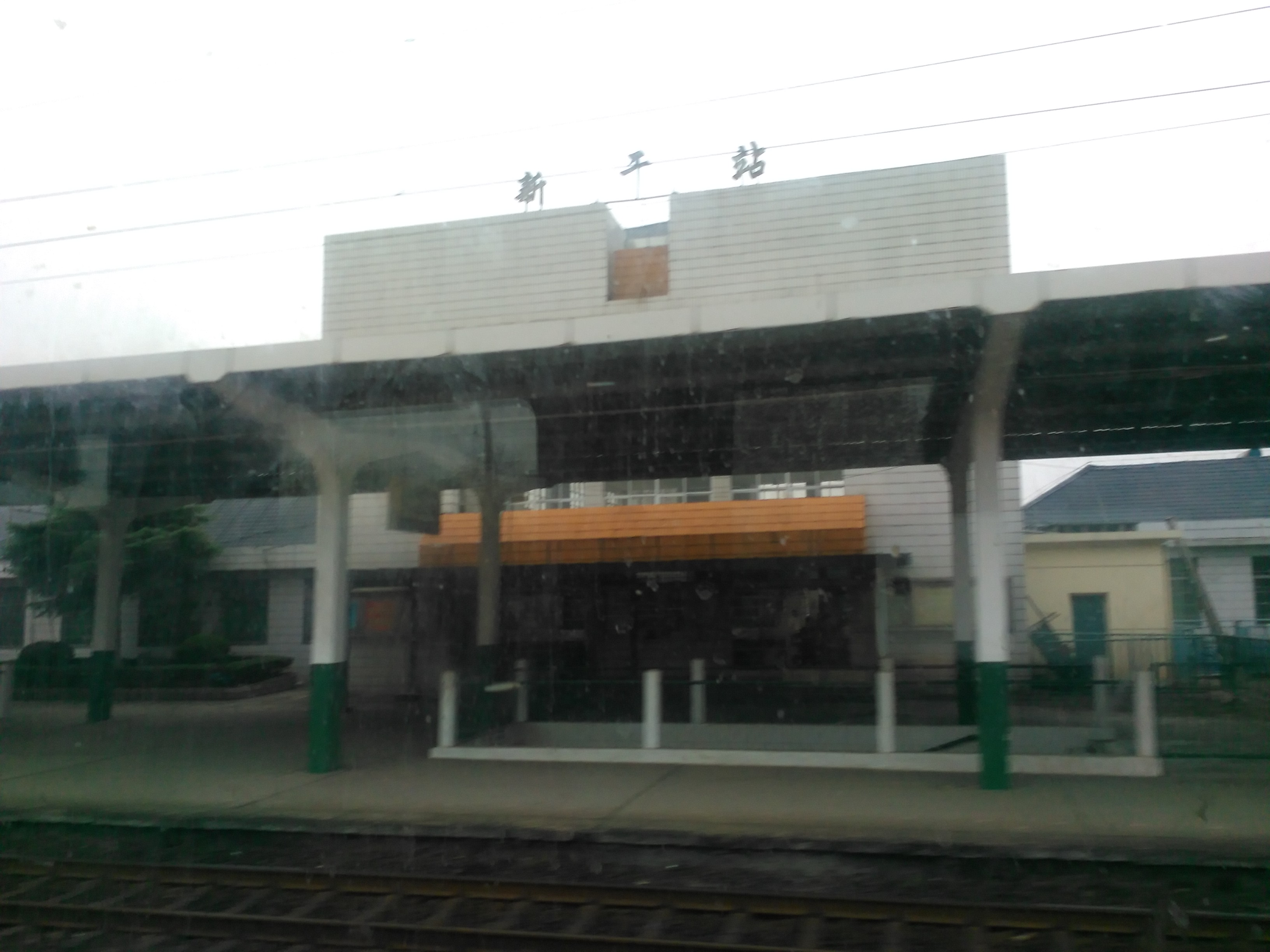
- Xingan Railway Station

- Location of Xingan County (red) in Ji'an City (darker yellow) and Jiangxi (lighter yellow)
- Coordinates: 27°44′31″N 115°22′51″E
- Country: People's Republic of China
- Province: Jiangxi
- Prefecture-level city: Ji'an
- Seat: Jinchuan Town

Area
  - Total: 1,245 km^{2} (481 sq mi)

Population (2010)
  - Total: 329,830
  - Density: 264.9/km^{2} (686.1/sq mi)
- Time zone: UTC+8 (China Standard)
- Postal Code: 331300
- Area code: 0796
- Vehicle registration: 赣D
- Website: www.xingan.gov.cn

Xingan County (simplified Chinese: 新干县; traditional Chinese: 新幹縣; pinyin: Xīn'gàn Xiàn, formerly 新淦) is a county in the central part of Jiangxi province, People's Republic of China. It is the northernmost county-level division of the prefecture-level city of Ji'an, with a total area of 1,245 km^{2} (481 sq mi). Its population was 329,830 at the 2010 census.

== History ==
Xingan County was set up in year 221 BCE. It is one of the 18 ancient counties in Jiangxi province.

In 1957 the Chinese character name was changed from 新淦 to 新干.

== Administration ==
Xingan has jurisdiction over 6 towns, 7 townships and 2 state-run farm or forestry areas. The seat of the county locates at the Jinchuan Town.

6 towns

- Jinchuan (金川镇)
- Sanhu (三湖镇)
- Dayangzhou (大洋洲镇)
- Qiqin (七琴镇)
- Maixie (麦斜镇)
- Jiebu (界埠镇)

7 townships

- Lijiang (溧江乡)
- Taoxi (桃溪乡)
- Chengshang (城上乡)
- Tanqiu (潭丘乡)
- Shenzhengqiao (神政桥乡)
- Yijiang (沂江乡)
- Hepu (荷浦乡)

== Demographics ==
The population of the county was 293,991 in 1999. At the 2010 census the population was 329,830.

== Climate ==
Climate data for Xingan, elevation 47 m (154 ft), (1991–2020 normals, extremes 1981–2010)
Month	Jan	Feb	Mar	Apr	May	Jun	Jul	Aug	Sep	Oct	Nov	Dec	Year
Record high °C (°F)	25.7 (78.3)	30.6 (87.1)	33.3 (91.9)	35.7 (96.3)	35.8 (96.4)	37.4 (99.3)	40.4 (104.7)	40.5 (104.9)	38.3 (100.9)	35.9 (96.6)	32.4 (90.3)	24.3 (75.7)	40.5 (104.9)
Mean daily maximum °C (°F)	9.7 (49.5)	12.7 (54.9)	16.7 (62.1)	23.4 (74.1)	27.9 (82.2)	30.7 (87.3)	34.5 (94.1)	33.8 (92.8)	30.0 (86.0)	24.8 (76.6)	18.7 (65.7)	12.4 (54.3)	22.9 (73.3)
Daily mean °C (°F)	6.0 (42.8)	8.7 (47.7)	12.5 (54.5)	18.8 (65.8)	23.4 (74.1)	26.6 (79.9)	29.8 (85.6)	29.0 (84.2)	25.3 (77.5)	19.8 (67.6)	13.7 (56.7)	7.9 (46.2)	18.5 (65.2)
Mean daily minimum °C (°F)	3.4 (38.1)	5.8 (42.4)	9.5 (49.1)	15.4 (59.7)	20.0 (68.0)	23.4 (74.1)	26.1 (79.0)	25.5 (77.9)	21.8 (71.2)	16.0 (60.8)	10.2 (50.4)	4.7 (40.5)	15.2 (59.3)
Record low °C (°F)	−5.5 (22.1)	−8.4 (16.9)	−3.4 (25.9)	1.6 (34.9)	10.4 (50.7)	13.3 (55.9)	18.7 (65.7)	18.0 (64.4)	12.5 (54.5)	2.6 (36.7)	−2.5 (27.5)	−8.9 (16.0)	−8.9 (16.0)
Average precipitation mm (inches)	79.8 (3.14)	94.2 (3.71)	193.9 (7.63)	207.5 (8.17)	234.8 (9.24)	269.8 (10.62)	144.2 (5.68)	121.3 (4.78)	74.3 (2.93)	48.0 (1.89)	83.9 (3.30)	62.4 (2.46)	1,614.1 (63.55)
Average precipitation days (≥ 0.1 mm)	14.0	13.8	18.2	17.2	16.5	15.7	11.0	11.1	7.9	7.5	9.7	10.3	152.9
Average snowy days	2.3	1.4	0.1	0	0	0	0	0	0	0	0	0.7	4.5
Average relative humidity (%)	81	81	82	80	80	81	74	77	78	76	79	78	79
Mean monthly sunshine hours	69.7	74.4	80.7	110.4	133.6	134.3	225.8	208.6	168.2	148.3	115.3	108.0	1,577.3
Percentage possible sunshine	21	23	22	29	32	32	53	52	46	42	36	34	35
Source: China Meteorological Administration

== Places of interests ==
- Dayangzhou site
