= Horodecki =

Horodecki is a Polish language surname. It corresponds to the Russian language surname Gorodetsky. Notable people with the surname include:

- Chris Horodecki (born 1987), Polish-Canadian mixed martial artist
- Michał Horodecki (born 1973), Polish physicist
- Paweł Horodecki (born 1971), Polish physicist
- Ryszard Horodecki (born 1943), Polish physicist
- Władysław Horodecki (1863–1930), Polish architect and big-game hunter
