= Serenada (film) =

- Written by: Qarltos Khotivari; Revaz Gabriadze
- Directed by: Qarltos Khotivari
- Starring: Lali Habazashvili; Ramaz Giorgobiani; Zozo Bakradze
- Country of origin: Soviet Union
- Original language: Georgian

Production
- Producer: Guram Begiashvili
- Cinematography: Yuri Kikabidze
- Running time: 25 min
- Production company: Georgia Telefilm Studio

Original release
- Release: 1968

Serenada (Russian: Серенада) is a 1968 Soviet short film directed by Qarltos Khotivari.

== Plot ==
Storekeeper Zozo and worker Intermediate Ramaz throughout the film are a desperate struggle for the heart timekeeper Lali. In this struggle, there is no room for sentimentality. Everything is decided by brute male force.

== Cast ==
- Lali Habazashvili as Lali
- Ramaz Giorgobiani as Ramaz
- Zozo Bakradze as Zozo Avtandilych, storekeeper
- Baadur Tsuladze as warehouse worker, Avtandilych's friend
- Nino Dumbadze as episode
- Vakhtang Kukhianidze
- Tengiz Malania

== Awards ==
- Are two awards — for best director and the prize of the Union of Cinematographers — at the III All-Union festival of television films (1969, Leningrad)
