= Baadur Tsuladze =

Soviet-Georgian actor, director and screenwriter (1935–2018)

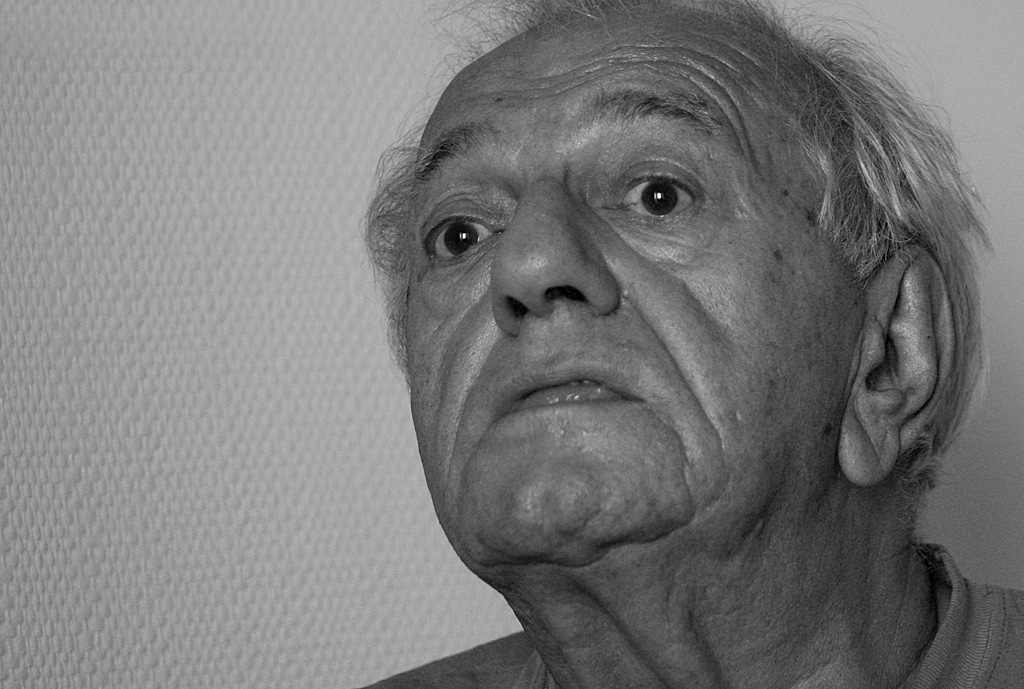
- Born: Baadur Sokratovich Tsuladze; 5 March 1935; Batumi, Soviet Union
- Died: 13 May 2018 (aged 83); Tbilisi, Georgia
- Occupations: actor film director screenwriter theater teacher
- Years active: 1954-2018

Baadur Tsuladze (Georgian: ბაადურ წულაძე; 5 March 1935 – 13 May 2018) was a Georgian actor, film director, writer and broadcaster. Honored Artist of the Georgian SSR (1979).

== Biography ==
In 1961, Tsuladze graduated from the Directing Department of VGIK (workshop of Alexander Dovzhenko and Mikheil Chiaureli). Actor and director of the film studio Kartuli Pilmi. He worked as the director of dubbing. President of the Screen Actors Guild of Georgia, Member of the Board of the Union of Cinematographers of Georgia. She teaches acting at the Institute of Theatre and Cinema of Shota Rustaveli.

Baadur Tsuladze was a former presenter of culinary transmission on Georgian TV.

== Death ==
Tsuladze died on 13 May 2018 in Tbilisi. He never married and had no children.

== Selected filmography ==
as actor

- 1954 — Strekoza as Professor
- 1966 — Falling Leaves as Archil
- 1966 — He Did Not Want Тo Кill as Khvicha
- 1968 — Serenada as warehouse worker
- 1969 — Do Not Worry! as Vano, fisherman
- 1971 — I, The Investigator as Vaso Kobidze
- 1973 — Melodies of Vera Quarter as politsmeyster
- 1975 — The Adventures of Buratino as the owner of the inn
- 1977 — Love at First Sight as gardener
- 1977 — Night Over Chile as Mary's husband
- 1978 — The Comedy of Errors as Balthazar
- 1979 — The Gypsy as seller caps
- 1980 — Teheran 43 as Deryush
- 1984 — The Blonde Around the Corner as Rashid Rashidovich
- 1993 — The Alaska Kid as Carlucci
- 2000 — 27 Missing Kisses as Miki's friend grandfather
- 2005 — Tbilisi — Tbilisi as Professor Otar Eristavi

as director

- 1962 — Three Songs
- 1965 — Nagrada
- 1970 — Feola
- 1972 — Gladiator
- 1975 — Waltz on Mtatsminda
- 1978 — Break
- 1980 — Good Luck
- 1982 — For Lovers To Solve Crosswords
- 1986 — Our Тurn, Guys!

as screenwriter

- 1982 — For Lovers To Solve Crosswords
