= Olga Gorodetskaya =

Soviet-born Taiwan-based historian

- 郭靜云
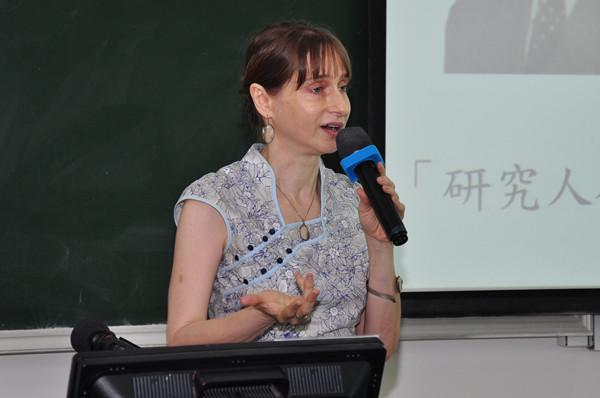
- Olga Gorodetskaya
- Born: Olga Rapoport; September 22, 1965 (age 61); Moscow, USSR
- Occupation: Academic
- Known for: Groundbreaking research of early Chinese history
- Spouse: Lixin Guo

Academic background
- Education: Academy of Sciences of the USSR, Institute of Oriental Studies
- Thesis: "Human" in the historical process of Ancient China VIII-III BC
- Doctoral advisor: Igor Lisevich, Juri Kroll

Academic work
- Discipline: History, archaeology, paleography, religious studies, anthropology, art history
- Sub-discipline: History of Ancient China
- Institutions: National Chung Cheng University
- Main interests: Ancient China
- Notable works: Xia, Shang, Zhou Dynasties: from Myths to Historical Facts; Benevolence and the Mandate of Heaven: Transformation of pre-Qin Confucian Classics; Spirits Of Heaven and Ways of Heaven & Earth
- Notable ideas: Middle Yangtze river as the birthplace of the earliest Chinese civilization

Olga Gorodetskaya (born 22 September 1965), also known as Kuo Ching-yun (Chinese: 郭靜云), is a Soviet-born Taiwan-based historian, known mostly for her research into early Chinese history and archaeology. Olga Gorodetskaya is the author of a contemporary book on Ancient Chinese history, Xia, Shang, Zhou Dynasties: from Myths to Historical Facts. The book and as a result its author are a subject of considerable controversy within the Sinological academia, especially so within the People's Republic of China.

Olga Gorodetskaya is currently a professor at National Chung Cheng University in Taiwan, and also a Ph.D. advisor and Zhujiang scholar at Sun Yat-sen University in Guangzhou, China.

== Biography ==
Olga Gorodetskaya was born in the fall of 1965. From 1983 to 1989 she studied painting, sculpture and architectural theory at the Soviet Academy of Arts. In 1989 she received a master's degree in art history at the Department of Art History of the Russian Academy of Fine Arts Institute of Painting, Sculpture and Architecture. During the years from 1989 to 1993 she studied for her PhD in the Institute of Oriental Studies of the Russian Academy of Sciences, specializing in world civilization and culture. Her major subject was Ancient Chinese culture. In 1993 she wrote her doctorate dissertation.

During the course of her studies, she visited Peking University on an exchange program. She also participated in an archaeological excavation in Crimea. During the period from 1982 to 1989, she worked at the Pushkin State Museum of Fine Arts. Then, from 1989 to 1992, she worked at the State Museum of Oriental Art. Finally, during her last years in Moscow from 1993 to 2003, she worked as an assistant researcher at the Institute of Oriental Studies of the Russian Academy of Sciences.

In 2003, she went to Taiwan, where she had several small-time jobs at first: working at the National Palace Museum; as a visiting scholar in the Center for Chinese Studies at the National Central Library of Taiwan; as a postdoctoral researcher at the Institute of History; as an associate professor at Huafan University; as a visiting fellow at Academia Sinica; and in different positions at other schools. From 2007 to 2008 she had been a professor at the Sun Yat-sen University in Guangzhou. Since August, 2008, she has been a professor at the Department of History of the National Chung Cheng University. During the period from 2012 to 2015, she had also been employed as a visiting professor by the Sun Yat-sen University.

== Works ==
- Benevolence and the Mandate of Heaven: Transformation of pre-Qin Confucian Classics. 2010. Taipei: Wan-juan-lou; 978-9-5773-9673-0.
- Xia, Shang, Zhou Dynasties: from Myths to Historical Facts. 2013. Shanghai: Shanghai Ancient Books Press; 978-7-5325-6759-1.
- Spirits Of Heaven and Ways of Heaven & Earth 2016. Shanghai: Shanghai Ancient Books Press; 978-7-5325-7713-2.
