= Tanheli =

- 炭河里 (Chinese)
- Location within Hunan
- 28°09′09″N 112°06′46″E
- Region: Huangcai, Ningxiang, Hunan

Tanheli (Chinese: 炭河里; pinyin: Tànhélǐ) is an archaeological site in Ningxiang, Hunan, one of major national historical and cultural sites in Hunan.

Situated in the upper reaches of the Wei River in Tanheli village, Huangcai town, Ningxiang, it is renowned as a Bronze Age cultural center in South China. Tanheli is famous as the location where the Four-goat Square Zun and the Da He ding were excavated along with 300 other bronze relics. It was identified as a site of the Western Zhou dynasty (ca. 11th century–771 BC). The core covers an area of 888,600 square metres (9,565,000 sq ft).
