= Panlongcheng =

Archaeological site in Hubei, China

- 盘龍城 (盘龙城) (Chinese)
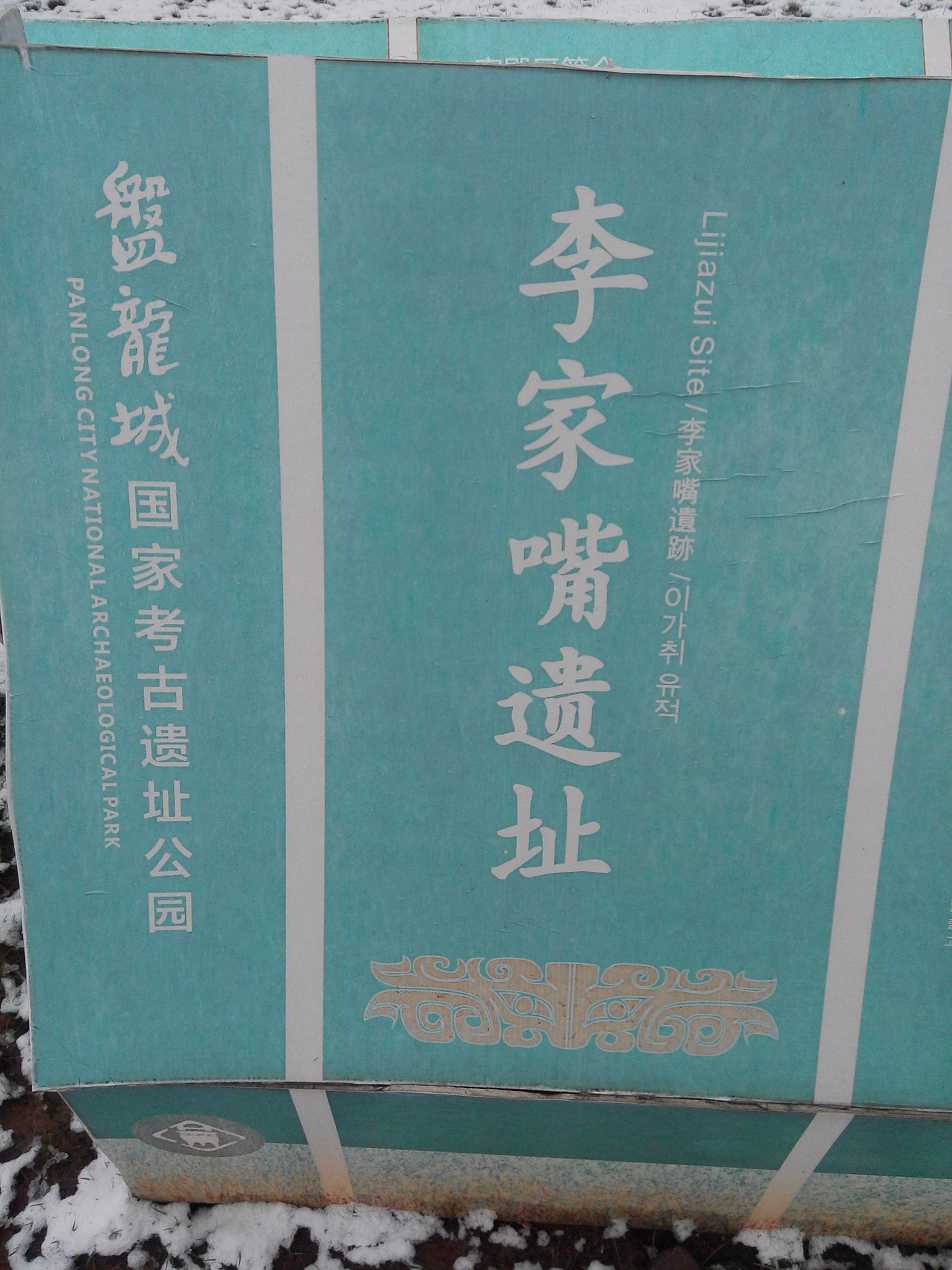

- Location within Hubei Location within China
- 30.6966°N 114.2600°E
- Periods: Bronze Age
- Cultures: Erligang
- Location: Huangpi, Wuhan, Hubei, China
- Region: Shang dynasty

Site notes
- Area: 75,000 square metres (0.075 km^{2}; 0.029 mi^{2})

Panlongcheng (simplified Chinese: 盘龙城; traditional Chinese: 盤龍城; pinyin: Pánlóngchéng) or Panlong City is an archaeological site associated with the Erligang culture (c. 1500–1300 BCE) during the Shang dynasty period (c. 1600–1046 BCE). The site is located just north of the Yangtze river, on the bank of the Panlong lake, and is surrounded by the Fushui river in Huangpi, Wuhan, Hubei, China. Panlongcheng is the largest excavated Erligang site (1 square kilometre or 0.39 mi^{2} at its greatest), showing the southernmost reach of the Erligang culture at its peak. It was discovered in 1954, and excavated in 1974 and 1976.

The site at Panlongcheng was sparsely inhabited during the Erlitou period (c. 1900–1500 BCE), consisting mainly of several small settlements and occupying an area of around 200,000 square metres (0.20 km^{2}; 2,200,000 ft^{2}). During the early Erligang period, the site suddenly grew rapidly, reaching an area of around 1 km^{2} (0.39 sq mi). The central town was 75,000 square metres (0.075 km^{2}; 810,000 ft^{2}) surrounded by a hangtu, or rammed earth, wall. Inside the walls, two palaces occupying 2 hectares (20,000 m^{2}) were discovered. Panlongcheng may have been an Erligang outpost used to control regional resources, such as copper mines.

The construction and bronze casting techniques at Panlongcheng are identical with the techniques employed at Erligang and Zhengzhou; however, the pottery style is different. The style of Erligang elite burials is almost an exact replica of the burials at Zhengzhou; however, later layers show that the Erligang style disappeared during the later stages of the Erligang culture. The site declined until it was abandoned altogether at the end of the Erligang culture. Panlongcheng's decline may have been affected in part by the growth of the site at Wucheng.

In Hubei Province, other sites such as Jingnansi and Baimiaozhu also feature Erlitou or Late Erlitou–Early Erligang type of ceramics.

Panlongcheng was succeeded by regional and localized cultures such as the Feijiahe culture.
