= Vladimir Gorodetski =

Russian professor of computer science (born 1937)

- Born: November 27, 1937 (age 88); Leningrad, Soviet Union
- Education: Military Air Force Engineering Academy in St. Petersburg, Saint Petersburg State University
- Scientific career
- Fields: Artificial intelligence, Multi-agent system

Vladimir Ivanovich Gorodetski (1937) is a Russian professor of computer science, Senior Researcher in Intelligent Systems Laboratory of the St. Petersburg Institute for Informatics and Automation of the Russian Academy of Science.

He graduated from the Military Air Force Engineer Academy in St. Petersburg (1960) and Mathematical and Mechanical Department of the St. Petersburg State University (1970), received his Ph.D. degree (1967) and Doctor of Technical Sciences degree (1973) in the area "Space Vehicle Optimal Control". Main publications (over 250) are related to the areas of multi-agent systems, optimal control system theory, orbital mechanics, applied statistics, planning, pattern recognition and artificial intelligence, knowledge discovery from databases, data and information fusion, digital image steganography, and computer network security.
