= Robert Gorodetsky =

Soviet mime artist and actor

Robert Shimshonovich (Semyonovich) Gorodetsky (Russian: Ро́берт Шимшо́нович (Семёнович) Городе́цкий; born April 10, 1940) is a Soviet and Russian clown and actor.

Gorodetsky to create a recognizable image of a skinny intellectual in a frock coat and a black hat.

== Biography ==
Robert Gorodetsky was born April 10, 1940, in Leningrad in a family of theater artist.

He studied in the studio of pantomime at the House of Culture Lensoviet (Leningrad). He worked in the Leningrad Oblast Philharmonic. Was equilibrists on a wire, valuecolumns on unicycle biking, illusionist, juggler. But in the end it became a clown.

Since 1982, Robert Gorodetsky serves clown-mime theater Litsedeyi (Russian for "mummers" or literally "people who make faces").

In 1991, after the departure of Slava Polunin abroad, Robert Gorodetsky led theater.

At night, December 16, 2005, Robert Gorodetsky was attacked near the entrance of his house on Avenue of Science in St. Petersburg. He had stolen a bag and a mobile phone. As a result, the actor received a severe injury:. Open head injury and fracture of the skull base Gorodetsky had been in a coma for more than three weeks. The criminals have not been found.

Robert Gorodetsky back on stage August 2, 2006, while passing in Moscow "Planet of Clowns" annual festival. To do this, the actor chose his most famous number - Blue Canary.
