= Zhangshu =

Zhangshu 樟树市 Changshu
- County-level city
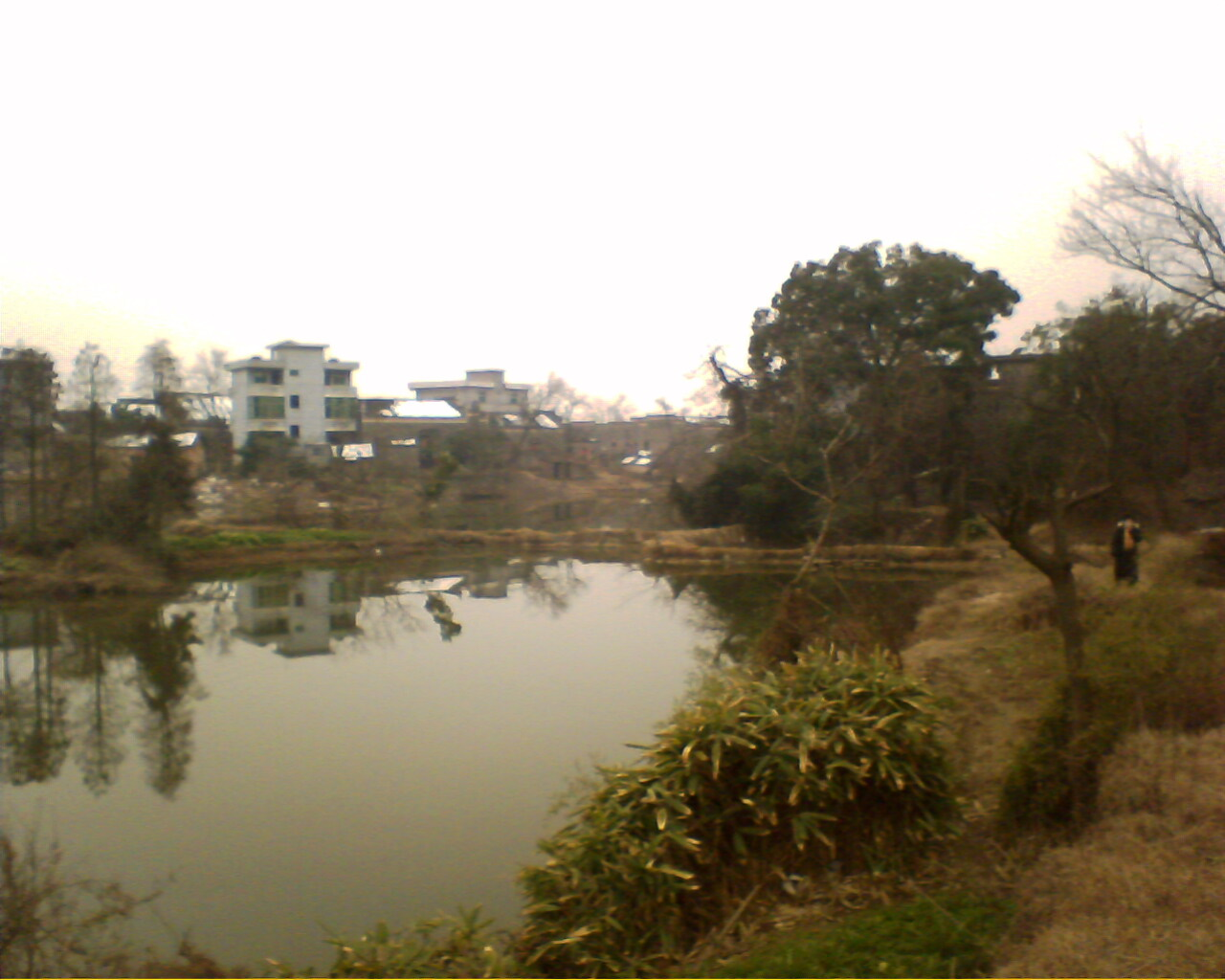

- Location in Jiangxi
- Coordinates: 28°03′17″N 115°32′46″E
- Country: People's Republic of China
- Province: Jiangxi
- Prefecture-level city: Yichun

Area
  - Total: 1,291 km^{2} (498 sq mi)

Population (2017)
  - Total: 609,771
  - Density: 472.3/km^{2} (1,223/sq mi)
- Postal Code: 331200

Zhangshu (simplified Chinese: 樟树; traditional Chinese: 樟樹; pinyin: Zhāngshù), formerly Qingjiang County (Tsingkiang) (清江县), is a county-level city under the administration of the prefecture-level city of Yichun, in the west-central part of Jiangxi Province. It has an area of 1,291 km^{2} (498 sq mi) with a population of 536,500. It is the first county of China Top 100 County in Jiangxi Province. The literal translation of the name is Camphor laurel, because traditionally, the city was a major commercial hub for camphor laurel oil. Zhangshu is famous for Chinese medicinal herbs. The China top 10 medicine producer Renhe Group is located there. Officially, it is the Medicine Capital of China, and there are thousands of pharmaceutical companies. Hundreds of thousands of kinds of Chinese herbal medicines are sold by bulk or by retail.

== Administration ==
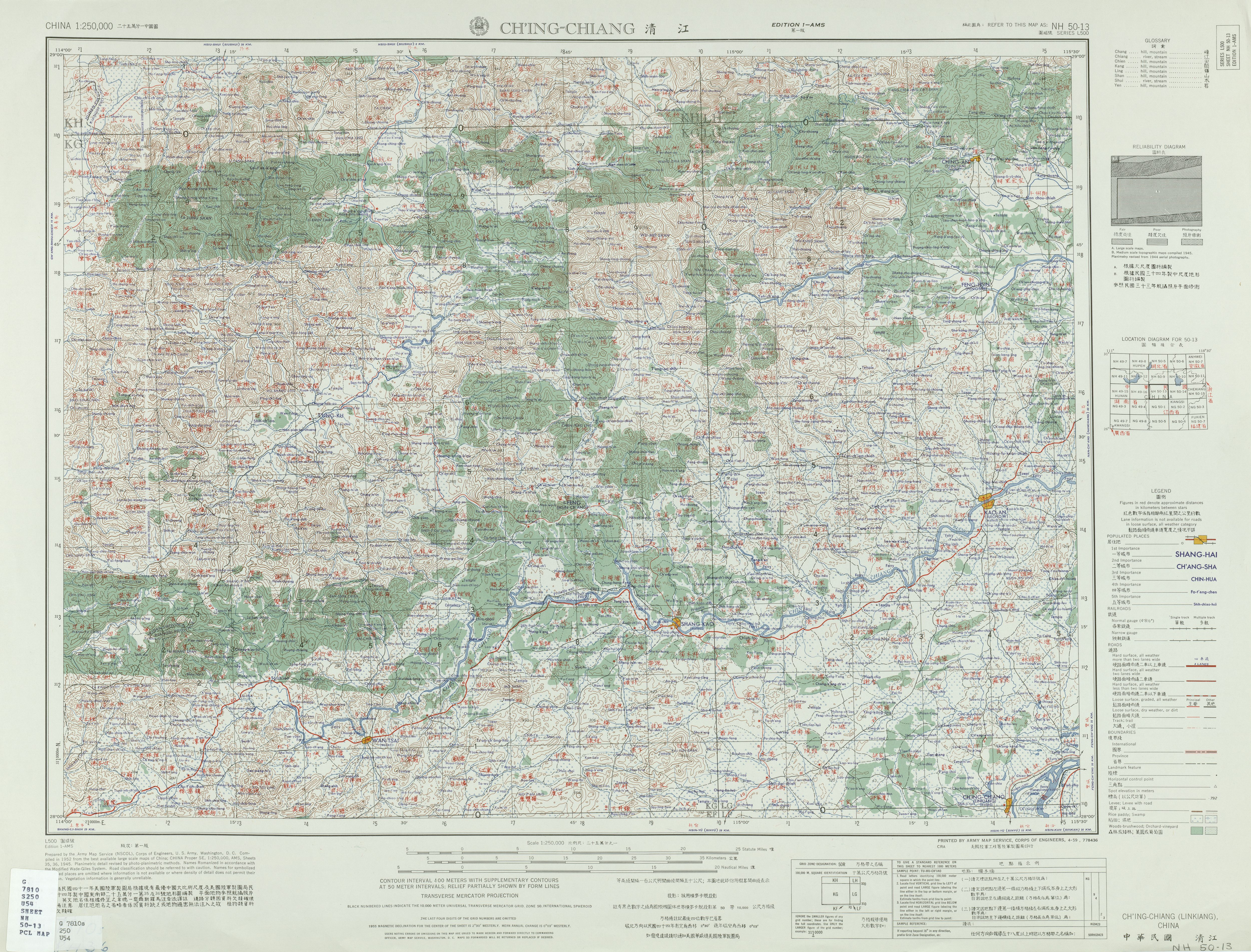
Map including Qingjiang (labeled as CH'ING-CHIANG (LINKIANG) (walled) 清江) (AMS, 1952)

Zhangshu City currently has five sub-districts, 10 towns and 4 townships.

5 Sub-districts:

- Ganyang (淦阳街道)
- Lujiang (鹿江街道)
- Fucheng (福城街道)
- Daqiao (大桥街道)
- Zhangjiashan (张家山街道)

10 Towns:

- Linjiang (临江镇)
- Yongtai (永泰镇)
- Huangtugang (黄土岗镇)
- Jinglou (经楼镇)
- Changfu (昌付镇)
- Dianxia (店下镇)
- Geshan (阁山镇)
- Liugongmiao (刘公庙镇)
- Guanshang (观上镇)
- Yicheng (义成镇)

4 Townships:

- Zhongzhou (中洲乡)
- Zhoushang (洲上乡)
- Yanghu (洋湖乡)
- Wucheng (吴城乡)

== Climate ==
Climate data for Zhangshu, elevation 66 m (217 ft), (1991–2020 normals, extremes 1981–present)
Month	Jan	Feb	Mar	Apr	May	Jun	Jul	Aug	Sep	Oct	Nov	Dec	Year
Record high °C (°F)	26.1 (79.0)	30.3 (86.5)	32.9 (91.2)	36.2 (97.2)	36.6 (97.9)	37.8 (100.0)	40.8 (105.4)	41.0 (105.8)	38.1 (100.6)	36.0 (96.8)	32.7 (90.9)	23.9 (75.0)	41.0 (105.8)
Mean daily maximum °C (°F)	9.5 (49.1)	12.5 (54.5)	16.3 (61.3)	23.1 (73.6)	27.8 (82.0)	30.6 (87.1)	34.7 (94.5)	33.8 (92.8)	29.9 (85.8)	25.0 (77.0)	18.6 (65.5)	12.3 (54.1)	22.8 (73.1)
Daily mean °C (°F)	6.0 (42.8)	8.6 (47.5)	12.3 (54.1)	18.7 (65.7)	23.5 (74.3)	26.6 (79.9)	30.2 (86.4)	29.3 (84.7)	25.5 (77.9)	20.2 (68.4)	14.0 (57.2)	8.1 (46.6)	18.6 (65.5)
Mean daily minimum °C (°F)	3.4 (38.1)	5.7 (42.3)	9.3 (48.7)	15.4 (59.7)	20.1 (68.2)	23.5 (74.3)	26.7 (80.1)	26.0 (78.8)	22.2 (72.0)	16.5 (61.7)	10.6 (51.1)	5.0 (41.0)	15.4 (59.7)
Record low °C (°F)	−5.2 (22.6)	−6.2 (20.8)	−1.7 (28.9)	2.8 (37.0)	9.9 (49.8)	14.6 (58.3)	18.9 (66.0)	20.0 (68.0)	13.6 (56.5)	3.8 (38.8)	−0.7 (30.7)	−10.9 (12.4)	−10.9 (12.4)
Average precipitation mm (inches)	86.3 (3.40)	107.0 (4.21)	205.6 (8.09)	207.8 (8.18)	251.6 (9.91)	322.8 (12.71)	168.7 (6.64)	123.9 (4.88)	80.2 (3.16)	49.5 (1.95)	94.3 (3.71)	67.5 (2.66)	1,765.2 (69.5)
Average precipitation days (≥ 0.1 mm)	14.1	13.6	18.4	17.4	16.3	15.7	10.9	10.9	7.8	7.6	10.2	10.5	153.4
Average snowy days	2.3	1.6	0.2	0	0	0	0	0	0	0	0	0.9	5
Average relative humidity (%)	80	79	81	79	78	81	72	74	76	73	76	76	77
Mean monthly sunshine hours	68.6	76.2	83.4	116.1	134.3	134.1	222.4	209.6	160.1	150.4	117.2	106.4	1,578.8
Percentage possible sunshine	21	24	22	30	32	32	53	52	44	43	37	33	35
Source: China Meteorological Administrationall-time May low

== Education ==
Higher Education:

Jiangxi Agricultural Engineering College

High School:

Zhangshu City High School

Complete School:

Zhangshu City 2nd Complete School, Zhangshu City 3rd Complete School, Qingjiang Complete School.

Junior High School:

Changfu Junior High School, Zhangjiashan High School, Huangtugang High School.

Primary School:

Zhangshu City 1st Primary School, Zhangshu City 8th Primary School, Zhangshu City 4th Primary School, Anyang Primary School, Changfu Town Central Primary.

== Tourism ==
Wucheng Site

Zhuweicheng Site

Fanchengdui (archaeological site)

Mingshui Bridge

Linjiang Grand View Pavilion

Linjiang Bell Tower

Sanhuang Palace

Mao Zedong's House

Zhangshu City Museum

Medicine Capital Park

Mountain Ge Resorts

Zhangshu Guhai Resorts

Zhangshu Waterfront Park

Zhangshu Fountain Square

== Transportation ==
Railway Station:

Zhangshu Railway Station

Zhangshu East Railway Station

Expressway:

Changzhang Expressway : Nanchang to Zhangshu

Ganyue Expressway : Jiangxi Province to Guangdong Province

Hurui Expressway : Shanghai Municipality to Ruili City Yunnan Province

Coach Station:

Zhangshu Coach Station

Jingjiu Coach Station

Wharf:

Zhangshu Gan River Wharf
