= Wucheng culture =

Wucheng
- 吳城 (Japanese)
- Location in China
- 27.984°N 115.26°E
- Periods: Early Bronze Age
- Location: China
- Region: Jiangxi

The Wucheng culture (吳城文化) was a Bronze Age archaeological culture in Jiangxi, China. The initial site, spread out over 4 km^{2} (1.5 sq mi), was discovered at Wucheng Township, Jiangxi. Located on the Gan River, the site was first excavated in 1973. The Wucheng culture probably developed in response to cultural contacts with the expanding Erligang culture, melding Erligang influences with local traditions. The Wucheng culture was a distinct contemporary of Sanxingdui and Yinxu (Anyang).

The site at Wucheng was a regional protoporcelain production center; the culture is known for its distinctive geometric pottery. The Wucheng culture is also known for its bronze bells, the clapperless nao. The Wucheng site at Xingan contained a rich cache of localized bronze vessels. The bronze axes were similar to those of the Dong Dau culture in the Red River valley.

The earliest period, around 1600 BCE, contemporaneous with late Erligang, yielded pottery shards with inscribed symbols. These are unusual among pre-Anyang inscriptions in China in containing sequences of graphs; shards were found with horizontal sequences of 12, 7, 5 and 4 graphs, suggesting that they may be a form of writing, but quite different in form from oracle bone characters. However, the corpus, comprising a total of 39 graphs, is too small for decipherment.

Some of these symbols are similar to Shang writing. Around 120 inscriptions have been found altogether.

The site at Wucheng may have played a role in the decline of Panlongcheng. Both sites appeared to have served as regional, competing centers for transporting resources from the south to the North China Plain. Towards the end of the Erligang culture, Wucheng began to grow significantly, while Panlongcheng declined sharply.

Y-chromosome DNA from Wucheng culture sites shows a very different profile from Liangzhu culture sites in the lower Yangtze, suggesting that their populations may have been derived from separate migrations.
