= Pan Geng =

- King of the Shang dynasty
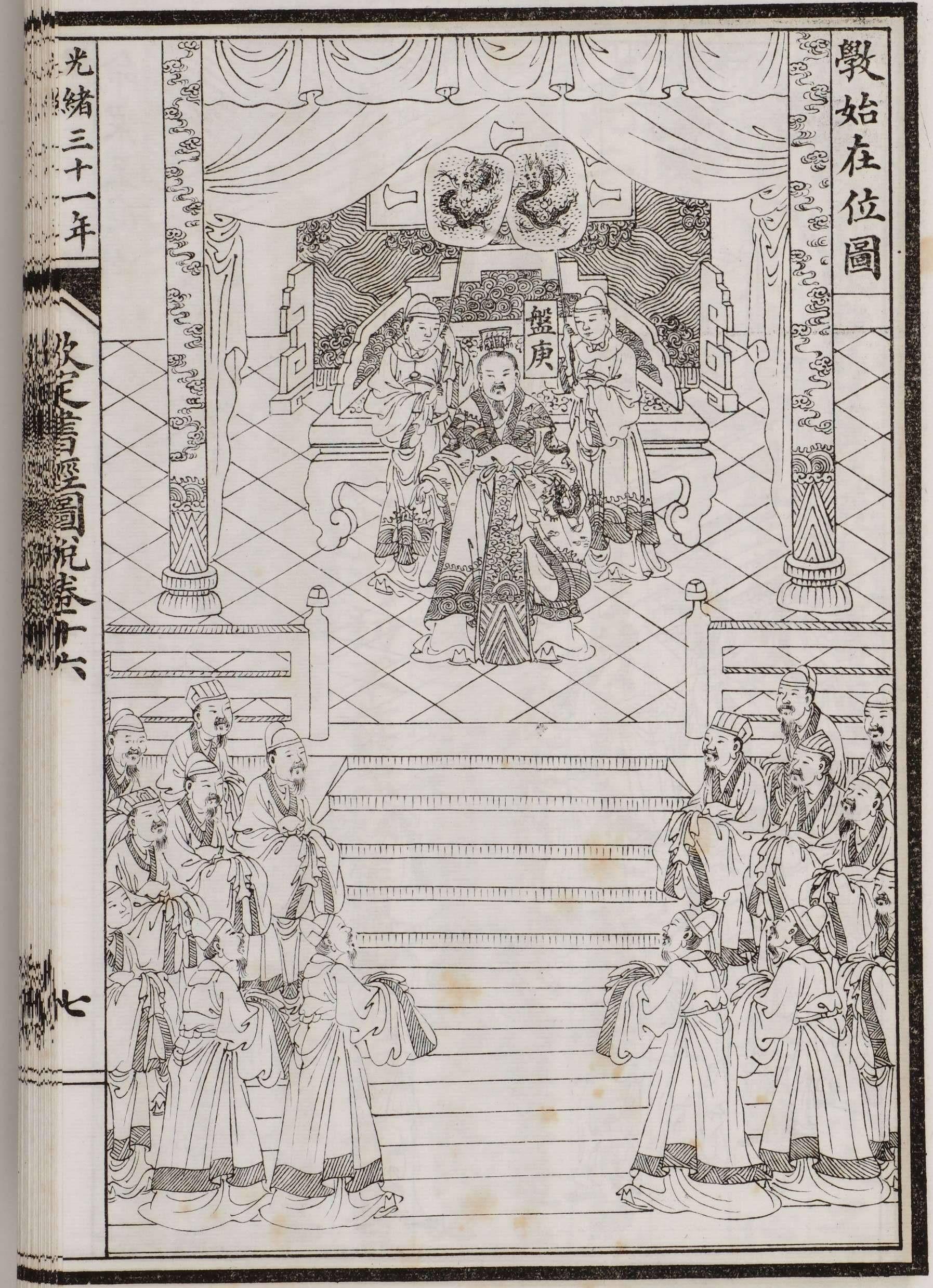
- Predecessor: Yang Jia
- Successor: Xiao Xin
Full name
- Family name: Zi (子); Given name: Xun (旬)
Temple name
- Pan Geng (盤庚)
- Father: Zu Ding

Pán Gēng (Chinese: 盤庚), personal name Zi Xun, was a Shang dynasty King of China. He is best known for having moved the capital of the Shang dynasty to its final location at Yīn.

== Traditional historiography ==
In the Records of the Grand Historian he was listed by Sima Qian as the nineteenth Shang king, succeeding his older brother Yang Jia. Oracle script inscriptions on bones unearthed at Yinxu alternatively identify him as the eighteenth Shang king. He ruled for about 28 years according to both the Bamboo Annals and the Records of the Grand Historian.

The Bamboo Annals provide a brief summary of the major known events of his rule, which are as follows. He was enthroned in the year of Bingyin (丙寅) with Yan (奄) as his capital. In the seventh year of his regime, the Ying vassal (应侯) came to Yan to pay homage to him. In the fourteenth year of his reign he moved his capital to Beimeng (北蒙), renaming it Yin (殷). In the fifteenth year of his reign he reviewed his army at the new capital, and in the nineteenth year of his reign he assigned his minister Fen (邠侯) to Yayu (亚圉).

The Records of the Grand Historian provides a different account of the relocation of the capital. It states that Pán Gēng moved the capital from a location north of the Yellow River to Bo 亳, the capital of the Shang founder Tang, on the south side of the river. It further states that this move was initially opposed by the people of Yin, who were tired of being moved, but that they were eventually satisfied when the Tang system of government was adopted, and the move proved to be prosperous.

Upon his death, he was given the posthumous name Pán Gēng and was succeeded by his younger brother Xiao Xin.

In the Book of Documents, there exists a chapter entitled "Pán Gēng", which tradition holds to have been a speech by this king; however, the language in it is so different from that of Pán Gēng's time that it is most likely not a product of his era.

== Legacy ==
Wang Anshi, in his response to Sima Guang's accusatory letter, cited the example of Pán Gēng's undaunted perseverance in pursuing his goal (movement of the capital) in the face of opposition of both government officials and the common people.

== See also ==
- Late Shang
- Periodization of the Shang dynasty

Pan Geng Shang dynasty
Regnal titles
Preceded by Xiang Jia	King of China; 1290–1263 BC	Succeeded by Xiao Xin
