= Zu Ding =

Zu Ding 祖丁
- King of Shang dynasty
- Predecessor: Wo Jia
- Successor: Nan Geng
- Spouse: Bi Ji (妣己)
- Issue: Yang Jia, Pan Geng, Xiao Xin, Xiao Yi
Full name
- Family name: Zi (子); Given name: Xin (新)
Posthumous name
- Zu Ding
- Father: Zu Xin

Zu Ding (Chinese: 祖丁), personal name Zi Xin, was a king of the Chinese Shang dynasty.

== Records ==
In the Records of the Grand Historian he was listed by Sima Qian as the sixteenth Shang king, succeeding his uncle Wo Jia (沃甲). He was enthroned in the year of Dingwei (丁未) with Bi (庇) as his capital. He ruled for about 32 years before his death. He was given the posthumous name Zu Ding and was succeeded by his cousin Nan Geng (南庚).

Oracle script inscriptions on oracle bones unearthed at Yinxu alternatively record that he was the 15th Shang king.

== Attempts at chronological dating ==
The Xia–Shang–Zhou Chronology Project, a broad Chinese academic enquiry, published results in 2000 placing Zu Ding as a contemporary of the Egyptian pharaoh Amenhotep IV — the latter's reign beginning later than Zu Ding's, but both terminating in the mid-1330s BC.

Zu Ding Shang dynasty
Regnal titles
Preceded by Qiang Jia	King of China	Succeeded by Nan Geng
