= Subutun =

Archaeological site in Shandong, China

Subutun or Sufutun (simplified Chinese: 苏埠屯; traditional Chinese: 蘇埠屯; pinyin: Sūbùtún) is the largest known Shang dynasty archaeological site outside Anyang, located in Qingzhou City (formerly Yidu County), Shandong.

Occasional finds by Yidu farmers were reported in 1931; in 1965−66 a chariot burial and four tombs have been excavated, followed by six more tombs in 1986. Though the tombs were robbed, and site itself damaged by road construction, it still yielded a large amount of important finds. Some of the artifacts bear an emblem of Ya Chou, possibly a clan name.

Archaeological evidence allows conclusion that the site is directly related to the Shang capital Yin (Yinxu), situated 400 km (250 mi) to the west. It is a colony rather than the local culture development.

== Literature ==
- Cambridge History of Ancient China, 1999:219−21
