= Yang Jia of Shang =

Yang Jia 陽甲
- King of Shang dynasty
- Predecessor: Nan Geng
- Successor: Pan Geng
Full name
- Family name: Zi (子); Given name: He (和)
Posthumous name
- Yang Jia (陽甲)
Temple name
- Xiang Jia (象甲)
- Father: Zu Ding

Yang Jia (Chinese: 陽甲) or Xiang Jia, personal name Zi He, was a Shang dynasty King of China.

In the Records of the Grand Historian he was listed by Sima Qian as the eighteenth Shang king, succeeding his father's cousin Nan Geng. He was enthroned in the year of Renxu (Chinese: 壬戌) with Yan (Chinese: 奄) as his capital. In the third year of his reign he sent troops against the barbarians of Danshan (Chinese: 丹山). He ruled for about 17 years (although other sources claim 7 years) before his death. He was given the posthumous name Yang Jia and was succeeded by his younger brother Pan Geng.

Oracle script inscriptions on bones unearthed at Yinxu alternatively record that he was the seventeenth Shang king, given the posthumous name Xiang Jia (Chinese: 象甲).

Yang Jia of Shang Shang dynasty
Regnal titles
Preceded by Nan Geng	King of China	Succeeded by Pan Geng
