= Nan Geng =

Nan Geng 南庚
- King of Shang dynasty
- Predecessor: Zu Ding
- Successor: Yang Jia
Full name
- Family name: Zi (子); Given name: Geng (更)
Posthumous name
- Nan Geng (南庚)

Nan Geng (Chinese: 南庚), personal name Zi Geng, was a king of the Shang dynasty of ancient China.

== Records ==
In the Records of the Grand Historian he was listed by Sima Qian as the seventeenth Shang king, succeeding his cousin Zu Ding. He was enthroned in the year of Bingchen (丙辰) with Bi (庇) as his capital. In the third year of his reign he moved his capital to Yan (奄). He ruled for about 29 years before his death. He was given the posthumous name Nan Geng and was succeeded by his cousin's son Yang Jia.

Oracle script inscriptions on bones unearthed at Yinxu alternatively record that he was the sixteenth Shang king.

Nan Geng Shang dynasty
Regnal titles
Preceded by Zu Ding	King of China	Succeeded by Xiang Jia
