= Xiao Xin =

Xiao Xin 小辛
- King of Shang dynasty
- Reign: c. 1263-1260 BCE
- Predecessor: Pan Geng
- Successor: Xiao Yi
Full name
- Family name: Zi (子); Given name: Song (颂)
Temple name
- Xiao Xin (小辛)
- Father: Zu Ding

Xiao Xin (Chinese: 小辛), personal name Zi Song, was a Shang dynasty King of China.

== Records ==
In the Records of the Grand Historian he was listed by Sima Qian as the twentieth Shang king, succeeding his older brother Pan Geng. He was enthroned in the year of Jiawu (甲午) with Yin as his capital. He ruled for 3 years, was given the posthumous name Xiao Xin and was succeeded by his younger brother Xiao Yi. According to tradition, Xiao Xin was the 49th king of China. Oracle script inscriptions on bones unearthed at Yinxu alternatively record that he was the nineteenth Shang king.

Xiao Xin Shang dynasty
| Preceded by Pan Geng | King of China | Succeeded by Xiao Yi |
