= Xiao Yi of Shang =

Xiao Yi 小乙
- King of Shang dynasty
- Reign: c. 1260-1250 B.C
- Predecessor: Xiao Xin
- Successor: Wu Ding
- Spouse: Bi Geng (妣庚)
- Issue: Wu Ding
Full name
- Family name: Zi (子); Given name: Lian (敛)
Posthumous name
- Xiao Yi (小乙)
- Father: Zu Ding

Xiao Yi (Chinese: 小乙), personal name Zi Lian, was a Shang dynasty King of China.

In the Records of the Grand Historian he was listed by Sima Qian as the twenty-first Shang king, succeeding his older brother Xiao Xin. He was enthroned with Yin as his capital. In the sixth year of his reign he ordered his son Wu Ding to live at He (Chinese: 河) and study under Gan Pan (Chinese: 甘盘). He ruled for 10 years, was given the posthumous name Xiao Yi and was succeeded by his son.

Oracle script inscriptions on bones unearthed at Yinxu alternatively record that he was the twentieth Shang king.

Xiao Yi of Shang Shang dynasty
Preceded by Xiao Xin	King of China	Succeeded by Wu Ding
