= List of Chinese cultural relics forbidden to be exhibited abroad =

The list of Chinese cultural relics forbidden to be exhibited abroad (Chinese: 禁止出境展览文物; pinyin: Jìnzhǐ Chūjìng Zhǎnlǎn Wénwù) comprises a list of antiquities and archaeological artifacts held by various museums and other institutions in the People's Republic of China, which the Chinese government has officially prohibited, since 2003, from being taken abroad for exhibition. Many of the relics on the list symbolize the breakthrough of archaeological discoveries that were made in China since the mid-20th century, when archaeology as a modern science began to take root in China. These items are among the most important excavated treasures in China, and have a particular historical, cultural or artistic significance.

The list was first announced in January 2002, with a second batch of items added to the list in June 2012, and a third batch added the next year in July 2013.

== Government regulations prohibiting exhibition abroad ==
According to Article 49 of the Regulations for the Implementation of the Law of the People's Republic of China on Protection of Cultural Relics (State Council Decree No. 377) promulgated on 18 May 2003:

The only existing or fragile relics among the grade-one relics are prohibited from being taken out of the country for exhibition. The catalogue of cultural relics prohibited from being taken out of the country for exhibition shall be made public on a regular basis by the competent cultural relics administrative department of the State Council.

A first list of sixty-four cultural relics that are forbidden to be exhibited abroad was published by the State Administration of Cultural Heritage on 19 January 2002 (a year before the above regulation was enacted).

In addition to the list of items explicitly prohibited from being exhibited abroad, cultural relics that fall within one of the following five categories are also prohibited from being exhibited outside of China:

- ancient human remains
- the main object of reverence at a place of religious observation
- first-grade cultural relics that are unique and easily damaged
- objects listed in the catalogue of cultural relics that are prohibited from being exhibited abroad
- cultural relics that are not suitable to be exhibited abroad because of their state of preservation

Furthermore, cultural relics may not be sent abroad for exhibition if they have not previously been officially exhibited within China.

== First batch (2002) ==
In 2002, the State Administration of Cultural Heritage announced its first list of 64 first-grade cultural relics that are forbidden to be taken out of mainland China for exhibition.

Name	Period	Place of discovery	Date of discovery	Collection	Image
Coloured pottery pot depicting a stork, a fish, and a stone axe 彩绘鹳鱼石斧图陶缸	Neolithic	Ruzhou, Henan	1978	National Museum of China, Beijing	
Pottery ding vessel in the form of an eagle, from the Yangshao culture 陶鹰鼎	Neolithic	Hua County, Shaanxi	1958	National Museum of China, Beijing	
Houmuwu ding 后母戊鼎	Shang dynasty (1600–1046 BCE)	Anyang, Henan	1939	National Museum of China, Beijing	
Li gui, a bronze wine cup with an inscription commemorating King Wu of Zhou's defeat of the Shang dynasty 利簋	Western Zhou (1046–771 BCE)	Lintong, Shaanxi	1976	National Museum of China, Beijing	
Da Yu ding, a bronze ding cauldron cast by Yu, with an inscription dated the 23rd year of the reign of King Kang of Zhou 大盂鼎	Western Zhou (1046–771 BCE)	Qishan, Shaanxi	1820–1850	National Museum of China, Beijing	
Guoji Zibai pan, a bronze trough with an inscription commemorating the defeat of Xianyun people by Duke Xuan of Guo in the 12th year of the reign of King Xuan of Zhou 虢季子白盘	Western Zhou (1046–771 BCE)	Baoji, Shaanxi	1820–1850	National Museum of China, Beijing	
Four phoenix crowns from the tomb of the Wanli Emperor 凤冠	Ming dynasty (1368–1644)	Changping District, Beijing	1957	National Museum of China, Beijing	
Ivory cup inlaid with turquoise, from the tomb of Fu Hao 嵌綠松石象牙杯	Shang dynasty (1600–1046 BCE)	Anyang, Henan	1976	Chinese Academy of Social Sciences Institute of Archaeology	
Jin Hou Su zhong, a set of 16 ceremonial bronze bianzhong bells from the tomb of Marquis Xian of Jin 晉侯蘇鍾	Western Zhou (1046–771 BCE)	Quwo, Shanxi		Shanghai Museum	
Da Ke ding, a bronze ding cauldron cast by Ke during the reign of King Xiao of Zhou 大克鼎	Western Zhou (1046–771 BCE)	Fufeng, Shaanxi	1890	Shanghai Museum	
Taibao ding, a bronze ding cauldron cast by the Duke of Shao during the reign of King Cheng of Zhou 太保鼎	Western Zhou (1046–771 BCE)	Liangshan County, Shandong	mid 19th century	Tianjin Museum	
Red lacquered bowl from the Hemudu culture 河姆渡出土朱漆碗	Neolithic	Yuyao, Zhejiang	1977	Zhejiang Provincial Museum, Hangzhou	
Pottery stove from the Hemudu culture 河姆渡出土陶灶	Neolithic	Yuyao, Zhejiang	1977	Zhejiang Provincial Museum, Hangzhou	
Royal Jade cong from the Liangzhu culture 良渚出土玉琮王	Neolithic	Yuhang, Zhejiang	1986	Zhejiang Institute of Archaeology	
Warring States crystal glass 水晶杯	Warring States period (475–221 BCE)	Hangzhou, Zhejiang	1990	Zhejiang Institute of Archaeology	
Bronze stand for ceremonial vessels from the tomb of the son of King Zhuang of Chu 淅川出土銅禁	Spring and Autumn period (771–403 BCE)	Xichuan, Henan	1978	Henan Museum, Zhengzhou	
Pair of square bronze jars from the tomb of the Duke of Zheng 新鄭出士蓮鶴銅方壺	Spring and Autumn period (771–403 BCE)	Xinzheng, Henan	1923	Palace Museum, Beijing; Henan Museum, Zhengzhou	
Rectangular bronze mirror from the tomb of the Prince of Qi 齐王墓青铜方镜	Western Han (206 BCE – 9 CE)	Zibo, Shandong	1980	Zibo Museum	
Bronze ding vessel from the tomb of the King of Chu 铸客大铜鼎	Warring States period (475–221 BCE)	Shou County, Anhui	1933	Anhui Provincial Museum, Hefei	
Lacquered wooden platform shoes from the tomb of Zhu Ran 朱然墓出土漆木屐	Three Kingdoms (Eastern Wu)	Ma'anshan, Anhui	1984	Zhu Ran Family Cemetery Museum	
Lacquered picture plate from the tomb of Zhu Ran 朱然墓出土贵族生活图漆盘	Three Kingdoms (Eastern Wu)	Ma'anshan, Anhui	1984	Zhu Ran Family Cemetery Museum	
Painted lacquer wooden screen depicting scenes of filial sons and virtuous women in Chinese history, from the tomb of Sima Jinlong 司马金龙墓出土漆屏	Northern Wei (386–534)	Datong, Shanxi	1965	Datong Museum	
Mural depicting horse riders from the tomb of Lou Rui 娄睿墓鞍马出行图壁画	Northern Qi (550–577)	Taiyuan, Shanxi	1979	Shanxi Institute of Archaeology	
Memorial stone engraved with illustrations of Buddhist Stories 涅槃变相碑	Tang dynasty (618–907)	Linyi, Shanxi		Shanxi Art Museum, Taiyuan	
Stone sculpture of a Daoist deity 常阳太尊石像	Tang dynasty (618–907)	Yuncheng, Shanxi		Shanxi Art Museum, Taiyuan	
Jade ceremonial dagger-axe 大玉戈	Shang dynasty (1600–1046 BCE)	Wuhan, Hubei	1974	Hubei Provincial Museum, Wuhan	
Bianzhong of Marquis Yi of Zeng	Warring States period (475–221 BCE)	Sui County, Hubei	1978	Hubei Provincial Museum, Wuhan	
Carved and lacquered wooden outer coffin from the tomb of Marquis Yi of Zeng 曾侯乙墓外棺	Warring States period (475–221 BCE)	Sui County, Hubei	1978	Hubei Provincial Museum, Wuhan	
Pair of intricately decorated bronze food and wine vessels cast using the lost-wax process from the tomb of Marquis Yi of Zeng 曾侯乙青铜尊盘	Warring States period (475–221 BCE)	Sui County, Hubei	1978	Hubei Provincial Museum, Wuhan	
Wooden screen with carved images of phoenixes and deer, decorated with polychromatic lacquer 彩漆木雕小座屏	Warring States period (475–221 BCE)	Jiangling, Hubei	1965	Hubei Provincial Museum, Wuhan	
Clay sculpture of the head of a goddess, inlaid with jade eyes, from the Hongshan culture temple at Niuheliang 红山文化女神像	Neolithic	Lingyuan, Liaoning	1983	Liaoning Institute of Archaeology	
Duck-shaped glass object 鸭形玻璃注	Northern Yan (407–436)	Beipiao, Liaoning	1965	Liaoning Province Museum, Shenyang	
4-metre-tall (13 ft) bronze tree with a dragon curling up the trunk, and leaves, fruit and birds on the branches 青铜神树	Shang dynasty (1600–1046 BCE)	Guanghan, Sichuan	1986	Sanxingdui Museum	
Ceremonial jade object with engraved drawings of stylized human figures 三星堆出土玉边璋	Shang dynasty (1600–1046 BCE)	Guanghan, Sichuan	1986	Sanxingdui Museum	
2-metre-tall (6.6 ft) bronze money tree with a phoenix perched at the top 摇钱树	Eastern Han (25–220)	Mianyang, Sichuan	1990	Mianyang Museum	
Gansu Flying Horse 铜奔马	Eastern Han (25–220)	Wuwei, Gansu	1969	Gansu Provincial Museum, Lanzhou	
The Qin bronze chariots, from the Mausoleum of the First Qin Emperor 铜车马	Qin dynasty (221–206 BCE)	Lintong, Shaanxi	1980	Museum of the Terracotta Warriors and Horses of Qin Shihuang, Lintong	
Shi Qiang pan 牆盤	Western Zhou (1046–771 BCE)	Fufeng, Shaanxi	1967	Baoji Bronzeware Museum	
Large bronze ding vessel with three handles and ox-head decoration 淳化大鼎	Western Zhou (1046–771 BCE)	Chunhua, Shaanxi	1979	Chunhua Museum	
Bronze He zun, with an inscription recording the construction of the capital at Luoyang by King Cheng of Zhou 何尊	Western Zhou (1046–771 BCE)	Baoji, Shaanxi	1963	Baoji Bronzeware Museum	
Stone sculptures from the tomb of Huo Qubing at the mausoleum of Emperor Wu of Han at Maoling 茂陵石雕	Western Han (206 BCE – 9 CE)	Xianyang, Shaanxi		Maoling Museum, Xianyang	
Xi'an Stele — a stele recording the introduction of Christianity into China in 635 大秦景教流行中国碑	Tang dynasty (618–907)	Shaanxi	1623	Xi'an Beilin Museum, Xi'an	
Gilt silver jug imitating the shape of a leather water bottle, with a design of prancing horses Hejia Village hoard 舞马衔杯仿皮囊式银壶	Tang dynasty (618–907)	Xi'an, Shaanxi	1970	Shaanxi History Museum, Xi'an	
Zoomorphic drinking horn made from agate Hejia Village hoard 兽首玛瑙杯	Tang dynasty (618–907)	Xi'an, Shaanxi	1970	Shaanxi History Museum, Xi'an	
Bronze bell cast in 711, weighing 6,500 kg, originally from the bell tower at the Tang capital Chang'an 景云铜钟	Tang dynasty (618–907)			Xi'an Beilin Museum, Xi'an	
Gilt and silvered monk's staff donated to Famen Temple by Emperor Yizong of Tang in 873 银花双轮十二环锡杖	Tang dynasty (618–907)	Fufeng, Shaanxi	1987	Famen Temple Museum, Fufeng	
Set of eight nested relic boxes containing a relic supposed to be a finger bone from Śākyamuni Buddha, from Famen Temple 八重宝函	Tang dynasty (618–907)	Fufeng, Shaanxi	1987	Famen Temple Museum, Fufeng	
Bronze model pagoda from Famen Temple 铜浮屠	Tang dynasty (618–907)	Fufeng, Shaanxi	1987	Famen Temple Museum, Fufeng	
"Five stars rising in the East" armband "五星出东方"护膊	Eastern Han (25–220) to Jin (266–420)	Minfeng, Xinjiang	1995	Xinjiang Institute of Archaeology	
Bronze table frame inlaid with gold and silver, decorated with figures of four dragons and four phoenixes 错金银四龙四凤铜方案座	Warring States period (475–221 BCE)	Pingshan, Hebei	1974	Hebei Museum, Shijiazhuang	
Bronze ding vessel with iron feet from the tomb of the King of Zhongshan 中山王铁足铜鼎	Warring States period (475–221 BCE)	Pingshan, Hebei	1977	Hebei Museum, Shijiazhuang	
Jade burial suit from the tomb of Liu Sheng, Prince of Zhongshan 刘胜金缕玉衣	Western Han (206 BCE – 9 CE)	Mancheng, Hebei	1968	Hebei Museum, Shijiazhuang	
Gilt bronze lamp in the shape of a serving girl, from the tomb of Lady Dou Wan 长信宫灯	Western Han (206 BCE – 9 CE)	Mancheng, Hebei	1968	Hebei Museum, Shijiazhuang	
Five bronze pieces from an otherwise decayed folding screen, from the tomb of the King of Nanyue 铜屏风构件5件	Western Han (206 BCE – 9 CE)	Guangzhou, Guangdong	1983	Museum of the Mausoleum of the Nanyue King, Guangzhou	
Horn-shaped jade cup from the tomb of the King of Nanyue 角形玉杯	Western Han (206 BCE – 9 CE)	Guangzhou, Guangdong	1983	Museum of the Mausoleum of the Nanyue King, Guangzhou	
Silk painting depicting a man riding a dragon 人物御龙帛画	Warring States period (475–221 BCE)	Changsha, Hunan	1949	Hunan Provincial Museum, Changsha	
Silk painting depicting a man with a dragon and a phoenix 人物龙凤帛画	Warring States period (475–221 BCE)	Changsha, Hunan	1949	Hunan Provincial Museum, Changsha	
Plain gauze robe from the tomb of the Marquis of Dai at Mawangdui 直裾素纱禅衣	Western Han (206 BCE – 9 CE)	Changsha, Hunan	1972	Hunan Provincial Museum, Changsha	
Wooden outer coffin from the tomb of the Marquis of Dai at Mawangdui 马王堆一号墓木棺椁	Western Han (206 BCE – 9 CE)	Changsha, Hunan	1972	Hunan Provincial Museum, Changsha	
T-shaped silk funeral banner from the tomb of the Marquis of Dai at Mawangdui 马王堆一号墓T型帛画	Western Han (206 BCE – 9 CE)	Changsha, Hunan	1972	Hunan Provincial Museum, Changsha	
Brocade banner depicting the Sun God and hunting scenes 红地云珠日天锦	Northern dynasties (386–581)	Dulan, Qinghai	1983	Qinghai Institute of Archaeology	
Nine volumes of Buddhist texts written in the Tangut language that were printed using wooden movable type, from Baisigou Square Pagoda 西夏文佛经《吉祥遍至口和本续》纸本	Western Xia (1038–1227)	Helan, Ningxia	1991	Ningxia Institute of Archaeology	
Red-glazed pottery model of a granary 青花釉里红瓷仓	Yuan dynasty (1271–1368)	Jingdezhen, Jiangxi	1974	Jiangxi Provincial Museum, Nanchang	
Picture of the Seven Sages of the Bamboo Grove composed from more than 300 moulded bricks 竹林七贤砖印模画	Southern dynasties (420–589)	Nanjing, Jiangsu	1960	Nanjing Museum	

== Second batch (2012) ==
In June 2012, the State Administration of Cultural Heritage announced the second batch of 37 cultural relics forbidden to be exhibited abroad, covering paintings and works of calligraphy.

Name	Period	Collection	Image
Pingfu Tie by Lu Ji 陆机《平复帖》卷	Western Jin (266–316)	Palace Museum, Beijing	
Boyuan Tie by Wang Xun 王珣《伯远帖》卷	Eastern Jin (317–420)	Palace Museum, Beijing	
Imitation of Wang Xizhi's Lanting Xu by Feng Chengsu 冯承素摹王羲之《兰亭序》卷	Tang dynasty (618–907)	Palace Museum, Beijing	
Mengdian Tie by Ouyang Xun 欧阳询《梦奠帖》卷	Tang dynasty (618–907)	Liaoning Provincial Museum, Shenyang	
Shanjian Lü by Guo Quan 国诠《善见律》卷	Tang dynasty (618–907)	Palace Museum, Beijing	
Kuxun Tie by Huaisu 怀素《苦筍帖》卷	Tang dynasty (618–907)	Shanghai Museum	
Poem of Zhang Haohao by Du Mu 杜牧《张好好诗》卷	Tang dynasty (618–907)	Palace Museum, Beijing	
Tang imitation of Wang Xizhi's Yimen Shuhan 唐人《摹王羲之一门书翰》卷	Tang dynasty (618–907)	Liaoning Provincial Museum, Shenyang	
Method of Daily Life that Leads to Immortality by Yang Ningshi 杨凝式《神仙起居法帖》卷	Five Dynasties (907–960)	Palace Museum, Beijing	
Self-written Poem by Lin Bu 林逋《自书诗》卷	Northern Song (960–1127)	Palace Museum, Beijing	
Self-written Poem by Cai Xiang 蔡襄《自书诗》卷	Northern Song (960–1127)	Palace Museum, Beijing	
Santie Juan by Wen Yanbo 文彦博《三帖卷》	Northern Song (960–1127)	Palace Museum, Beijing	
Correspondence written in semi-cursive and regular script by Han Qi 韩琦《行楷信札卷》卷	Northern Song (960–1127)	Guizhou Provincial Museum, Guiyang	
Primer to the Surangama Sutra by Wang Anshi 王安石《楞严经旨要》卷	Northern Song (960–1127)	Shanghai Museum	
Zhushangzuo by Huang Tingjian 黄庭坚《诸上座》卷	Northern Song (960–1127)	Palace Museum, Beijing	
Poem of Tiao Creek by Mi Fu 米芾《苕溪诗》卷	Northern Song (960–1127)	Palace Museum, Beijing	
Thousand Character Classic in Cursive Script by Zhao Ji 赵佶《草书千字文》卷	Northern Song (960–1127)	Liaoning Provincial Museum, Shenyang	
Stroll About in Spring by Zhan Ziqian 展子虔《游春图》卷	Sui dynasty (581–618)	Palace Museum, Beijing	
Five Oxen by Han Huang 韩滉《五牛图》卷	Tang dynasty (618–907)	Palace Museum, Beijing	
Court Ladies Waving Fans by Zhou Fang 周昉《挥扇仕女图》卷	Tang dynasty (618–907)	Palace Museum, Beijing	
Gao Yi Tu by Sun Wei 孙位《高逸图》卷	Tang dynasty (618–907)	Shanghai Museum	
Kan Shu Tu by Wang Qihan 王齐翰《勘书图》卷	Five Dynasties (907–960)	Nanjing University	
Chess Meeting with Double Screens by Zhou Wenju 周文矩《重屏会棋图》卷	Five Dynasties (907–960)	Palace Museum, Beijing	
Rest Stop for the Khan by Hu Gui 胡瓌《卓歇图》卷	Five Dynasties (907–960)	Palace Museum, Beijing	
The Night Revels of Han Xizai by Gu Hongzhong 顾闳中《韩熙载夜宴图》卷	Five Dynasties (907–960)	Palace Museum, Beijing	
Gao Shi Tu by Wei Xian 卫贤《高士图》卷	Five Dynasties (907–960)	Palace Museum, Beijing	
Waiting for Ferry in Summer Mountains by Dong Yuan 董源《山口待渡图》卷	Five Dynasties (907–960)	Liaoning Provincial Museum, Shenyang	
The Sketching of Rare Birds by Huang Quan 黄筌《写生珍禽图》卷	Five Dynasties (907–960)	Palace Museum, Beijing	
Light Snow on a Fishing Village by Wang Shen 王诜《渔村小雪图》卷	Northern Song (960–1127)	Palace Museum, Beijing	
Reeds Riverbank Covered by Heavy Snow by Liang Shimin 梁师闵《芦汀密雪图》卷	Northern Song (960–1127)	Palace Museum, Beijing	
Pasturing Horses (After Wei Yan) by Li Gonglin 李公麟《摹韦偃牧放图》卷	Northern Song (960–1127)	Palace Museum, Beijing	
Pasturing Horses among the Rivers and Mountains by Qi Xu 祁序《江山牧放图》卷	Northern Song (960–1127)	Palace Museum, Beijing	
Along the River During the Qingming Festival by Zhang Zerui 张择端《清明上河图》卷	Northern Song (960–1127)	Palace Museum, Beijing	
A Thousand Li of Rivers and Mountains by Wang Ximeng 王希孟《千里江山图》卷	Northern Song (960–1127)	Palace Museum, Beijing	
Latter Ode to the Red Cliff by Ma Hezhi 马和之《后赤壁赋图》卷	Southern Song (1127–1279)	Palace Museum, Beijing	
Golden Halls in Pine Forest by Zhao Bosu 赵伯骕《万松金阙图》卷	Southern Song (1127–1279)	Palace Museum, Beijing	
Song imitation of Yan Liben's Emperor Taizong Receiving the Tibetan Envoy 宋人摹阎立本《步辇图》卷	Song dynasty (960–1279)	Palace Museum, Beijing	

== Third batch (2013) ==
On 31 July 2013, a third batch of 94 items were announced, including treasures excavated at archaeological sites such as bronzes, pottery, jades, and others.

Name	Period	Place of discovery	Date of discovery	Collection	Image
Zilong ding 子龙鼎	Shang dynasty (1600–1046 BCE)	Purportedly Huixian, Henan	1920s	National Museum of China, Beijing	
Four-goat Square Zun 四羊方尊	Shang dynasty (1600–1046 BCE)	Ningxiang, Hunan	1938	National Museum of China, Beijing	
Bronze horn-shaped sigong (wine vessel) with dragon motif 龙纹兕觥	Shang dynasty (1600–1046 BCE)	Shilou, Shanxi	1959	Shanxi Museum, Taiyuan	
Da He ding 大禾方鼎	Shang dynasty (1600–1046 BCE)	Ningxiang, Hunan	1959	Hunan Museum	
Bronze Standing Figure 铜立人像	Shang dynasty (1600–1046 BCE)	Sanxingdui site, Guanghan, Sichuan	1986	Sanxingdui Museum	
Tianwang gui 天亡簋	Western Zhou (1046–771 BCE)			National Museum of China, Beijing	
Bo Ju li 伯矩鬲	Western Zhou (1046–771 BCE)	Liulihe site, Beijing	1975	Capital Museum, Beijing	
Bird-shaped zun of the Marquis of Jin State 晋侯鸟尊	Western Zhou (1046–771 BCE)	Quwo, Shanxi	1992	Shanxi Museum, Taiyuan	
Hu gui 㝬簋	Western Zhou (1046–771 BCE)	Fufeng, Shaanxi	1978	Baoji Bronzeware Museum	
Lai pan 逨盘	Western Zhou (1046–771 BCE)	Mei County, Shaanxi	2003	Baoji Bronzeware Museum	
Sword of Goujian 越王勾践剑	Spring and Autumn period (771–403 BCE)	Jiangling, Hubei	1965	Hubei Provincial Museum, Wuhan	
Bronze square sheng of Shang Yang 商鞅方升	Warring States period (475–221 BCE)			Shanghai Museum	
Bronze hu inlaid with gold and silver netting cover 错金银镶嵌丝网套铜壶	Warring States period (475–221 BCE)	Xuyi, Jiangsu	1982	Nanjing Museum	
Bronze Cowrie Container with Sacrificial Ceremony Scene 诅盟场面贮贝器	Western Han (206 BCE – 9 CE)	Shizaishan site, Jinning, Yunnan		National Museum of China, Beijing	
Mirror painted with people, chariots, and horses 彩绘人物车马镜	Western Han (206 BCE – 9 CE)	Xi'an, Shaanxi	1963	Xi'an Museum	
Bronze Cowrie Container with a Pillar-Sacrificial Scene 杀人祭柱场面贮贝器	Western Han (206 BCE – 9 CE)	Shizaishan site, Jinning, Yunnan		Yunnan Provincial Museum, Kunming	
Human-faced fish decoration pottery bowl, Yangshao culture 仰韶文化彩陶人面鱼纹盆	Neolithic	Banpo site, Xi'an, Shaanxi	1955	National Museum of China, Beijing	
Pottery basin painted with groups of dancing figures, Majiayao culture 马家窑文化彩陶舞蹈纹盆	Neolithic	Datong, Qinghai	1973	National Museum of China, Beijing	
Painted pottery jar with nude figure, Majiayao culture 马家窑文化彩陶贴塑人纹双系壶	Neolithic	Ledu, Qinghai	1974	National Museum of China, Beijing	
Boat-form pottery flask painted with reticulated pattern, Yangshao culture 仰韶文化彩陶网纹船形壶	Neolithic	Beishouling site, Baoji, Shaanxi	1958	National Museum of China, Beijing	
Pottery basin with painted coiled dragon pattern, Longshan culture 龙山文化彩绘蟠龙纹陶盘	Neolithic	Taosi site, Xiangfen, Shanxi	1980	Institute of Archaeology, Chinese Academy of Social Sciences	
Human-form pottery jar, Yangshao culture 仰韶文化彩陶人形双系瓶	Neolithic	Dadiwan site, Qin'an, Gansu	1973	Gansu Provincial Museum, Lanzhou	
Dou saucer with the design of octagonal starstreak, Dawenkou culture 大汶口文化彩陶八角星纹豆	Neolithic	Dawenkou site, Tai'an, Shandong	1974	Shandong Museum	
Celadon gucang urn marked "3rd year of the Yong'an era" (AD 260) “永安三年”款青釉堆塑谷仓罐	Three Kingdoms (Eastern Wu, 229–280)	Shaoxing, Zhejiang	1935	Palace Museum, Beijing	
Celadon tiger-shaped chamber pot marked "14th year of the Chiwu era" (AD 251) “赤乌十四年”款青釉虎子	Three Kingdoms (Eastern Wu, 229–280)	Nanjing, Jiangsu	1955	National Museum of China, Beijing	
Celadon underglaze porcelain vase with winged figures 青釉褐彩羽人纹双系壶	Three Kingdoms (Eastern Wu, 229–280)	Nanjing, Jiangsu	1983	Nanjing Municipal Museum	
Celadon glazed porcelain zun with design of a monster 青釉神兽尊	Western Jin (266–316)	Tomb of Zhou Chu, Yixing, Jiangsu	1976	Nanjing Museum	
Green glazed vase covered with lotus designs 青釉仰覆莲花尊	Northern Qi (550–577)	Jing County, Hebei	1948	National Museum of China, Beijing	
Green glazed white porcelain vase with long neck 白釉绿彩长颈瓶	Northern Qi (550–577)	Tomb of Fan Cui, Anyang, Henan	1971	Henan Museum, Zhengzhou	
White-glazed double-bellied vase with double dragon-shaped handles, Sui dynasty 隋白釉龙柄双联传瓶	Sui dynasty (581–618)			Tianjin Museum	
Green-glazed dragon-handled vase with phoenix top 青釉凤首龙柄壶	Tang dynasty (618–907)			Palace Museum, Beijing	
Speckle-glazed waist drum, Lushan ware 鲁山窑黑釉蓝斑腰鼓	Tang dynasty (618–907)			Palace Museum, Beijing	
Polychrome glazed tomb figurine of a troupe of musicians on a camel 陶骆驼载乐舞三彩俑	Tang dynasty (618–907)	Tomb of Xianyu Tinghai, Xi'an, Shaanxi	1957	National Museum of China, Beijing	
Brown-green-color celadon jar, Changsha ware 长沙窑青釉褐蓝彩双系罐	Tang dynasty (618–907)	Yangzhou, Jiangsu	1974	Yangzhou Museum	
Five-legged celadon censer with cloud patterns, Yue ware 越窑青釉褐彩云纹五足炉	Tang dynasty (618–907)	Lin'an, Zhejiang	1980	Lin'an Museum	
Brown speckled porcelain ewer with dancing figure design, Changsha ware 长沙窑青釉褐彩贴花人物纹壶	Tang dynasty (618–907)	Hengyang, Hunan	1973	Hunan Museum	
Sancai musicians on camel 三彩骆驼载乐俑	Tang dynasty (618–907)	Xi'an, Shaanxi	1959	Shaanxi History Museum, Xi'an	
Water bowl in the shape of a makara, Yaozhou ware 耀州窑摩羯形水盂	Five Dynasties (907–960)	Beipiao, Liaoning	1971	Liaoning Provincial Museum, Shenyang	
Lotus flower-styled saucer, Yue ware 越窑莲花式托盏	Five Dynasties (907–960)	Tiger Hill Pagoda, Suzhou, Jiangsu	1956	Suzhou Museum	
Celadon glazed cadogan-type pot with flower carvings and handle, Yaozhou ware 耀州窑青釉刻花提梁倒流壶	Five Dynasties (907–960)	Bin County, Shaanxi	1968	Shaanxi History Museum, Xi'an	
Light-sky-blue glazed zun container with bowstring patterns, Ru ware 汝窑天青釉弦纹樽	Northern Song (960–1127)			Palace Museum, Beijing	
Celadon vase with bowstring patterns, Guan ware 官窑弦纹瓶	Northern Song (960–1127)			Palace Museum, Beijing	
Moon-white glazed zun vessel with vertical ridges 钧窑月白釉出戟尊	Northern Song (960–1127)			Palace Museum, Beijing	
White-glazed kundika with lotus blossom design and dragon head, Ding ware 定窑白釉刻莲花瓣纹龙首净瓶	Northern Song (960–1127)	Underground Palace of the Jingzhongyuan Pagoda, Ding County, Hebei	1969	Dingzhou Museum	
Zun vase with tubular lug handles, Guan ware 官窑贯耳尊	Northern Song (960–1127)			Jilin Provincial Museum, Changchun	
Vase with tiger and leopard design against a pearl-patterned backdrop, Dengfeng ware 登封窑珍珠地划花虎豹纹瓶	Song dynasty (960–1279)			Palace Museum, Beijing	
Blue-and-white meiping with depiction of the story of Xiao He pursuing Han Xin under the moon 青花萧何月下追韩信图梅瓶	Yuan dynasty (1271–1368)	Tomb of Mu Ying, Nanjing, Jiangsu		Nanjing Municipal Museum	
Blue glazed meiping with white dragon 蓝釉白龙纹梅瓶	Yuan dynasty (1271–1368)			Yangzhou Museum	
Jade dragon, Hongshan culture 红山文化玉龙	Neolithic	Ongniud Banner, Inner Mongolia	1971	National Museum of China, Beijing	
Jade ax with divine figure and beast carvings, Liangzhu culture 良渚文化神人兽面纹玉钺	Neolithic	Yuhang, Zhejiang	1986	Zhejiang Provincial Museum, Hangzhou	
Jade knife with seven holes 七孔玉刀	Xia dynasty (c. 2070 – c. 1600 BCE)	Erlitou site, Yanshi, Henan	1975	Erlitou Site Museum of the Xia Capital, Luoyang	
Jade pendant of the Jin marchioness 晋侯夫人组玉佩	Western Zhou (1046–771 BCE)	Tomb of the secondary wife of the Marquis Mu of Jin, Quwo, Shanxi	1992	Shanxi Museum, Taiyuan	
Dragon-phoenix pendent ornament in 16 parts 多节活环套练玉佩	Warring States period (475–221 BCE)	Tomb of Marquis Yi of Zeng, Sui County, Hubei	1978	Hubei Provincial Museum, Wuhan	
Jade seal with characters "Huanghou zhi xi" (Seal of the Empress) “皇后之玺”玉玺	Western Han (206 BCE – 9 CE)	Near the Han Changling, Xianyang, Shaanxi	1968	Shaanxi History Museum, Xi'an	
Jade openwork table screen with King Father of the East and Queen Mother of the West carvings 镂雕东王公西王母纹玉座屏	Eastern Han (25–220)	Tomb of Liu Chang, Dingzhou, Hebei	1969	Dingzhou Museum	
Jade container with carvings of deities and beasts 神兽纹玉樽	Western Jin (266–316)	Tomb of Liu Hong, Anxiang, Hunan	1991	Hunan Museum	
Jade seal with dragon knob bearing the characters "Tongling Shijiao Dayuan Guoshi zhi yin" (Seal of the Great Yuan State Preceptor presiding over the Siddhartha sect) “统领释教大元国师之印”龙钮玉印	Yuan dynasty (1271–1368)			Tibet Museum, Lhasa	
Golden Sun Bird 太阳神鸟金箔片	Shang dynasty (1600–1046 BCE)	Jinsha site, Chengdu, Sichuan	2001	Jinsha Site Museum	
Golden sceptre 金杖	Shang dynasty (1600–1046 BCE)	Sanxingdui site, Guanghan, Sichuan	1986	Sanxingdui Museum	
Silver belt buckle with inlaid gold and jade 包金镶玉嵌琉璃银带钩	Warring States period (475–221 BCE)	Huixian, Henan	1951	National Museum of China, Beijing	
Gold seal with characters "Dian wang zhi yin" (Seal of the Dian king) “滇王之印”金印	Western Han (206 BCE – 9 CE)	Shizhaishan site, Jinning, Yunnan	1956	National Museum of China, Beijing	
Copper umbrella collar with gold and silver inlay and turquoise hunting pattern 错金银镶松石狩猎纹铜伞铤	Western Han (206 BCE – 9 CE)			Hebei Provincial Institute of Cultural Relics and Archaeology	
Gilt-silver wine-drinking game set "The Analects Jade Candle” atop a tortoise with inscribed drinking strips 龟负论语玉烛酒筹鎏金银筒	Tang dynasty (618–907)	Dantu, Jiangsu	1982	Zhenjiang Museum	
Lacquer box in the shape of a mandarin duck 彩绘乐舞图鸳鸯形漆盒	Warring States period (475–221 BCE)	Tomb of Marquis Yi of Zeng, Sui County, Hubei	1978	Hubei Provincial Museum, Wuhan	
Rectangular casket with lacquered shallow relief with gilt painting 识文彩绘盝顶长方形漆奁	Western Han (206 BCE – 9 CE)	Mawangdui site, Changsha, Hunan	1973	Hunan Museum	
Lacquered liubo chess set 黑漆朱绘六博具	Western Han (206 BCE – 9 CE)	Mawangdui site, Changsha, Hunan	1973	Hunan Museum	
Lacquered tray with painted depiction of Jizha hanging his sword 彩绘季札挂剑图漆盘	Three Kingdoms (Eastern Wu, 229–280)	Tomb of Zhu Ran, Ma'anshan, Anhui	1984	Anhui Provincial Institute of Cultural Relics and Archaeology	
Leather cup with gilded copper ear lacquered in the "rhinoceros hide" technique (2 pieces) 皮胎犀皮漆鎏金铜釦耳杯（2件）	Three Kingdoms (Eastern Wu, 229–280)	Tomb of Zhu Ran, Ma'anshan, Anhui	1984	Anhui Provincial Institute of Cultural Relics and Archaeology	
Pearl Pillar of the Buddhist Shrine (including the wooden box) 木雕真珠舍利宝幢（含木函）	Northern Song (960–1127)	Pagoda of Ruiguang Temple, Suzhou, Jiangsu	1978	Suzhou Museum	
Ivory comb, Dawenkou culture 大汶口文化象牙梳	Neolithic	Dawenkou site, Tai'an, Shandong	1959	National Museum of China, Beijing	
Ivory burin with the pattern of two birds facing the sun 河姆渡文化双鸟朝阳纹象牙雕刻器	Neolithic	Hemudu site, Yuyao, Zhejiang	1977	Zhejiang Provincial Museum, Hangzhou	
Green glass container with lid 绿玻璃盖罐	Sui dynasty (581–618)	Tomb of Li Jingxun, Xi'an, Shaanxi	1957	National Museum of China, Beijing	
Small green glass vase 绿玻璃小瓶	Sui dynasty (581–618)	Tomb of Li Jingxun, Xi'an, Shaanxi	1957	National Museum of China, Beijing	
Red woolen caftan with decorative patterns of nude putti, animals and pomegranate trees worn by the Yingpan man 红地对人兽树纹罽袍	Han dynasty (202 BC – 220 AD)	Yuli County, Xinjiang	1995	Institute of Cultural Relics and Archaeology in Xinjiang	
Embroidered donor portrait with Buddhist imagery 刺绣佛像供养人	Northern Wei (386–534)	Mogao Caves, Dunhuang, Gansu	1965	Dunhuang Research Academy	
Brocade of animal against checkered background 方格兽纹锦	Northern dynasties (386–581)	Astana Cemetery, Turpan, Xinjiang	1968	Xinjiang Uyghur Autonomous Region Museum, Urumqi	
Brocade with Holy Eagles Pattern 灵鹫纹锦袍	Northern Song (960–1127)	Aral, Xinjiang	1953	Palace Museum, Beijing	
Stone drums (set of 10) 石鼓（1组10只）	Warring States period (475–221 BCE)			Palace Museum, Beijing	
Six Steeds of Zhao Mausoleum stone reliefs (The four panels of Shifachi, Baitiwu, Telebiao, and Qingzhui) 昭陵六骏石刻（什伐赤、白蹄乌、特勒骠、青骓4幅）	Tang dynasty (618–907)			Xi'an Beilin Museum	
Rubbings of the Xiyue Temple Stele (Huayin edition) 拓西岳华山庙碑册（华阴本）	Song dynasty (960–1279)			Palace Museum, Beijing	
Rubbing of the Cao Quan Stele (Copy with "yin" character undamaged) 曹全碑初拓本（“因”字不损本）	Ming dynasty (1368–1644)			Shanghai Museum	
Kanmiu Buque Qieyun manuscript by Wang Renxu 写本王仁煦《刊谬补缺切韵》	Tang dynasty (618–907)			Palace Museum, Beijing	
Block-printed Avivartiya text from the Kaibao Canon (1 volume) 刻开宝藏本《阿惟越致经》（1卷）	Northern Song (960–1127)			National Library of China, Beijing	
Block-printed Collected Works of Fan Zhongyan 刻本《范仲淹文集》（20卷）	Northern Song (960–1127)			National Library of China, Beijing	
"Polo players at their game" mural of Prince Zhanghuai's tomb (1 set) 章怀太子墓壁画马球图（1组）	Tang dynasty (618–907)			Shaanxi History Museum, Xi'an	
"Hunting scene" mural from Prince Zhanghuai's tomb (1 set) 章怀太子墓壁画狩猎出行图（1组）	Tang dynasty (618–907)			Shaanxi History Museum, Xi'an	
Gate tower mural from Prince Yide's tomb (1 set) 懿德太子墓壁画阙楼图（1组）	Tang dynasty (618–907)			Shaanxi History Museum, Xi'an	
Court ladies mural from Princess Yongtai's tomb (1 set) 永泰公主墓壁画宫女图（1组）	Tang dynasty (618–907)			Shaanxi History Museum, Xi'an	
"Jin Teng" chapter from the Tsinghua Warring States bamboo slips 戰國简《金縢》	Warring States period (475–221 BCE)			Tsinghua University	
Laozi bundles A, B, and C of the Guodian Chu Slips 郭店楚简《老子（甲、乙、丙）》	Warring States period (475–221 BCE)			Jingmen Museum	
Kongzi Shilun from the Shanghai Chu slips 楚简《孔子诗论》	Warring States period (475–221 BCE)			Shanghai Museum	
Yushu from the Shuihudi Qin bamboo texts 云梦睡虎地秦简《语书》	Qin dynasty (221–206 BCE)			Hubei Provincial Museum, Wuhan	
Mathematical text Shu from the Qin bamboo manuscripts in the possession of the Yuelu Academy 秦简《数》	Qin dynasty (221–206 BCE)			Hunan University	
The Changes of Zhou of the Mawangdui Han Tomb Silk Texts 马王堆汉墓帛书《周易》	Western Han (206 BCE – 9 CE)			Hunan Museum	
