= Shi Qiang pan =

Chinese bronze basin (9th-century BCE)

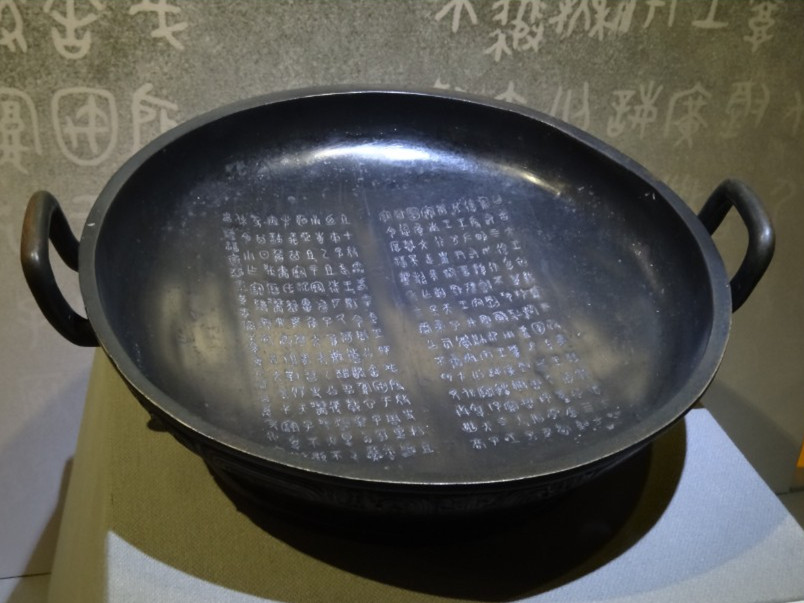
- Material: Bronze
- Height: 16.2 cm (6.4 in)
- Created: c. 908 BCE
- Discovered: 1976; Baoji, Shaanxi, China

Shi Qiang pan
- Chinese: 史墻盤
Transcriptions
Standard Mandarin
- Hanyu Pinyin: Shǐ Qiáng pán
- IPA: [ʂɻ̩̀ tɕʰjǎŋ pʰǎn]

The Shi Qiang pan (Chinese: 史墻盤; lit. 'Scribe Qiang's basin') is a Chinese bronze dated to the end of the 10th century BCE. It is inscribed with a text that has been described as "the first conscious attempt in China to write history". (Note: Falkenhausen disputes this characterisation, arguing that antecedents may have existed that have not survived, and that bronze inscriptions are foremost to be understood as fulfilling a ritual purpose. The text exults ancestors, royal and personal. Falkenhausen (1993), p. 168.) It is regarded as one of China's national treasures, and was listed in 2002 as one of sixty-four cultural relics forbidden to be exhibited abroad. It is kept at the Baoji Bronzeware Museum; a replica is displayed in the Calgary Chinese Cultural Centre Museum. The vessel is low and round, and has two handles. It is 16.2 cm (6.4 in) tall, and has a diameter of 47.3 cm (18.6 in). Its exterior is cast with a taotie design.

== History ==
The Shi Qiang pan was cast sometime during the reign of King Gong of Zhou (r. c. 915 – 900 BCE) for a member of the Wei (𢼸; modern 微) clan, whose name was Qiang (墻). Some time later it was buried along with over 100 other vessels belonging to the family, and only unearthed in 1976, in Fufeng County, Baoji, Shaanxi.

== Inscription ==
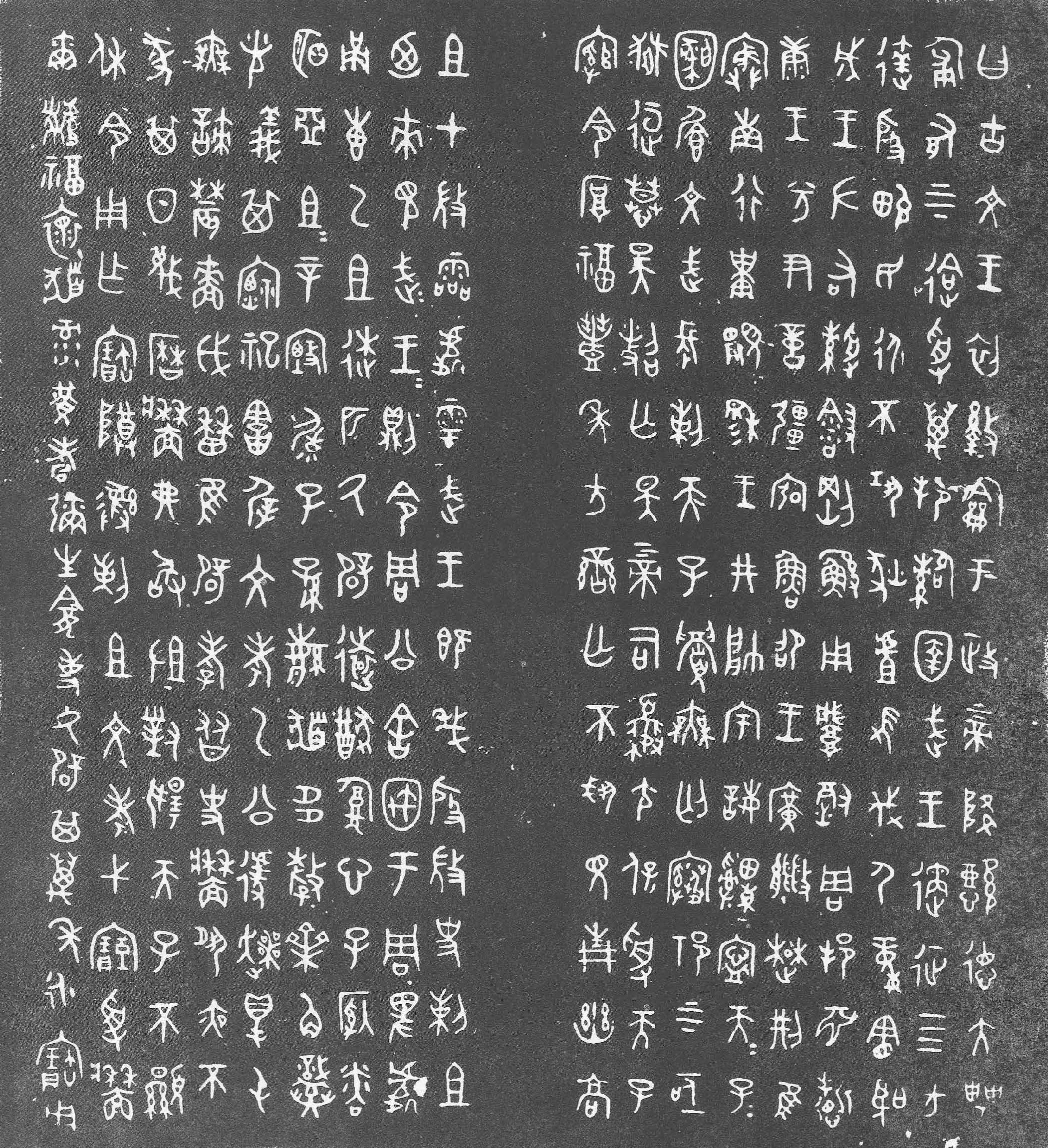
Rubbing of the Shi Qiang pan

The interior of the vessel is inscribed with 284 characters divided into eighteen lines. The content praises the previous and current rulers of the Zhou dynasty, extolling their virtues and deeds, and then recounts the history of the family of the caster, culminating with Scribe Qiang himself. This is in contrast to most inscriptions which detail only immediate events.

The inscription recounts how King Wen of Zhou "joined the ten thousand states", King Wu of Zhou "campaigned through the four quarters", King Zhao of Zhou "tamed Chu and Jing". In all the inscription records the virtues and highlights of the first seven Zhou kings. Slightly before the midpoint of the passage, the inscription begins describing the caster's own family, beginning with how his high ancestor had been moved from a more eastern location to the Zhou homeland around the time of the Zhou conquest. The account touches on such subjects as the appropriateness of Qiang's grandfather's sacrifices, as well as the agricultural success of Qiang's father.

The language of the inscription is difficult both graphically and lexically. Transcriptions are available, but most are incomplete due to font constraints. The fullest treatment can be found in Shirakawa's Complete Explanations of Bronze Inscriptions. Edward L. Shaughnessy has translated the passage into English.

The ritualistic intent of the inscription is demonstrated by positive spin on historical fact: the inscription claims King Zhao "tamed Chu and Jing", while in reality the campaign was defeated and the king killed, within living memory of the casting of the vessel.
