= Hebei Museum =

Museum in Shijiazhuang, Hebei, China

Hebei Museum 河北博物院
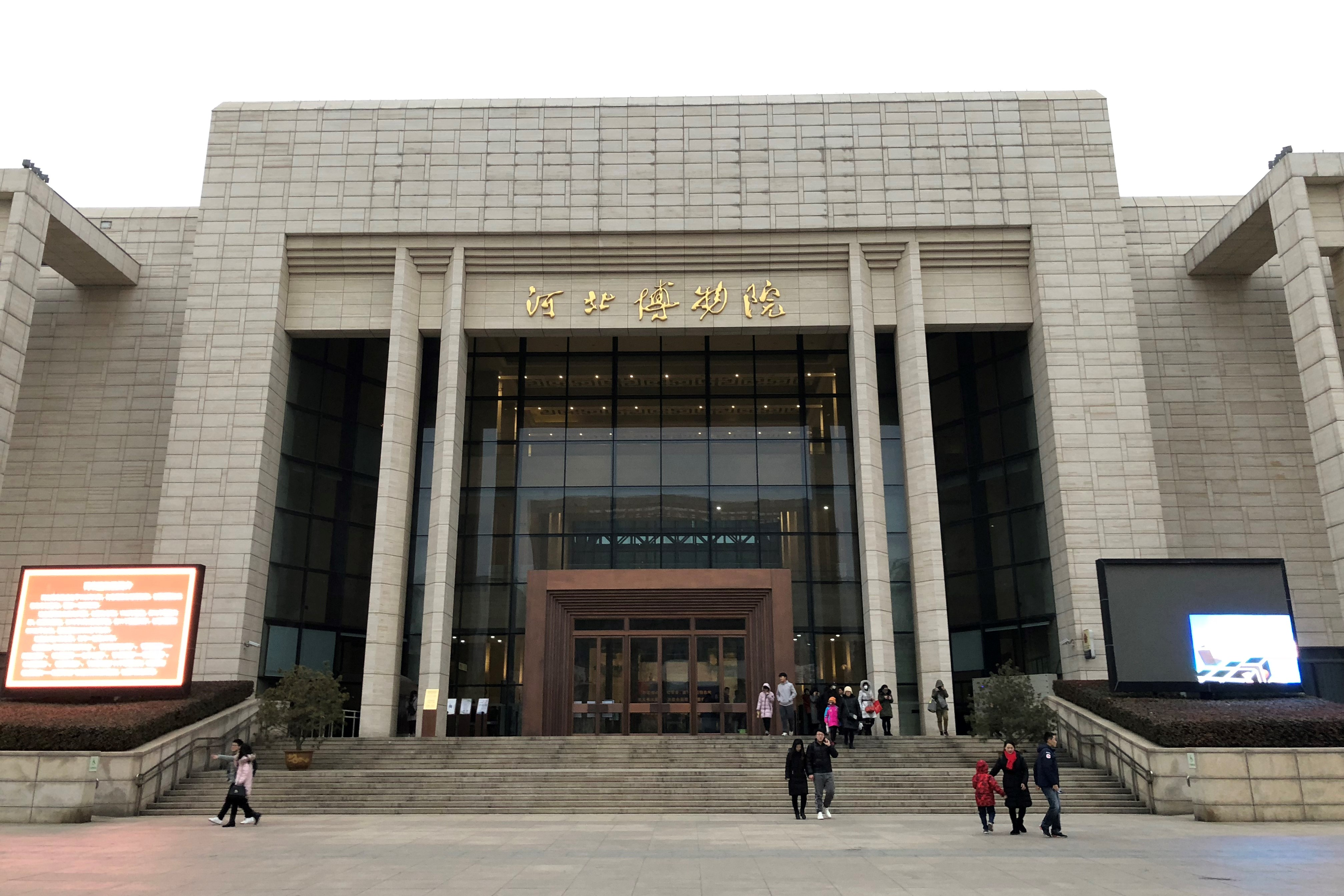
- Established: 1953
- Location: Shijiazhuang, Hebei
- Coordinates: 38.040949°N 114.523183°E
- Director: Wang Jian
- Website: www.hebeimuseum.org

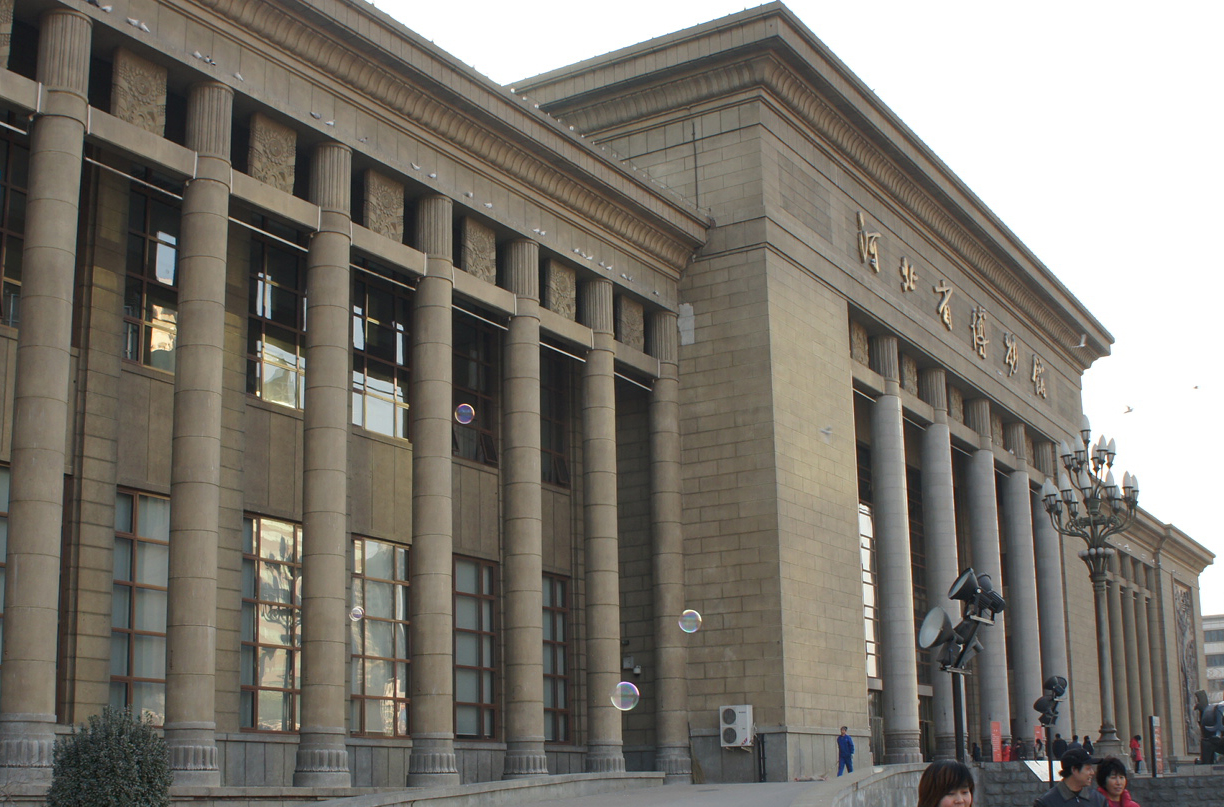
Hebei Museum building, Zhongshan Road front.

The Hebei Museum (Chinese: 河北博物院; pinyin: Héběi Bówùyuàn) is located in Shijiazhuang, the capital city of Hebei Province, China. It first opened in April 1953 in Baoding. After moving twice in the 1980s, it reopened in October 1987 at its present location on South Zhongshan Street. As the only provincial-level museum in Hebei, its primary function is the collection and exhibition of ancient cultural relics.

== Artifacts ==
The museum's exhibition area has an area of approximately 20,000 square metres (220,000 sq ft) and showcases nearly 150,000 cultural relics. Artifacts in their collection include the Western Han jade burial suits sewn with gold thread from the Mancheng tombs of Liu Sheng and his wife Dou Wan; the Changxin Palace lantern, also from the tomb of Dou Wan; and a 2300-year-old bronze lamp, found in the tomb of King Cuo of Zhongshan.

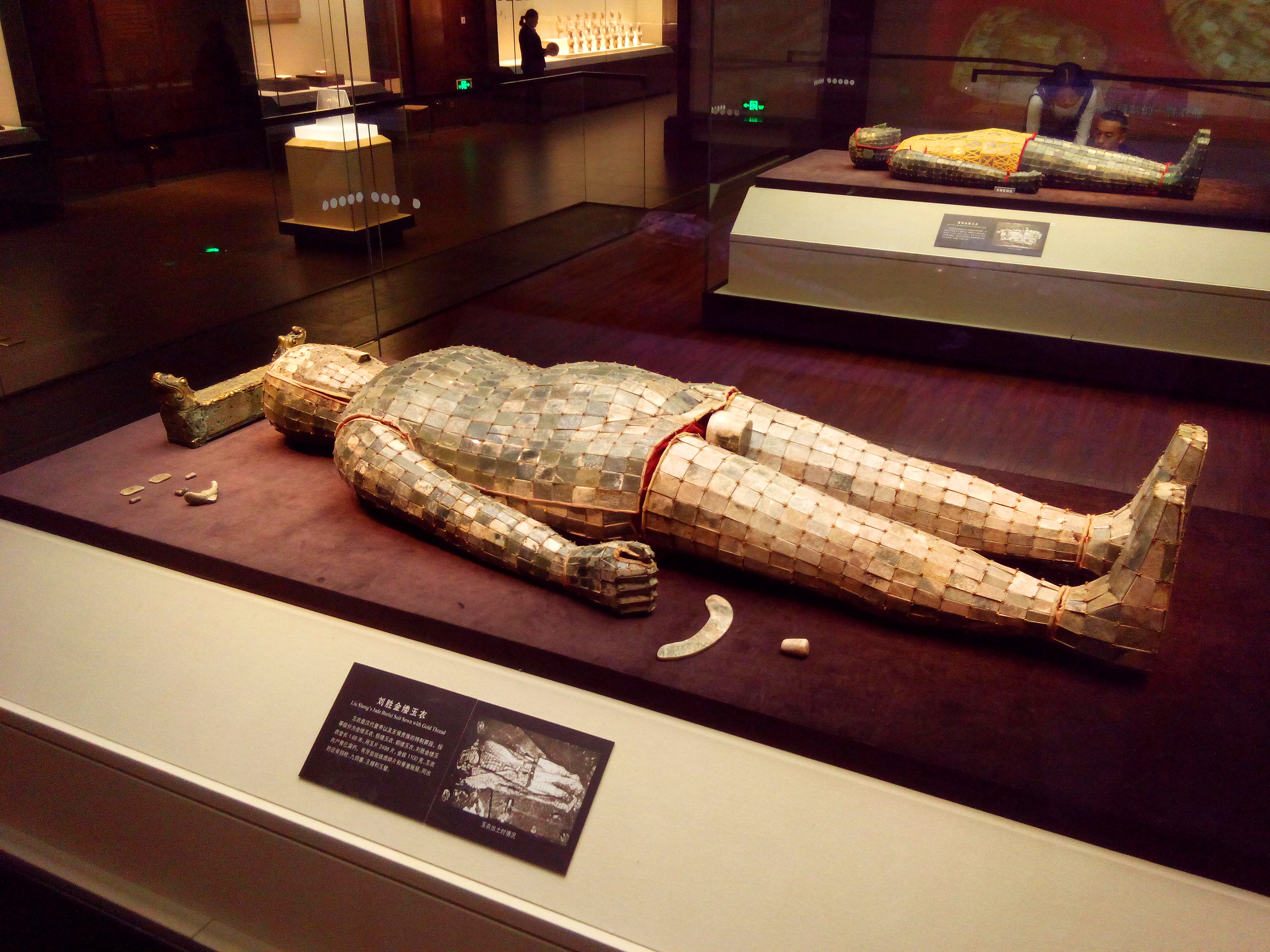
Jade burial suit, c. 113 BCE, from the tomb of Liu Sheng

Hill censer, height 26 mm, from the tomb of Liu Sheng

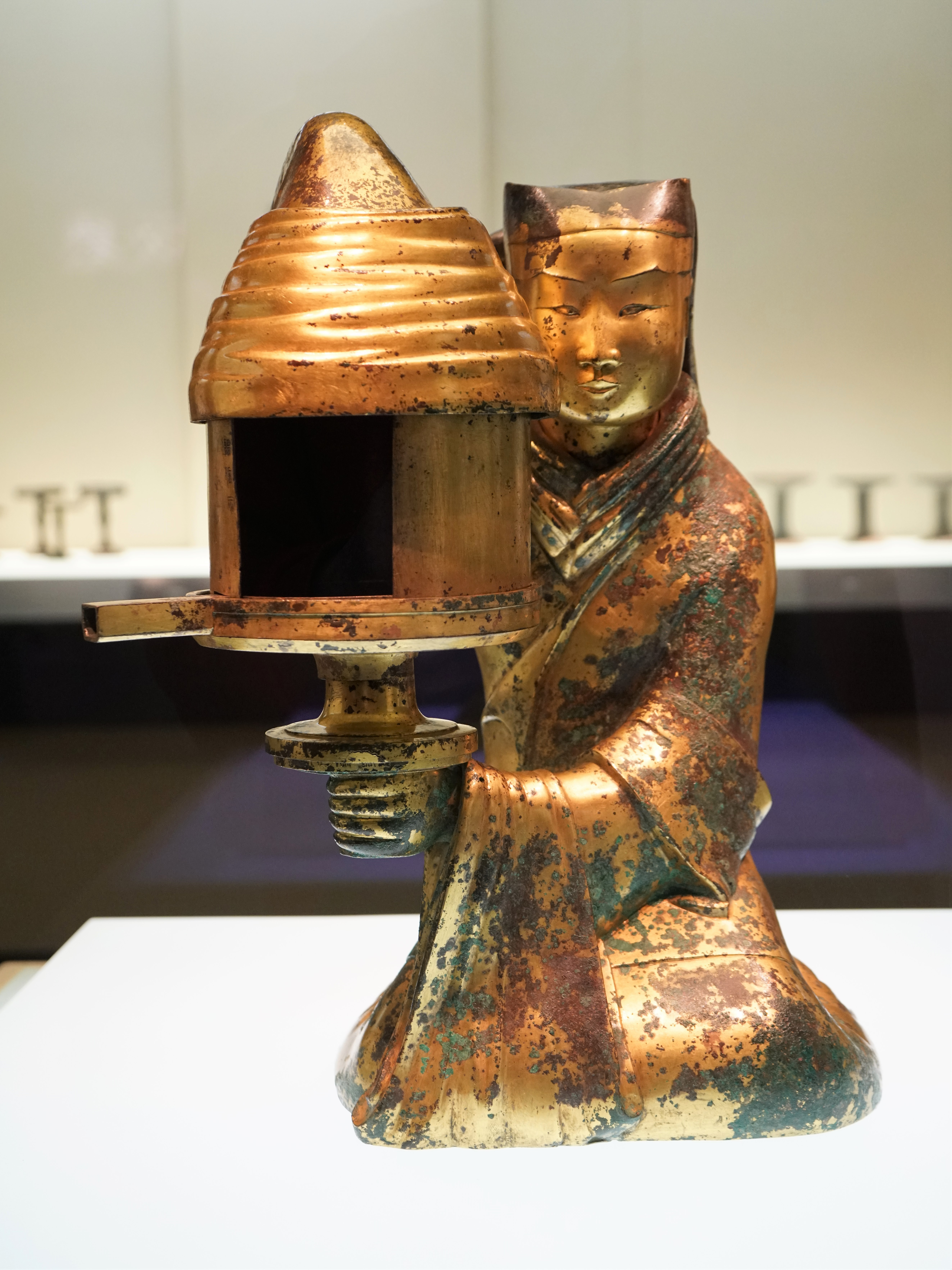
The Changxin Palace lantern, c. 172 BCE, from the tomb of Dou Wan

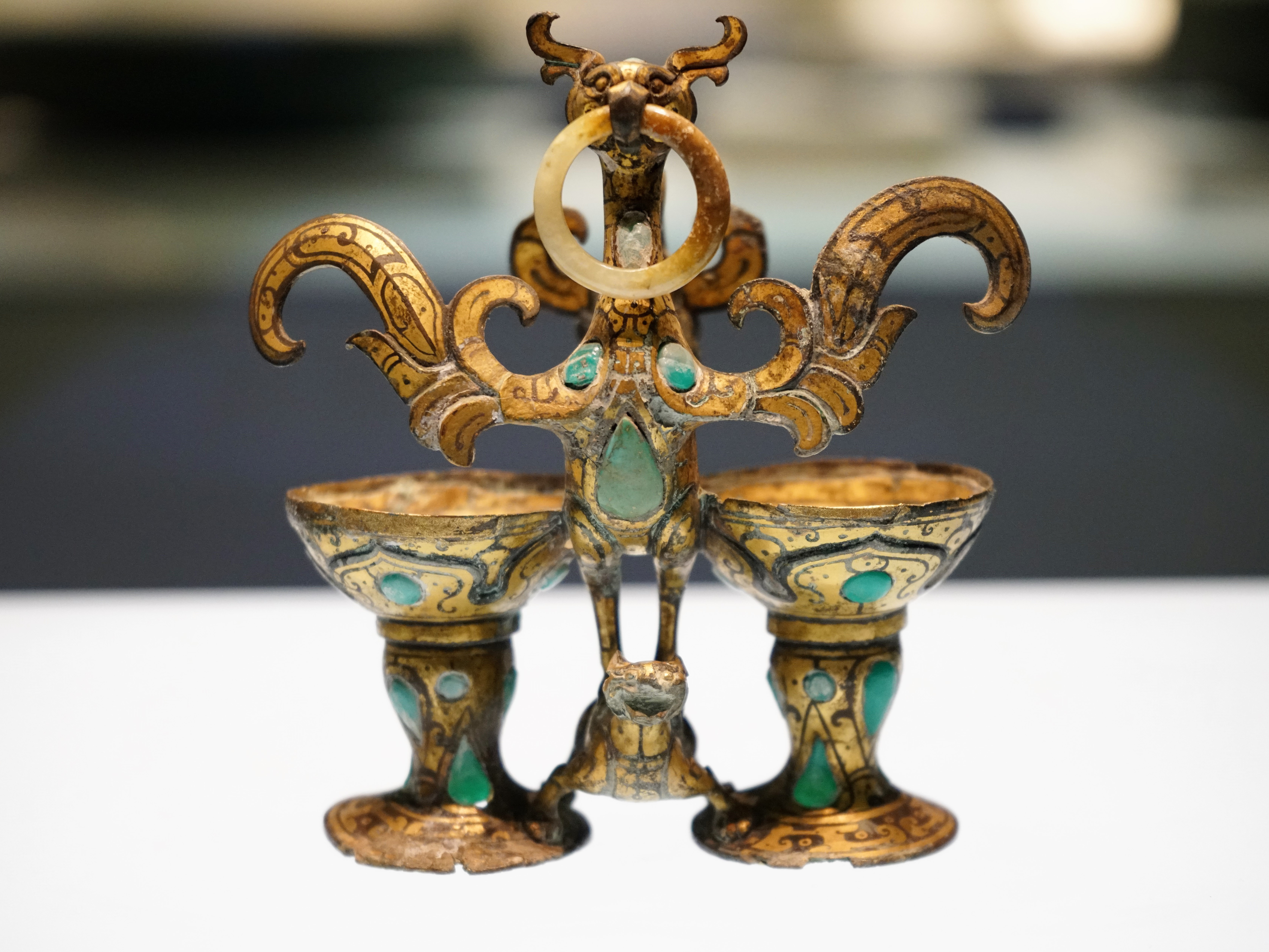
Bronze cups with a vermilion bird holding a jade ring in its mouth, Western Han, from the tomb of Dou Wan

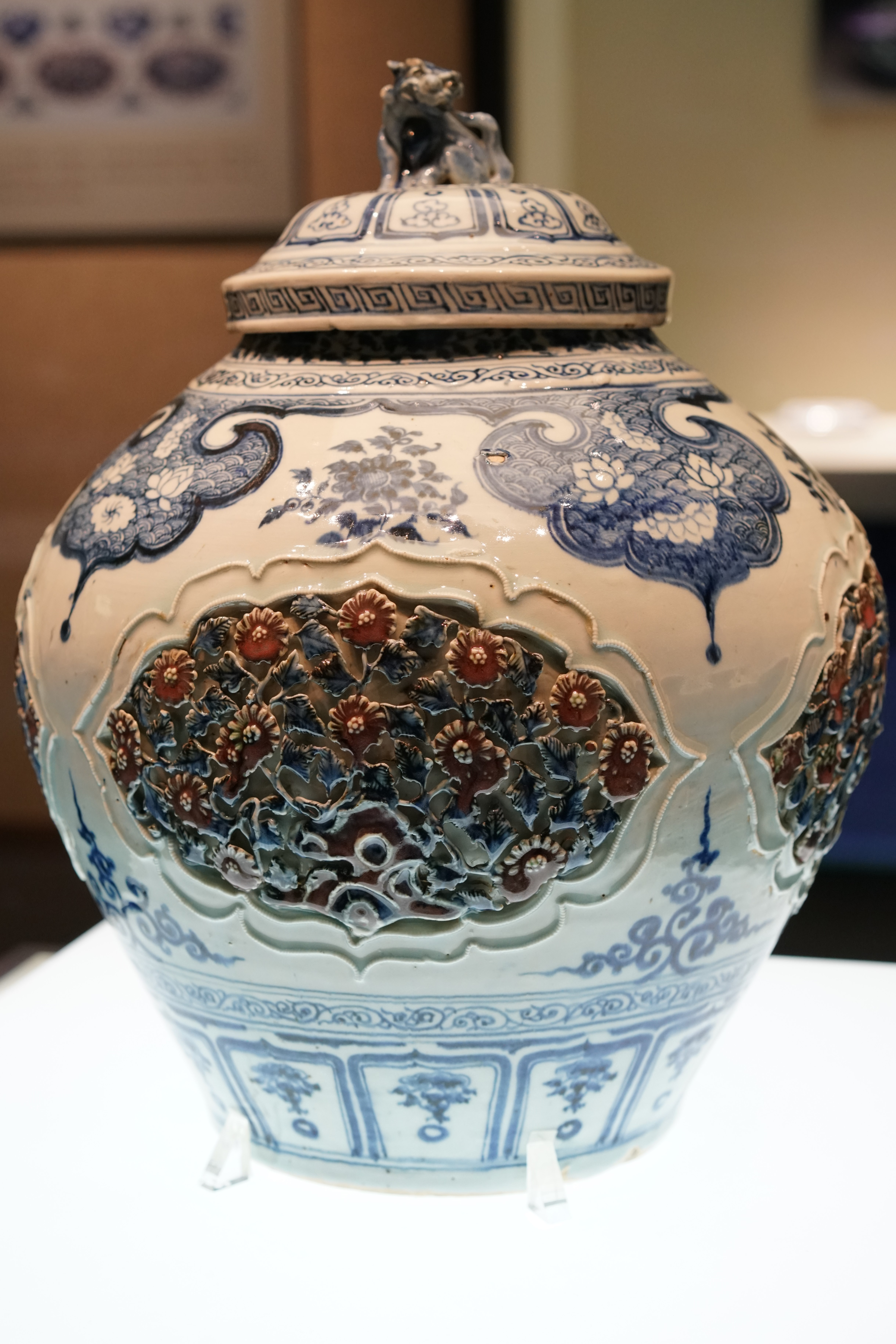
Yuan dynasty blue and white pottery decorated in fretwork floral designs (lotus petals, grasses, and peonies) in blue and red glaze with a lion finial on the lid

== Visitor information ==
Hebei Museum is open Tuesday until Sunday, from 9:00 a.m. to 5:00 p.m. Entrance is free with valid proof of identification.

== See also ==
- List of museums in China
