= Silk painting depicting a man riding a dragon =

Silk painting

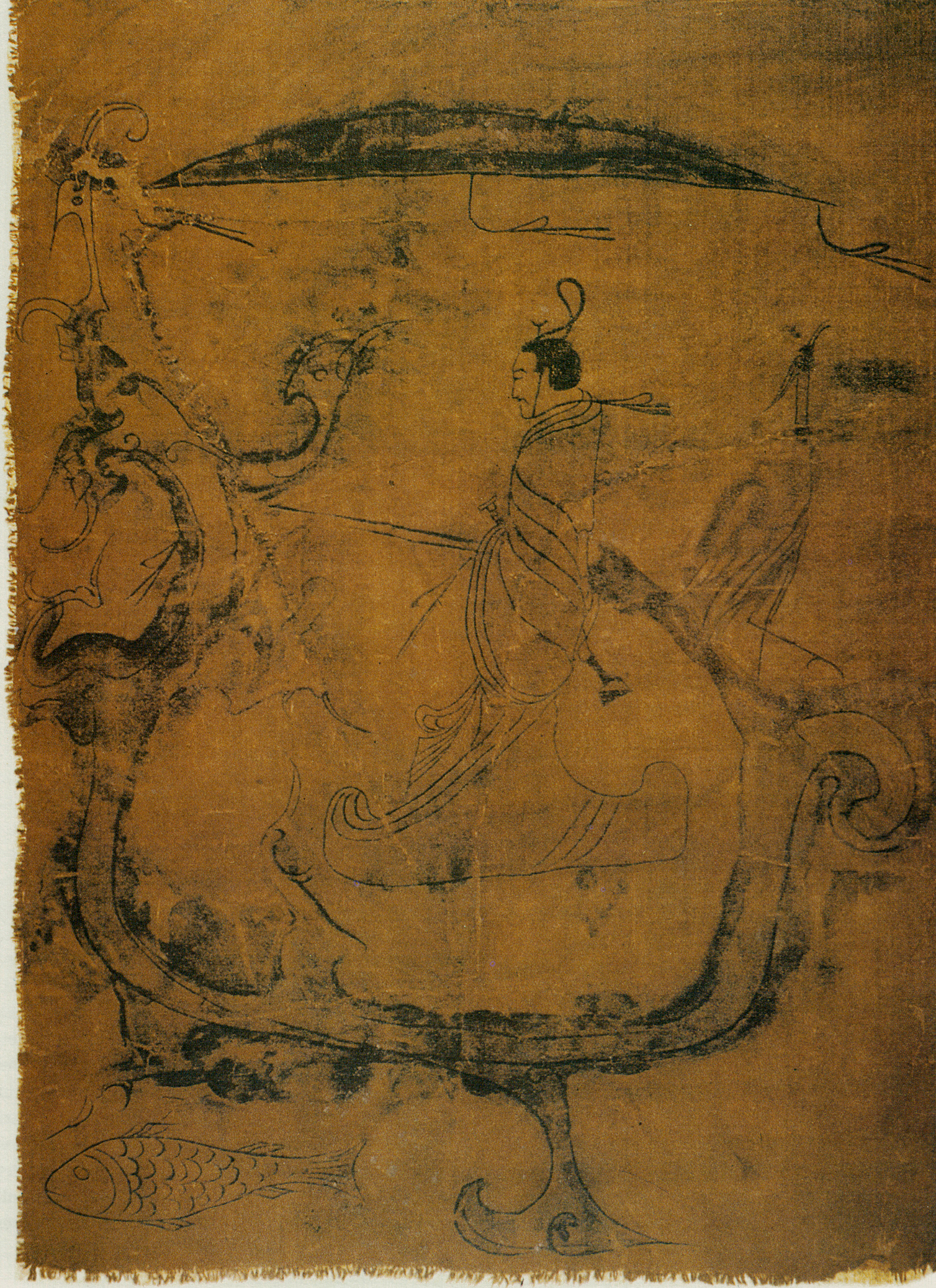
- Silk painting featuring a man riding a dragon, dated to 5th-3rd century BC.
- Type: Silk
- Dimensions: 37.5 cm × 28 cm (14.8 in × 11 in)
- Location: Hunan Museum, Changsha, China

Silk painting depicting a man riding a dragon (人物御龍帛畫) is a Chinese painting on silk from the Warring States period (475-221 BC). It was discovered in the Zidanku Tomb no. 1 in Changsha, Hunan Province in 1973. Now in the Hunan Museum, it is one of the "Chinese cultural relics forbidden to be exhibited abroad", announced by the Chinese government in 2002.

The painting is in a rectangular shape, 37.5 cm in height and 28 cm in width. The silk cloth is dark brown in colour with a flat-line pattern. It is both one of the oldest Chinese paintings and one of the oldest silk paintings in existence.

== Descriptions ==
A man with a sword is riding a dragon by holding the rein. The dragon's body was given the shape of a boat. A little egret is standing at the tail of the dragon. A carp under the dragon is leading the way. The umbrella in the top middle of the picture shows the owner's nobility. The work has become associated with the Chu poet Qu Yuan’s famous verse from his poem Shejiang (涉江, Setting foot in the river), ‘Carrying a long sword with weird colour; Wearing a qieyun–styled high cap.” (帶長鋏之陸離兮, 冠切雲之崔嵬)
