= Qin bronze chariots =

Ancient Chinese bronze chariots

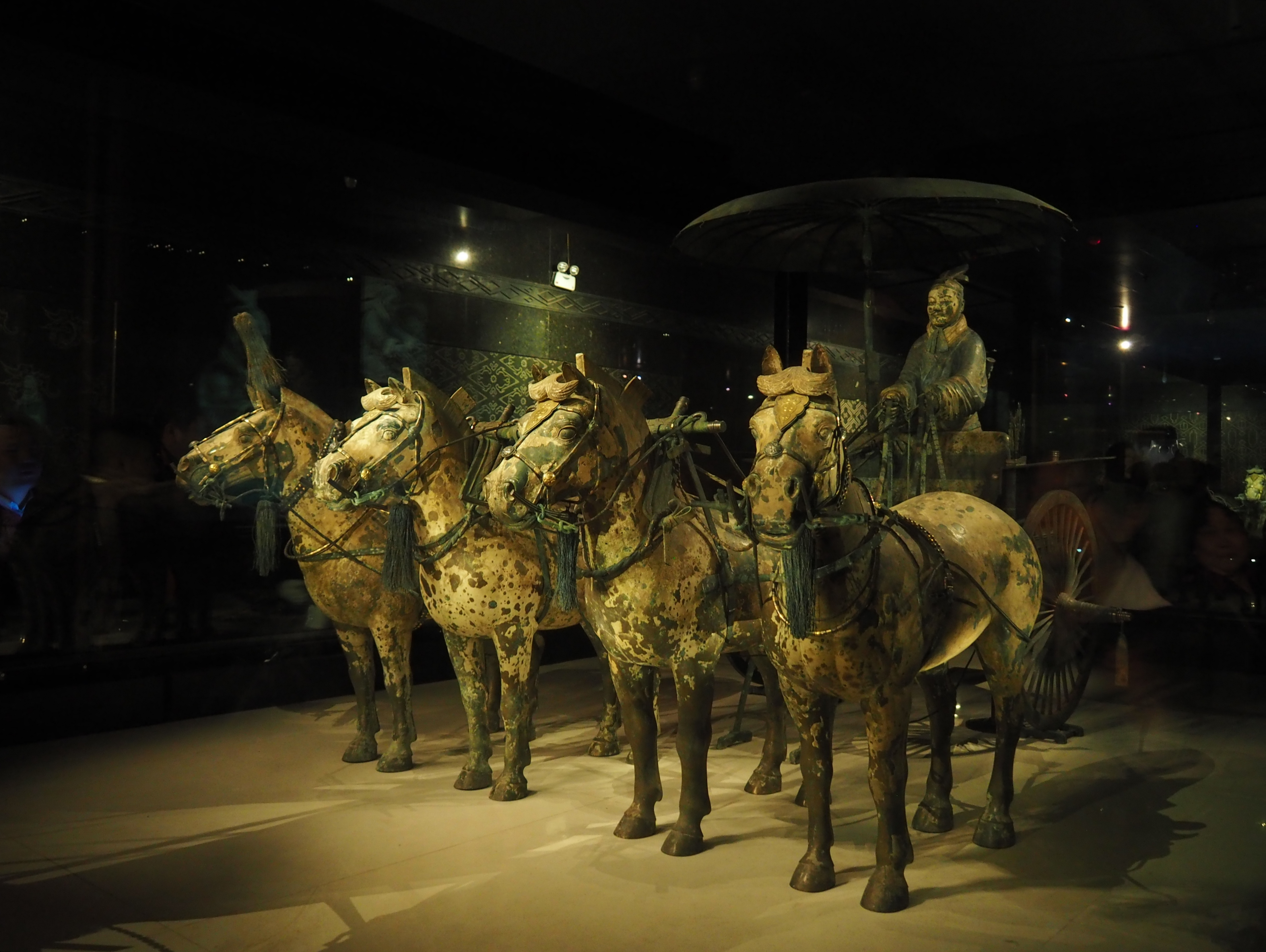
Bronze chariot one

The Qin bronze chariots (銅車馬 or 秦銅車馬) are a set of two Qin dynasty bronze model chariots unearthed in 1980 at the Mausoleum of Qin Shi Huang, who was the first Qin dynasty emperor who reigned from 247 to 220 BCE. Though initially discovered in multiple fragments, the chariots were fully restored after five years, standing as near-half life-size models.

The first piece, bronze chariot number one (一號銅車馬), consists of an open chariot drawn by four bronze horses, and a single standing driver with a nearby stand with a bronze umbrella.

The second piece, bronze chariot number two (二號銅車馬), is a closed carriage drawn by four bronze horses with two seats and a roof resembling an umbrella.

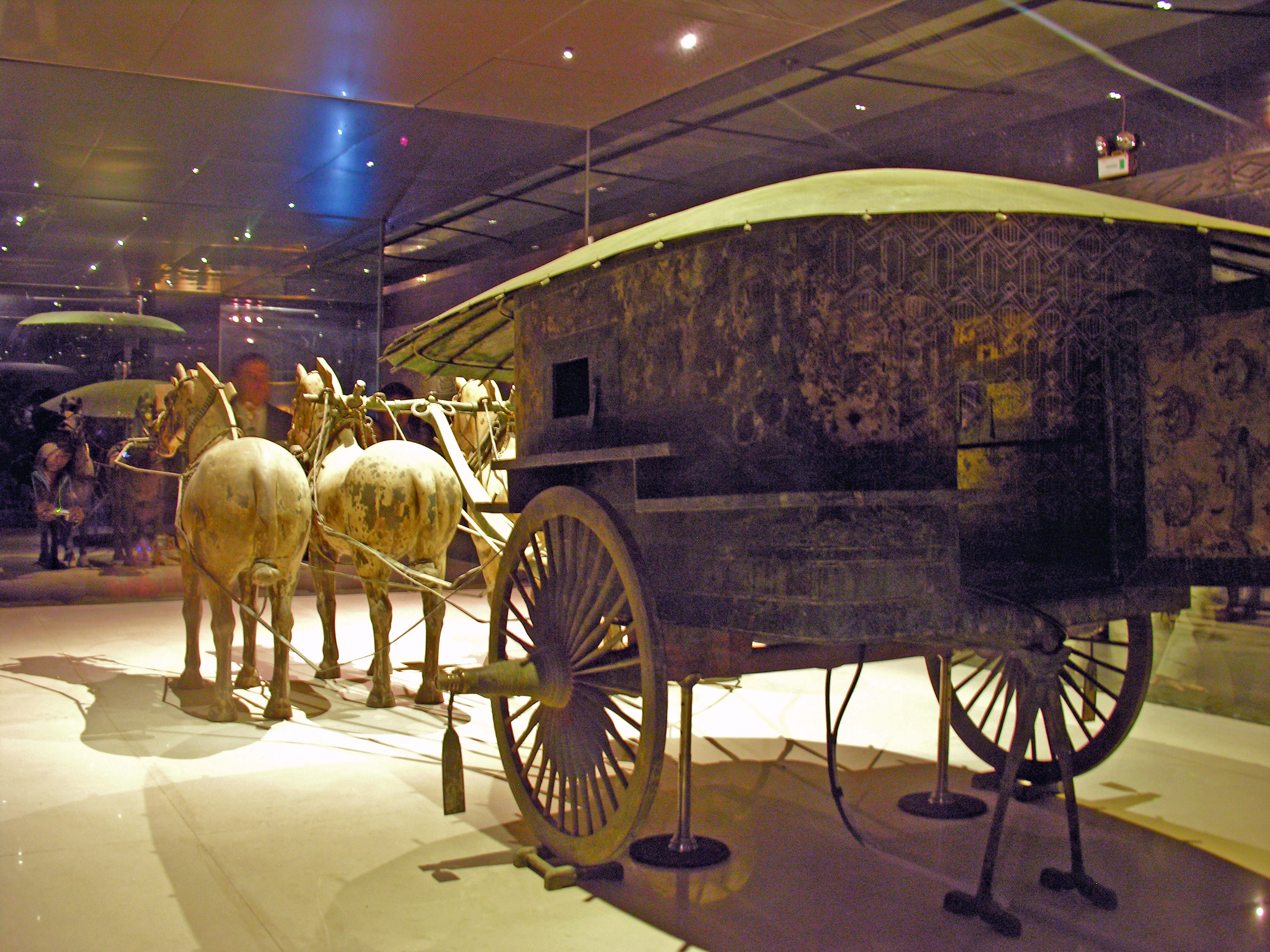
Bronze chariot number two

The chariots are stored at the Museum of the Terracotta Warriors and Horses of Qin Shi Huang (秦始皇兵馬俑博物館) in Shaanxi. In 2010, the piece was showcased at the Shanghai Expo as an exhibit inside the China Pavilion building.

The chariots are Chinese cultural relics forbidden to be exhibited abroad.

== See also ==
- Chariot (Ancient China)
- South-pointing chariot
