= Sanxingdui Museum =

Public heritage museum in Guanghan, Sichuan, China

- 三星堆博物馆
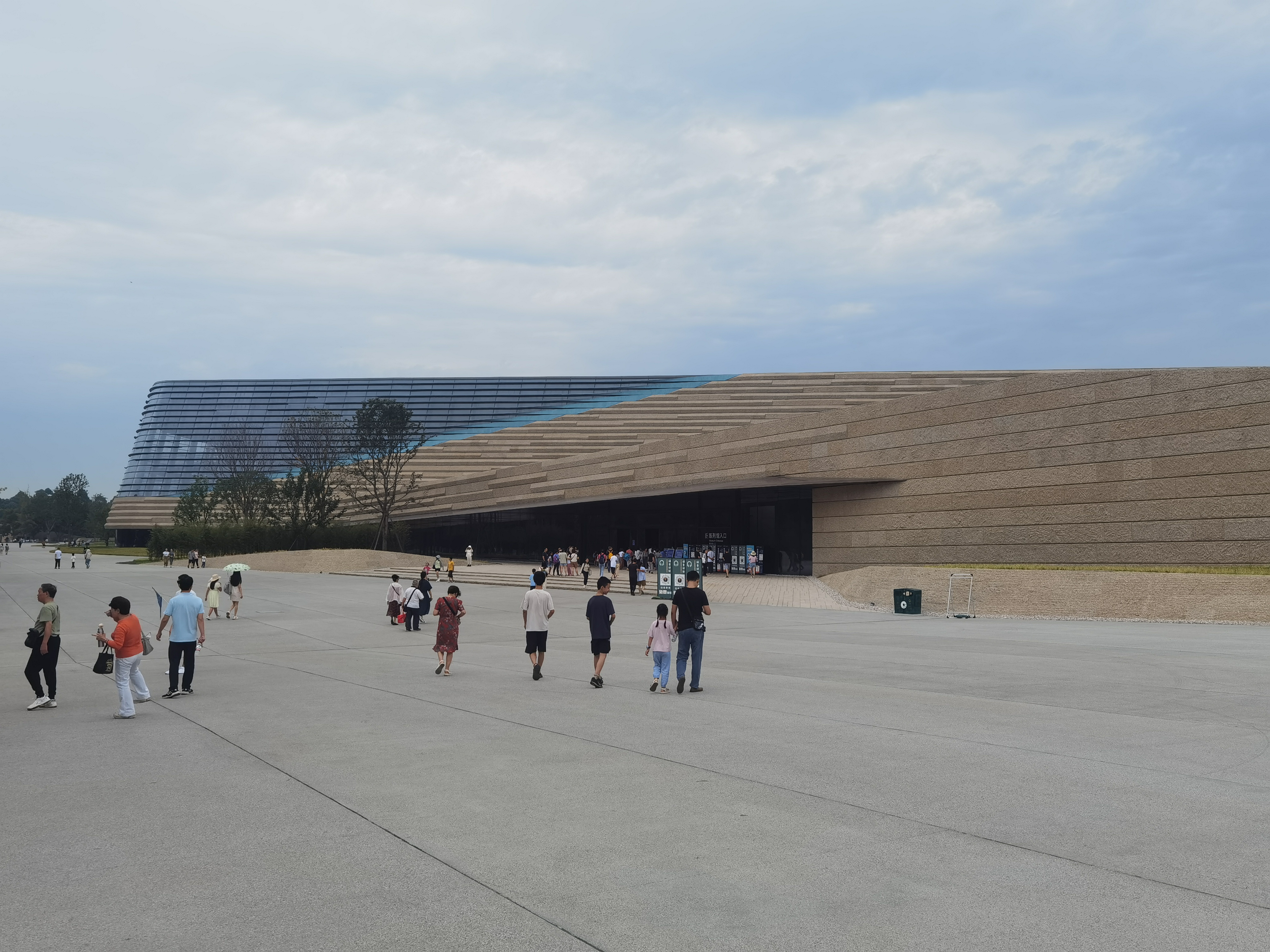

- Location within Sichuan
- Established: 1997
- Location: Guanghan City, Sichuan
- Coordinates: 31.00308°N 104.21814°E
- Website: sxd.cn

The Sanxingdui Museum (三星堆博物馆) is a public heritage museum in Guanghan, Sichuan, China.

The museum is located in the northeast corner of the ruins of Sanxingdui, which is at the bank of Duck River in the west of Guanghan City, Sichuan Province, known as a famous historical and cultural city. It is 38 kilometers north from Chengdu and 26 kilometers south from Deyang. It is a large modern thematic museum. The foundation of the museum was laid in August 1992 and it was formally opened to the public in October 1997.

== Exhibition halls ==
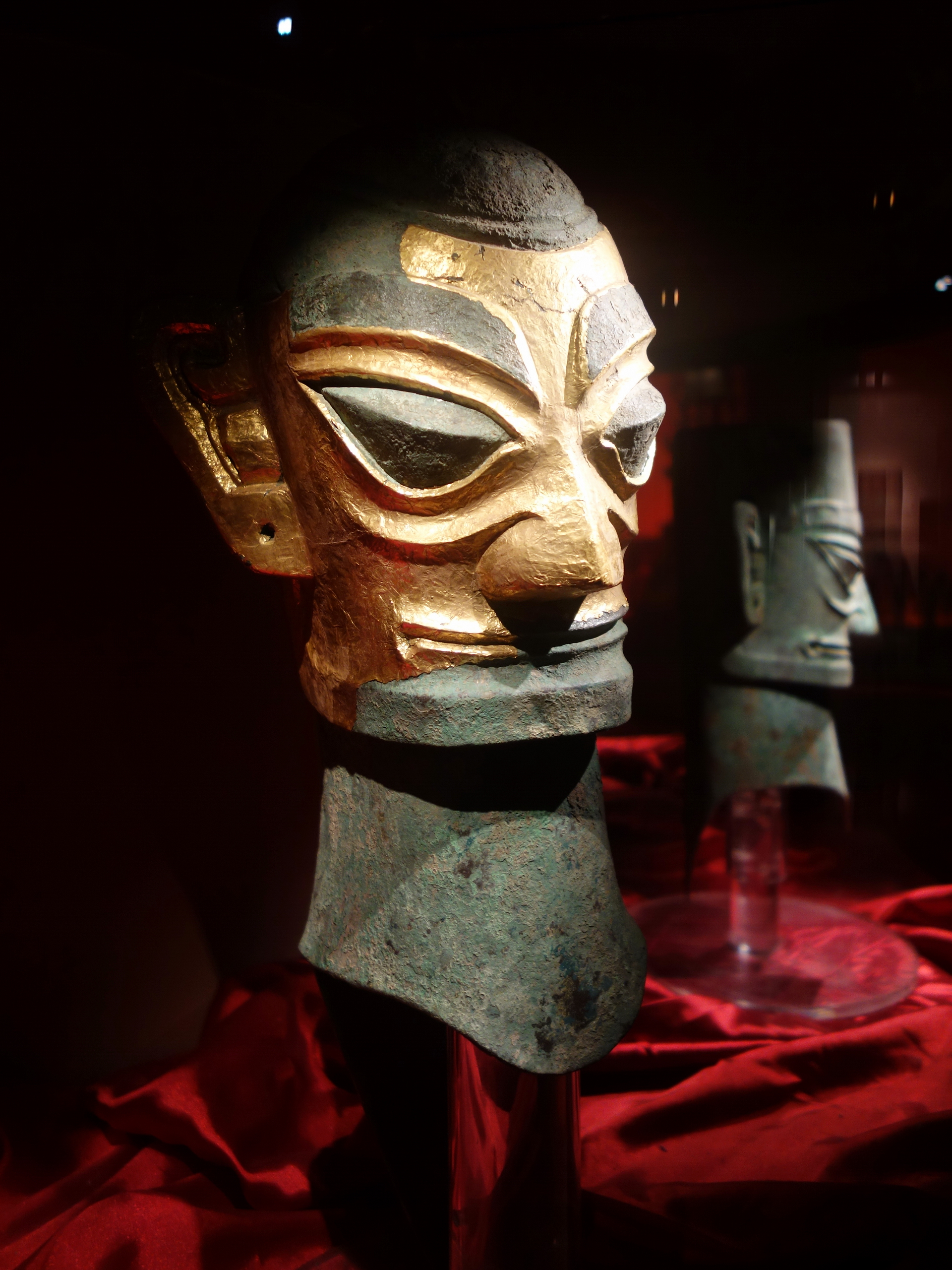
Sanxingdui bronze heads on display

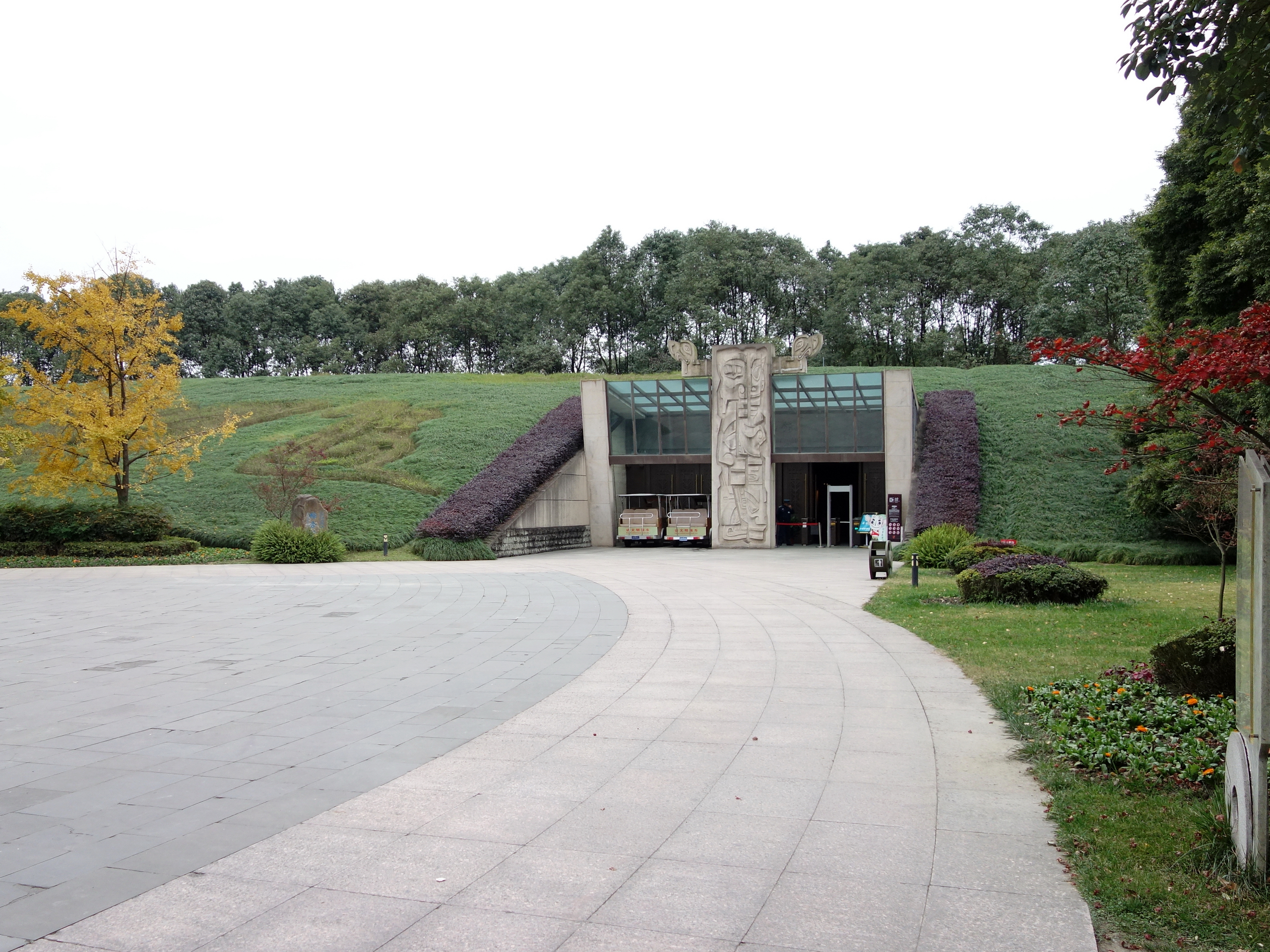
First Pavilion of Sanxingdui Museum

Sanxingdui Museum currently covers an area of about 33 hectares of which the afforested area is over 80%. There are two exhibition halls in the museum, including the First Exhibition Hall and the Second Exhibition Hall. The display area is nearly 12,000 square meters. The First Exhibition Hall exhibits gold, copper, jade, stone, pottery, etc. while the Second Exhibition Hall is specially used to exhibit bronze.

According to the South China Morning Post, Sanxingdui Museum opened a new building in 2023, displaying nearly 600 relics for the first time, with its preliminary opening in July 2023. A total of more than 1,500 pieces or sets of relics, including pottery, bronze, jade and gold wares are showcased in the new building.

== Influence ==
In 2019 the museum received almost 964,000 visitors and earned revenue of nearly 40 million yuan.

== See also ==
- List of museums in China
