= Maoling Museum =

Museum in Shaanxi Province, China

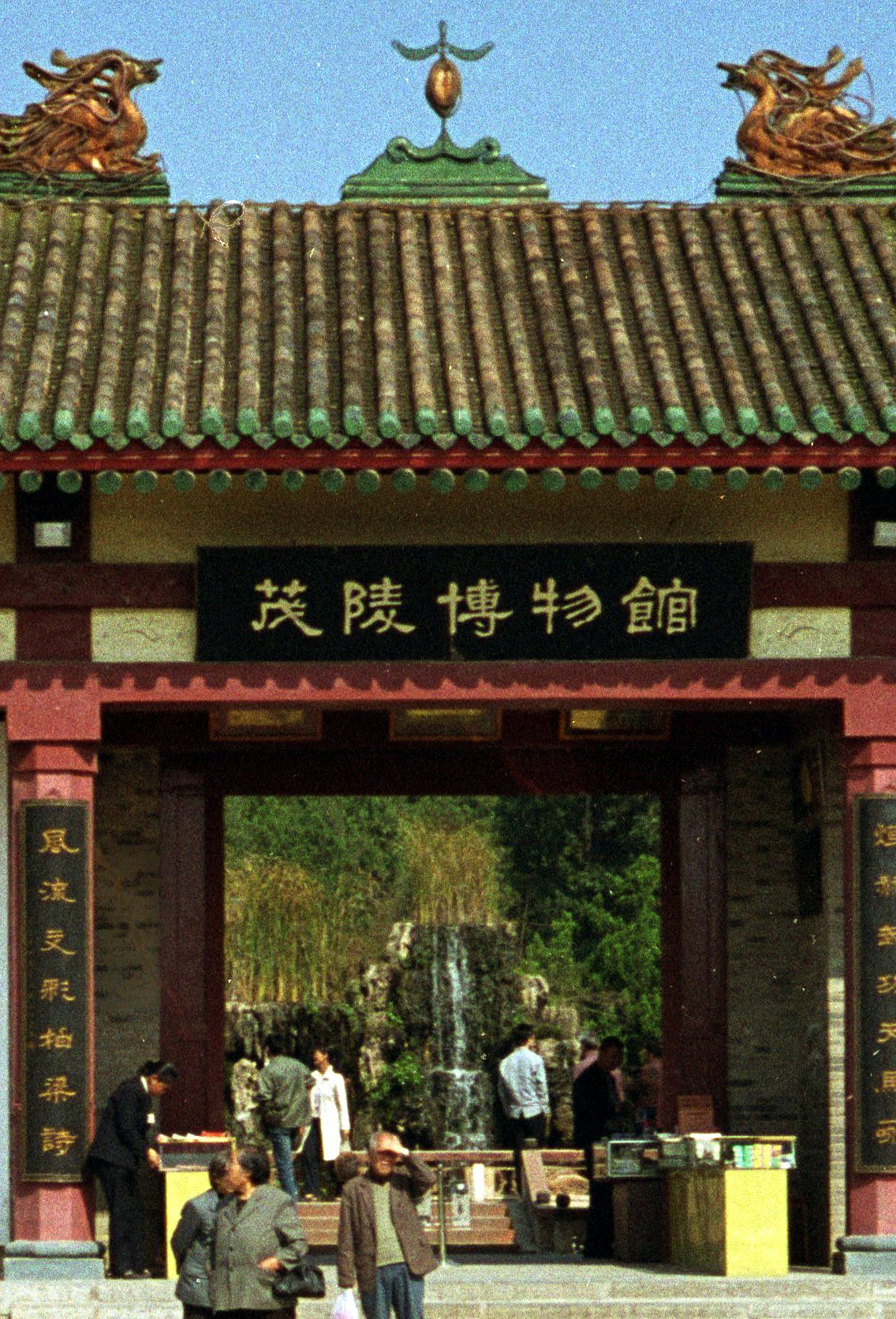
- Established: December 1979
- Location: East side of Maoling Tomb of Emperor Wu of Han, Nanwei Town, Xingping, Xianyang, Shaanxi, China
- Coordinates: 34.3406°N 108.5815°E
- Type: archaeological museum
- Collection size: 4100
- Website: maoling.com

Maoling Museum is a museum located in Xingping in Shaanxi Province, China. It features artefacts related to Han Dynasty Emperor Maoling, Huo Zaodi Tomb and a large group of stone carvings. The museum was formerly established in 1956 for the Maoling cultural relics depository, and was designated as a museum in December 1979. The museum covers an area of 492,000 square meters, building area of 16,159 square meters, the collection of cultural relics more than 4,100 pieces, for the institutions, under the Xingping City Culture and Tourism Bureau.

== History ==
The museum is named after the Maoling Mausoleum, the mausoleum of Liu Che, Emperor Wu Di of Han Dynasty, the emperor of Western Han Dynasty, which is the largest among the tombs of the Western Han emperors and is surrounded by more than 20 tombs of Madame Li, Emperor Wu Di of Han Dynasty, Wei Qing, and Huo Guang, etc. The tomb of Huo Zaiwei, buried on the east side of the Maoling Mausoleum, is the tomb of Huo Qubing, the Champion Marquis of the Western Han Dynasty, who was a general of the Western Han's Grand Secretary Hussar. The Maoling Mausoleum was an important monument in ancient China, but the original magnificent and luxurious ground architecture has long since disappeared in the course of history. In the 41st year of the Qianlong reign (1776) of the Qing Dynasty, Bi Yuan, the governor of Shaanxi Province, and Gu Shenglei, the governor of Xingping County, erected a monument for the Maoling Mausoleum and the tomb of Huo Zaoyi. However, on the whole, the protection of the Maoling Tomb and the surrounding monuments was not satisfactory, and was regarded as a wild mound of ruins, with farmers cultivating the land from time to time nibbling away at and destroying the cemetery. The stone carvings in front of the tomb were also abandoned in the wilderness for many years, sunk in the soil, and even taken as private property or thrown and smashed.

In 1931, the National Government planned to make Xi'an the capital of the country and set up the "Xi'an Preparatory Committee" in the city. Zhang Ji, the head of the Preparatory Committee, attached great importance to monuments, cultural relics and cultural education, and therefore, from 1933 to 1934, he built elementary school in the vicinity of Xi'an in order to develop cultural education in rural areas and cultivate students' sense of national pride, and at the same time, took the opportunity of building the schools to protect the cultural relics and scenic spots and monuments. Among them, the Maoling Elementary School (now Maoling Junior High School) was established in the north of Huo Zaodong Tomb in Maoling East, Xingping County. After the establishment of Maoling Primary School, in the school attached to the "Maoling Office", Hu Jiping for the director, by the management of cultural relics and stone carvings. And the Huo Tomb south of the east and west sides each built a tile room, three walls, east and west of the opposite side, no wall, the Huo Tomb around the top and bottom of the more than 10 pieces of stone carvings scattered around, moved inside, called "Ancient Warehouse" for Chinese and foreign tourists to enjoy. In addition, Zhang Ji also constructed from Xi'an Tumenzi to the Han Weiyang Palace, Xianyang Zhou Wenwang Mausoleum, Xingping Maoling, Liquan Zhaoling and other places of the highway, so that the Nanjing National Government to send people to Xi'an every year for the Ching Ming Festival to pay homage to the tomb.

After the founding of the People's Republic of China in 1949, the local people's government on the Huo Zaiwei tomb in front of a few broken stone carving gallery room refurbishment. 1956, the establishment of maoling cultural relics custodian, only large stone carvings of 9 pieces, there is no any collection of cultural relics. 1961 March, maoling, Huo Zaiwei tomb was announced by the State Council as the first batch of national key cultural relics protection units. Maoling cultural management covers an area of 3600 square meters, stone carving gallery room 20 (240 square meters), the door room and a half, cultural relics only 16 pieces of large stone carvings, set up a manager to look after. Subsequently, maoling cultural management of the area and building year by year expansion, personnel also gradually increased. Through the excavation of scattered cultural relics, encourage the masses around the maoling to hand over cultural relics, etc., maoling cultural relics collection also gradually increased.

In December 1979, maoling cultural management promoted to maoling museum. In order to prevent the loss of cultural relics, the museum organizes and mobilizes the surrounding masses, and establishes cultural relics protection organizations near the Maoling Mausoleum, relying on the masses to protect cultural relics and forming a mass cultural relics protection network. In May 2009, China's State Administration of Cultural Heritage released the list of the first batch of national second-class museums, which was listed in the museum.

== Collections ==
Maoling Museum has more than 4,000 kinds of cultural relics, the museum displays 16 large stone carvings of the Western Han Dynasty, divided into "Horse Treading on Xiongnu", "Leaping Horses", "Monster Eating Sheep", "tiger", 'frog' and so on. There is also a collection of cultural relics unearthed near the Maoling Mausoleum, including gilt-bronze horses, Qin and Han portrait bricks, and textual wadangs, etc. As of 2020, the museum has a collection of more than 4,100 cultural relics in the categories of gold, silver, copper, iron, jade, stone, wadang, and pottery, of which stone carvings of Fuhu, excavated artifacts of gilt horses, jade carvings of pavements, hollow bricks of the four deities, and ceramic water tubes have been exhibited outside the country for many times.

The museum's collection of cultural relics mainly comes from the general villagers around Maoling, purely unearthed within the Maoling area. In October 1980, Zhang Gugu, a villager from Qijiapo, Xiwu Township, Xingping County, found cultural relics while digging in his own manor base, and the Maoling Museum subsequently cleared out 33 cultural relics of 15 kinds, including Western Han bronze tripods, bronze franciums, bronze mirrors, and five-baht coins.In 1981, Jiang Huijie, a villager from Dongchenqian, Nanbit Township, Xingping County, discovered ancient grave sites while digging kilns at home, and cleaned up the site. In May 1981, Xingping County, Xiwu Township, Douma Village villagers Gao Juntian, etc. in the Maoling burial area Yang Xin tomb south of the gilt bronze horse was found when leveling the land and immediately reported to the Maoling Museum, and later excavated and cleaned up a total of 236 pieces of cultural relics unearthed. To 1989, maoling museum collected more than 3100 pieces of cultural relics handed over by the masses.

== Pavilion Exhibition ==
The Maoling Museum, built in front of the tomb of Huo Zaiwei, is a garden-style museum with pavilions and pavilions built in imitation style. The museum covers an area of 121,486 square meters, with a building area of 15,805 square meters.

At the forefront of the Maoling Museum is the main gate, with two buildings of showrooms on the east and west sides of the compound, and slightly ahead are the East Court and West Court. The East Court is set up with a guesthouse and restaurant, and the West Court has a reception room. Huo Tomb is located in the museum garden, there are two corner towers and a pair of stone-carved pavilions in front of the tomb, four stone-carved corridors on both sides, and a stone monument erected in the center in front of the tomb. On the south side of the tomb, there are curved rails on both sides leading to the top of the tomb, and there is a "Pavilion of Excellency" at the top of the tomb. Inside the pavilion, there are various gardens of various sizes fenced with holly, interspersed with more than a hundred kinds of flowers and trees.

== Visiting ==
The Maoling Museum is open for tours from April to October from 8:30 to 18:00 every day, and from November to March from 8:30 to 17:30 every day.You need to log on the official website of the Maoling Museum to purchase tickets by using the ID card real-name online reservation system, and the ticket price is 75 yuan per person in the peak season (March to November) and 55 yuan per person in the off-season (December to the end of February). Visitors can take the No. 4 bus to Fujiaqiao and transfer to the No. 11 bus to reach the Maoling Museum in Xianyang City.
