= Yangzhou Museum =

Museum in Yangzhou, China

Coordinates: 32°23′34″N 119°21′59″E

Yangzhou Museum 扬州博物馆
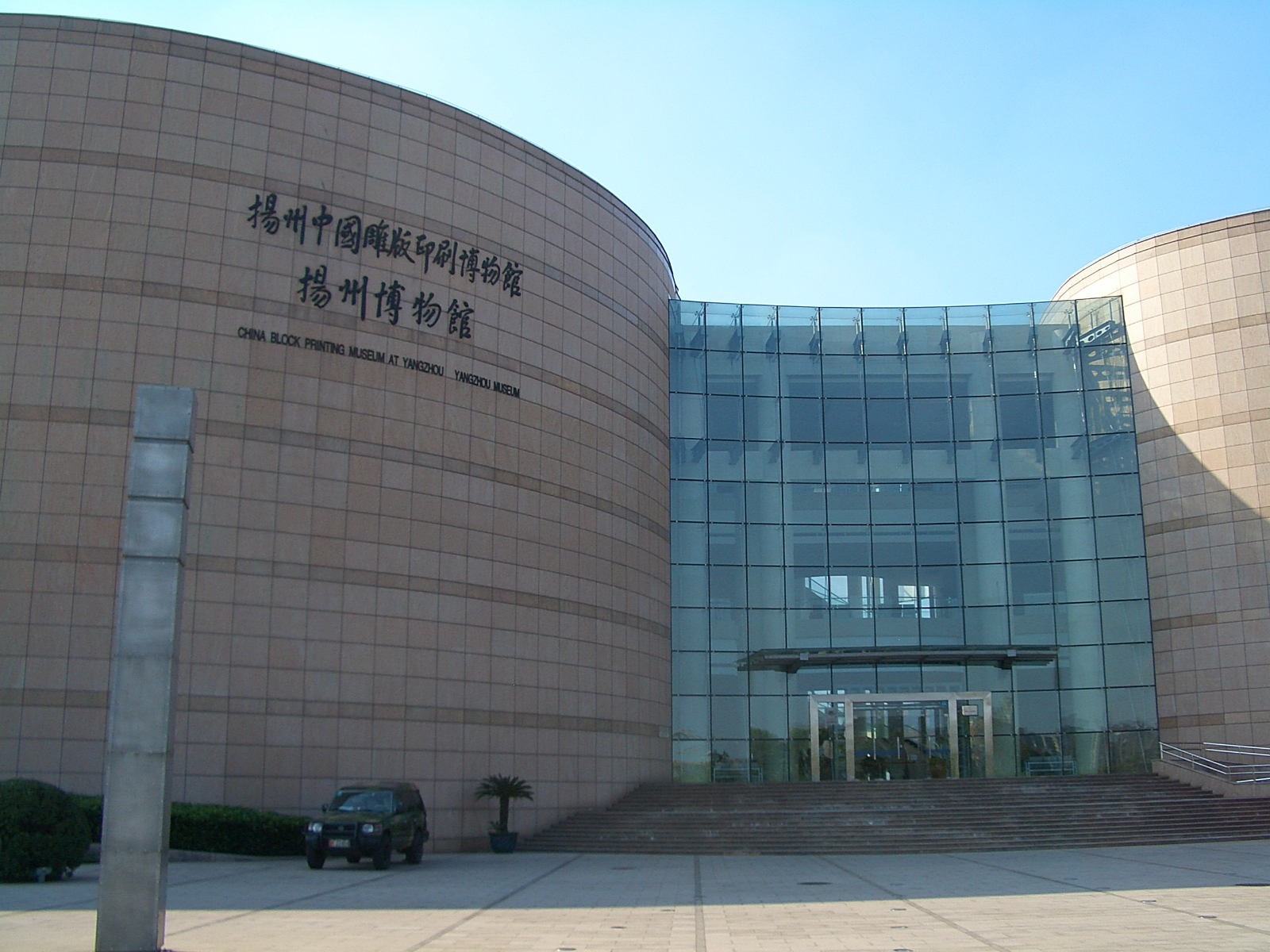
- Established: 2005
- Location: Hanjiang District, Yangzhou, People's Republic of China
- Website: www.yzmuseum.com

Building details

Technical details
- Floor area: 50,000 m^{2} (540,000 sq ft)

Yangzhou Museum (simplified Chinese: 扬州博物馆; traditional Chinese: 揚州博物館; pinyin: Yángzhōu Bówùguǎn) is the biggest museum in Yangzhou, an ancient city in Jiangsu Province of China. It is located in front of the Mingyue Lake ("Bright Moon Lake") on West Wenchang Road, about 4 km west of downtown Yangzhou and Slender West Lake.

Yangzhou Museum is housed in a modern building, covering an area of 50,000 m^{2} (540,000 sq ft). It shares its lobby with the adjacent China Block Printing Museum; together the two museums are commonly known as the Yangzhou Double Museum (扬州双博馆).

== History ==
The museum was formerly located in the 1500-year-old Tianning Temple. The museum has had a number of different homes in its history; recently, the museum moved to a new building to accommodate its growing collections.

== Exhibition halls ==
The museum has seven exhibition halls, including Yangzhou history exhibition hall, Ancient Chinese sculpture art museum, Paintings and calligraphy of Yangzhou eight strange men hall, Collection of dynasty paintings and calligraphy in Ming dynasty and Qing dynasty hall, China national treasure hall, Jianyang printing museum and Yangzhou jianyang printing hall. Exhibits date from the Neolithic age down to late Qing dynasty. It features in the relics of Han dynasty, Tang dynasty, Ming dynasty and Qing dynasty.

== Exhibitions ==
- Ancient Chinese Earthenware
- Ancient Chinese Jade
- Ancient Chinese Calligraphy & Painting
- Bronze Ware
- Cultural Relics
- Yangzhou Paper-cut Art
- Ming and Qing Porcelain

== Gallery ==
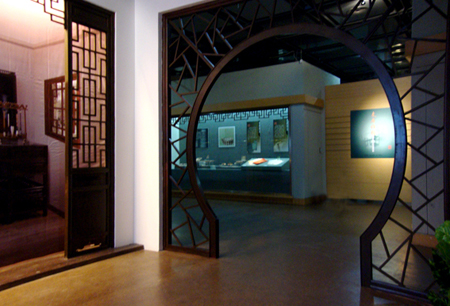
Yangzhou museum inside

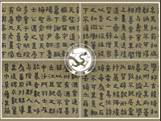
Calligraphy001

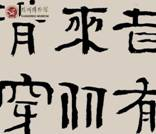
Calligraphy in ancient China
