= Dou Wan =

Ancient Chinese noblewoman

Dou Wan (Chinese: 竇綰; pinyin: Dòu Wǎn) was a Chinese noblewoman of the Western Han dynasty who was married to Liu Sheng, Prince of Zhongshan, a brother of Emperor Wu of Han. Her tomb was discovered in Mancheng County, and many of her burial goods, including her jade burial suit, have been declared national treasures.

== Biography ==
Dou Wan was the wife of Liu Sheng, who, after the Rebellion of the Seven States in 154 BCE, established Zhongshan in the former territory of the rebellious Zhao Kingdom. The date of her death is thought to have been between 118 and 104 BCE, and it remains a point of debate as to whether she died before her husband or after him.

== Tomb ==
Dou Wan's burial is one of few Han elite burials that have not been robbed. The wealth represented by her and Liu Sheng's tombs was unprecedented when it was excavated, with Dou Wan's burial alone containing a total of 5,124 artefacts, including jade, silk, lacquer, and bronze.

=== Location ===
The tomb of Dou Wan is located on the eastern slope of a hill known locally as Lingshan (Chinese: 陵山), which lies to the south-west of the Mancheng County seat in Hubei Province, to the east of the Taihang Mountains. In the Western Han, this area was part of Beiping County (Chinese: 北平县) in the north of Zhongshan State. Dou Wan's tomb is located approximately 120 m north of her husband's, and 18 other members of Liu Sheng's family were buried on Lingshan's southern slope.

=== Discovery ===
Archaeologists excavated the tomb of Liu Sheng in 1968. When finishing the excavation, they noticed signs of stone cutting on a hill several hundred metres to the north. Test excavations revealed the presence of another large tomb and full excavations were conducted from August to September 1968.

=== Tomb structure ===
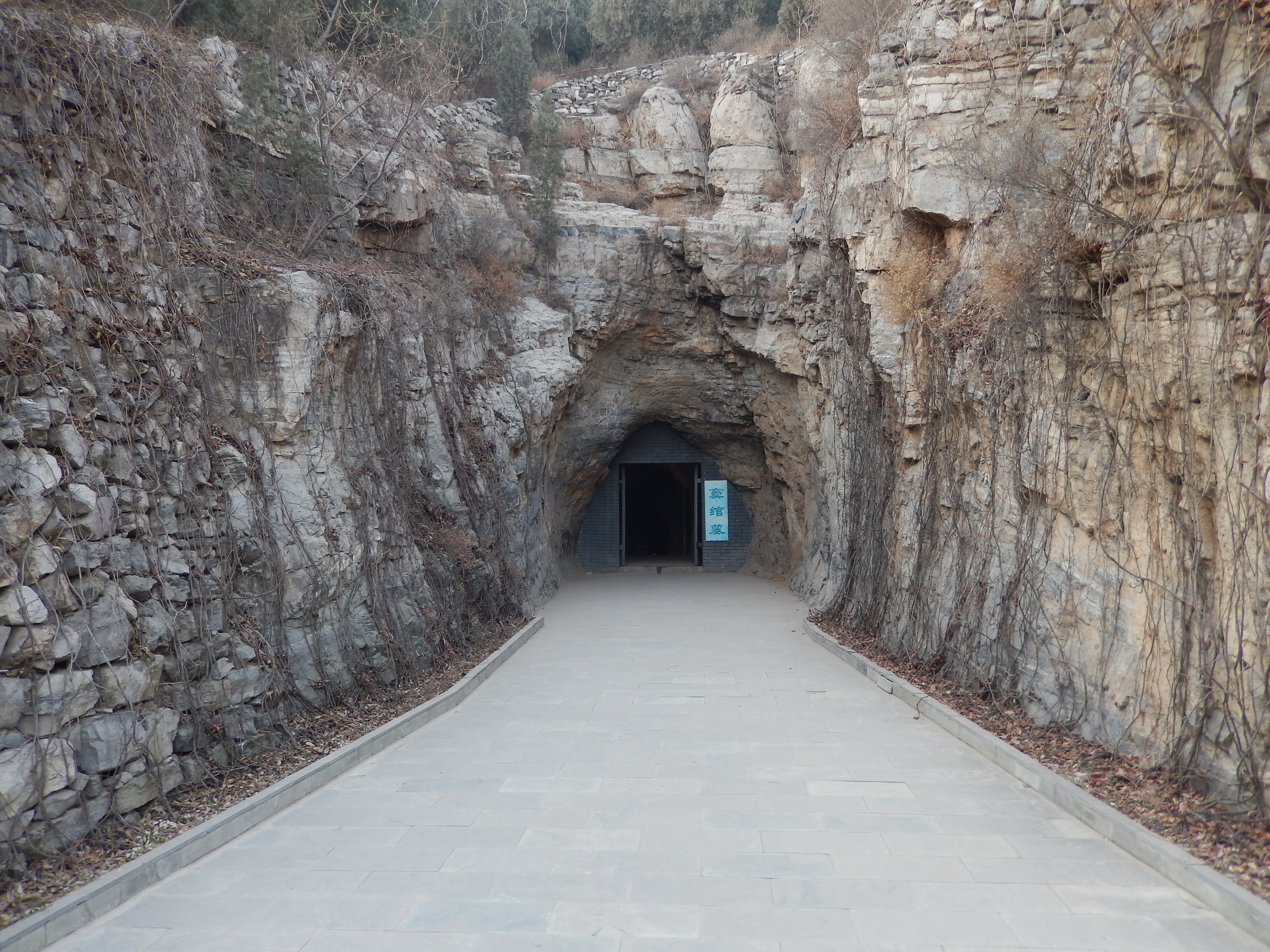
Entrance to the tomb of Dou Wan

Dou Wan was buried separately from her husband but their two tombs together form a pair. A 6–14 m wide stone-cut path links the entrance to Dou Wan's tomb with her husband's.

=== Burial goods ===
Dou Wan's body was encased in a jade burial suit constructed from 2,160 pieces of jade stitched together with gold thread. The suit was intricately constructed to fit her body, and the head part is shaped to represent eyes, ears, a nose, and a mouth.

Hers and her husband's were the first jade burial suits to be discovered by archaeologists. These burial suits were made to protect the people from the flesh-soul. The common belief of this period was that every human being owned two souls: a flesh-soul and a breath-soul. The breath-soul escapes after the death of a person, but the flesh-soul remains in the body for a period of about a year. The flesh soul was supposed to be very malignant, so the wealthy were plated in jade suits to prevent it from escaping the body.

Inside a back chamber of the grave, a house-like construction was found, built to imitate the outside world. Amongst the inventory there was also a number of sexual tools.

Changxin Palace Lantern – a lamp with an adjustable sliding shutter, dated 173 BCE.

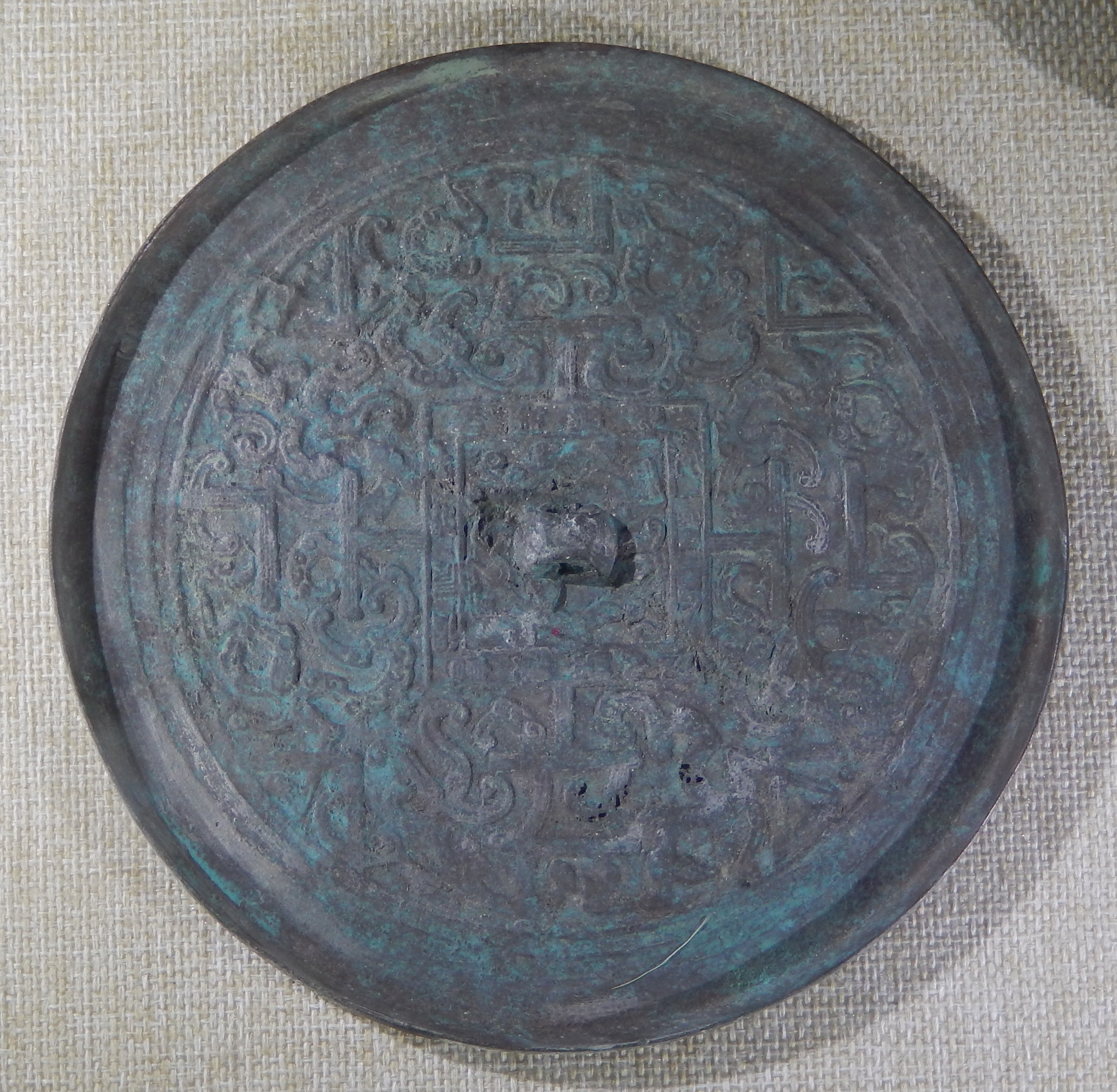
Bronze mirror

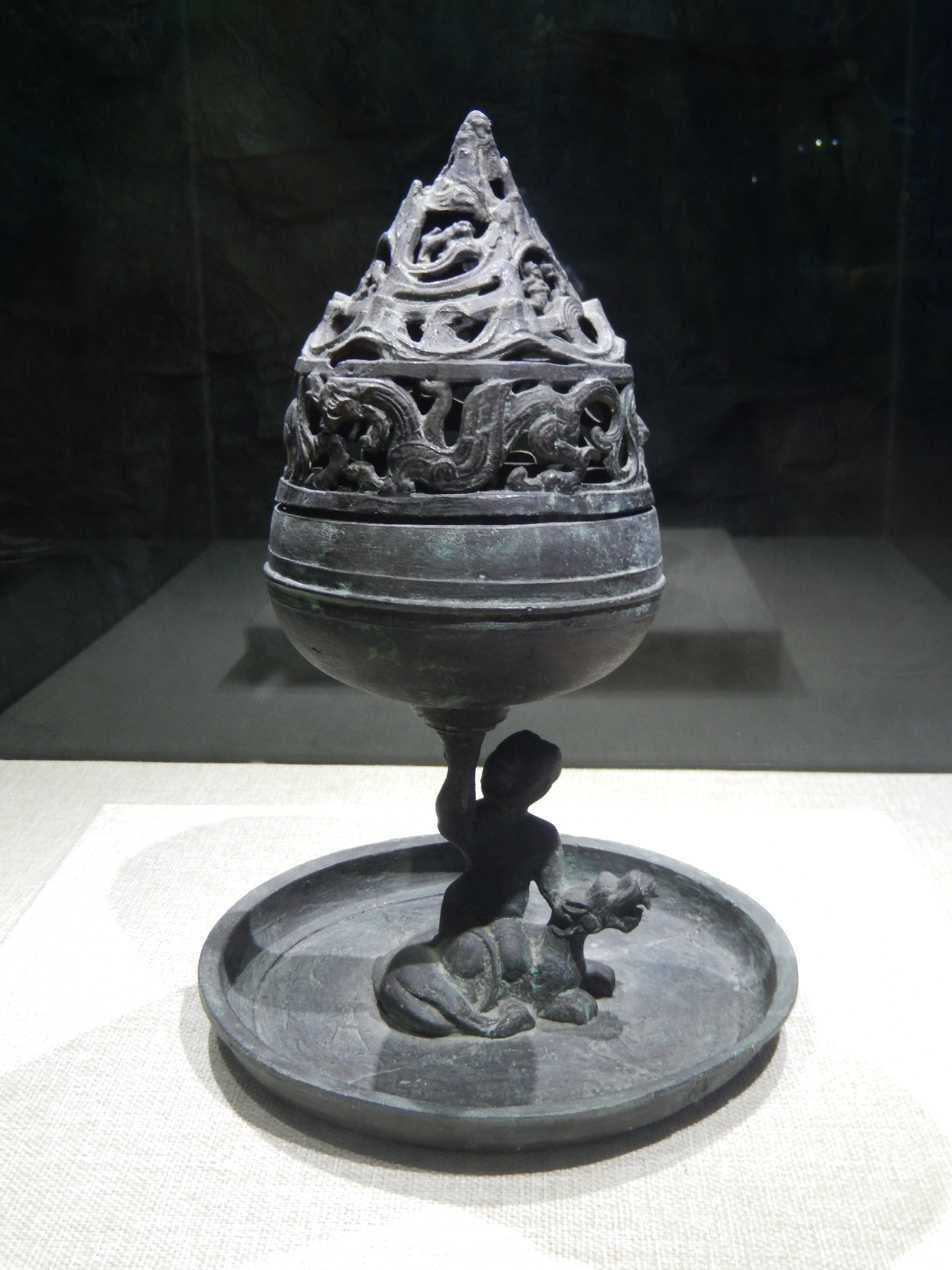
Bronze incense burner

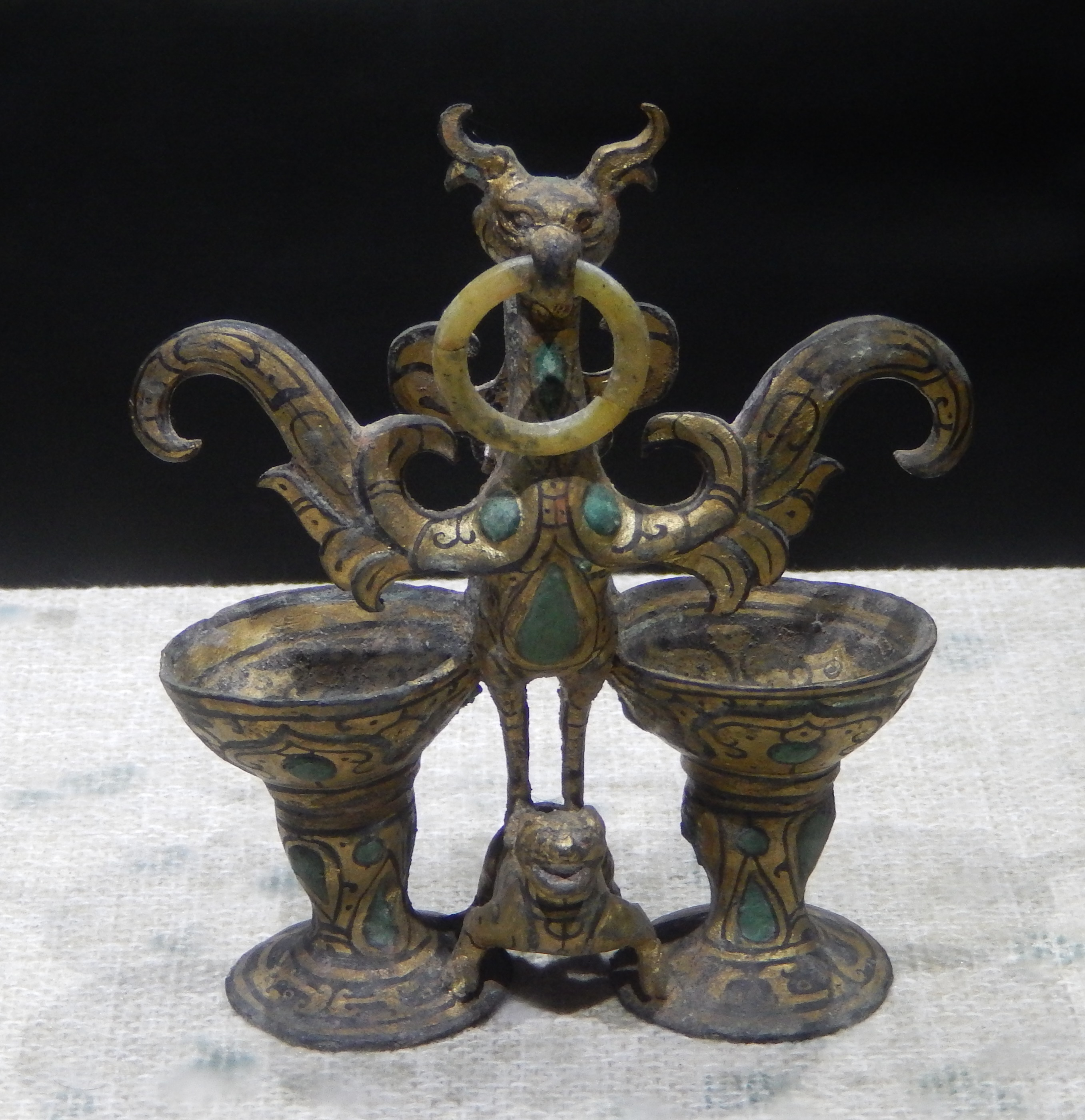
Bronze bird with ring in its beak and two cups

== Sources ==
- Institute of Archaeology of the Chinese Academy of Social Sciences; Hebei Provincial Cultural Relics Management Office, eds. (1980). 满城汉墓发掘报告 上 [Excavation report of the Han tombs at Mancheng, vol. 1] (in Chinese). Beijing: Wenwu chubanshe.
- Lu (卢), Zhaomeng (兆荫) (2018). "满城汉墓玉器与汉玉新风格" [Jades from the Mancheng Han tombs and the new style of Han jade]. Shoucangjia 收藏家 (in Chinese) (3): 25–28.
- Shi, Jie (2017). The Mancheng tomb: shaping the afterlife of the "kingdom within mountains" (Zhongshan) in Western Han China (206 BCE–8 CE) (PhD). University of Chicago.
