= Baoji Bronzeware Museum =

Baoji Bronze Ware Museum
- 宝鸡青铜器博物院
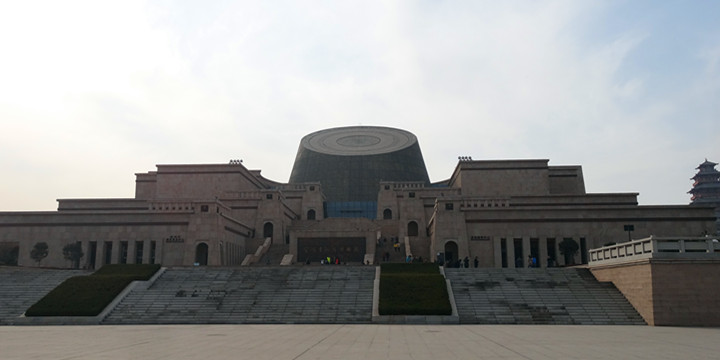

- Location in Shaanxi.
- Former name: Baoji Historical Relics Exhibition Hall
- Established: 1956
- Location: Baoji, Shaanxi, China
- Coordinates: 34°21′13″N 107°12′01″E
- Type: Archaeology museum
- Key holdings: Bronze ware
- Collections: 120,000
- Founder: Baoji Municipal Government
- President: Chen Liang (陈亮)
- Website: www.bjqtm.com

Baoji Bronzeware Museum
- Traditional Chinese: 寶雞青銅器博物院
- Simplified Chinese: 宝鸡青铜器博物院
Transcriptions
Standard Mandarin
- Hanyu Pinyin: Bǎojī Qīngtóngqì Bówùyuàn

The Baoji Bronzeware Museum (Chinese: 宝鸡青铜器博物院) is an archaeology museum in Baoji, Shaanxi, China. It has a collection of more than 120,000 pieces of cultural relics through the ages, most of them are Zhou dynasty bronze wares. Baoji Bronze Ware Museum's present building, which opened in 2010, occupies an area of more than 50,800 square metres (547,000 sq ft), with a total floor space of 34,788 square metres (374,450 sq ft).

Several Zhou dynasty sites have been excavated within the Baoji region.

== History ==
The museum was first constructed in 1956 as the Baoji Historical Relics Exhibition Hall (宝鸡历史文物陈列室). It was renowned for its bronze wares, . In 1958, it was renamed as the Baoji Museum (宝鸡市博物馆). At that time, it had a collection of more than 110,000 objects, including 5,740 bronze wares.

In 1990, the construction of its new building began and the museum was completed in 1998, and opened to the public on September 8, 1998 as the Baoji Bronzeware Museum.

In 2006, the construction of the present building began and the museum was completed on September 28, 2010.

== Gallery ==
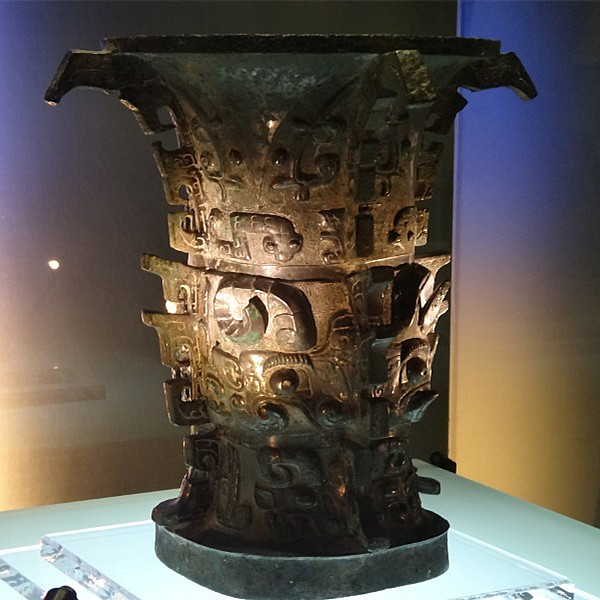
He zun, whose inscription contains the first known reference to Zhongguo, or China

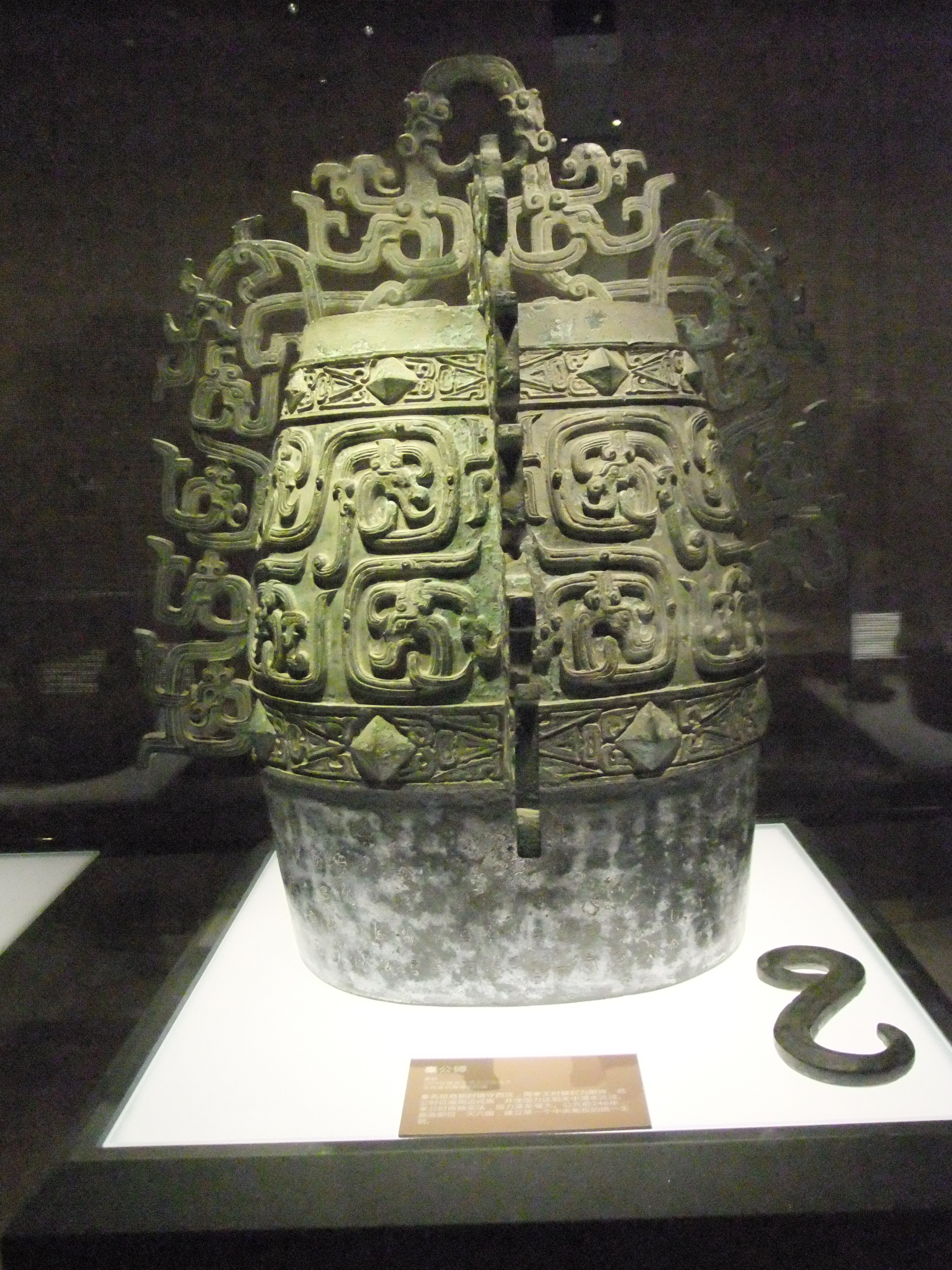
Bo of the Duke Qin, Spring and Autumn period (770–476 B.C.), excavated in 1978 in Taigongmiao Village, Baoji, Shaanxi.

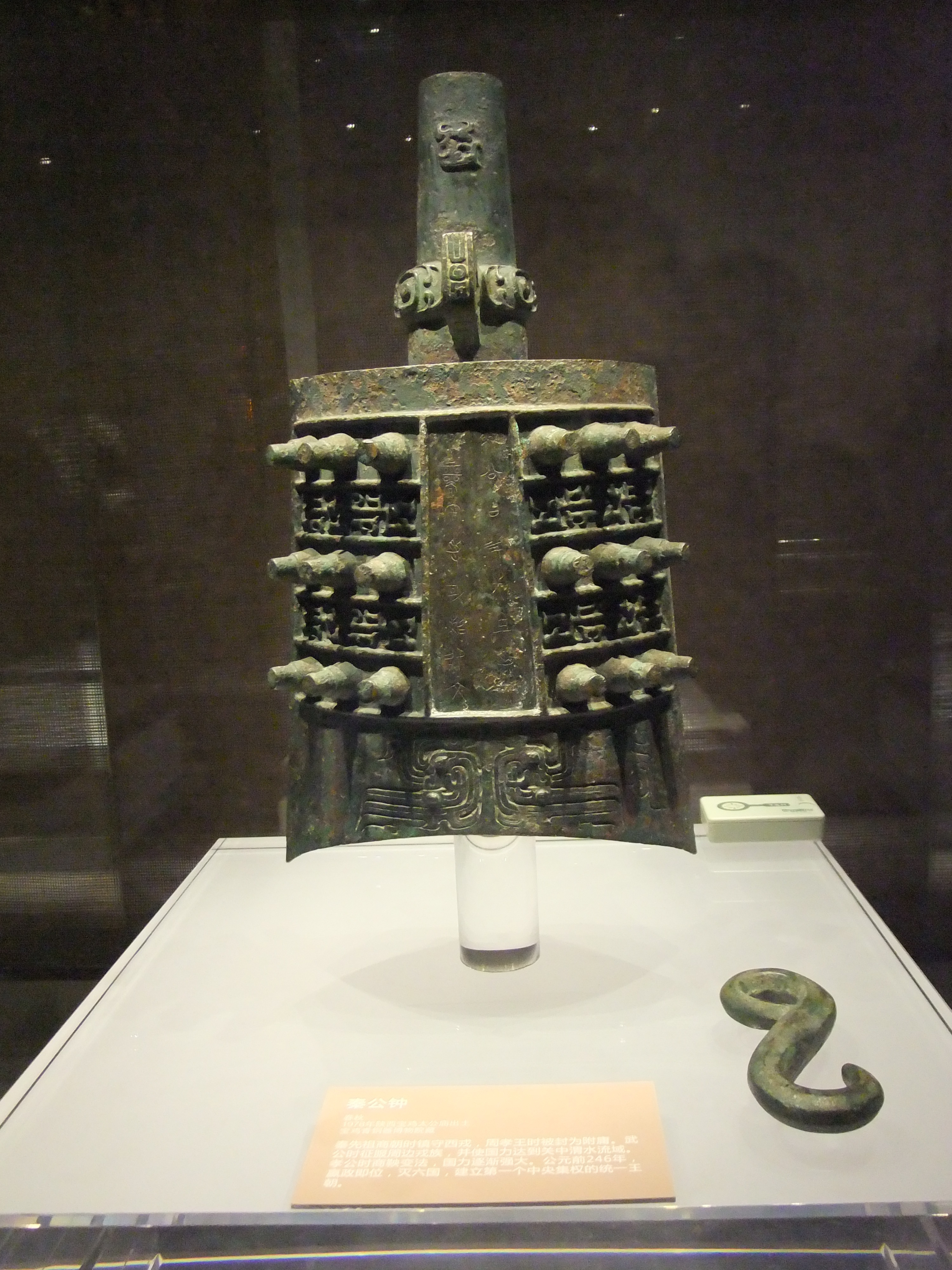
Bell of the Duke Qin, Spring and Autumn period (770–476 B.C.), excavated in 1978 in Taigongmiao Village, Baoji, Shaanxi.

== See also ==
- List of museums in China
