= Archaeological ruins of Liangzhu City =

Liangzhu City
- 良渚古城遗址 (Chinese)
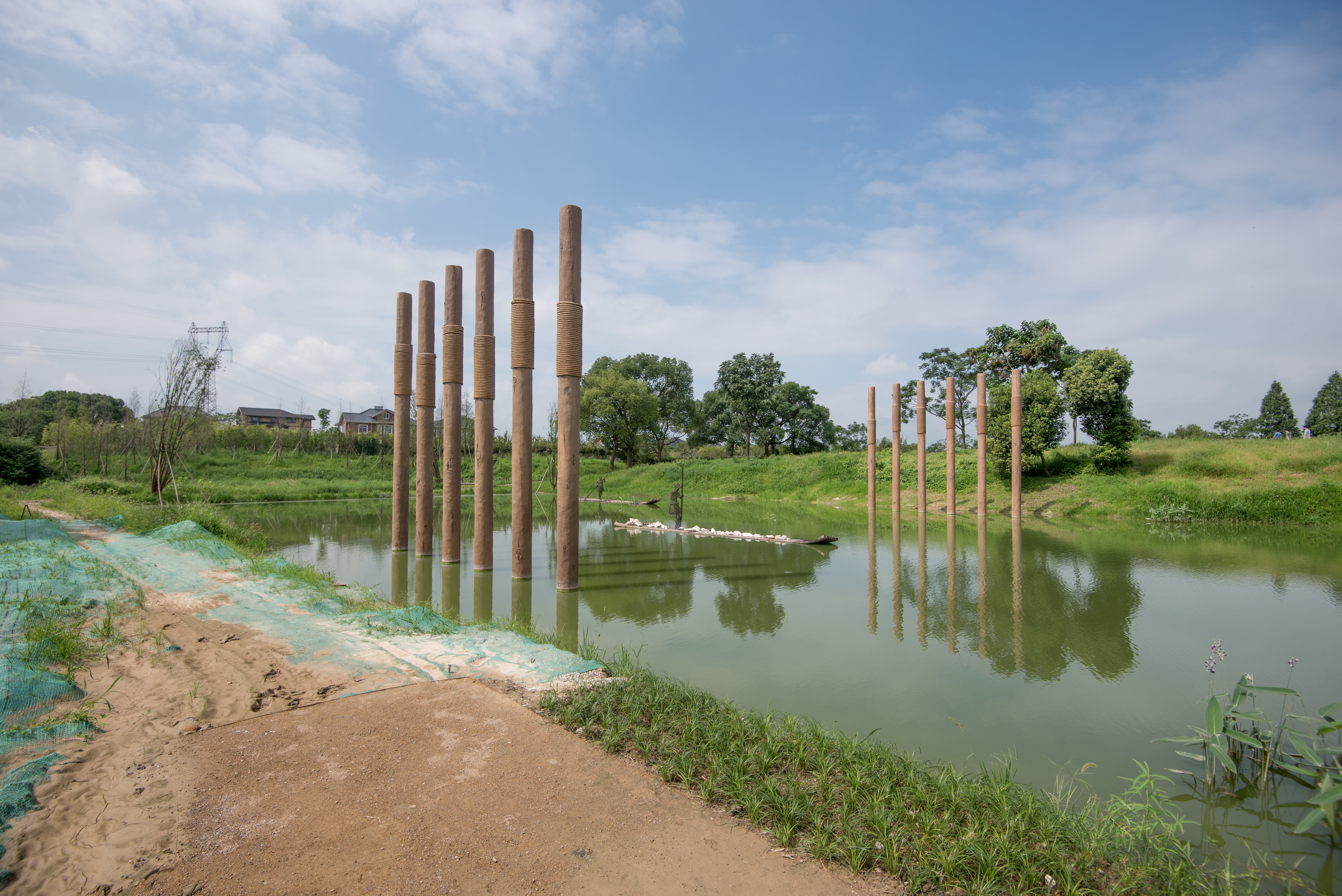
- Water gate at the Liangzhu site
- Interactive map of Liangzhu City
- 30°23′44″N 119°59′27″E
- Type: Settlement
- Cultures: Liangzhu culture
- Location: Yuhang district, Hangzhou, China

Site notes
- Discovered: 1936
- Management: Liangzhu Archaeological Site Administrative District Management Committee
- Website: lzsite.cn (in Chinese)

UNESCO World Heritage Site
- Official name: Archaeological Ruins of Liangzhu City
- Criteria: (iii), (iv)
- Reference: 1592
- Inscription: 2019 (43rd Session)
- Area: 1,433.66 ha (3,542.7 acres)
- Buffer zone: 9,980.29 ha (24,661.8 acres)

Chinese name
- Traditional Chinese: 良渚古城遺址
- Simplified Chinese: 良渚古城遗址
Transcriptions
Standard Mandarin
- Hanyu Pinyin: Liángzhǔ gǔchéng yízhǐ

Alternative Chinese name
- Traditional Chinese: 良渚遺址
- Simplified Chinese: 良渚遗址
Transcriptions
Standard Mandarin
- Hanyu Pinyin: Liángzhǔ Yízhǐ

The archaeological ruins of Liangzhu (Note: Liangzhu (/ˈljɑːŋˈdʒuː/)) City, or simply the Liangzhu site, are a cluster of Neolithic sites located in the Liangzhu Subdistrict and Pingyao Town of Yuhang, Hangzhou, China. Initially excavated by Shi Xingeng in 1936, the ruins were recognised to belong to a previously unknown civilisation, termed Liangzhu culture, in 1959. The site was confirmed as an ancient city after the discovery of its city walls in 2006.

Situated in the southwestern part of the Liangzhu cultural area, this city is thought to have been the political and spiritual centre of Liangzhu culture, exemplifying a prehistoric, rice-cultivating urban society of an early state in the Yangtze River basin. The site includes a walled city with palatial complexes, ceremonial areas, and an intricate hydraulic system, indicative of a highly developed society with centralised governance. The hydraulic system of Liangzhu is by far the earliest known one in the world. Existing from approximately 3300 to 2300 BCE, the city was ultimately abandoned, and the civilisation collapsed due to extensive flooding linked to climate change.

Recognised as one of the earliest examples of Chinese civilisation, the ruins are managed by the Liangzhu Site District Management Committee, which oversees the Liangzhu National Archaeological Site Park. The city ruins, along with the Yaoshan site, were designated a major cultural heritage sites under national protection in 1996, while the hydraulic system received provincial protection in 2017. Together, these sites were designated a UNESCO World Heritage Site in 2019.

== Discovery ==
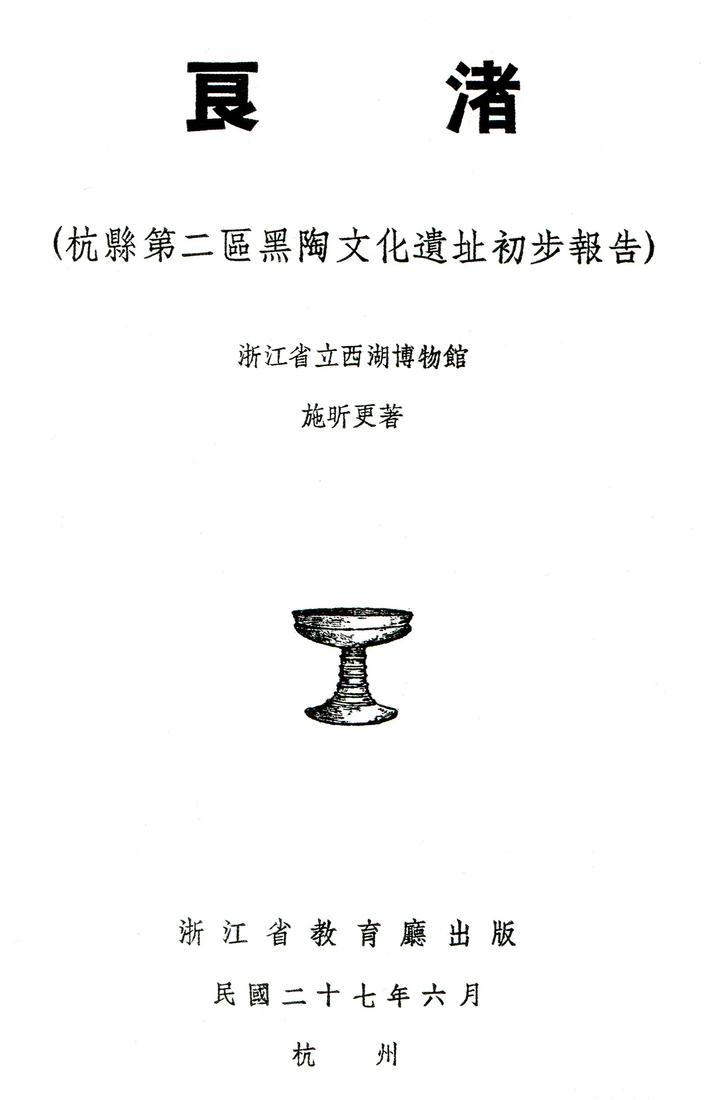
Cover page of Shi Xingeng's report on Liangzhu Site (1938)

In the 1930s, jade was unearthed in Liangzhu, due to the construction of a national highway connecting Nanjing and Hangzhou through the town. Very small in number, the jade was assumed to date back to Xia, Shang, Zhou or Han dynasties. In 1936, when Shi Xingeng of the West Lake Museum excavated the Gudang site near the Laohe Hill, he was reminded of similar black pottery and stone tools that he had seen in his hometown, Liangzhu. This triggered small-scale excavations in Liangzhu, of which relics were believed to be of Longshan culture.

Since 1953, excavations in Hangzhou, Wuxi and Huzhou pointed to further differences with the Longshan culture. The primitive culture in the lower reaches of the Yangtze River was named "Liangzhu culture" by Xia Nai in 1959. This notion gradually gained recognition following the discoveries of Liangzhu aristocratic tombs at numerous locations.

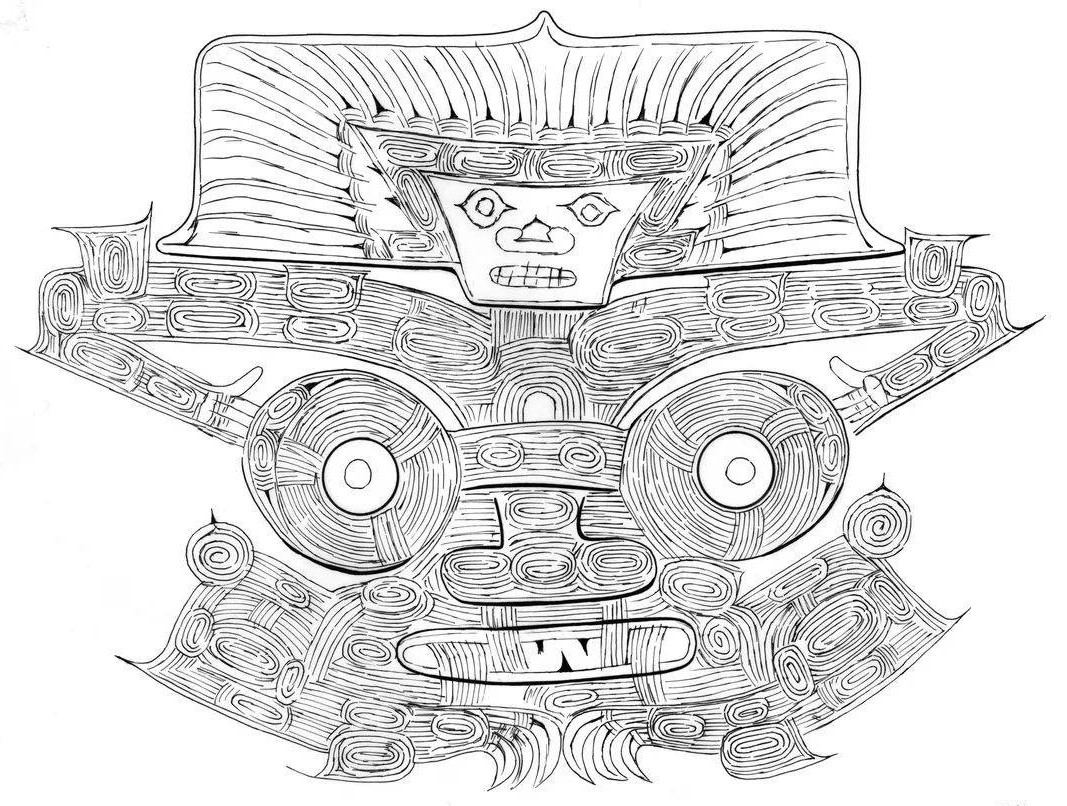
Intricate miniature carvings in Liangzhu jade discovered at Fanshan site in the 1980s

In 1973, the discovery of sophisticated jade artefacts from elite tombs of Liangzhu culture astonished archaeologists, as these items were determined to be approximately 5,000 years old, much earlier than previous expectations. Liangzhu, unlike other archaeological sites, is a cluster of sites, which was given hope for further jade discovery. In 1986, more than 3,000 jade pieces were excavated at the Fanshan site in Liangzhu. In 1987, rumours of jade at the nearby Yaoshan graveyard drew thousands of farmers who began looting the tombs until police and archaeologists intervened. Since then, Liangzhu jade artefacts have made their way into the global antique market.

In 2006, to re-settle farmers in the core area of Liangzhu Site, Liu Bin led an archaeological team to conduct excavation on the west side of the plateau of Putaofan site in Pingyao Town, which led to the discovery of a north–south trench and a plateau paralleled to the trench in the east. Between the trench and the plateau, a layer of stones was unearthed 3 metres (9.8 ft) beneath the ground, which proved to be a city wall. Through extensive coring and excavation within an area of 100 square kilometres (39 sq mi), the general layout of the city was revealed.

== Geography ==
Liangzhu Ancient City is situated in the central part of Yuhang district of Hangzhou, spanning Pingyao Town and Liangzhu Subdistrict, and the southwestern part of the Liangzhu cultural area. It lies within a C-shaped basin where the western Zhejiang mountains meet the Hangzhou-Jiaxing-Huzhou Plain. This basin is bordered on its north, west, and south by the branches of the Tianmu Mountains, which are rich in resources. The East Tiaoxi River flows through the site from the southwest to the northeast, creating an extensive network of waterways interspersed with small mounds. The low-lying terrain of the C-shaped basin provides direct access to Taihu Lake to the northeast, forming a key transport route and significant rice-producing area.

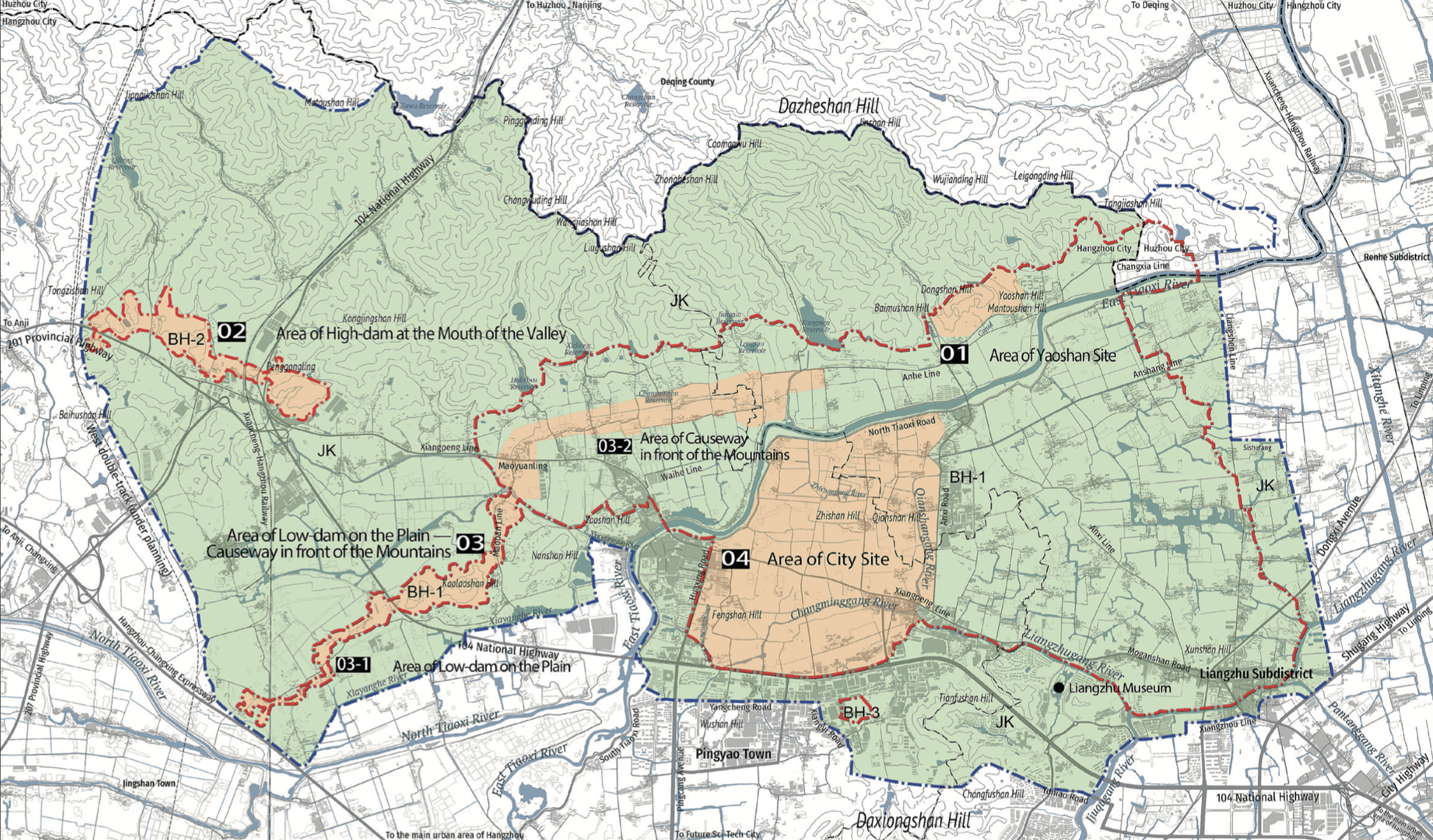
Topographic map of Liangzhu Site

To manage water resources effectively, including flood control, irrigation, and transport, the Liangzhu people constructed an extensive water conservancy system northwest of the city. This system, considered the earliest known large-scale water management project in the world, controlled an area of nearly 100 square kilometres (39 sq mi), encompassing the city and its surroundings. The core of Liangzhu City featured a "triple city" structure, which, together with external ceremonial sites and the water conservancy system, defined its main area. The city itself spanned approximately 3 square kilometres (1.2 sq mi), while the inclusion of the outer city expanded this to 6.3 square kilometres (2.4 sq mi). The city exercised control over more than 40 square kilometres (15 sq mi) of the basin, which hosted over 100 Liangzhu cultural sites of varying significance.

The archaeological ruins of Liangzhu City consists of four sites, which are interconnected through shared social and cultural ties, forming a continuous chronology. Collectively, they create a coherent heritage property within an area of 100 square kilometres (39 sq mi), unified by a single buffer zone of 9,980.29 hectares (24,661.8 acres).

Distribution of archaeological sites of Liangzhu City
Area	C14 age	Size	Identified elements	Centroid coordinate
City	ca. 3000- 2300 BCE	881.45 hectares (2,178.1 acres)	Fanshan Cemetery	30°23′44″N 119°59′27″E
City	ca. 3000- 2300 BCE	881.45 hectares (2,178.1 acres)	Jiangjiashan Cemetery	30°23′44″N 119°59′27″E
City	ca. 3000- 2300 BCE	881.45 hectares (2,178.1 acres)	Wenjiashan Cemetery	30°23′44″N 119°59′27″E
City	ca. 3000- 2300 BCE	881.45 hectares (2,178.1 acres)	Bianjiashan Cemetery	30°23′44″N 119°59′27″E
City	ca. 3000- 2300 BCE	881.45 hectares (2,178.1 acres)	Palace Area	30°23′44″N 119°59′27″E
City	ca. 3000- 2300 BCE	881.45 hectares (2,178.1 acres)	Inner City	30°23′44″N 119°59′27″E
City	ca. 3000- 2300 BCE	881.45 hectares (2,178.1 acres)	Outer City	30°23′44″N 119°59′27″E
City	ca. 3000- 2300 BCE	881.45 hectares (2,178.1 acres)	Ancient River Courses	30°23′44″N 119°59′27″E
Yaoshan	ca. 3300-3100 BCE	66.56 hectares (164.5 acres)	Yaoshan Cemetery and Altar	30°25′34″N 120°00′43″E
High-dam at the Mouth of the Valley	ca. 3100- 2600 BCE	136.41 hectares (337.1 acres)	High-dam at the Mouth of the Valley	30°25′13″N 119°54′13″E
Low-dam on the Plain	ca. 3000- 2600 BCE	349.24 hectares (863.0 acres)	Low-dam on the Plain	30°24′16″N 119°56′48″E
Low-dam on the Plain	ca. 3000- 2600 BCE	349.24 hectares (863.0 acres)	Causeway in Front of the Mountains	30°24′16″N 119°56′48″E

== Description ==
=== Fortified city ===
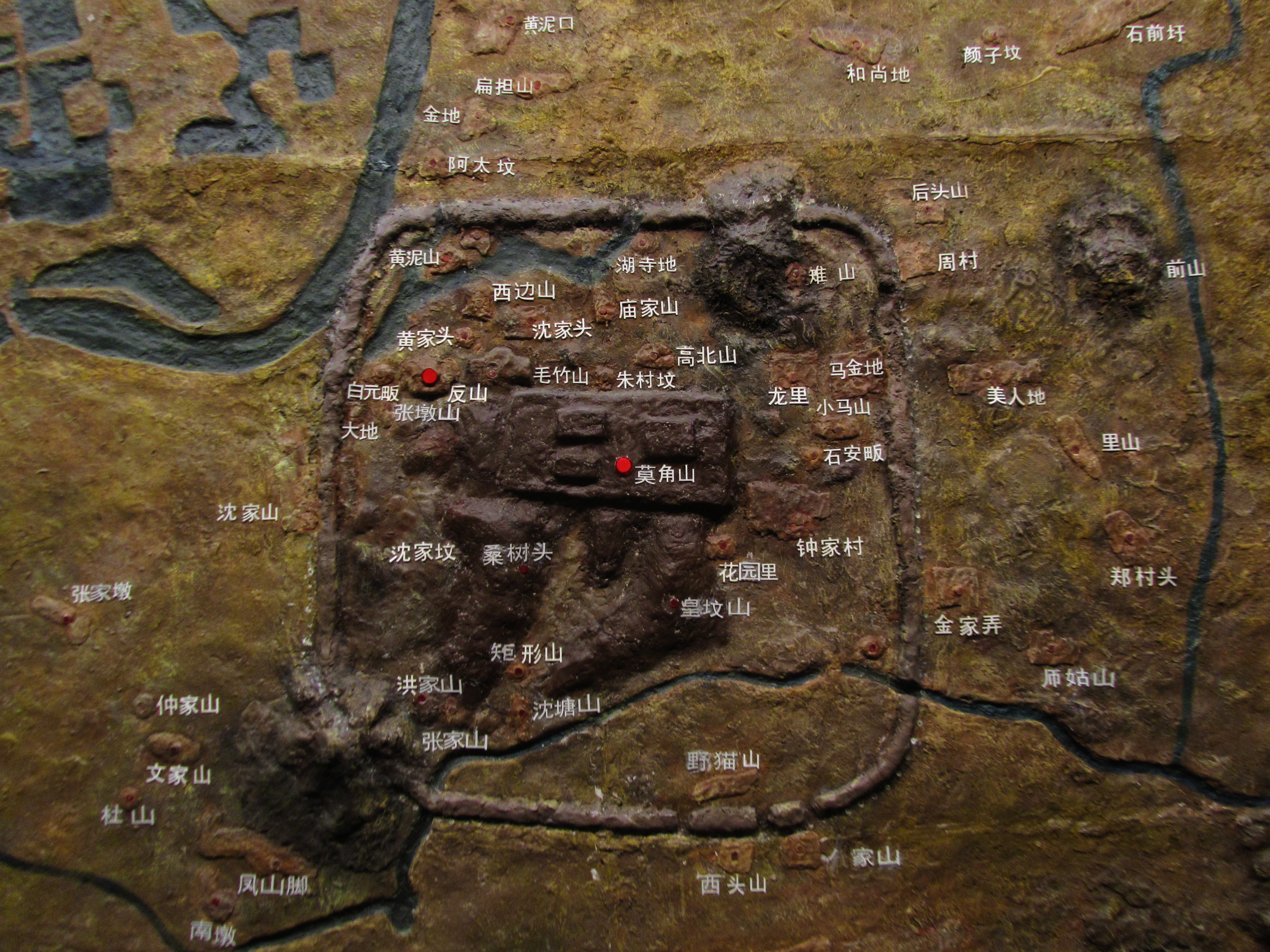
Layout of the city

The city at the heart of the Liangzhu ruins represents the core of its ancient urban civilization and is positioned between Dazheshan and Daxiongshan Hills. It comprises the Palace Area, Inner City, and Outer City, collectively covering 631 hectares (1,560 acres). The city is notable for its fortified walls featuring water and land gates, terraces, and an interconnected system of natural and artificial waterways.

Within the city are significant cemeteries such as Fanshan and Jiangjiashan, where a total of 4,229 jade artefacts were discovered, showcasing the cultural and artistic sophistication of Liangzhu. In the middle of the city, the Mojiaoshan palatial compound was built on an immense artificial trapezoidal mound covering about 30 hectares (74 acres). This platform supported three smaller palace foundations, including the Damojiaoshan mound, which reached heights of up to 15 metres (49 ft), and the Xiaomojiaoshan and Wuguishan mounds. Across the lower Yangtze region, there are over 600 identified Liangzhu settlement sites, some of which contain an iconic earthen platform, thought to be provincial seats, yet none match the scale of the Mojiaoshan platform.

There was only one road through the city walls, with most transport assumed to be carried on boats. Both within and around the city, natural rivers were enhanced by a 30 kilometres (19 mi) long network of moats, ditches, and canals, managed by eight water gates that controlled the city's water system. While direct evidence of rice fields has not been discovered around the city, significant carbonised rice deposits, thought to be silos, were found south of the Mojiaoshan Platform. This suggests that the Liangzhu elite possibly collected surplus rice from provinces to support the capital's operations.

=== Hydraulic system ===
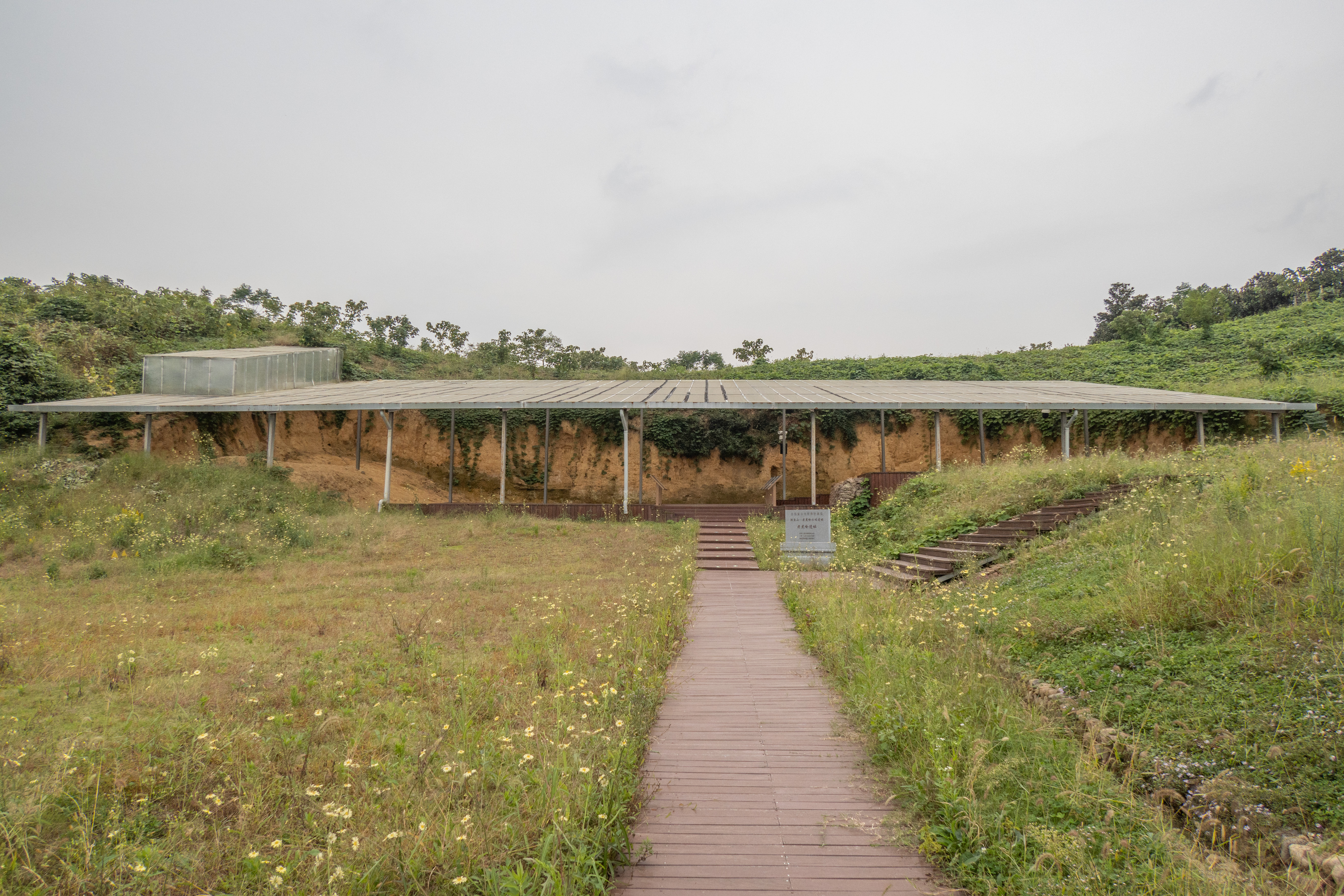
High dam at Laohuling

The hydraulic system of Liangzhu is by far the earliest known in the world. Initially, the high dams were constructed, followed closely by the building of low dams and levees within a brief time frame, some of which were later reconstructed. The High-dam at the Mouth of the Valley, predating the city site, is situated northwest of the city and spans 7.6 hectares (19 acres), forming a 2.3 kilometres (1.4 mi) flood retention system. Strategically positioned in low-lying gaps between hills, these dams created large reservoirs at the mountain bases. The Low-dam on the Plain and the Causeway in Front of the Mountains, built simultaneously with the city, form a cohesive water management system spanning approximately 349.24 hectares (863.0 acres). The low dams were built over swampy land with a base layer of iron-depleted, whitish clay due to long-term water saturation. Grayish clay bundles wrapped in grass, resembling sandbags, were layered as an artificial base, followed by a primary construction layer of pure yellowish clay also enclosed in grass wraps. The Tangshan levees stretched at least 5 km, with widths between 20–50 metres (66–164 ft) m and heights of 2–7 metres (6 ft 7 in – 23 ft 0 in). In their central section, a pair of parallel dikes created a channel-like structure for water storage and controlled distribution. To the east of Tangshan, artificial mounds were built, separated by a north–south ridge.

=== Yaoshan Cemetery and Altar ===
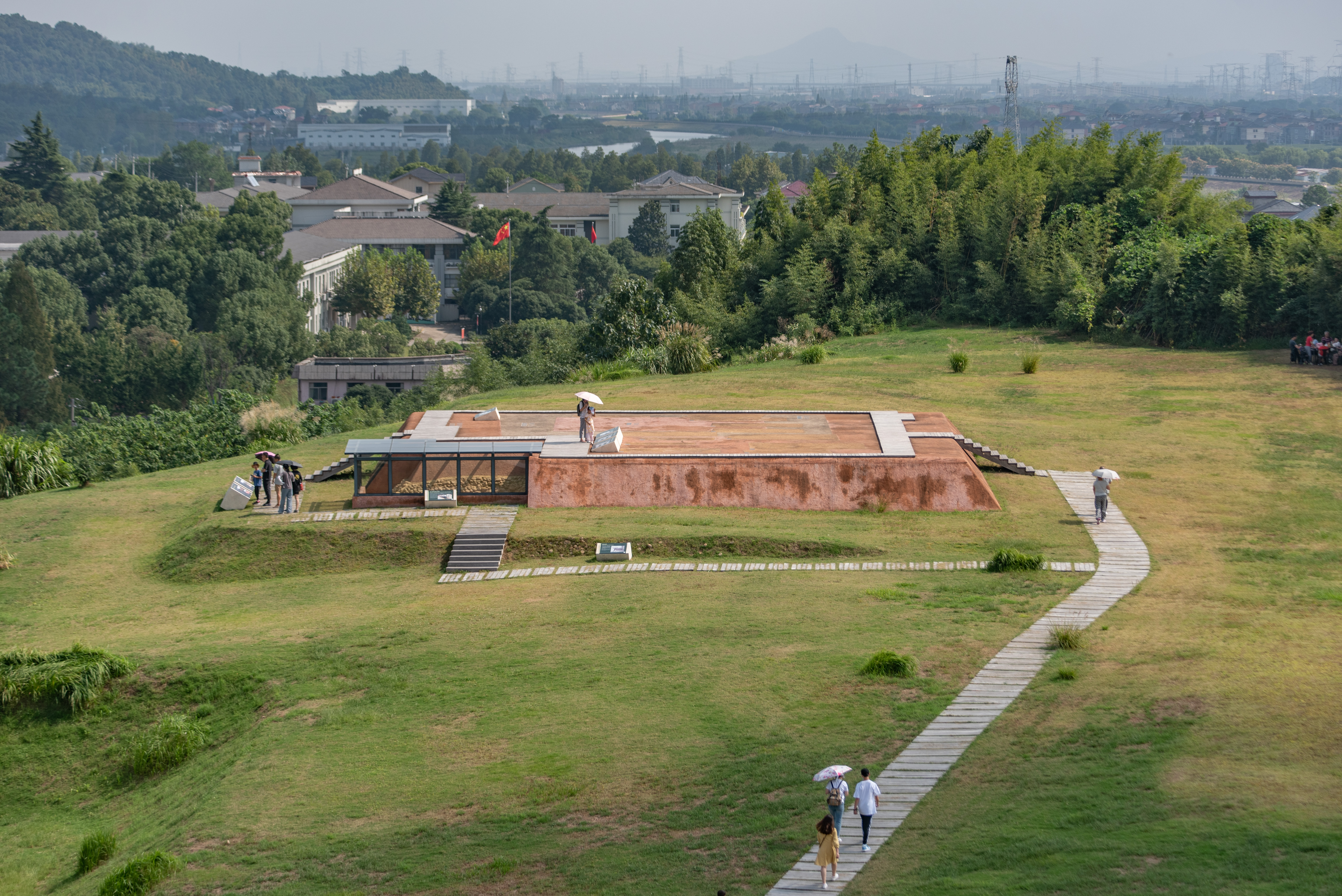
Yaoshan Site

The Yaoshan Site, an early part of the Liangzhu City, is situated atop a hill approximately 5 kilometres (3.1 mi) northeast of the city. This area of 4.3 hectares (11 acres), which includes an altar and a noble tomb predating the city, yielded 678 jade artefacts, such as jade cong and jade yue, that symbolise power and belief, indicating social stratification and religious unity before the city's construction. The site's artefacts demonstrate the emergence of distinctive Liangzhu cultural features, dating to around 3300–3100 BC. Jade was considered a highly valuable material, as evidenced by its extensive use despite the time and efforts to process it. Most jade artifacts were found in tombs, positioned around the deceased, signifying their ritual or symbolic value. The tradition of jade craftsmanship established by Liangzhu influenced subsequent generations. Among the notable discoveries is a carefully crafted piece weighing 6.5 kilograms (14 lb), known as the "King of Cong."

The main structure of the Yaoshan Altar is made from sandy red soil at the summit of the mountain, forming a rectangular, bucket-shaped earthen platform bordered by a stone-covered edge. This platform runs along a north–south axis, measuring around 40 metres (130 ft) in length from east to west and 19 metres (62 ft) in width from north to south. The stone ridge at the northwest corner of the platform stands at nearly 1 metre (3 ft 3 in) in height. Stone ridges were also added to the mountain below the platform to stabilise the side slopes and refine the flat surface. At the centre of the western half of the platform is a square frame with an inner division, measuring about 9 metres (30 ft) from east to west and 11 metres (36 ft) from north to south. The contrast between the interior and exterior soil colours makes this structure distinct at the mountain's peak. This purposeful arrangement likely had a specific function. However, the construction of the noble cemetery, with its rows of burials, disrupted this structure, suggesting it was no longer in use or relevant when the burials were made.

== Conservation ==
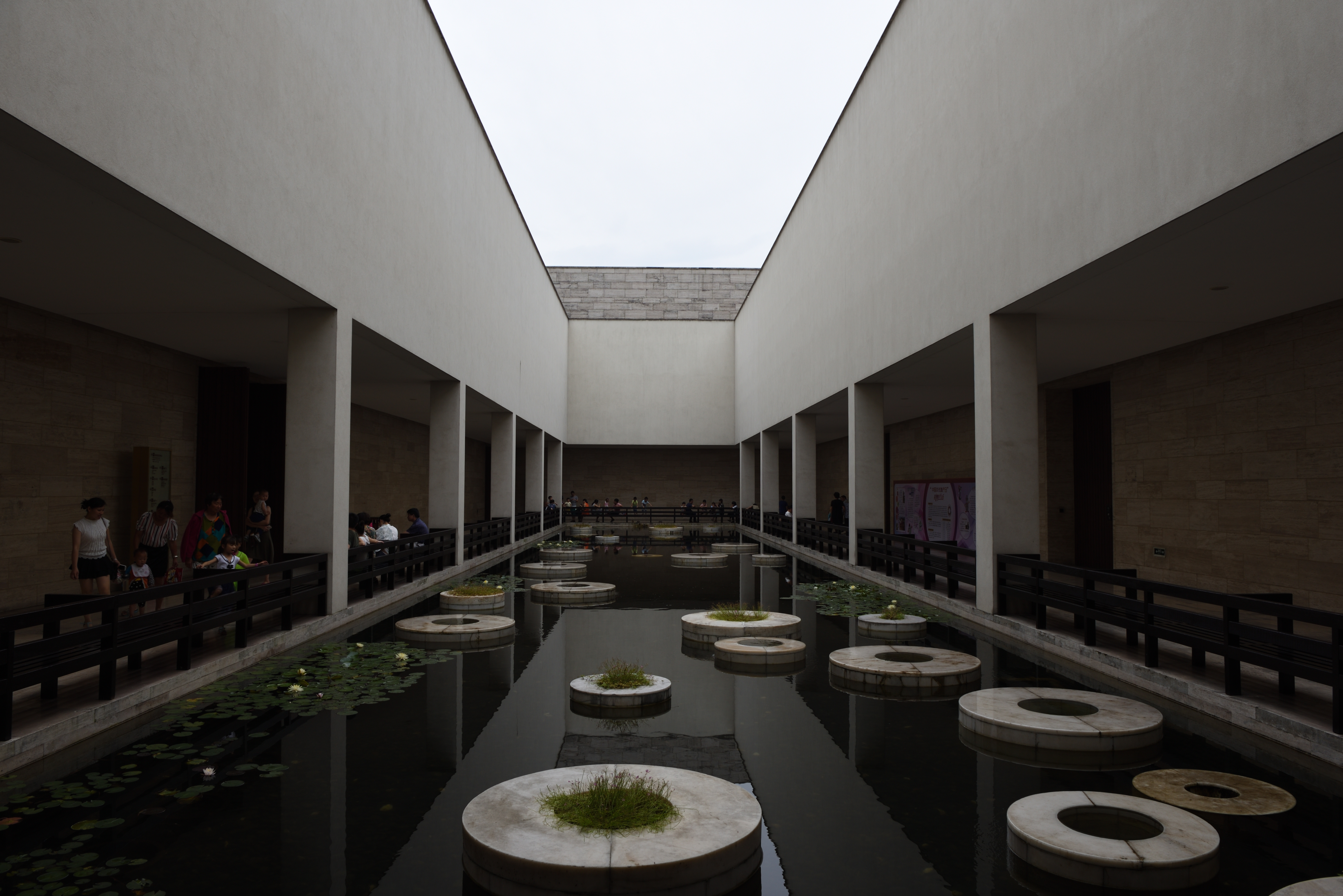
Courtyard of Liangzhu Museum

=== Administration ===
The ruins, along with its buffer zone, is managed by the Hangzhou Liangzhu Archaeological Site Administrative District Management Committee. The city ruins, along with the Yaoshan site, were designated a major cultural heritage sites under national protection in 1996, while the hydraulic system received provincial protection in 2017. Together, these sites were designated a UNESCO World Heritage Site in 2019. In July 2019, the Liangzhu National Archaeological Site Park was established, encompassing nearly all key archaeological sites of the Liangzhu culture with facilities for exhibitions and tourism.

=== Exhibitions ===
The Liangzhu Museum near Liangzhu Site was completed in June 2018, which stores excavated relics and showcases them using advanced multimedia displays and cultural integration with public spaces. The exhibitions incorporate advanced technologies like VR, AR, 3D-printed models, physical simulations, and ecological signposting to create an immersive and engaging visitor experience. Techniques include human models at life scale to reflect daily life and reconstructed scenes based on archaeological evidence, enhancing visitor engagement. In 2020, the Liangzhu Site District Management Committee received Special Mention of German Design Award for its design idea of "translating the graphic pictogram elements of the ancient culture into designs for day-to-day items and clothing is fascinating." Despite the COVID-19 pandemic, more than five million people had visited the park since 2020.

In Hangzhou, the Zhejiang Provincial Museum showcases a collection of Liangzhu relics, including King of Cong. The China Jiangnan Water Town Culture Museum also features an array of Liangzhu artefacts. Internationally, Liangzhu jade pieces are part of the collections in institutions such as the Metropolitan Museum of Art and the National Palace Museum.

== See also ==
- Liangzhu Culture
- Liangzhu Museum
