= Shi Xingeng =

Chinese geologist and archaeologist

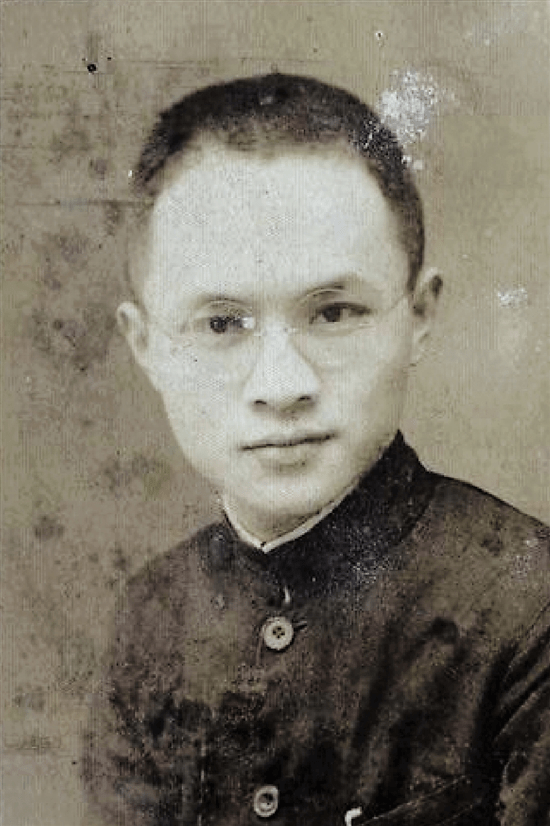
- Born: 2 August 1912; Hang County, Zhejiang, China
- Died: 29 May 1939 (aged 26); Rui'an, Zhejiang, China
- Education: Zhejiang Provincial First Middle School
- Scientific career
- Fields: Archaeology; Geologist; Mineralogy
- Workplaces: West Lake Museum

Chinese name
- Chinese: 施昕更
Transcriptions
Standard Mandarin
- Hanyu Pinyin: Shī Xīngēng

Shi Xingeng (2 August 1912 – 29 May 1939) was a Chinese geologist, mineralogist, and archaeologist. He is known as the earliest scientific excavator of the Liangzhu site and a prominent researcher of Liangzhu culture, for he conducted the earliest scientific excavations of the archaeological ruins of Liangzhu.

== Early life ==
On 2 August 1912, Shi was born in Liangzhu Town of Hangzhou, Zhejiang, China. His father, Shi Fucai, was formerly an employee at a grocery store, while his mother, Luo Lanying, was a farmer. When Shi Xingeng was born, the family's fortunes declined due to legal troubles.

In 1918, Shi Xingeng began attending the Liangzhu Central Primary School. After graduating from primary school in 1924, financial difficulties initially prevented him from continuing his education. However, due to the persistent persuasion of the school principal, his parents borrowed money to support his studies. He then enrolled in the junior section of Zhejiang Provincial First Middle School in Hangzhou. After completing his junior studies in 1927, he joined the artisan class in the Weaving Design group at the Vocational School Attached to the College of Engineering at Third Zhongshan University, where he studied textile design while working part-time. During this period, he also took painting lessons from Chang Shuhong, a teacher at the college. In 1928, he had to discontinue his studies due to poverty.

== Career ==
=== West Lake Expo ===
In 1929, the West Lake Expo was held in Hangzhou. Shi, recommended by his teacher, became an administrator in Section A of the Art Gallery at the Expo. His responsibilities included managing exhibits, explaining displays, and answering visitors’ questions. This role provided him with significant exposure to valuable artworks and cultural relics. He read extensively about related topics and sought guidance from individuals such as the gallery director, Lin Fengmian, and Section A's chief executive, Li Puyuan, from whom he gained substantial knowledge.

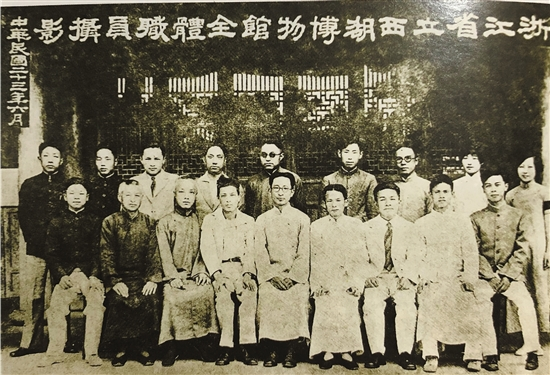
Group photo was taken of all staff members at the West Lake Museum in June 1934, with Shi standing as the third person from the left in the back row

Following the conclusion of the West Lake Expo in October 1929, the provincial government decided to establish the Zhejiang Provincial West Lake Museum to preserve the exhibits for future visits and research. In 1930, Shi began working in the museum's Department of Natural Sciences, specifically in the Geology and Mineralogy Section, as an assistant. His duties included conducting geological surveys, collecting minerals, and organising, recording, illustrating, and displaying specimens. In 1931, he accompanied the head of the Geology and Mineralogy Section, Sheng Xinfu, on his first field expedition to collect specimens. By 1932, Shi had begun independently collecting specimens. In 1934, he represented the West Lake Museum at the National Metallurgy and Geology Joint Exhibition in Tianjin. Up until 1937, when the Japanese invasion reached Zhejiang, Shi's geological research had taken him to various parts of the province. He published numerous papers on geology and mineralogy in the Journal of Zhejiang Provincial West Lake Museum and compiled the Records of Zhejiang Minerals in 1937 (unpublished), detailing the distribution of minerals in the province.

=== Liangzhu ===
In 1936, Wei Juxian, director of the Nanjing Antiquities Preservation Institute, encountered several stone artefacts and learned from antique dealers that they had been unearthed during the construction of a public cemetery in the Gushan and Laohe Hill area of Gudang, Hangzhou. Wei subsequently contacted the West Lake Museum, and on 31 May, they collaborated on an exploratory excavation at the Gudang site, aiming to confirm the existence of Neolithic culture in the Yangtze River Delta. This marked the first modern archaeological excavation in the region.

Shi, who had no prior archaeological experience, was ordered by the museum to participate in the project. He noticed that some of the collected stone artefacts seemed familiar, resembling items he had often seen in his hometown. The next day, he returned to Liangzhu to search for clues related to Neolithic sites. In July, he conducted a second survey and roughly identified the distribution of the site. During a third survey in November, on 3 November, he discovered two black polished pottery fragments at the bottom of a pond near Qipanfen in Liangzhu. After reading the field archaeology excavation report on Chengziya, he realised the connection between Liangzhu artefacts and the black pottery unearthed at Chengziya in Shandong.

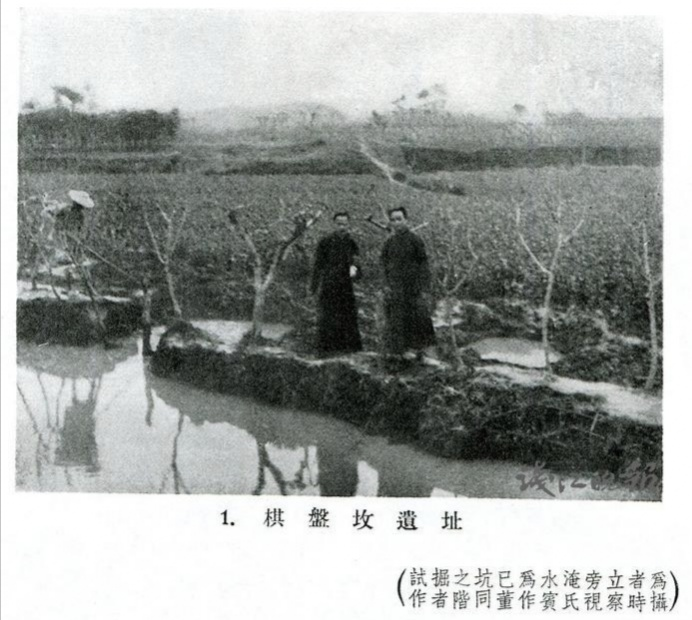
Shi and Dong Zuobin at Liangzhu

After discovering the black pottery, Shi dedicated nearly six months to this research. Before obtaining formal excavation permits, he conducted three small-scale preliminary digs: from 1 to 10 December 1936, from 26 to 30 December 1936, and from 8 to 20 March 1937. The first two excavations were at Qipanfen, while the third involved five sites in Liangzhu and two locations at Changming Bridge. In April 1937, Shi completed the manuscript Liangzhu: A Preliminary Report on the Black Pottery Cultural Site in the Second District of Hang County. Scholars from the Institute of History and Philology at Academia Sinica provided guidance on the draft, and in April, Dong Zuobin and Liang Siyong visited Hangzhou and conducted an on-site investigation of Liangzhu, accompanied by Shi. That same month, a brief report titled Summary of the Trial Excavation of Ancient Cultural Sites in the Second District of Hang County was published in Shanghai’s The China Times.

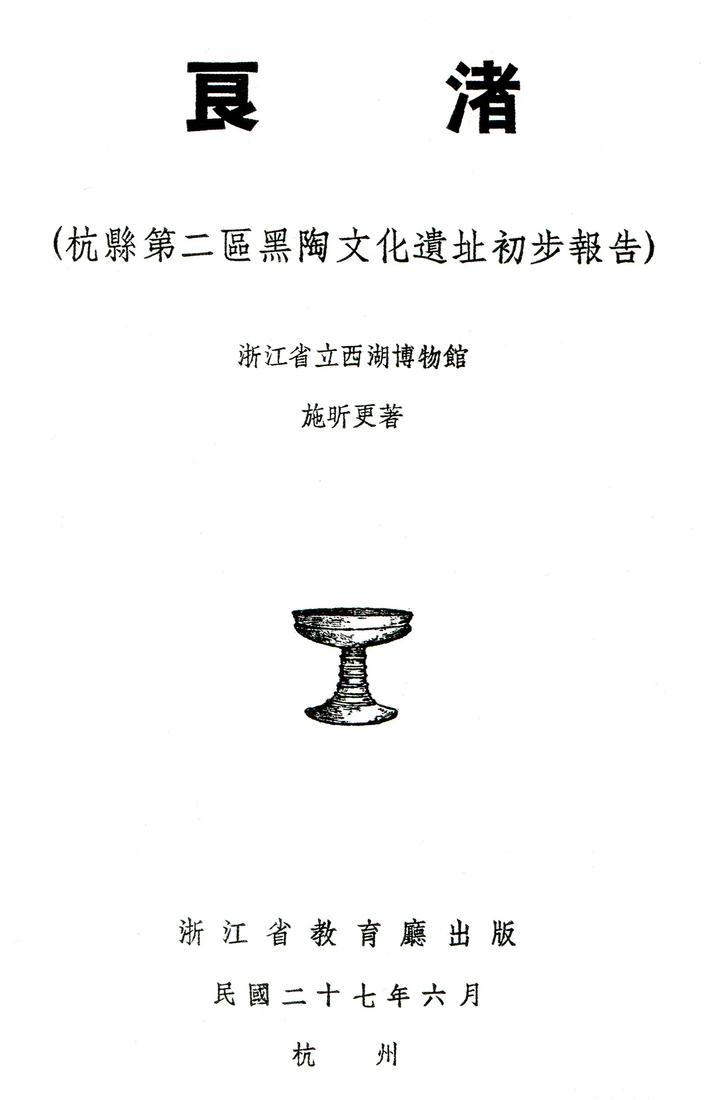
Cover page of Liangzhu

Liangzhu was initially printed in Hangzhou. Soon after, the Japanese invasion of China led to the Battle of Shanghai and the aerial battle over Jianqiao in Hangzhou. The West Lake Museum was relocated to the south-central region of Zhejiang, while Shi returned to his hometown, Liangzhu, to oversee the printing of Liangzhu. On 24 December, Hangzhou fell to Japanese forces. Shi bid farewell to his family and travelled alone to Lanxi to reunite with his colleagues from the West Lake Museum. The original type and illustration plates remained in Hangzhou, and he only managed to take an old manuscript with him. With the encouragement of Museum Director Dong Yumao, Shi revised the manuscript, which Dong submitted to the Zhejiang Provincial Department of Education, then also in exile, to secure funding for publication. Shi's colleague and close friend, Zhong Guoyi, carried the manuscript by ferry from Wenzhou to the Shanghai International Settlement. In August 1938, Liangzhu was published by the China Science Company in Shanghai.

== Death ==
After the West Lake Museum was relocated, its funding was significantly reduced, bringing it to the brink of dissolution. Shi expressed a desire to work at the Central Institute of Archaeology, and Dong Yumao attempted to arrange this, but Shi's lack of formal education prevented it from happening. Dong then recommended him for a position in Rui'an. By August 1938 at the latest, Shi had moved to Rui'an, where he soon took up the role of secretary at the county's Anti-Japanese Self-Defence Committee. On 29 May 1939, he died at the county's Second Hospital due to scarlet fever complicated by peritonitis.

== Family ==
In 1930, Shi married Fu Aile, a native of Anxi Town near Liangzhu, and they had three sons named Yiliang, Jianliang, and Jian'an. The names means "remembering Liangzhu", "building Liangzhu" and "building Anxi" respectively. His second and third sons died young. His wife died two years after Shi's death. After 1949, Sheng Xinfu visited Liangzhu to find his oldest son, Yiliang and contacted Dong Yumao. As a result, Shi Yiliang joined the Zhejiang Provincial Museum, formerly the West Lake Museum, in 1951. During the Anti-Rightist Movement, he was reassigned to work in a forestry station. Shi's grandson, Shi Shiying, later worked at the Liangzhu Site Management Office.

== Legacy ==
Swedish geologist Johan Gunnar Andersson, based on the theory of cultural diffusion and the discovery of painted pottery from the Yangshao culture, proposed that the Chinese Civilisation originate in the West, sparking debates in academia. Additionally, Wei Juxian and Hu Xingzhi, the two reviewers of Liangzhu, debated whether Zhejiang had Neolithic culture. Liangzhu addressed the former issue by confirming the independence of Chinese civilisation through black pottery, which was absent in Western cultures, and in conjunction with the black pottery of Chengziya. It also proved that Zhejiang had Neolithic culture. However, influenced by the cultural diffusion theory, Liangzhu regarded Liangzhu and Chengziya as part of the Longshan culture.

Before Shi's work, Wei Juxian and Chen Zhiliang had discovered traces of Neolithic culture in various locations, and He Tianxing had found the Liangzhu site itself. Shi was the first to conduct a scientific excavation of the Liangzhu site. His archaeological work was praised as having the "greatest gains and highest academic value" in the initial phase of Liangzhu culture research. The book Liangzhu laid the foundation for archaeological work in the southeast coastal China.

== See also ==
- Liangzhu culture
- Liangzhu site
