= Royal Jade cong =

Neolithic Chinese jade cong

- 玉琮王
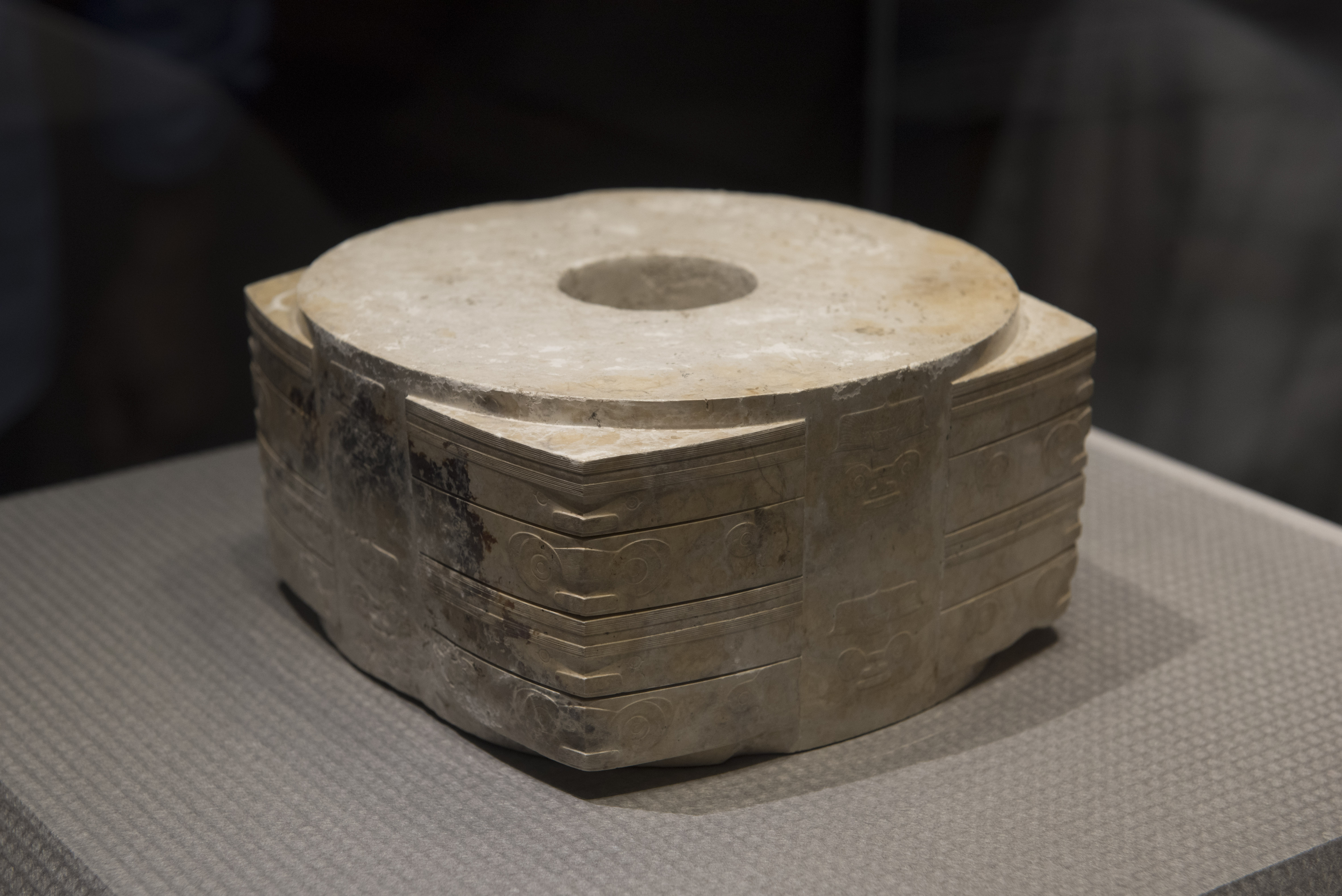
- Material: jade
- Height: 8.9-centimetre (3.5 in)
- Weight: 6.5-kilogram (14 lb)
- Created: Liangzhu culture (3300–2300 BC)
- Discovered: 1986; Fanshan, Yuhang, Zhejiang
- Present location: Zhejiang Provincial Museum

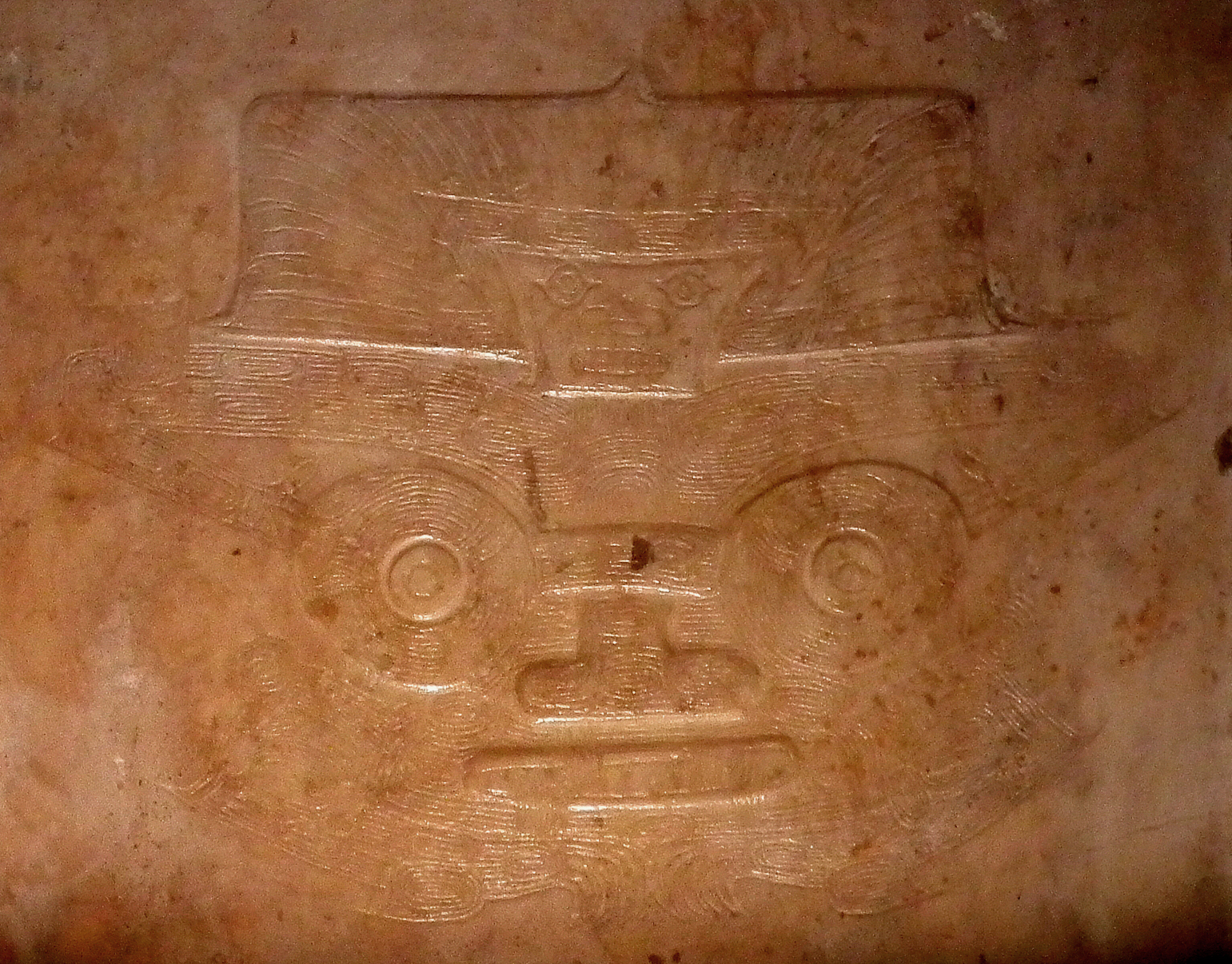
Semi-human animal image repeated twice on each side of the cong

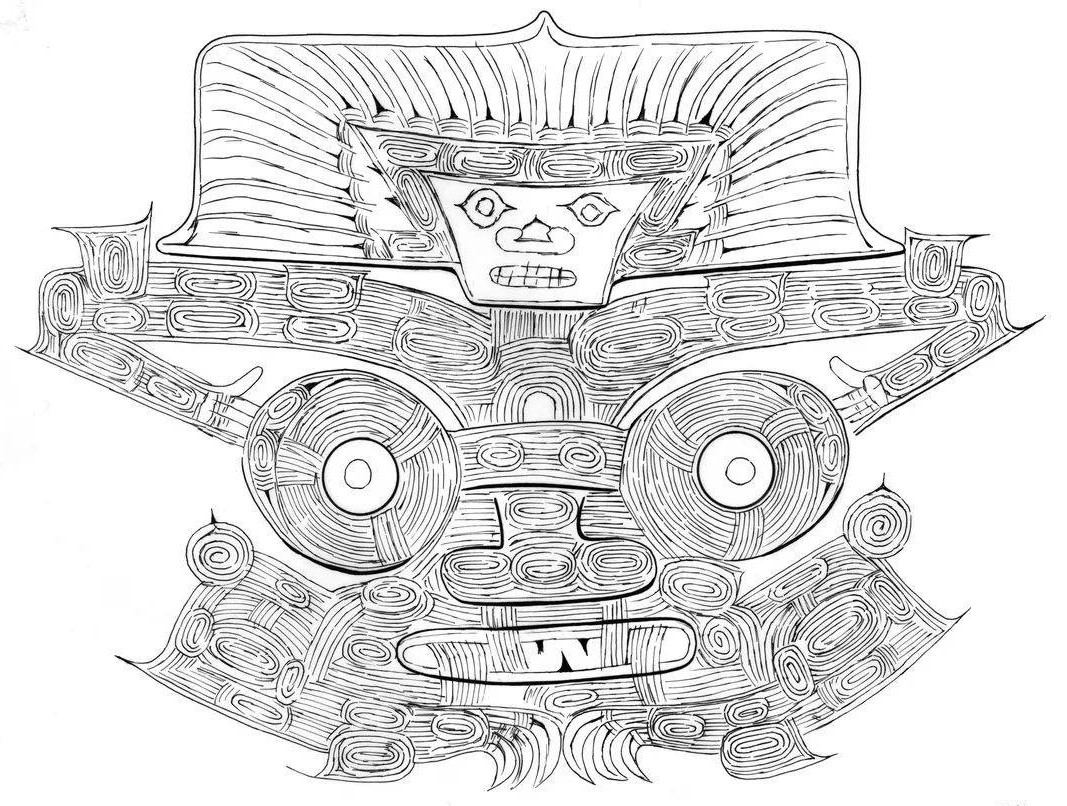
Drawing of a semi-human animal image

Royal Jade cong (Chinese: 玉琮王; pinyin: yù cóng wáng) is a jade cong found in the tomb at Fanshan cemetery, archaeological site of the Liangzhu culture.

== Discovery ==
Royal jade cong was found next to the head of the male buried in Tomb 12 at Fanshan cemetery (today Yuhang, Zhejiang), "the richest of all Liangzhu cemeteries in terms of the quantity and quality of burial objects". Five smaller cong were found near the arms of this male, and his grave contained 641 jades of other types, with addition to numerous beads and flakes. It is the richest of nine shaft burials in the Fanshan cemetery.

== Description ==
Royal jade cong is exceptionally massive, with 8.9 centimeters high and 6.5 kilograms in weight. According to museum site it is "the most impressive of all the jade cong of Liangzhu culture". Because of its large weight, it has been dubbed the "king of cong". It was made by first sawing a rectangular block out of a pebble and then drilling a hole from top to bottom, then grinding parts of the block away "to leave what looks like a cylinder with four corners projecting from it". The corners are not quite right angled, so a block that was originally square now has gently bulging sides; this effect cost the craftsman much labor. The corners have paired-eye designs that resemble faces, which are standard to cong. Uniquely, however, royal jade cong have a more complicated design on the sides, midway between corners (this design has only been found in Tomb 12 and Tomb 22 of Fanshan, which are commonly interpreted as the burials of a ruler of the city and his wife). Repeated twice on each side, this semi-human animal image consists of a trapezoidal human face with a feathered headdress, wide flat nose and circular eyes whose arms turn inward to touch a pair of spectacled eyes belonging to a beast. The beast, with wide nose and mouth with four tusks, seems to be resting its head on its clawed forelegs. Moreover, on each corner of the cong, beginning at the top, we see a pair of small circular eyes with horizontal prongs, then big spectacled eyes, then the circular eyes again, then the spectacled eyes. According to Wang "this link with the full form of design tempts us to interpret other features: the striated bands just above the circular eyes might for instance stand for the feathered headdress".

=== Significance and symbolism ===
Lu Jianfang maintained that cong identify power, generation and status among members of Liangzhu elite and its clans. He also believed that the levels of imagery up and down a cong signified the clan's age, and semi-human animal images identified the deceased and his generational staus. Since the royal cong had two layers each of semi-human and animal image, if we accept his theory this means that deceased died with one generation of offspring. Childs-Johnson interprets design of humanoid riding the beast as:

a symbol of metamorphic ascension and transformation. Pairs of large cosmic eyes, symbolizing the natural power of sun and moon, whose cosmic rays define the breath of life, are equally comfortable defining the power of avian flight. Although we do not know the name of this demonic image, its significance is spelled by the relationship of animal to human - the dominance of one over the other - and by the deity's attributes.

Wang is much more cautious in his understanding of cong imagery. According to him "many interpretations have been offered for these faces, but we have no evidence by which to choose one over another. In the absence of written evidence from the Liangzhu culture, speculation about symbolic meaning seems fruitless". Similarly, at the official museum site we can read that: "There is no consensus on the function of the cong, although most scholars believe that it was used as a religious instrument for communication with Heaven".

In 2002 royal jade cong was listed by State Administration of Cultural Heritage as one of sixty-four first-grade cultural relics that are forbidden to be taken out of mainland China for exhibition.

== Bibliography ==
- Childs-Johnson, Elizabeth (2020). "Chapter 4: The Jade Age Revisited, ca. 3500-200 BCE". In Childs-Johnson, Elizabeth (ed.). The Oxford Handbook of Early China. Oxford University Press. pp. 101–117. ISBN 9780197523247.
- Qin, Ling (2013). "Chapter 28: The Liangzhu culture". In Underhill, Anne P. (ed.). A Companion to Chinese Archaeology. John Wiley & Sons. pp. 574–596. doi:10.1002/9781118325698.ch28. ISBN 978-1-118-32572-8.
- Wang, Haicheng (2020). "Chapter 20: Art". In Goldin, Paul R. (ed.). Routledge Handbook of Early Chinese History. Routledge. pp. 425–458. ISBN 978-0-367-58066-7.
