= China Museum of Southern Water Town Culture =

- 中国江南水乡文化博物馆
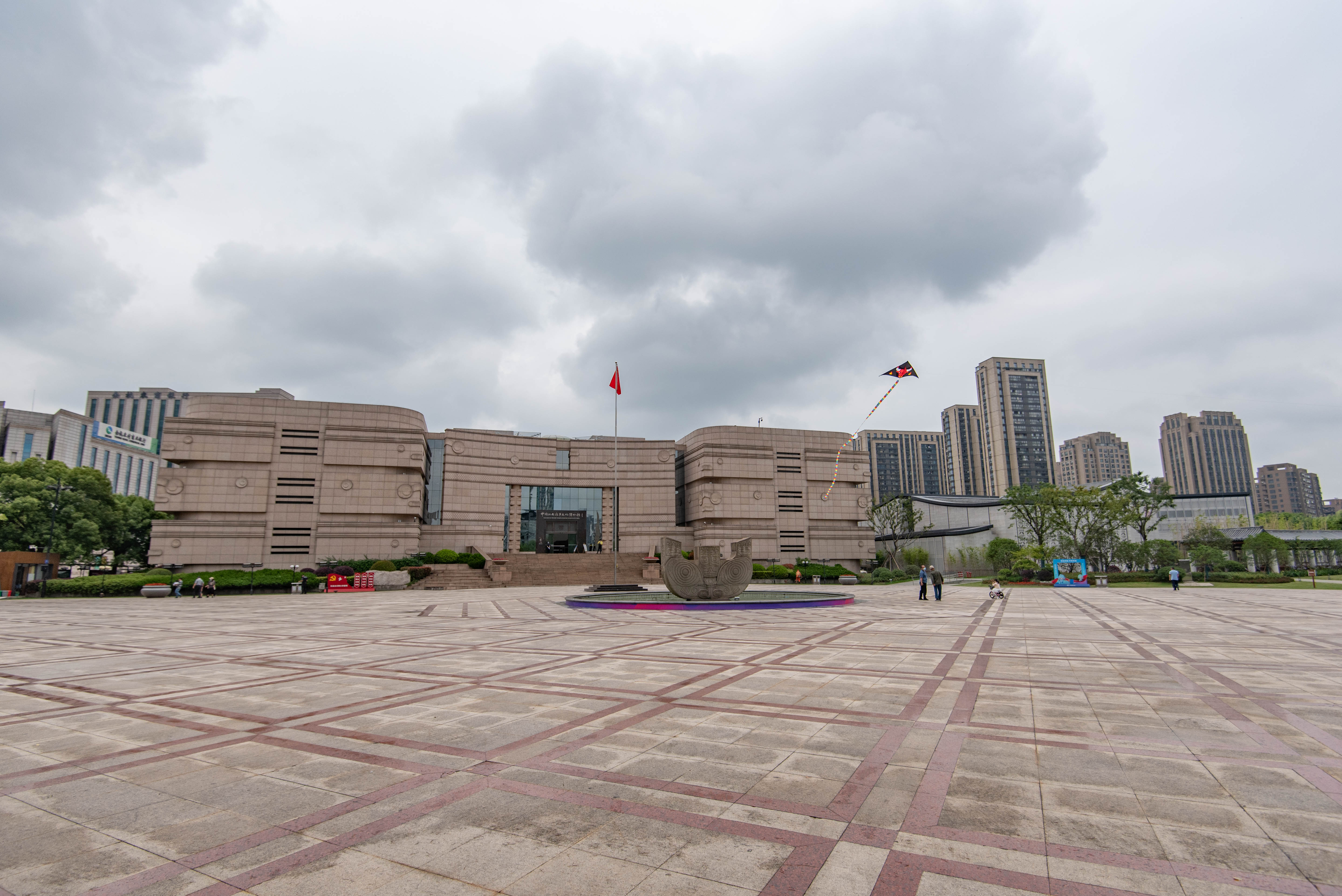
- West and East Building in 2022
- Former name: Yuhang Museum
- Established: 2003; 23 years ago
- Location: Nanyang subdistrict, Linping, Hangzhou, China
- Coordinates: 30.4172°N 120.3018°E
- Type: Local history museum

The China Museum of Southern Water Town Culture or the China Jiangnan Water Town Culture Museum, also known as the Linping Museum, is located in Linping district of Hangzhou, China. It is a museum that reflects local history, showcasing the culture and folk customs of water towns in Jiangnan, with a focus on Liangzhu culture.

== History ==
The museum officially opened to the public on 27 December 2003, and has been designated as a state-owned second-class museum by the National Cultural Heritage Administration. Previously known as the Yuhang Museum, it underwent renovations starting in 2017. Following the administrative reorganisation of Hangzhou in 2021, it became part of Linping district and reopened in May 2022 as Linping Museum.

== Collections ==
The museum has a building area of 8,000 square metres (86,000 sq ft) and houses nearly 10,000 artefacts, including stone tools, jade items, ceramics, and calligraphy and paintings. Among these are 31 first-class items, 174 second-class items, and 582 third-class items. The museum holds two exhibitions, one focused on local history, the other on the culture of Chinese water towns.

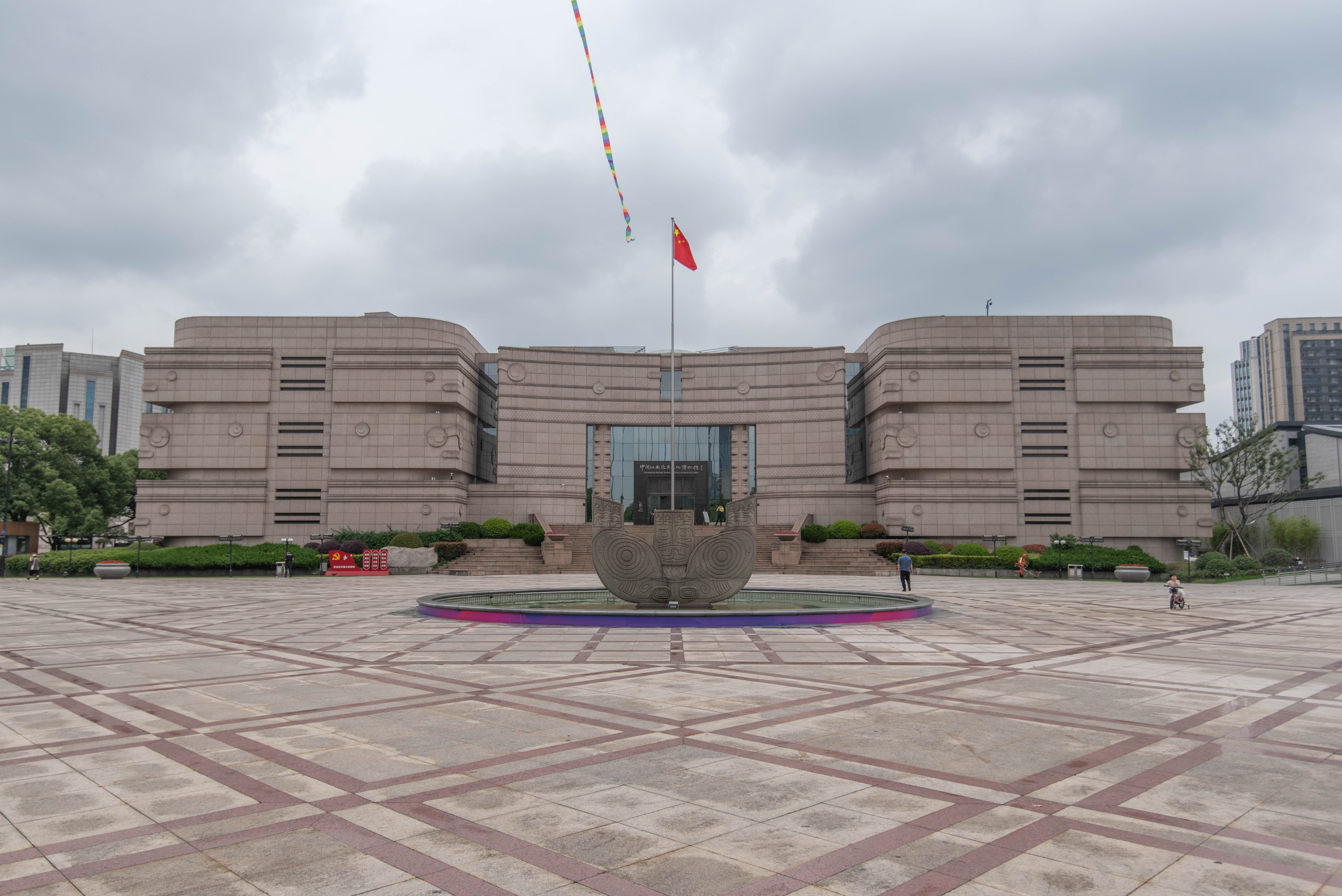
West Building

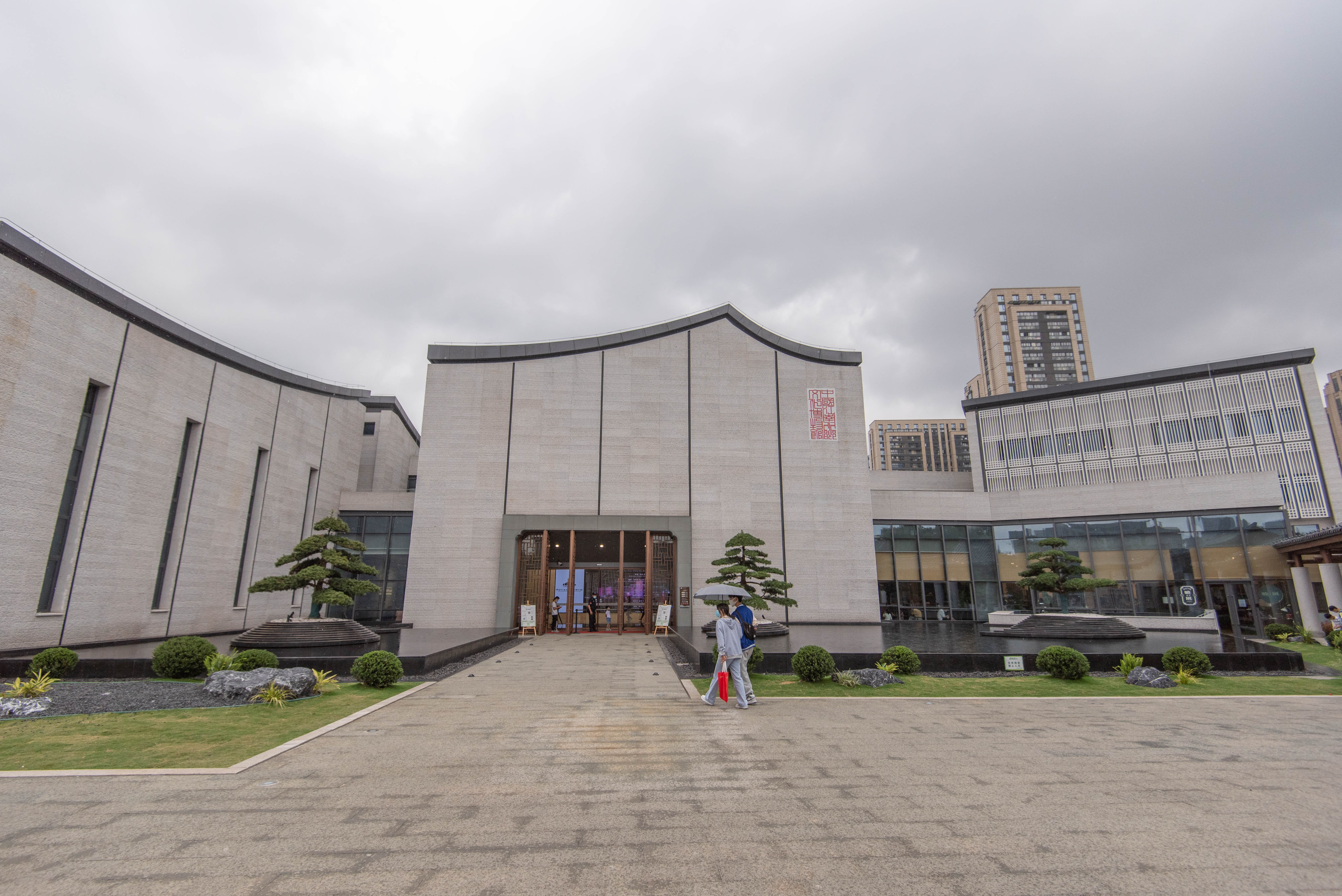
East Building

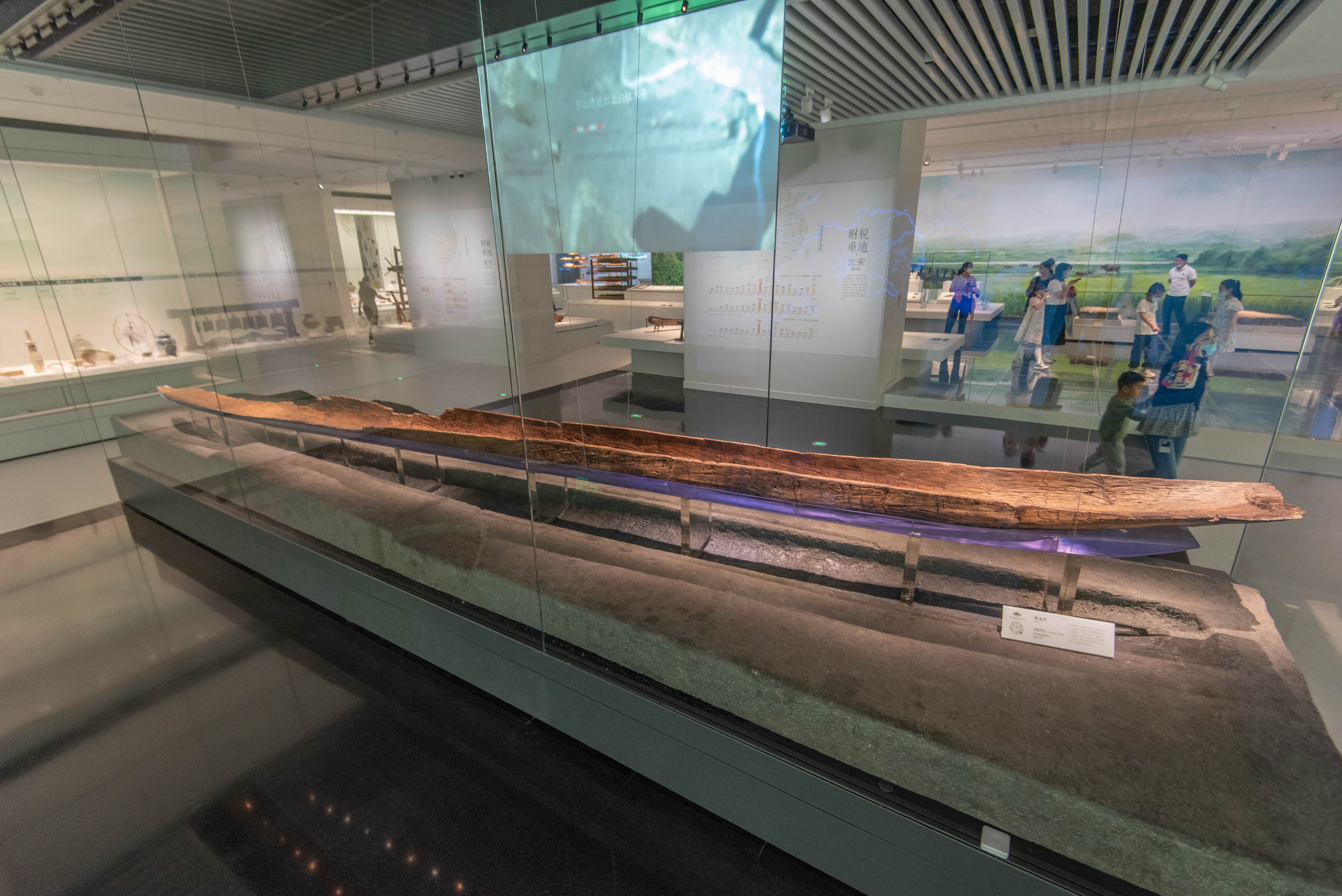
A dugout canoe excavated from the Maoshan site in Linping

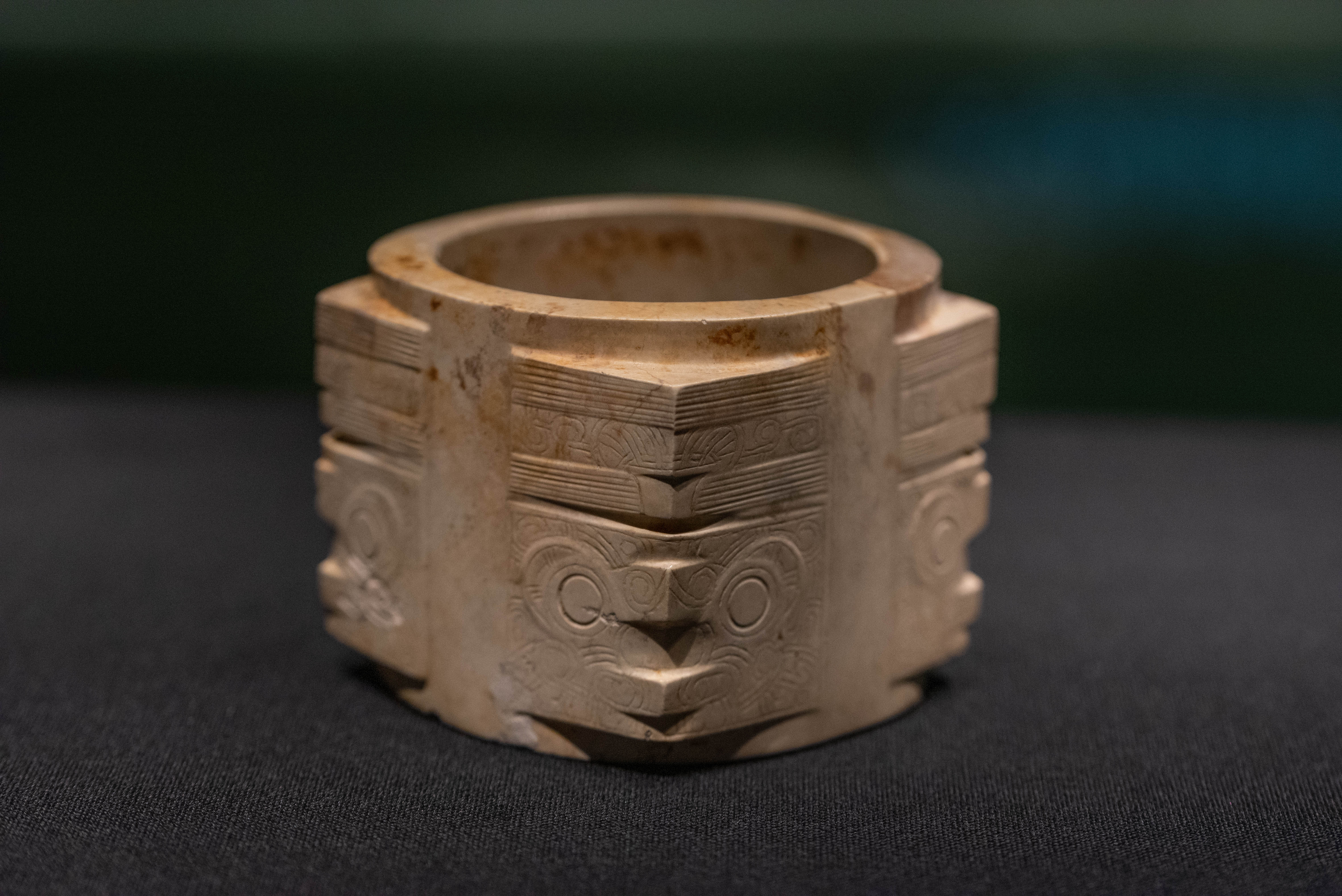
A jade cong excavated from the Yaoshan site in Yuhang

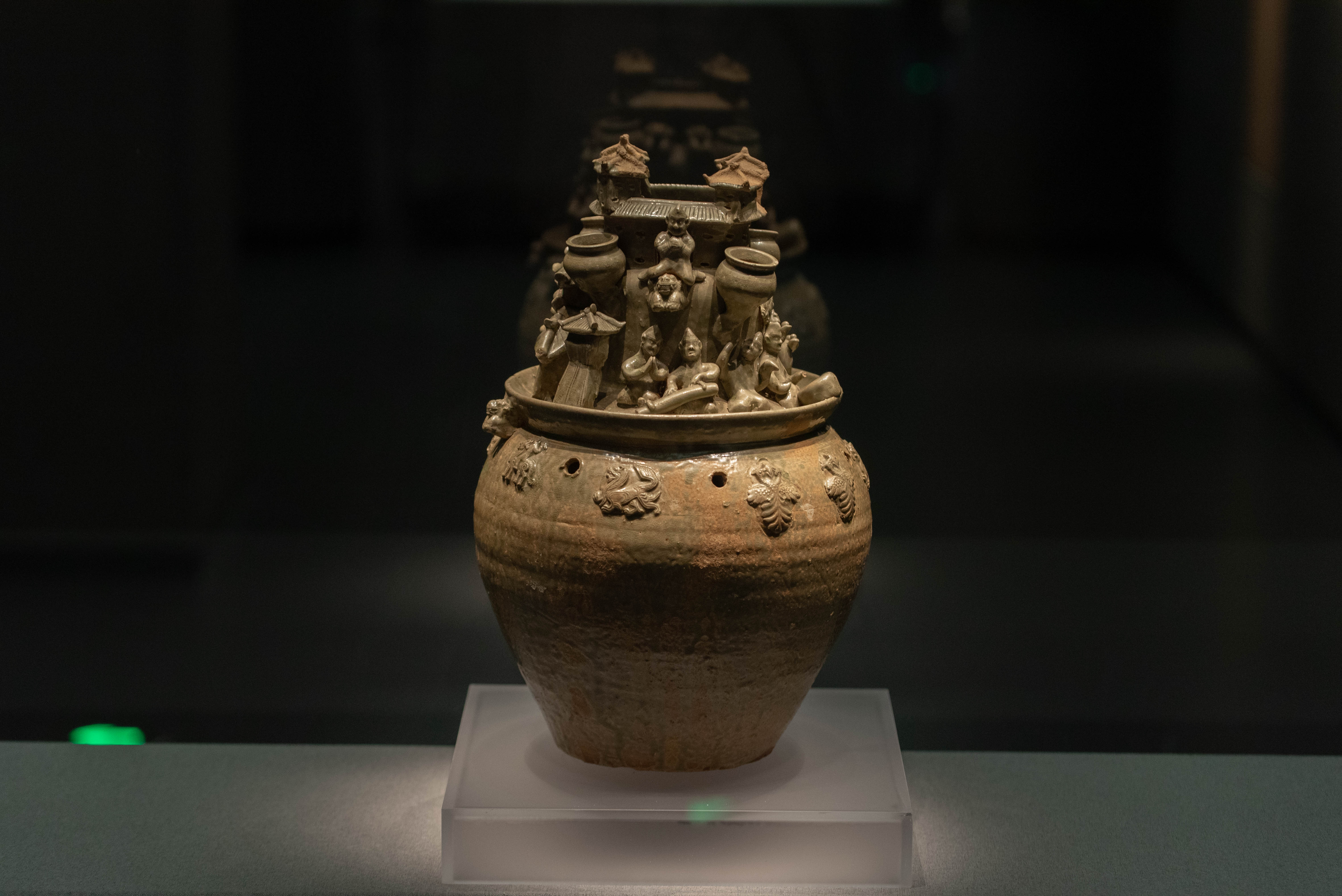
Western Jin dynasty moulded jar

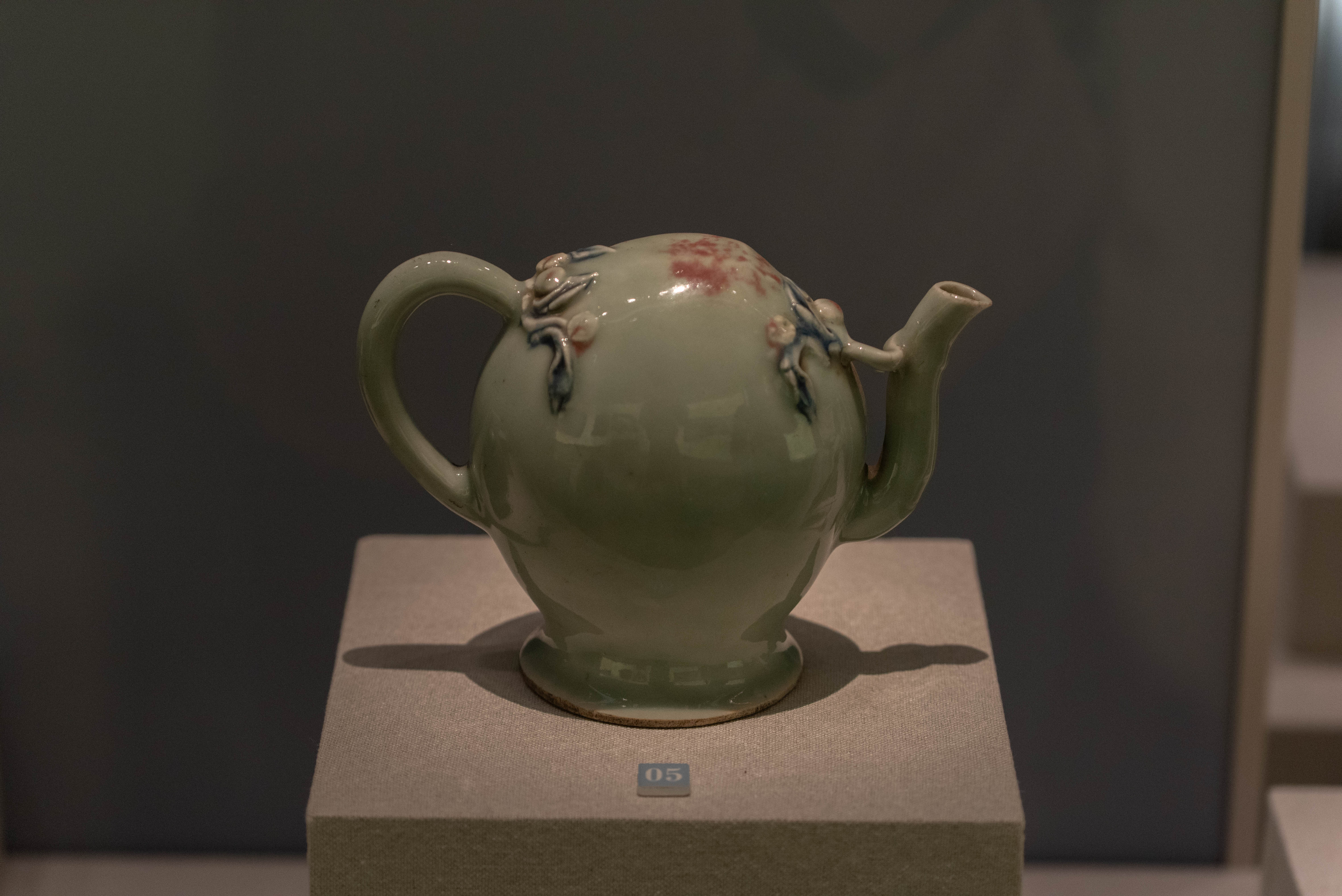
Peach-shaped celadon pot
