= Cong (vessel) =

Form of ancient Chinese jade artifact

External videos
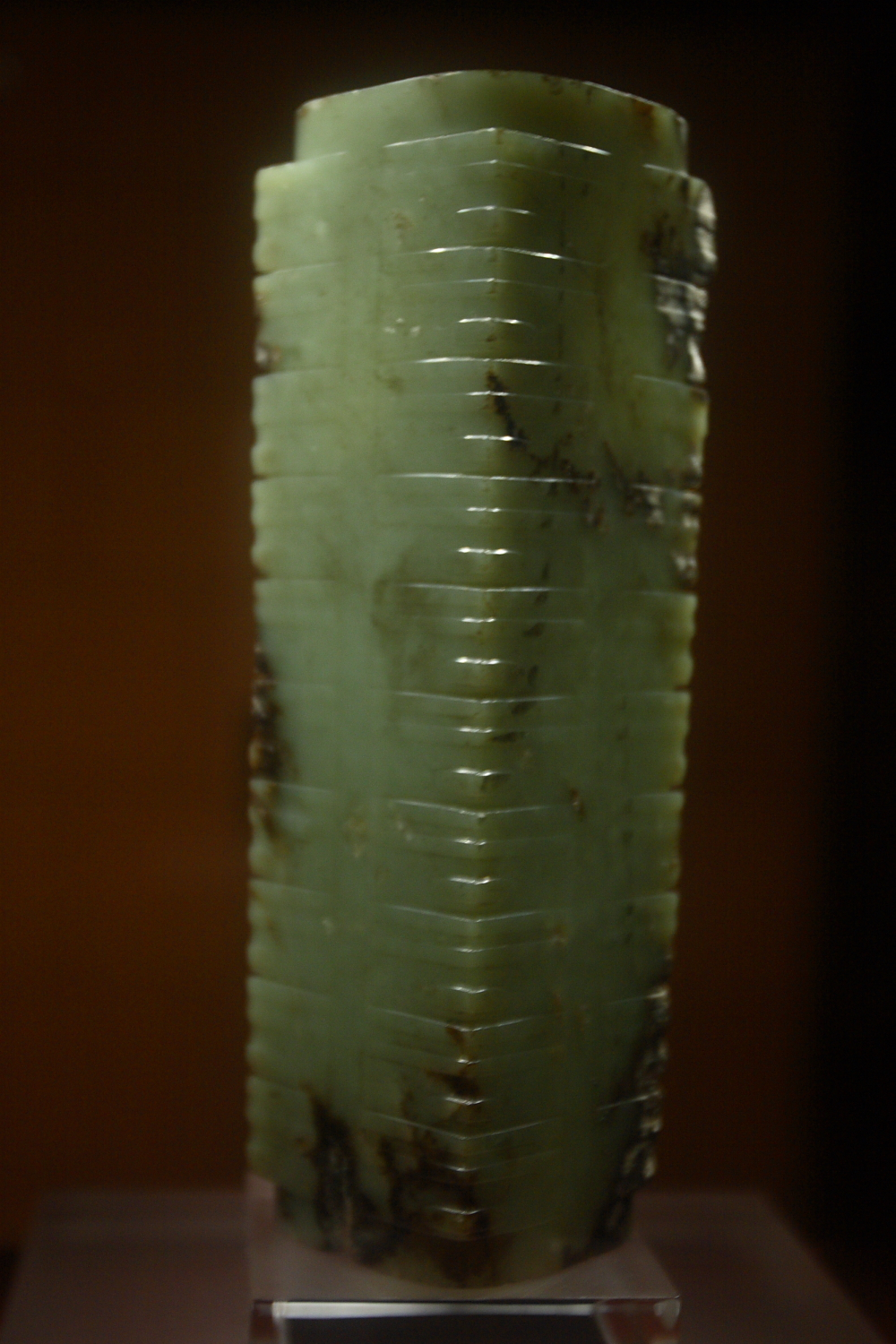
- Jade Cong, Smarthistory

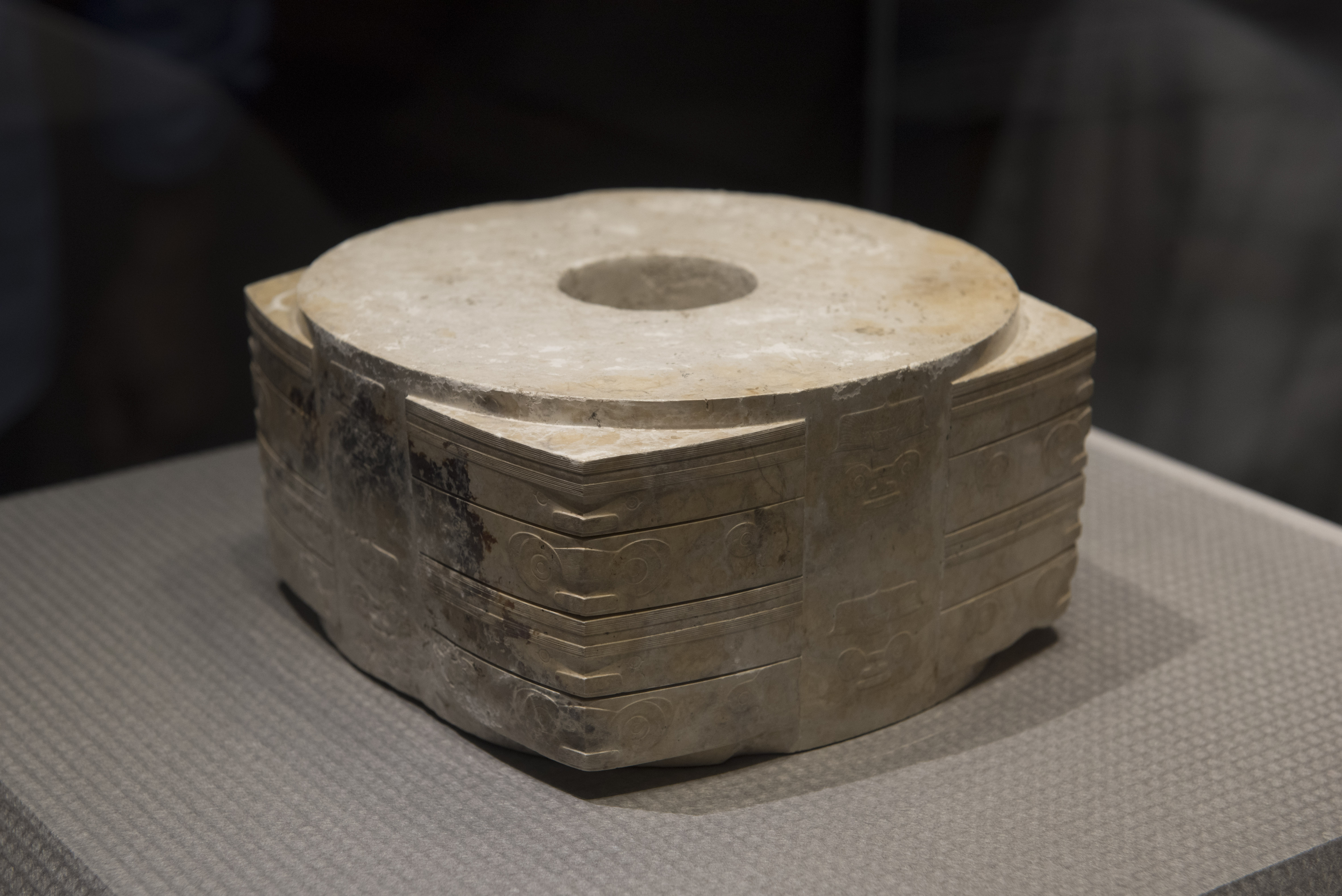
Royal Jade cong from the Liangzhu culture. Zhejiang Provincial Museum

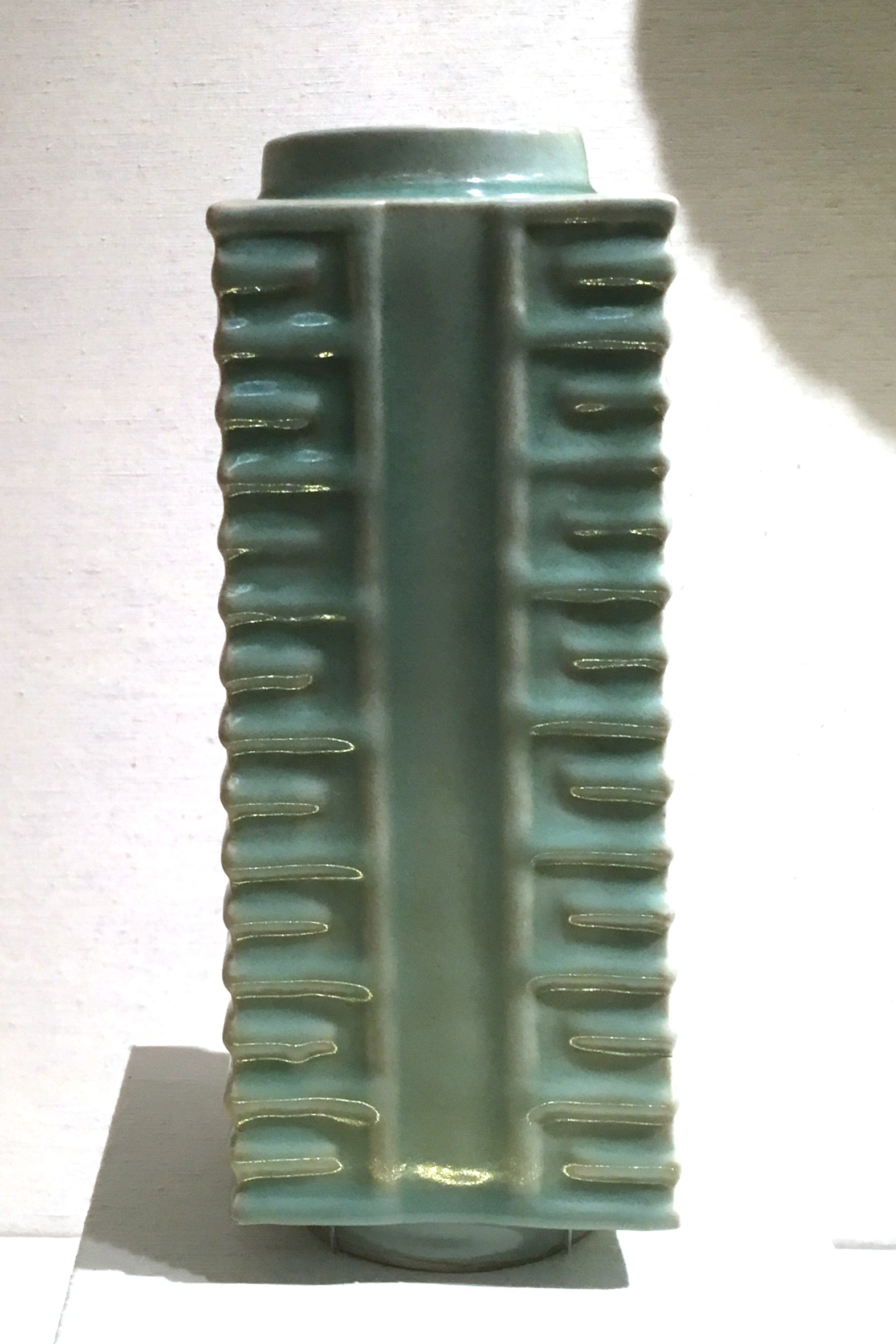
Longquan celadon cong, 12th–13th century

A cong (Chinese: 琮; pinyin: cóng; Wade–Giles: ts'ung^{2}) is a form of ancient Chinese jade artifact. Cong are objects with a square cross-section pierced with an axial circular hole. It was later also used in ceramics.

== History ==
The earliest cong were produced by the Xuejiagang culture and the Liangzhu culture (3400–2250 BC); later examples date mainly from the Shang and Zhou dynasties.

Interest in the jade shape developed during the 12th–13th century Song dynasty. The shape continued to be used in ceramic and metalwork for centuries.

== Description ==
A cong is a straight tube with a circular bore and square outer section with more or less convex sides. The outer surface is divided vertically or horizontally such that the whole defines a hollow cylinder embedded in a partial rectangular block. Proportions vary: a cong may be squat or taller than it is wide. The outer faces are sometimes decorated with mask-like faces, which may be related to the taotie designs found on later bronze vessels.

Although it is generally considered to be a ritual object of some sort, the original function and meaning of the cong are unknown. Later writings speak of the cong as symbolizing the earth, while the bi represents the heavens. The square represents the earth and a circle represents the heavens.
