= Laohe Hill =

Hill in Hangzhou City, China

The Laohe Hill or Laoheshan (Chinese: 老和山) is a hill located in Hangzhou City, Zhejiang Province, People's Republic of China.

== Introduction ==
It is on the northwest corner of West Lake and on the Yuquan Campus, Zhejiang University. It has an altitude of 156 meters and is covered by forests.

In 1936, at the foot of the hill, a very large neolithic site was discovered (mainly Liangzhu culture), so it's a very famous historic site of Hangzhou.

Laohe Hill is a literature topic often appearing in essays or poems by people who have visited Hangzhou and climbed it.
