= Hangzhou–Jiaxing–Huzhou Plain =

Plain in Zhejiang, China

The Hangzhou–Jiaxing–Huzhou Plain, or Hangjiahu Plain (Chinese: 杭嘉湖平原; pinyin: Háng–Jiā–Hú Píngyuán) is the largest plain in Zhejiang province, and is an integral part of the Yangtze Delta. Comprising an area of 7,620 square kilometres (2,940 square miles), it is bound by Lake Tai to the north, the Qiantang River / Hangzhou Bay to the south, and Tianmu Mountain to the west. It includes all of the prefecture-level city of Jiaxing, most of Huzhou, and the northeastern part of Hangzhou.

== Geography ==
The plain has a humid subtropical climate (Köppen Cfa), influenced by the East Asian Monsoon, with cool winters and very hot and humid summers. The topography is generally low-lying and flat, at around 3 metres (9.8 feet) elevation, though slightly higher to the south and east and lower sloping towards Lake Tai. Its river and canal network, including the Grand Canal itself, at 12.7 km per km^{2} (20.4 mi per sq. mi.), is the densest in all of China. From the 1960s to the 2000s, declining aquifer levels from continual groundwater extraction have caused some of the strongest land subsidence in China.
