= Liangzhu culture =

Neolithic jade culture in the Yangtze River Delta

- Geographical range: Jiangsu, Shanghai, & Zhejiang in China
- Period: Neolithic China
- Dates: 3300–2300 BC
- Preceded by: Songze culture, Hemudu culture
- Followed by: Maqiao culture

Chinese name
- Chinese: 良渚文化
Transcriptions
Standard Mandarin
- Hanyu Pinyin: Liángzhǔ Wénhuà

The Liangzhu (/ˈljɑːŋˈdʒuː/) culture or civilization (3300–2300 BC) was the last Chinese Neolithic jade culture in the Yangtze River Delta. The culture was highly stratified, as jade, silk, ivory and lacquer artifacts were found exclusively in elite burials, while pottery was more commonly found in the burial plots of poorer individuals. This division of class indicates that the Liangzhu period was an early state, symbolized by the clear distinction drawn between social classes in funeral structures. A pan-regional urban center had emerged at the Liangzhu site in northwestern Hangzhou, Zhejiang, and elite groups from this site presided over the local centers. The Liangzhu culture was extremely influential and its sphere of influence reached as far north as Shanxi and as far south as Guangdong. The primary Liangzhu site was perhaps among the oldest Neolithic sites in East Asia that would be considered a state society. The type site at Liangzhu was discovered in Yuhang County, Zhejiang and initially excavated by Shi Xingeng in 1936.

On 6 July 2019, the archaeological ruins of Liangzhu City were inscribed as a UNESCO World Heritage Site.

== Disappearance ==
The Liangzhu culture flourished around 2500 BC, but disappeared from the Taihu Lake area after around 2300 BC. Almost no traces of the culture were found from the following years in this area.

Recent research has shown that rising waters interrupted the development of human settlements several times in this area. This led researchers to conclude the demise of the Liangzhu culture was brought about by extreme environmental changes such as floods, as the cultural layers are usually interrupted by muddy or marshy and sandy–gravelly layers with buried paleo trees. An alternative scenario proposes that extremely heavy monsoon rains during this period resulted in massive flooding which destroyed dams and the culture's settlements. This theory was backed by a study in 2021, suggesting that a decades-long period of high precipitation (between 4345 ± 32 years and 4324 ± 30 years B.P.), probably caused by increased frequency of El Niño–Southern Oscillation conditions, coincided with the disappearance of the culture. The researchers stated that "massive rainfall in the entire middle-lower reaches of the Yangtze River Valley might have induced fluvial flooding and/or overbank marine flooding transported by the Yangtze River plume and thus impeded human habitation and rice farming. Massive flooding and inundation due to poor drainage in the low-lying land may have forced the Liangzhu people to abandon their capital city and dwellings in the Taihu Plain, ultimately leading to the collapse of the entire Liangzhu civilization." This may have all occurred during, or in the century leading up to the global drought that is credited with bringing down most of the first generation of human civilizations, including those in the Indus Valley, Old Kingdom Egypt, and the Akkadian Empire in Sumeria.

== City-building and agriculture ==
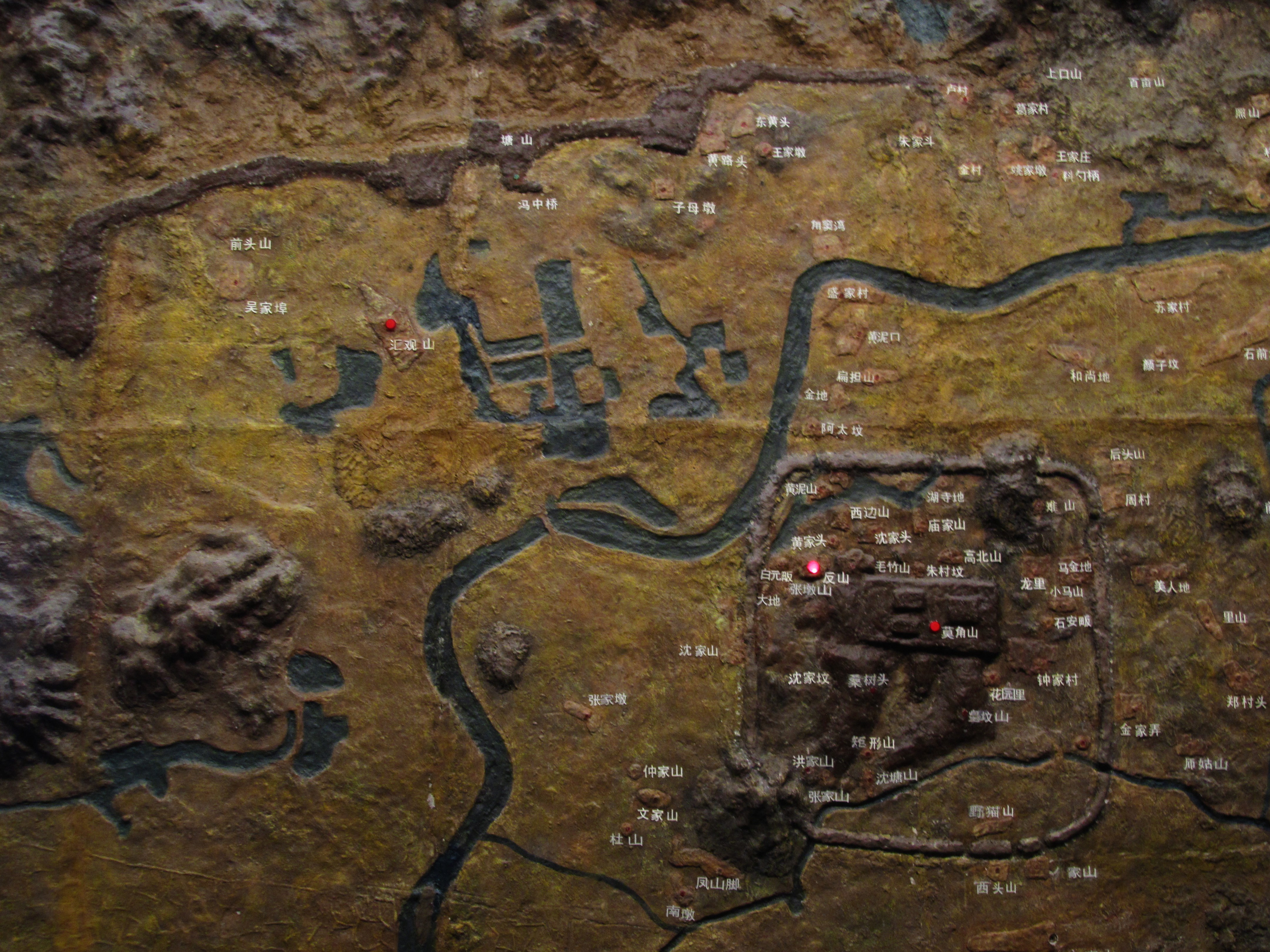
Model of Liangzhu city

The culture possessed advanced agriculture, including irrigation, paddy rice cultivation and aquaculture. Houses were often constructed on stilts, on rivers or shorelines.

A new discovery of ancient city wall base relics was announced by the Zhejiang provincial government on November 29, 2007. It was concluded that the site was the center of the Liangzhu culture. A new Liangzhu Culture Museum was completed in 2008 and opened late in the year.

The Liangzhu Ancient City is located in a wetland environment on the plain of river networks between Daxiong Mountain and Dazhe Mountain of the Tianmu Mountain Range. This ancient city is said to be the largest city during this time period. Its interior area is 290 hectares, surrounded by clay walls which had six city gates. Two gates were located in the north, east and south walls. At its center was a confirmed palace site called the Mojiaoshan complex that spanned 30 hectares and there was also evidence of an artificial flood protection design implemented within the city. Both of these constructions are said to be indicators of the social complexity developing in Liangzhu at the time. A granary may have been in place containing up to 15,000 kg of rice grain.

Liangzhu culture and other contemporary cultures c. 3000 BC

There are numerous waterway entrances both inside and outside of the city, linking it to the river networks. Inside the city were artificial earth mounds and natural hills. Outside of the walled area, remains are found for 700 hectares, the residences are said to be built in an urban planning system. 8 kilometers to the north various dam-like sites were found and are speculated to be an ancient flood protection system. Also discovered inside and outside the city are a large number of utensils for production, living, military and ritual purposes represented by numerous delicate Liangzhu jade wares of cultural profoundness; the remains including city walls, foundations of large structures, tombs, altars, residences, docks and workshops. The Liangzhu city-site is said to have been settled and developed with a specific purpose in mind since this area has very few remains that can be traced back to earlier periods.

A typical Liangzhu community, of which there are over 300 found so far, chose to live near rivers. Boats and oars have been recovered, which indicates proficiency with boats and watercraft. A Liangzhu site has provided the remains of a wooden pier and an embankment thought to have been used for protection against floods. Houses were raised on wood also to help against flooding, although houses on higher ground included semi-subterranean houses with thatched roofs. Well technology at the Miaoqian site during this period was similar to that of the earlier Hemudu period. The Liangzhu culture is said to have been more socially developed and complex than northern contemporaries in the Han Valley.

== Artifacts and technology ==
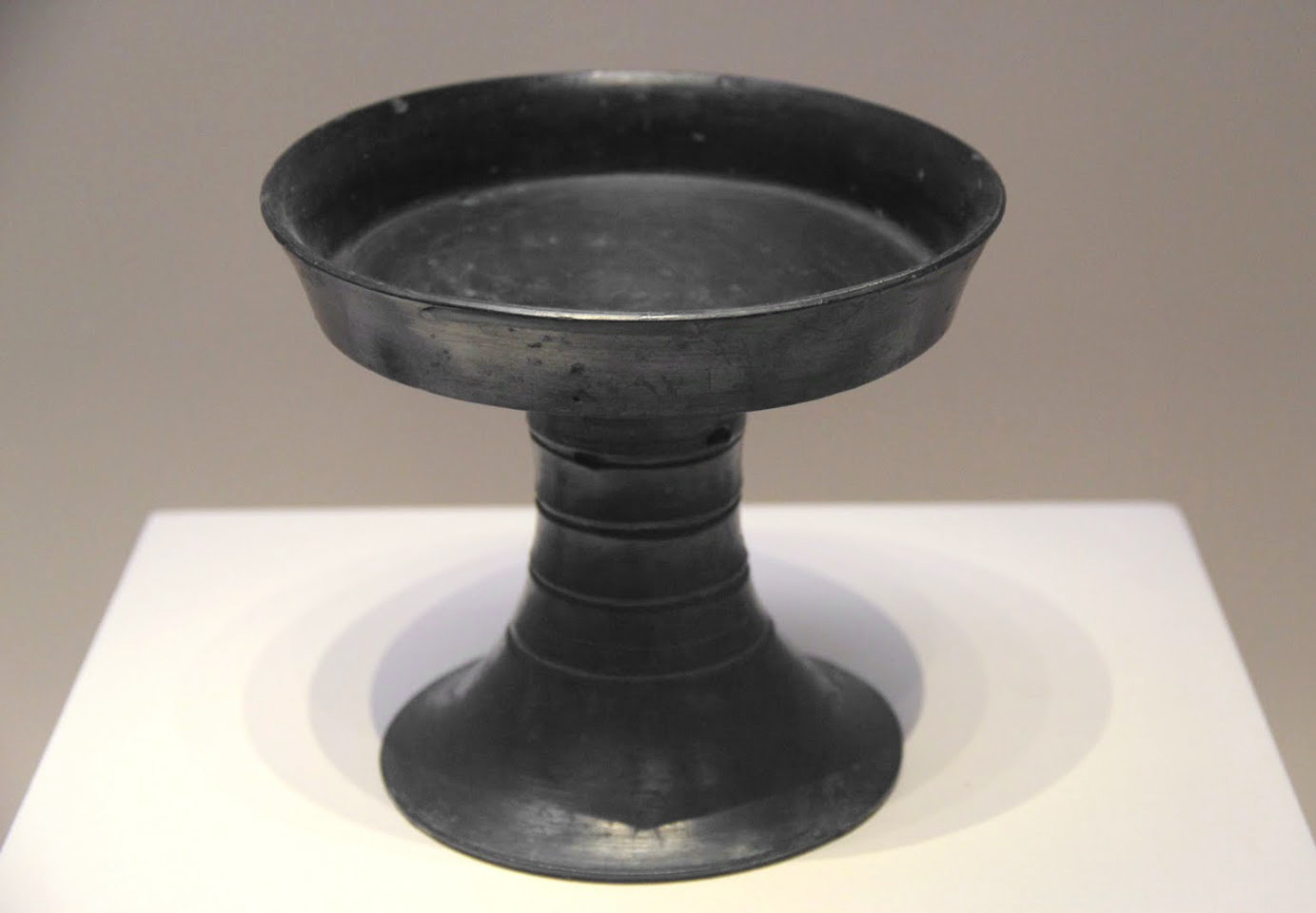
Neolithic pottery dou, Liangzhu Culture, Zhejiang, 1955. National Museum of China, Beijing

The inhabitants of Liangzhu sites used artifact designs of "bent knee" shaped adze handles, stone untangled adzes, art styles emphasizing the use of spirals and circles, cord-marking of pottery, pottery pedestals with cut-out decorations, baked clay spindle whorls, stone harvesting knives and spear points. Pottery was often decorated with a red slip. These artifacts are also common in later Neolithic Southeast Asia and the technological and economic toolkits of these societies possibly developed in the Neolithic Yangtze River area. Some of the Liangzhu pottery is reminiscent of the Shandong Longshan black "eggshell" style, however most differed and were a soft-fired gray with a black or red slip. There has also been evidence of tremolite particles being used as an ingredient for crafting some of the black "eggshell" pottery. It was determined that the black color of the pottery resulted from similar advancements in carburization and firing processes. Similarities between Liangchengzhen, the largest Dawenkou site, pottery making process and that of the Liangzhu were noted, which led researchers to believe there was communication between the two cultures. The Guangfulin site showed influence from more northern cultures but also had pottery practices very similar to that of the typical Liangzhu sites.

Researchers have found that some of the axes at Liangzhu sites were crafted using diamond tools. The inhabitants of Liangzhu, using these tools, worked corundum into ceremonial axes. The axes were said to "have been polished to a mirrorlike luster". The techniques they used generated results that are said to be difficult to replicate even with modern technology. This is the earliest known use of diamond tools worldwide, thousands of years earlier than the gem is known to have been used elsewhere. The researchers also note that this is the only prehistoric culture known to work sapphire.

== Jade work ==
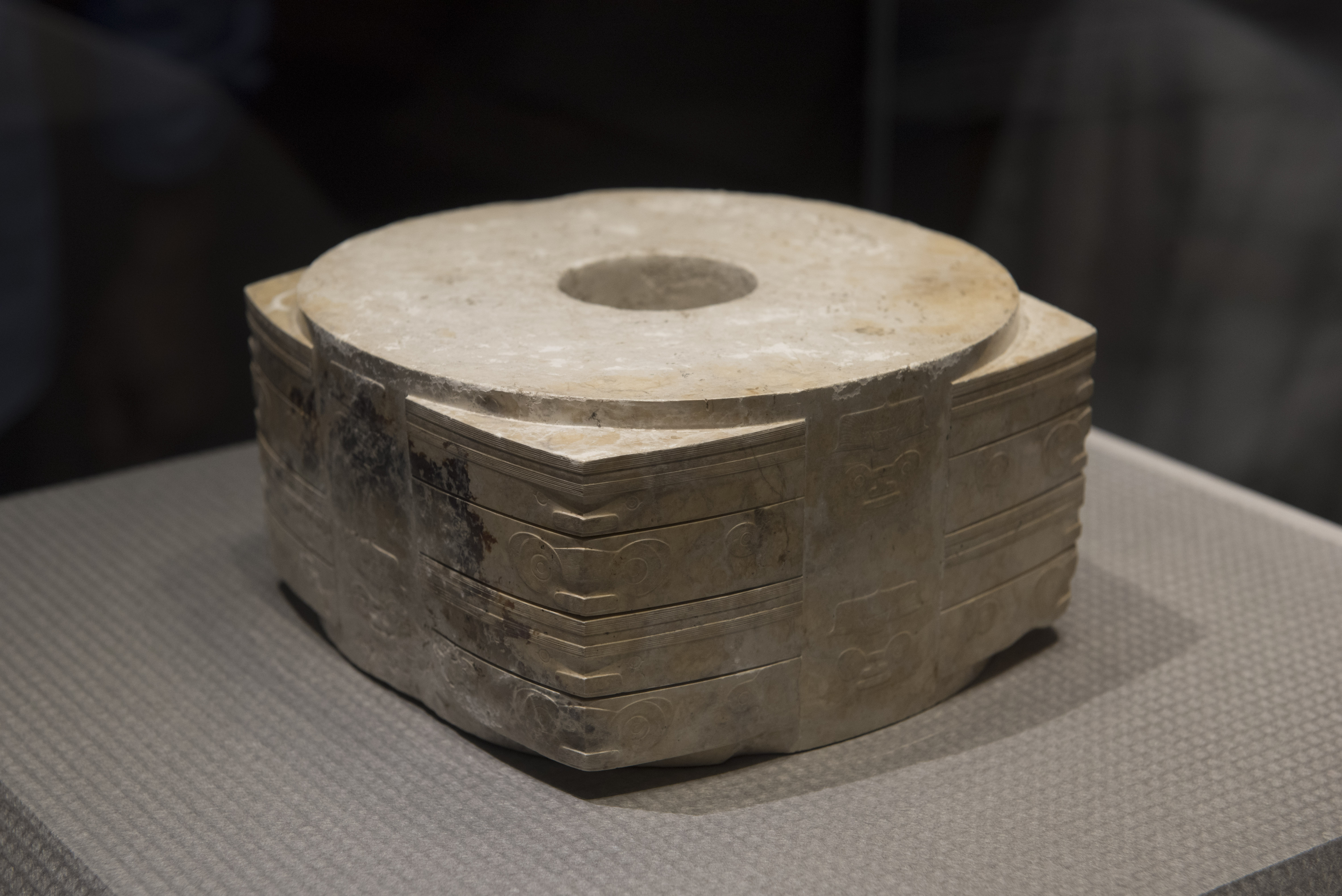
Royal Jade cong - probably the most famous artifact of Liangzhu culture. Zhejiang Provincial Museum

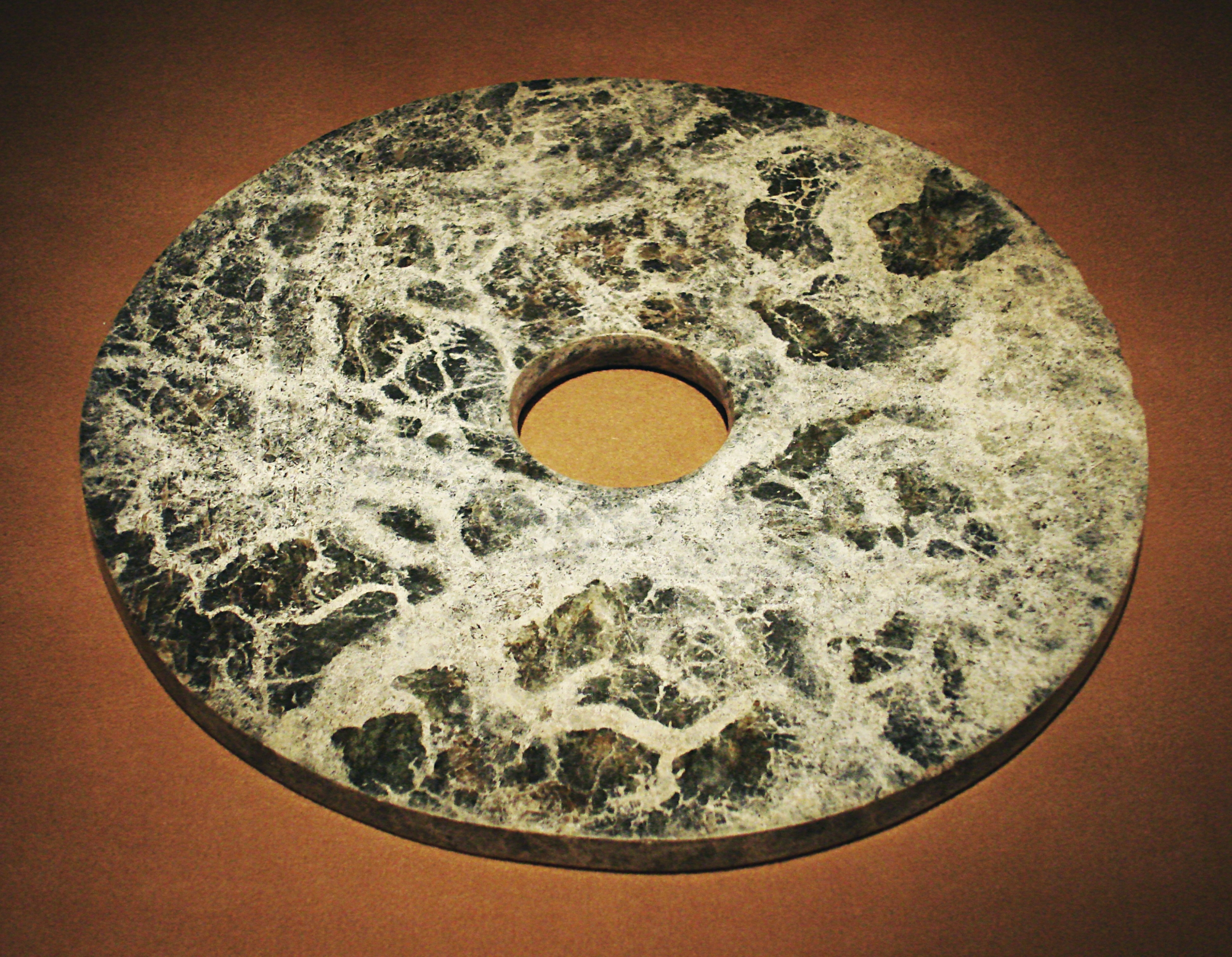
Jade bi from the Liangzhu culture. The ritual object is a symbol of wealth and military power.

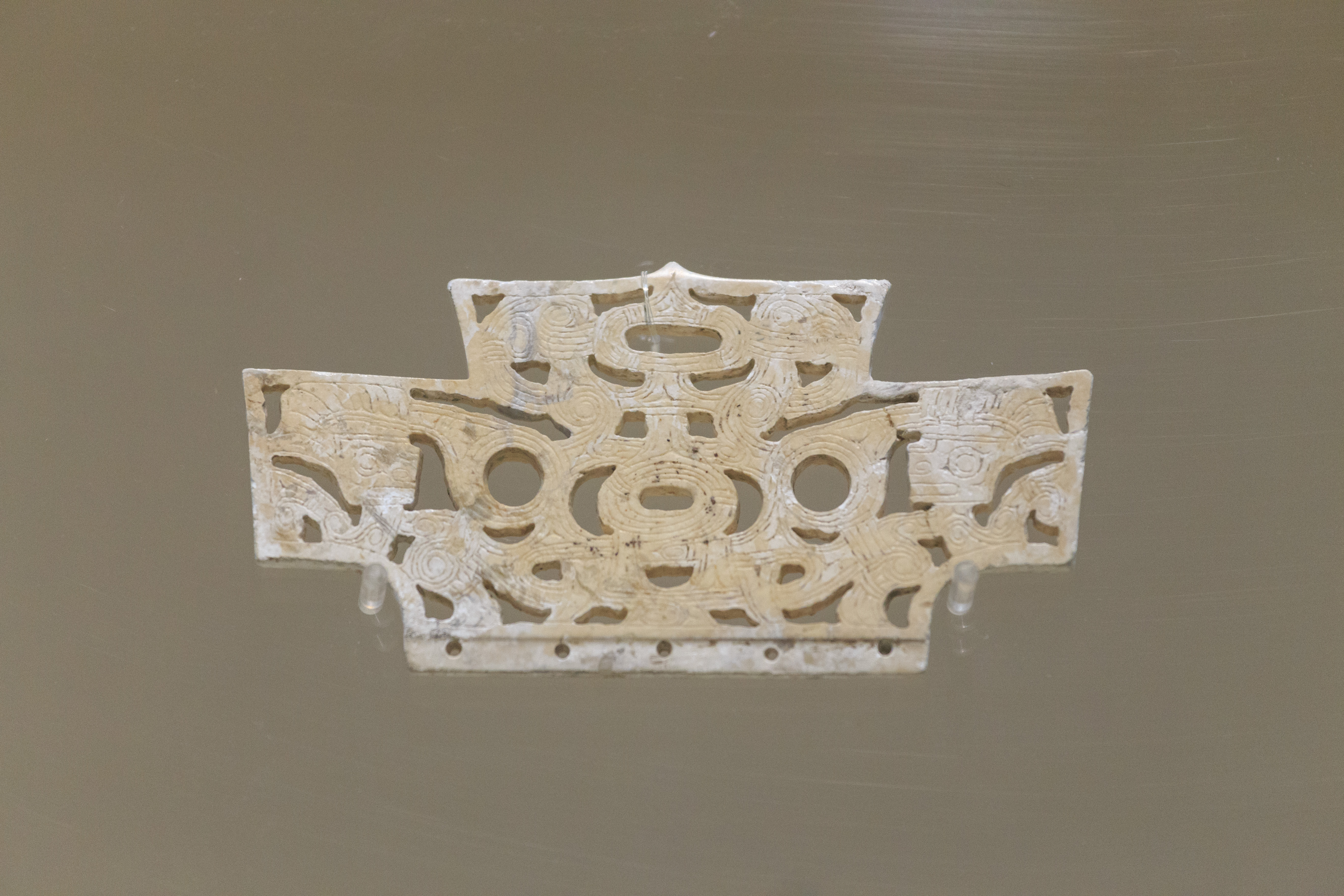
Jade bi from the Liangzhu culture

The jade from this culture is characterized by finely worked large ritual jades, commonly incised with the taotie motif. The most exemplary artifacts from the culture were its cong (cylinders), with the largest discovered weighing 3.5 kg. Bi (discs) and Yue axes (ceremonial axes) were also found. Jade pendants were also found, designed with engraved representations of small birds, turtles and fish. Many Liangzhu jade artefacts had a white milky bone-like aspect due to its tremolite rock origin and influence of water-based fluids at the burial sites, although jade made from actinolite and serpentine were also commonly found. Most of Liangzhu's contemporaries have some jades, but 90 per cent of all the cong and bi jades recovered, and by far the best in quality, are from Liangzhu sites. Jade artifacts unearthed from Liangzhu sites are said to have been influential on the development of other neolithic cultures in China: "The impactful legacy of Liangzhu Culture is seen in Longshan in Shandong, Taosi in Shanxi, Qijia in Ganqing and many other sites in northern Shaanxi, where cong tubes, bi disks and other jade objects reminiscent of Liangzhu Culture have been unearthed." Liangzhu jade work is also said to have had a lasting influence on ritual objects in later periods of Chinese culture.

The Liangzhu "ancient city" or Liangzhu site-complex controlled the best jade products, but less important centers also produced elite crafts, which led researchers to believe the Liangzhu culture was not a simple pyramid structure society in terms of status levels. Many minor centers had access to their own jade (nephrite). However, the Liangzhu elites at the ancient city communicated and exchanged goods with elites from other parts of the Liangzhu world (and also in other regions of Longshan-era China) and set the criteria of what jade should look like. The Liangzhu did not seem to be importers of jade, even though they did export it extensively.

== Religion ==
A Neolithic altar from the Liangzhu culture, excavated at Yaoshan in Zhejiang was elaborate, made of carefully positioned piles of stones and rock walls: this implies that religion was of considerable importance. The altar has three levels, the highest being a platform of rammed earth. Three additional platforms were paved with cobblestones. There are the remains of a stone wall. On the altar are twelve graves in two rows. Some scholars claim that ritual sacrifice of slaves was part of the Liangzhu tradition.

== Genetic studies ==
Annotated version of PCA of ancient and modern-day East Asians, with Liangzhu samples in light blue

A 2007 analysis of the DNA recovered from human remains in archeological sites of prehistoric peoples along the Yangtze River shows high frequencies of Haplogroup O1-M119 (Y-DNA) at Liangzhu culture sites of Maqiao and Xindili. This links them to modern day eastern or coastal Han Chinese and to the Austronesian and Kra–Dai peoples.

The prevalence of O-M119 is high in Zhejiang, Jiangsu, Fujian and Guangdong. It reaches its highest prevalence in Zhejiang and Jiangsu. According to a study published by Shi Yan, et al. in the European Journal of Human Genetics in 2011, the frequency of O-M119 reaches 22% in Eastern China. According to Sun Jin in the American Journal of Biological Anthropology, the prevalence of O-M119 reaches 24% in Jiangsu and 20% in Shanghai, and O-M119 is one of the founding paternal lineages of the Han people.

A third of male university students in Hangzhou and Shanghai presented with the O-M119 haplotype. According to 23Mofang, Chinese geneticists have identified O-M119, in particular, the Liangzhu culture subclade Y-O1a1a1a1a1a1a (Y-F656) as the haplotype of King Gou Jian of Yue and the famous scholar Sima Guang.

The Liangzhu culture existed in coastal areas around the mouth of the Yangtze. Haplogroup O1-M119 was absent in other Liangzhu culture sites inland. The authors of the study suggest that this may be evidence of two different human migration routes during the peopling of Eastern Asia, one coastal and the other inland, with little genetic flow between them.

A 2024 study states that haplogroup O1a-M119 has high frequency in Taiwanese Austronesians compared to Austronesians from Southeast Asian islands.

A 2025 autosomal DNA paper on Neolithic Chinese samples found that samples from the ancient Liangzhu site were intermediate between modern-day Yangtze Delta Han Chinese from Jiangsu and Zhejiang, modern-day Tai-Kradai speakers, and modern-day Austronesian speakers from Taiwan and the Philippines. The study also found that the ancient Liangzhu inhabitants were closer to Neolithic Fujian samples (notably the Early Neolithic Qihe from Zhangping) than to modern-day Austronesian speakers.

== See also ==
- Liangzhu Culture Museum
- List of Neolithic cultures of China
- Three Sovereigns and Five Emperors
