= Zhejiang Provincial Museum =

Museum in Hangzhou, China

Zhejiang Provincial Museum Zhejiang Memorial Museum of Revolutionary History
- 浙江省博物馆; 浙江革命历史纪念馆
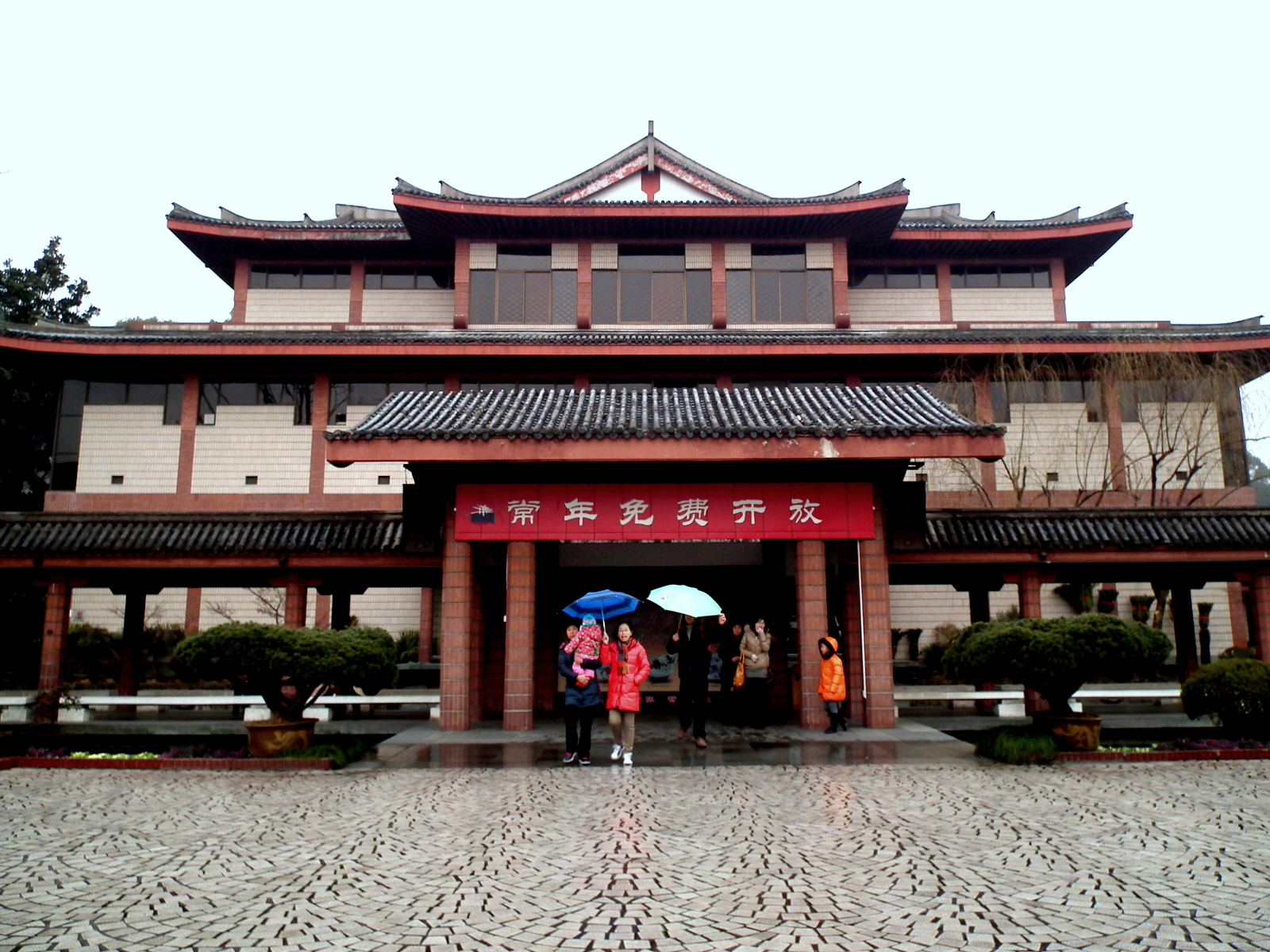
- Gushan building
- Former name: West Lake Museum; Zhejiang Museum
- Established: 1929
- Location: Hangzhou, Zhejiang, China
- Coordinates: 30°15′12″N 120°08′19″E
- Type: Provincial museum
- Collection size: 100,000 pieces
- Website: zhejiangmuseum.com; zjmuex.com

The Zhejiang Provincial Museum, also known as Zhejiang Memorial Museum of Revolutionary History, is the provincial museum of Zhejiang, China, located in Hangzhou. It was established in 1929 as the West Lake Museum on the Gushan Island in the West Lake. It houses over 100,000 items in its permanent collection.

== History ==
The museum as founded in December 1929 as the Zhejiang Provincial West Lake Museum, with the land of Wenlan Pavilion donated by the Zhejiang Provincial Government in December 1930. Since the Japanese invasion in 1937, the museum was relocated to multiple locations, until it dissolved in July 1941. In June 1943, it was re-established in Longquan in western Zhejiang, and returned to Hangzhou in the fall of 1945.

In 1951, the Ministry of Culture designated the museum as a local museum. In 1953, the museum was renamed as Zhejiang Museum. In 1957, Wu Changshuo Memorial Hall was built at Xiling Seal Society. In 1962, the museum added the title of Zhejiang Provincial Administration of Cultural Heritage, which was interrupted during the Cultural Revolution.

In 1976, the museum was renamed as the Zhejiang Provincial Museum. Zhejiang Provincial Administration of Cultural Heritage resumed and became independent of the museum. Zhejiang Provincial Institute of Archaeology was founded in May and separated from the museum in December. In 1983, a cultural heritage warehouse was built at Gudang. In 1984, the museum's natural science section became an independent museum named Zhejiang Museum of Natural History. In 1999, the museum built the West Lake Gallery.

On 22 December 2009, a new building was inaugurated on the West Lake Cultural Square near the Wulin Square, next to the Grand Canal. It has 7,600 square metres (82,000 sq ft) of display space, twice as much as the Gushan building. The Wulin Branch was closed in May 2023, following the opening of its Zhijiang Branch.

== Notable collections ==
The museum houses collections, including the Neolithic jade artefacts of Liangzhu culture, the Neolithic ivory carving of Hemudu culture, the Sword of Yue King Zhuji Yushi. It also holds The Remaining Mountain by Yuan dynasty painter Huang Gongwang, which is part of the larger painting Dwelling in the Fuchun Mountains, with the other half housed in the National Palace Museum in Taipei.

== See also ==
- List of museums in China
