= History of Jilin =

In ancient times Jilin was inhabited by various peoples, notably the Mohe and the Wùjí (勿吉). It also formed a part of the Goguryeo kingdom. The kingdom of Balhae was established in the area from 698 to 926 AD. The region then fell successively under the domination of the Khitan Liao dynasty, the Jurchen Jin dynasty, and the Mongol Yuan dynasty. During the Qing dynasty, much of the area was under the control of the General of Jilin, whose area of control extended to the Sea of Japan to encompass much of what is Russia's Primorsky Krai today. Immigration of Han Chinese was strictly controlled.

However, after the Primorsky Krai area was ceded to Russia in 1860, the Qing government began to open the area up to Han Chinese migrants, most of whom came from Shandong. By the beginning of the 20th century, Han Chinese had become the dominant ethnic group of the region. In 1932, the area was incorporated into Manchukuo, a puppet state set up by Japan, and Changchun (then called Xinjing), capital of Jilin today, was made the capital of Manchukuo. After the defeat of Japan in 1945, the region, together with the rest of northeastern China, was handed to the communists by the Soviet Union. Manchuria was then the staging ground from which the communists eventually conquered the rest of China (see Chinese Civil War#Post-war power struggle (1945–1947)).

In 1949, Jilin province was smaller, encompassing only the environs of Changchun and Jilin City, and the capital was at Jilin City, while Changchun was a municipality independent from the province. In the 1950s Jilin was expanded to its present borders. During the Cultural Revolution, Jilin was expanded again to include a part of Inner Mongolia, giving it a border with the independent state of Mongolia, though this was later reversed. In recent times Jilin has, together with the rest of heavy industry-based Northeast China, been facing economic difficulties with privatization. This has prompted the central government to undertake a campaign called “Revitalize the Northeast”.

== Institutions ==
The Jilin Provincial Museum was founded in Jilin City in 1951 and moved to Changchun with the transfer of the government's seat in 1954. In 2012, the museum was declared a national first-grade museum. The museum moved to its present location in Nanguan District in 2016.
