= Kaifeng Museum =

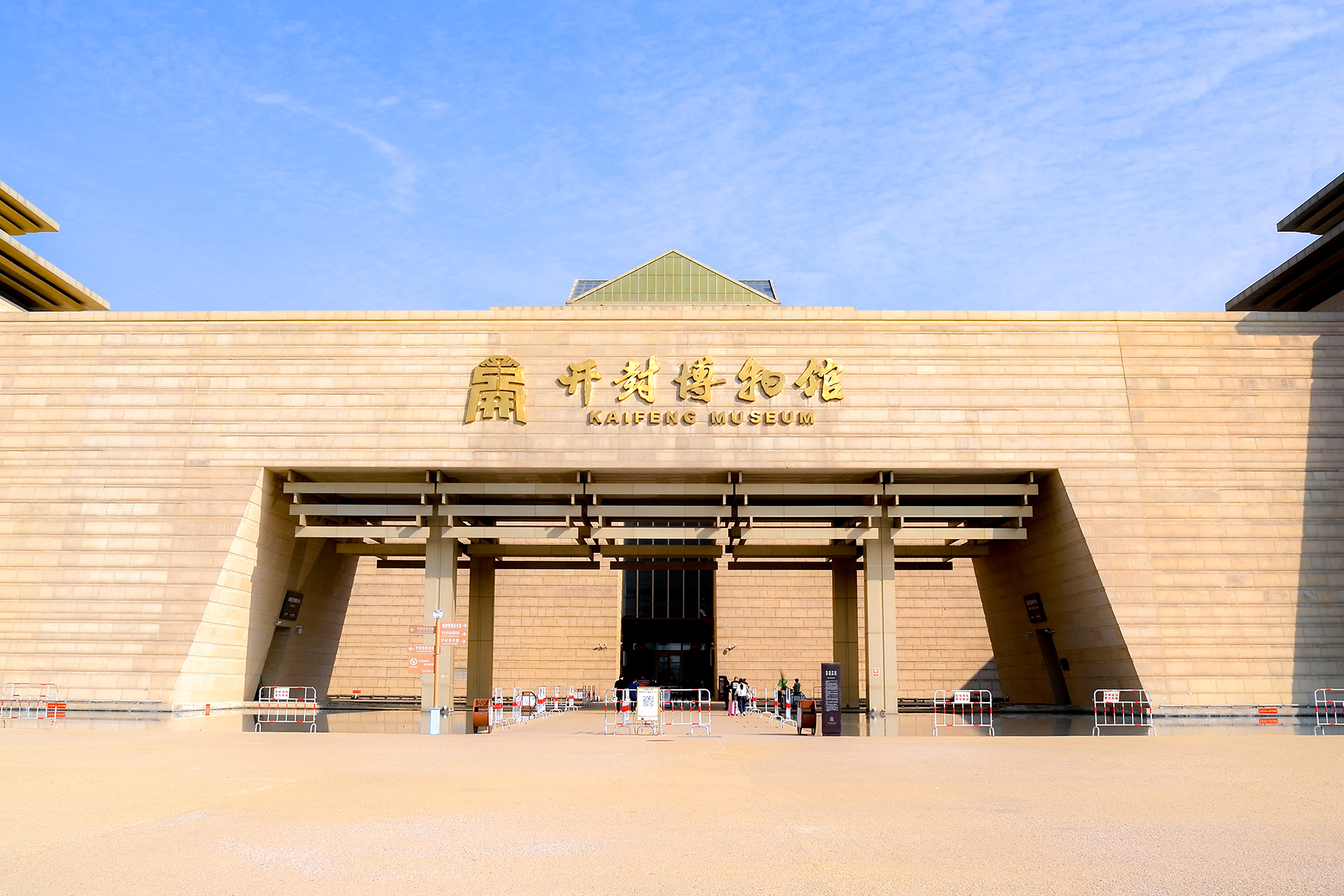
- The new building of Kaifeng Museum
- Established: 1962
- Location: ChinaHenan, Kaifeng City, Kaifeng New Area, Sixth Street, Zhengkai Avenue
- Coordinates: 34.8046°N 114.2479°E
- Type: Comprehensive museum
- Website: http://www.kfsbwg.com

Kaifeng Museum (simplified Chinese: 开封博物馆; traditional Chinese: 開封博物館) is a public museum located in Kaifeng, Henan Province, China. Established in 1962, the museum is dedicated to the preservation, research, and exhibition of cultural artifacts related to the heritage of Kaifeng, the historical capital of China. The museum is located on Sixth Street, Zhengkai Avenue, Kaifeng New Area, Kaifeng City, Henan. It is a comprehensive municipal museum under the administration of Kaifeng City.

== History ==
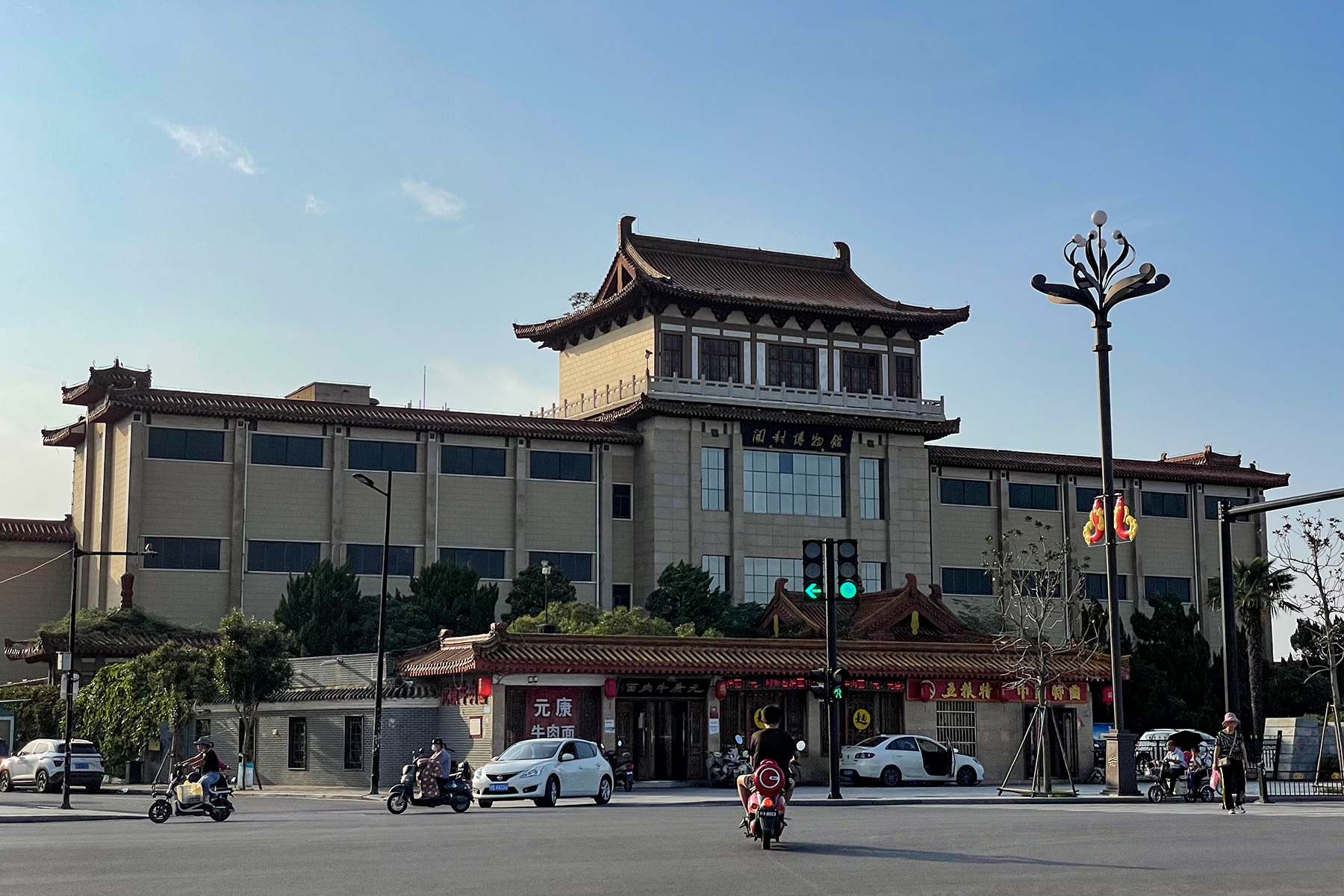
The old building located at No. 26 Yingbin Road

Kaifeng Museum was established in March 1962 on the former site of the Henan Museum after its relocation from Kaifeng to Zhengzhou. Some professionals from the Henan Museum were retained, and a portion of historical artifacts were transferred to the new institution. The museum focuses on social history. In 1984, preparations began for a new building, which was completed in September 1988 and officially opened to the public on China's National Day. The new building was situated at No. 26 Yingbin Road, Kaifeng, near Bao Gong Lake, covering a total area of 16,000 square meters with a construction area of over 10,000 square meters. The main building, designed in the shape of the Chinese character "山" (mountain), features a traditional single-eave hipped-gable roof covered with yellow glazed tiles. The central hall has four floors, the front exhibition area three floors, and the wing exhibition halls two floors, totaling 13 exhibition rooms. Additionally, there are 500 square meters of stone-carving corridors on the north and south sides and a 1,300-square-meter artifact storage area.

In March 2014, construction began on the new Kaifeng Museum building, which was completed in 2016. The new museum is located on Sixth Street, Zhengkai Avenue, in Kaifeng New Area, north of Zhengkai Avenue and east of Zhongyi Lake. On April 21, 2016, the old museum at No. 26 Yingbin Road was closed to the public to prepare for the relocation to the new building.

Kaifeng Museum houses over 80,000 cultural relics, with a focus on bronze ware, ceramics, calligraphy, paintings, and stone carvings. In 2008, it was designated as a National second-grade Museum. In 2017, the museum was upgraded to a National first-grade museums of China by the Chinese Museums Association.

== Gallery ==
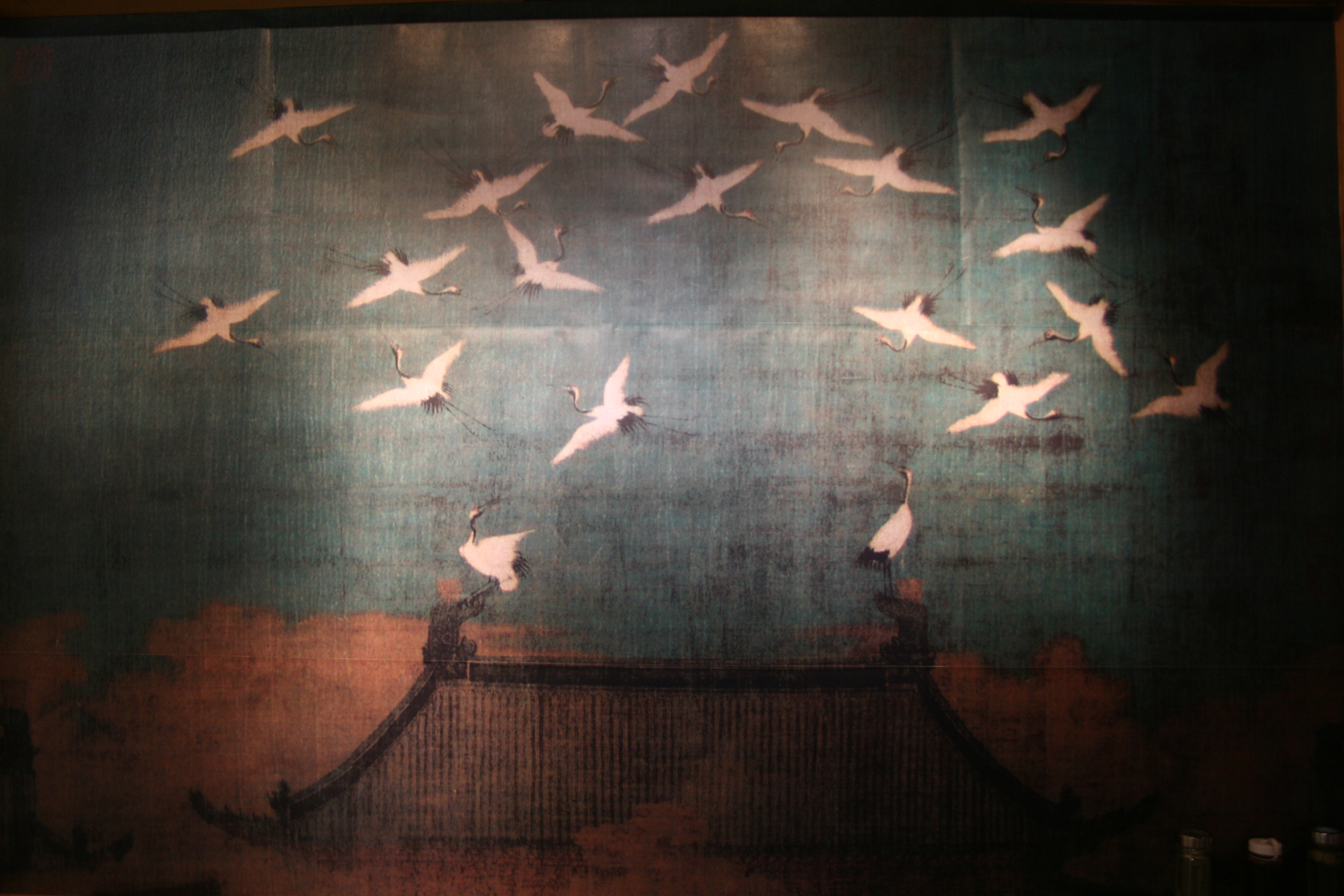

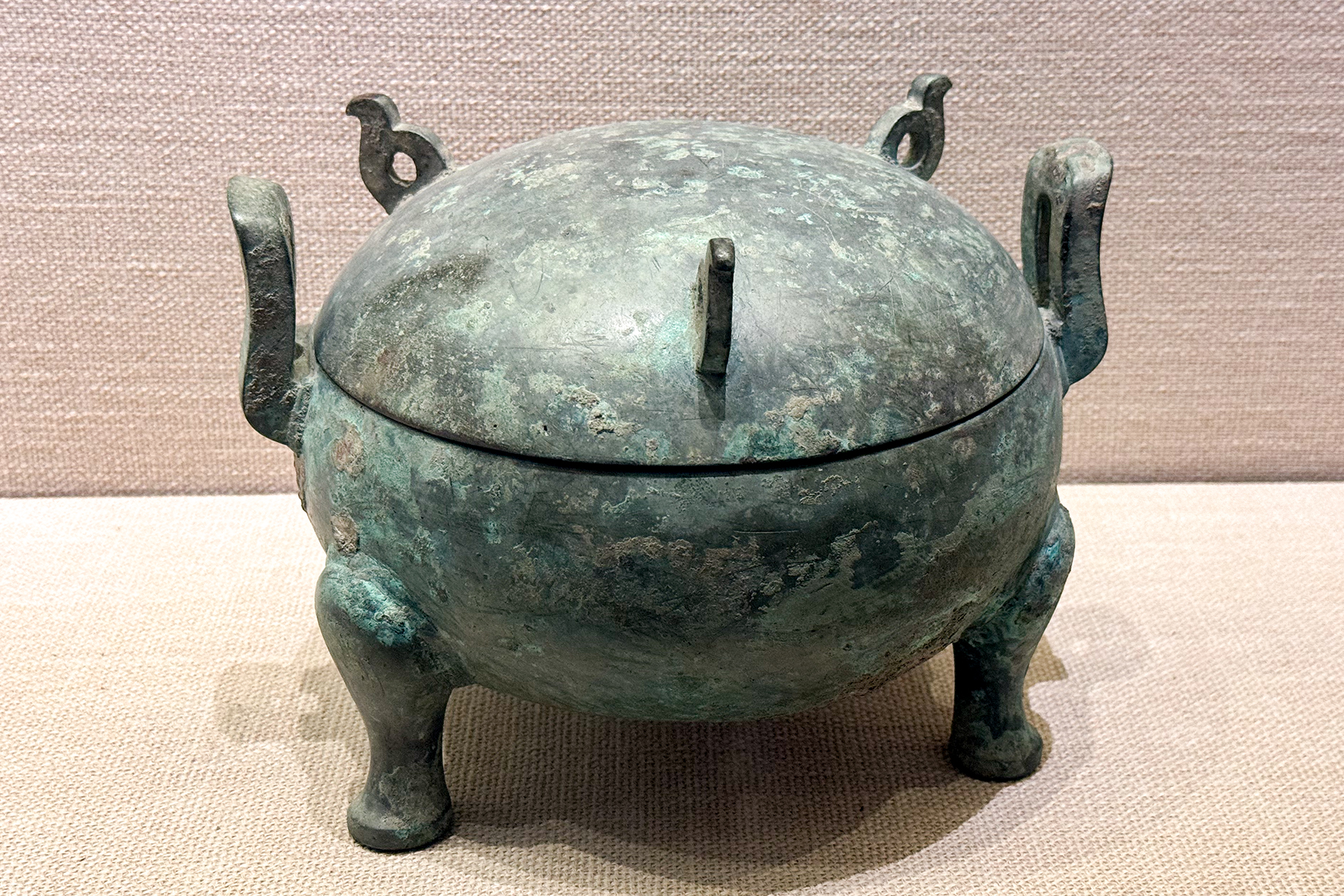

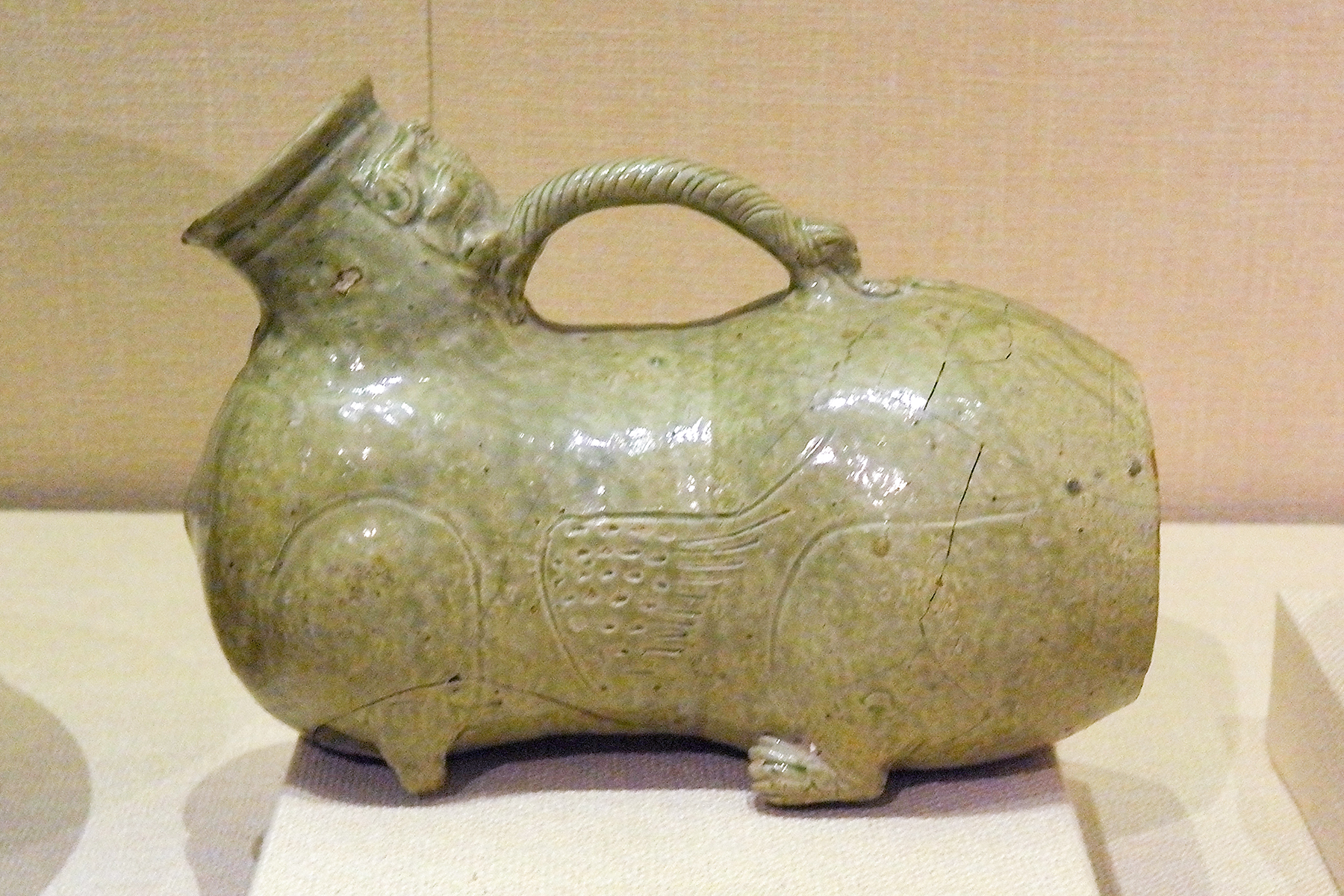

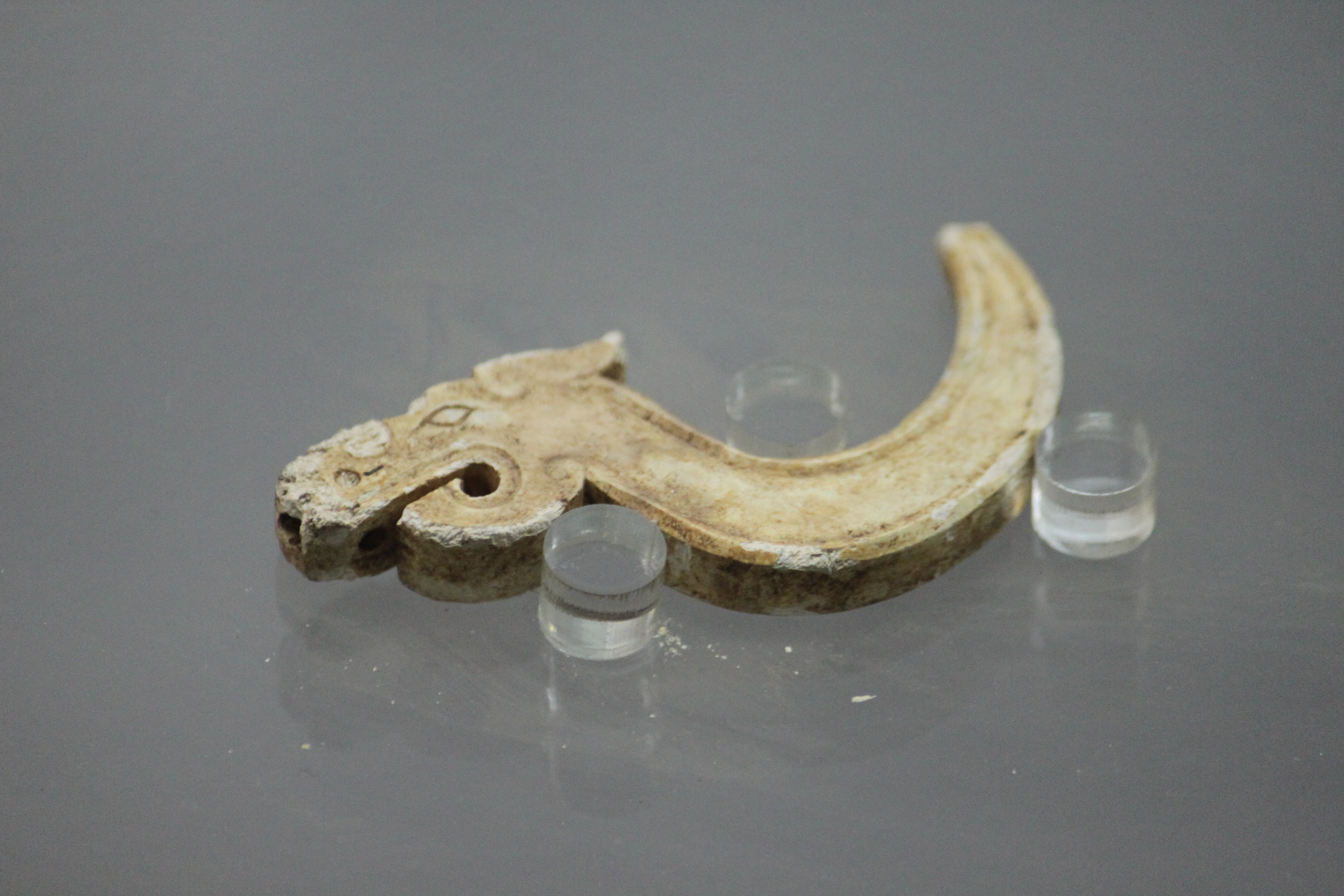

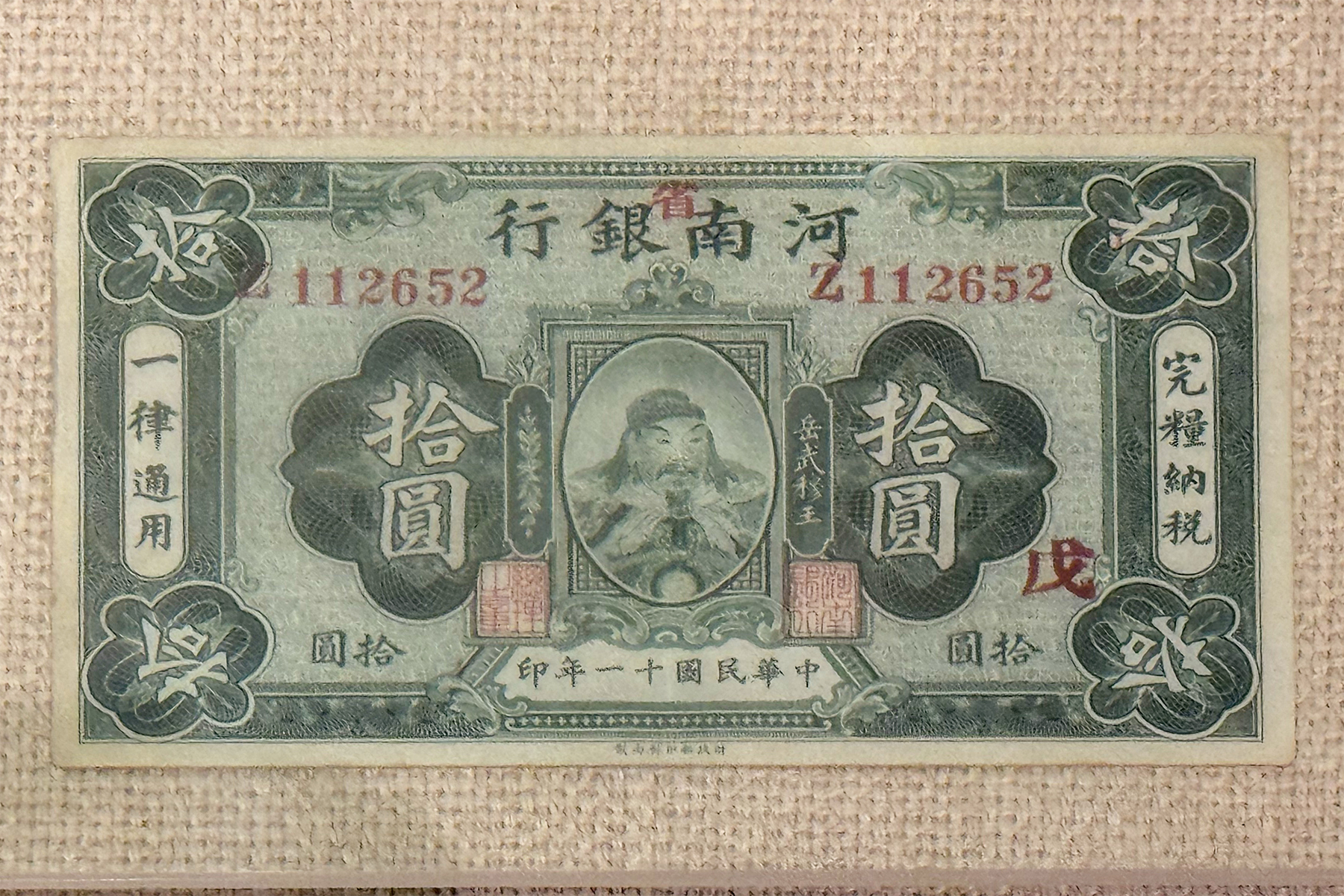
