= Wuhan Museum =

Museum in Wuhan, Hubei, China

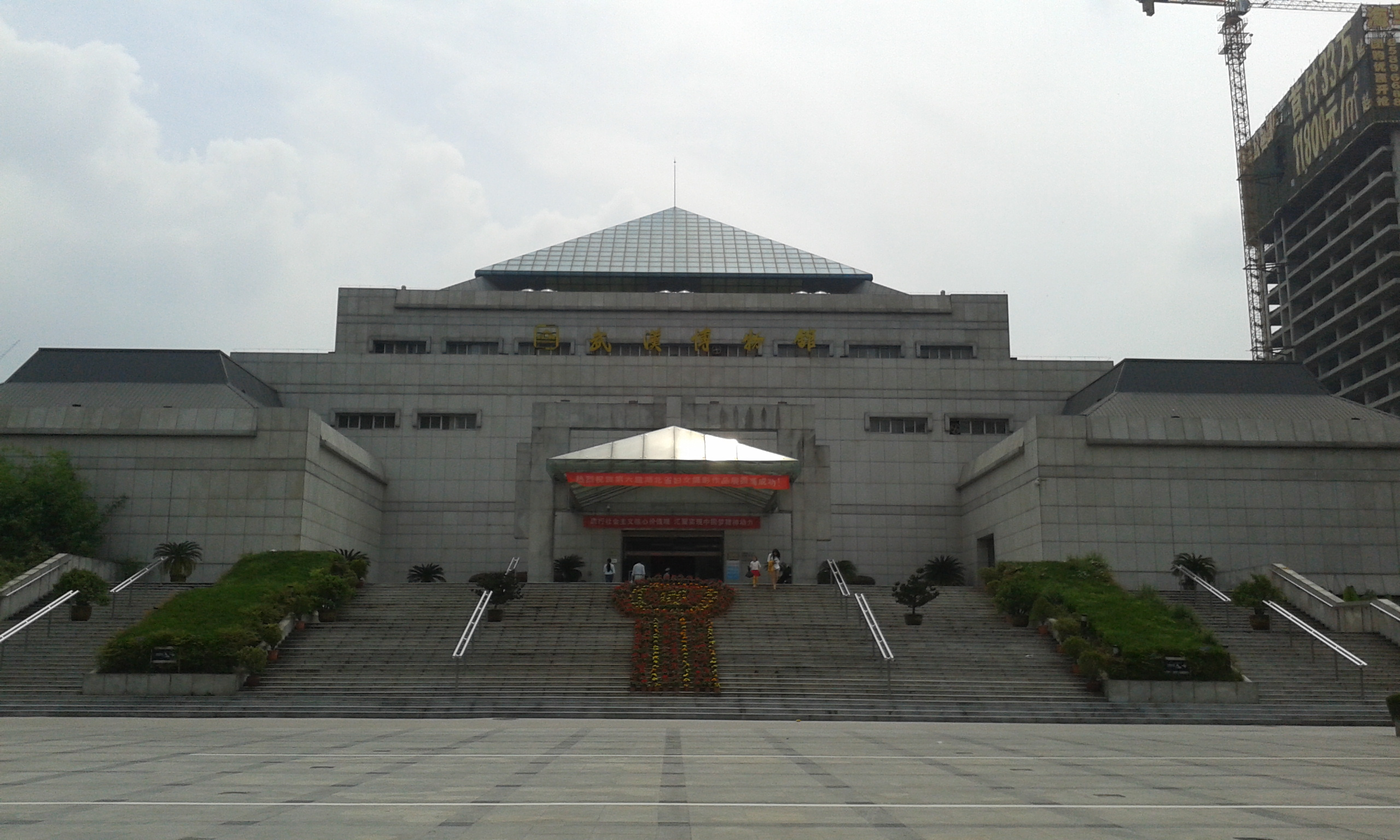
Wuhan Museum

Wuhan Museum (China)

Wuhan Museum is a museum in Wuhan, Hubei, China. Construction began in 1984 and it was opened in 1986. In 2001, a new building was completed and opened to the public. It has a total built-up area of 17,834 square metres (191,960 sq ft). The display area is up to 6,000 square metres (65,000 sq ft). The museum was named in May 2008 as a national first-grade museum of China. In January 2009, Wuhan municipal cultural relic store was merged into Wuhan Museum.

== Collection ==
Wuhan Museum has a collection of more than 100,000 artifacts, including ceramic, bronzeware, paintings and calligraphy, jade, wood carving, enamelware, seals and so on. As a modern comprehensive museum, Wuhan Museum has the function in cultural relic collection, academic reach, publicity and education, cultural exchange, and recreation and entertainment.

== See also ==
- List of museums in China
