= National first-grade museums of China =

Highest museum ranking in China

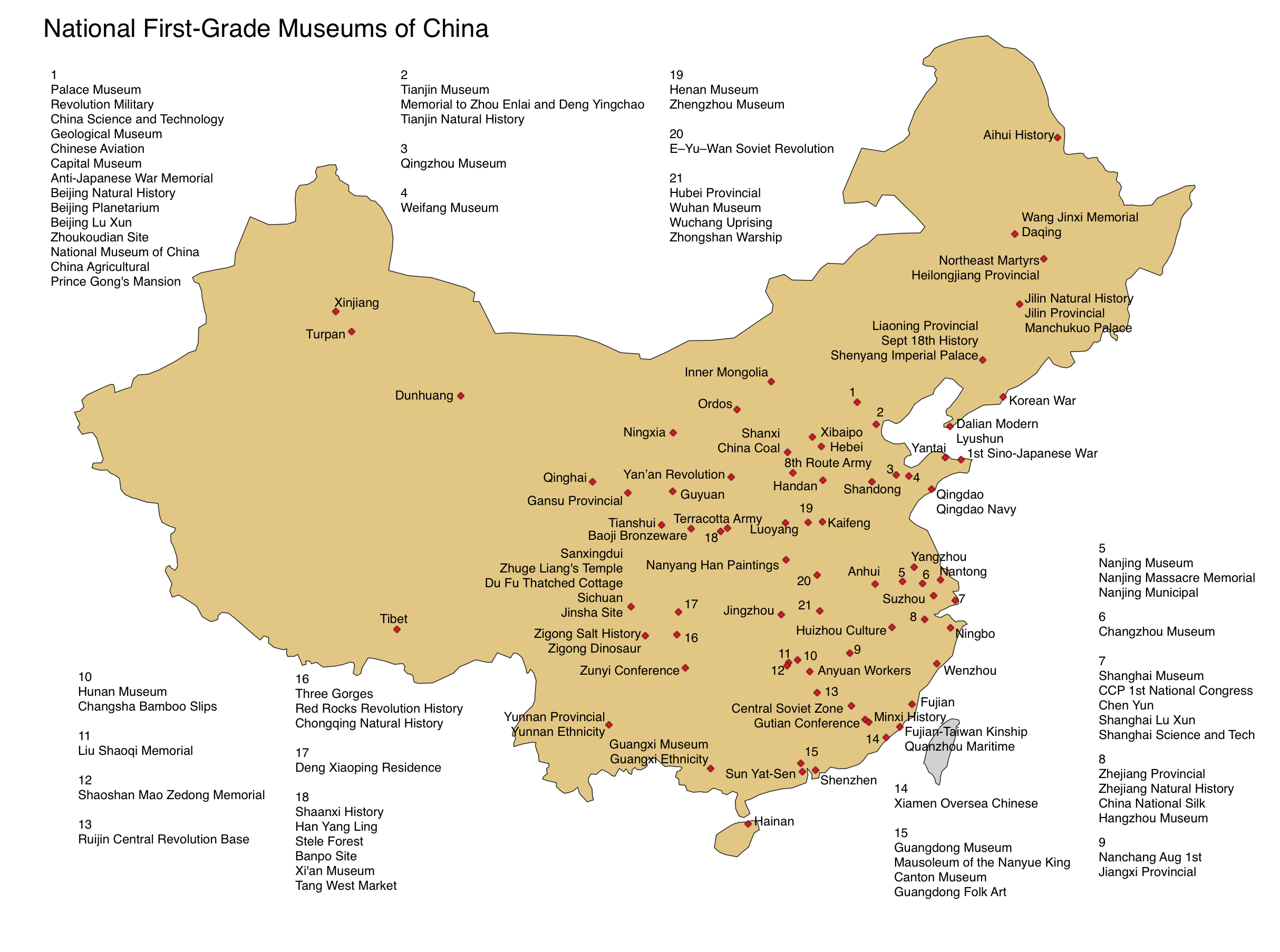
China 1st-Grade National Museums

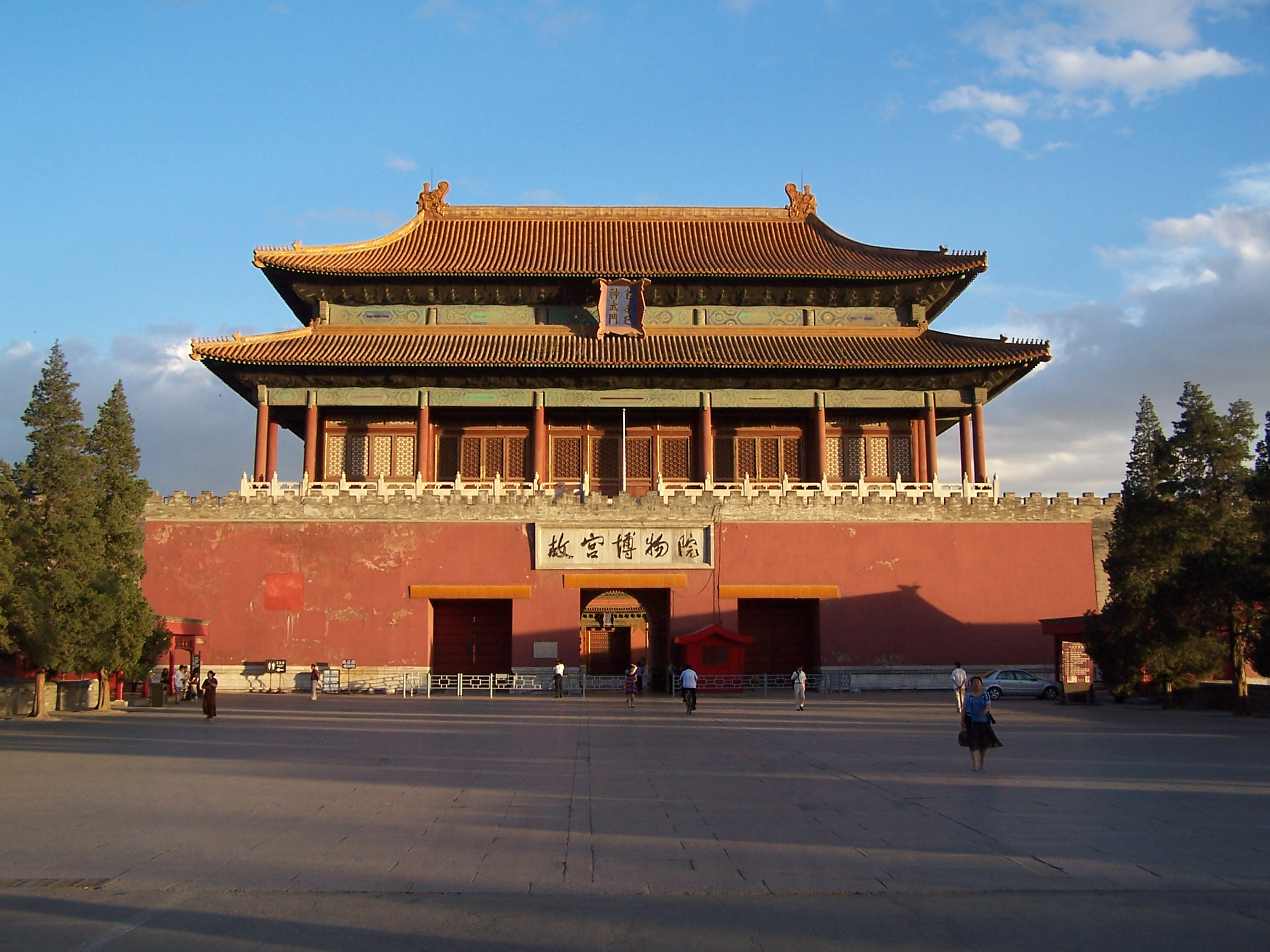
The Forbidden City (Palace Museum) in Beijing

The designation "national first-grade museum" (simplified Chinese: 国家一级博物馆; traditional Chinese: 國家一級博物館; pinyin: guójiā yījí bówùguǎn) is the highest classification for museums in China, as determined by the State Administration of Cultural Heritage (SACH).

A first-grade museum generally has a comprehensive collection of artifacts, or has a large number of items in its collection with "very high historical, cultural, scientific, and artistic value". A first-grade museum is also expected to be a social and educational institution, with a professional staff, long-term volunteers, and facilities for educational services. First-grade museums are not required to be owned by the state. State-owned museums are expected to open for more than 300 days a year, while non-state-owned museums are only expected to be open for 240 days. Performance measures for the museums are expected to be regularly published on government websites.

== Scoring system ==
The SACH evaluates China's museums using a scoring system comprising three criteria: "comprehensive management and infrastructure" (200 points), "collection management and scientific research" (300 points), and "exhibition and social services" (500 points), with a total score of 1000. Museums scoring more than 800 points are classified as first grade. Among the rest, those scoring more than 600 points are classified as second grade, and those with 400 to 600 points are classified as third grade.

== List of first-grade museums ==
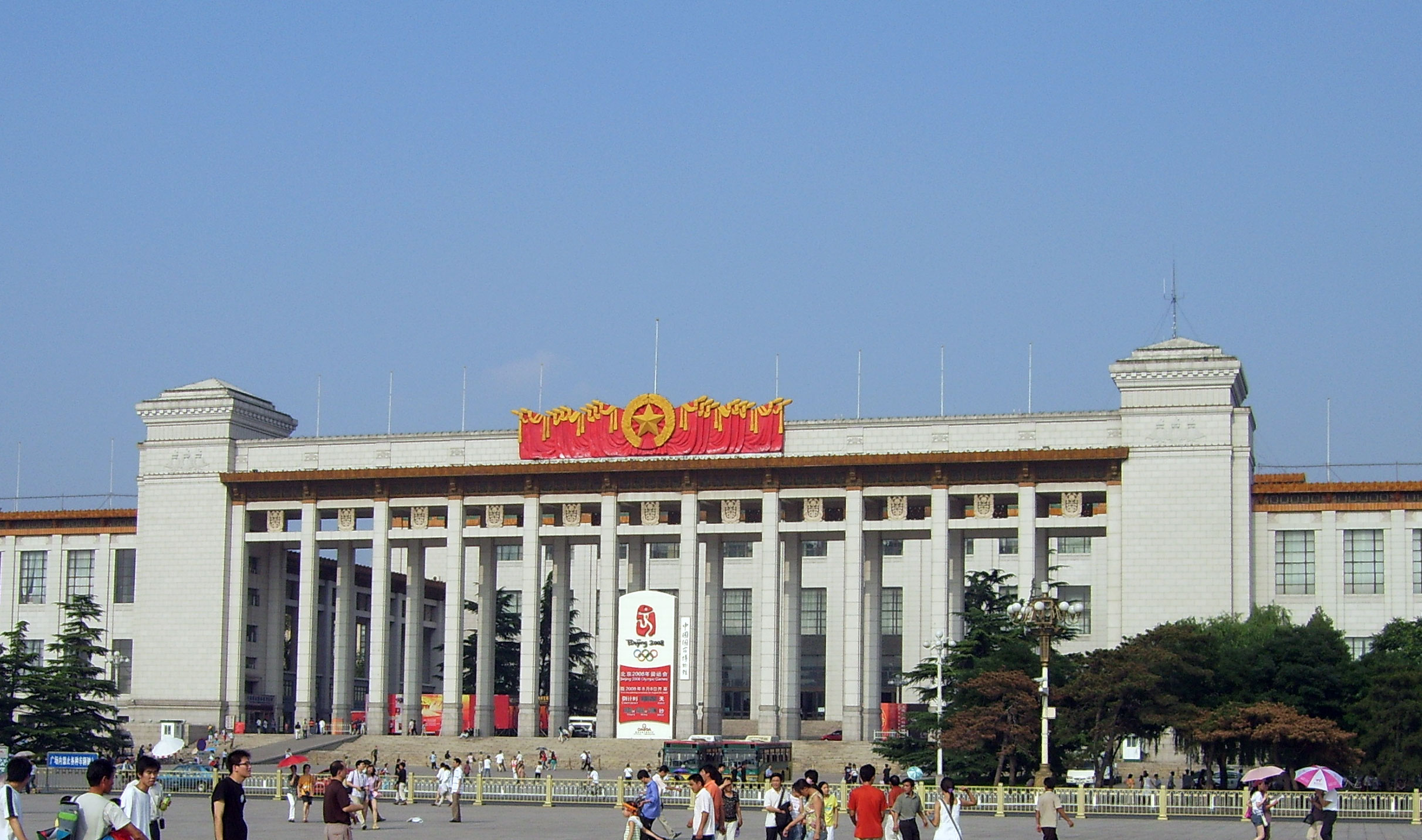
National Museum of China

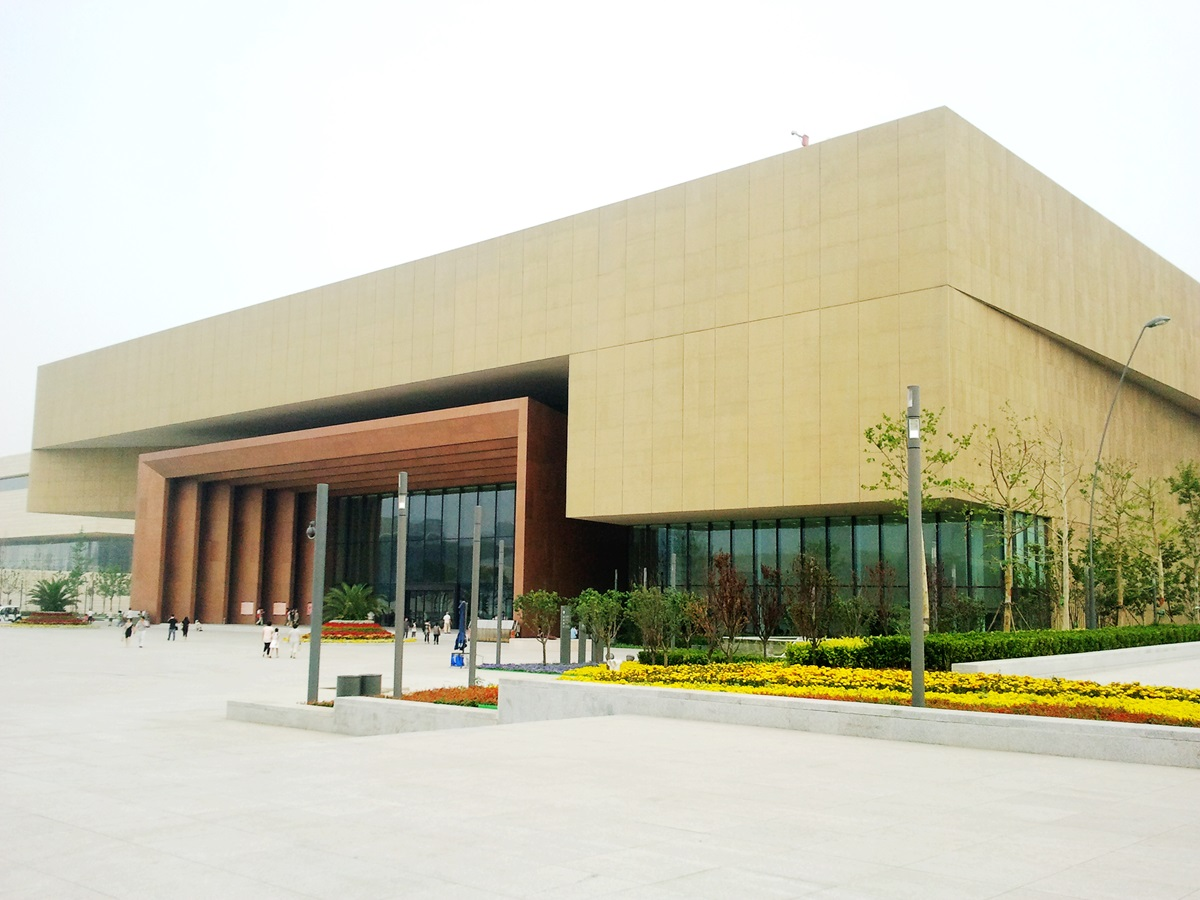
Tianjin Museum

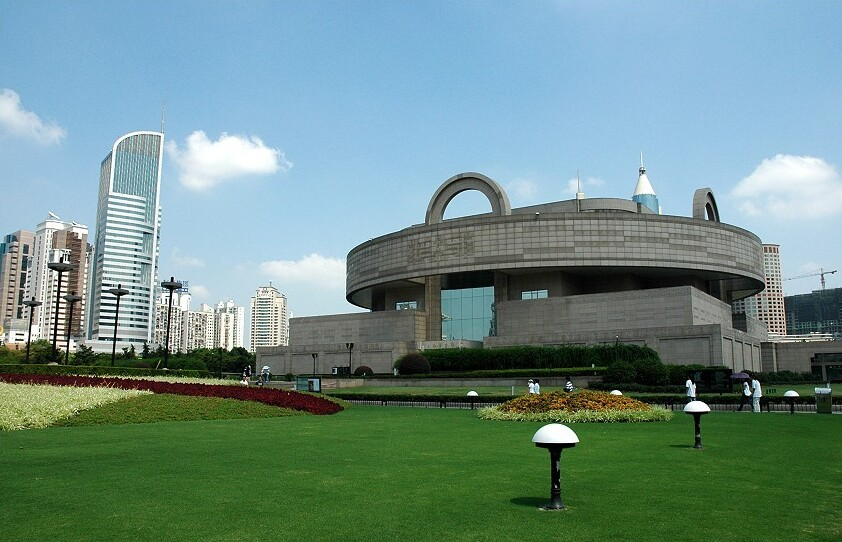
Shanghai Museum

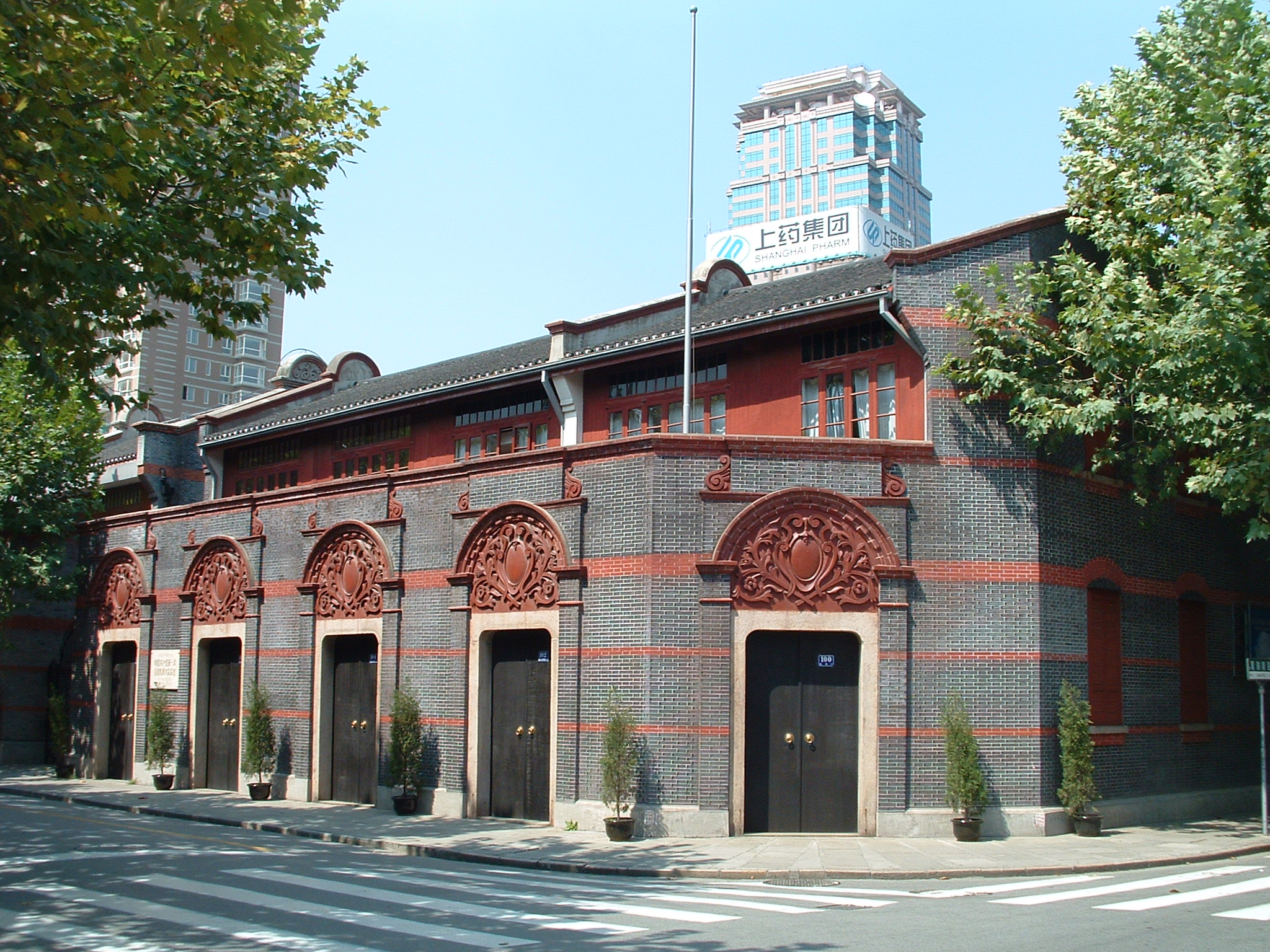
Museum of the First National Congress of the Chinese Communist Party

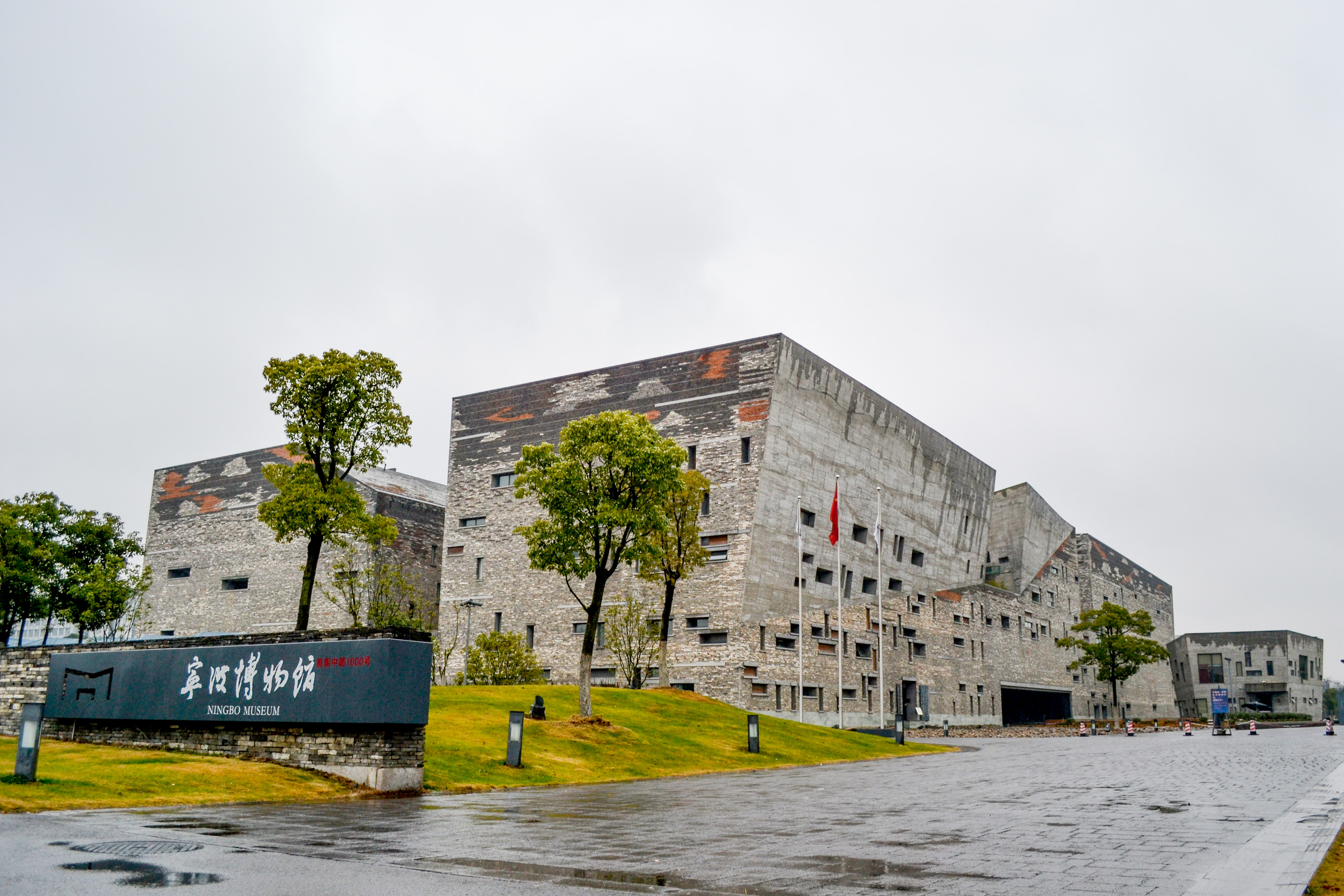
Ningbo Museum

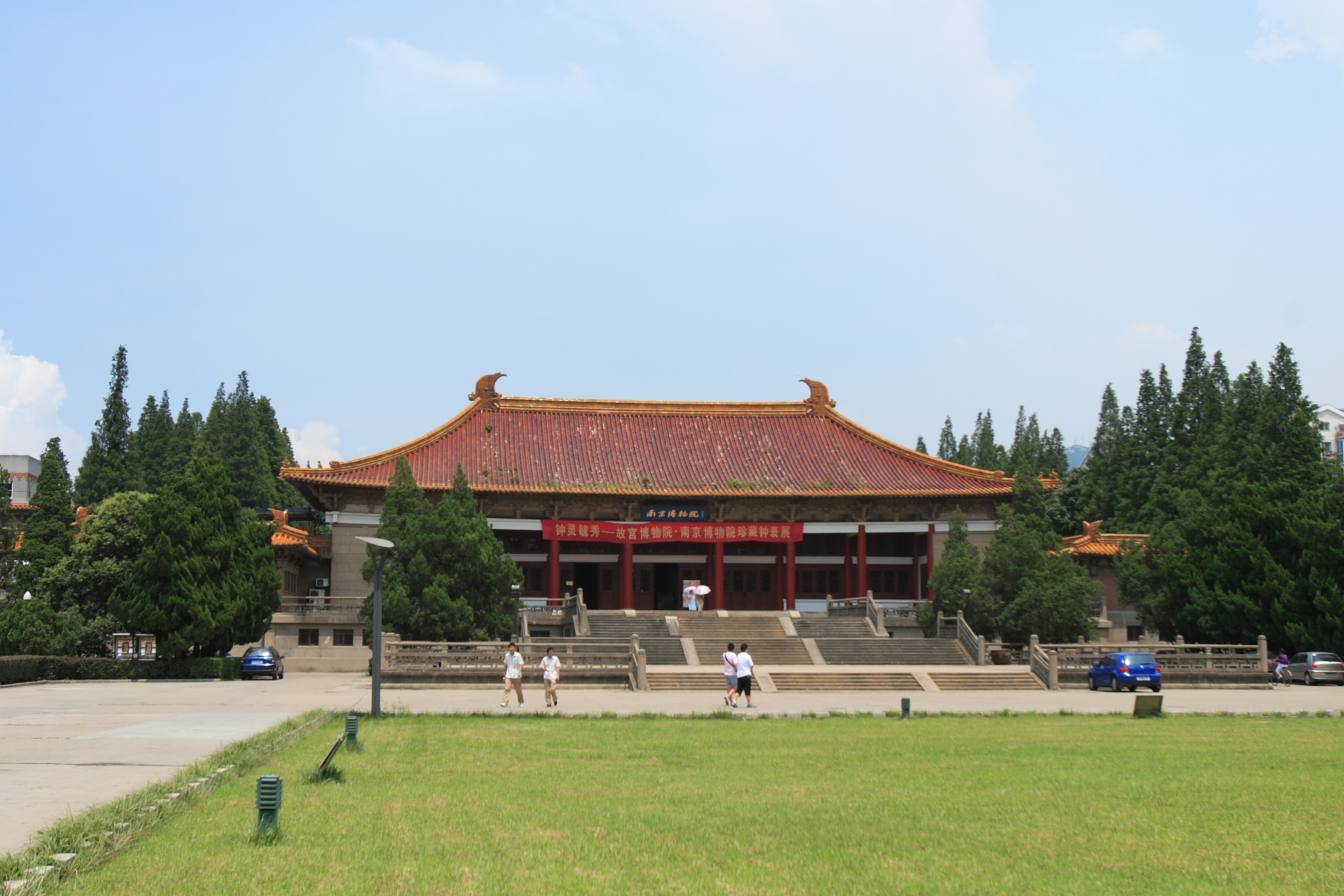
Nanjing Museum

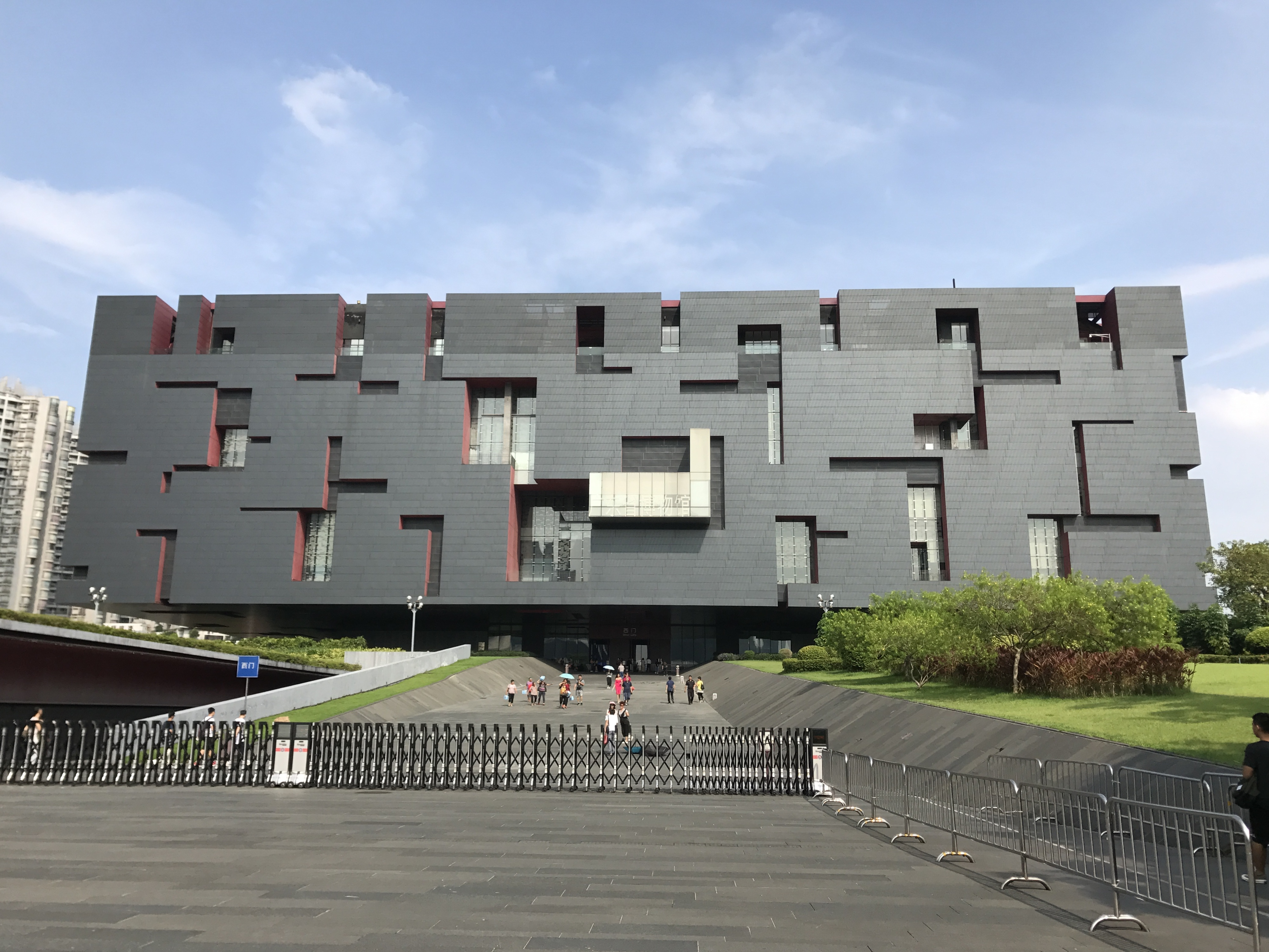
Guangdong Museum

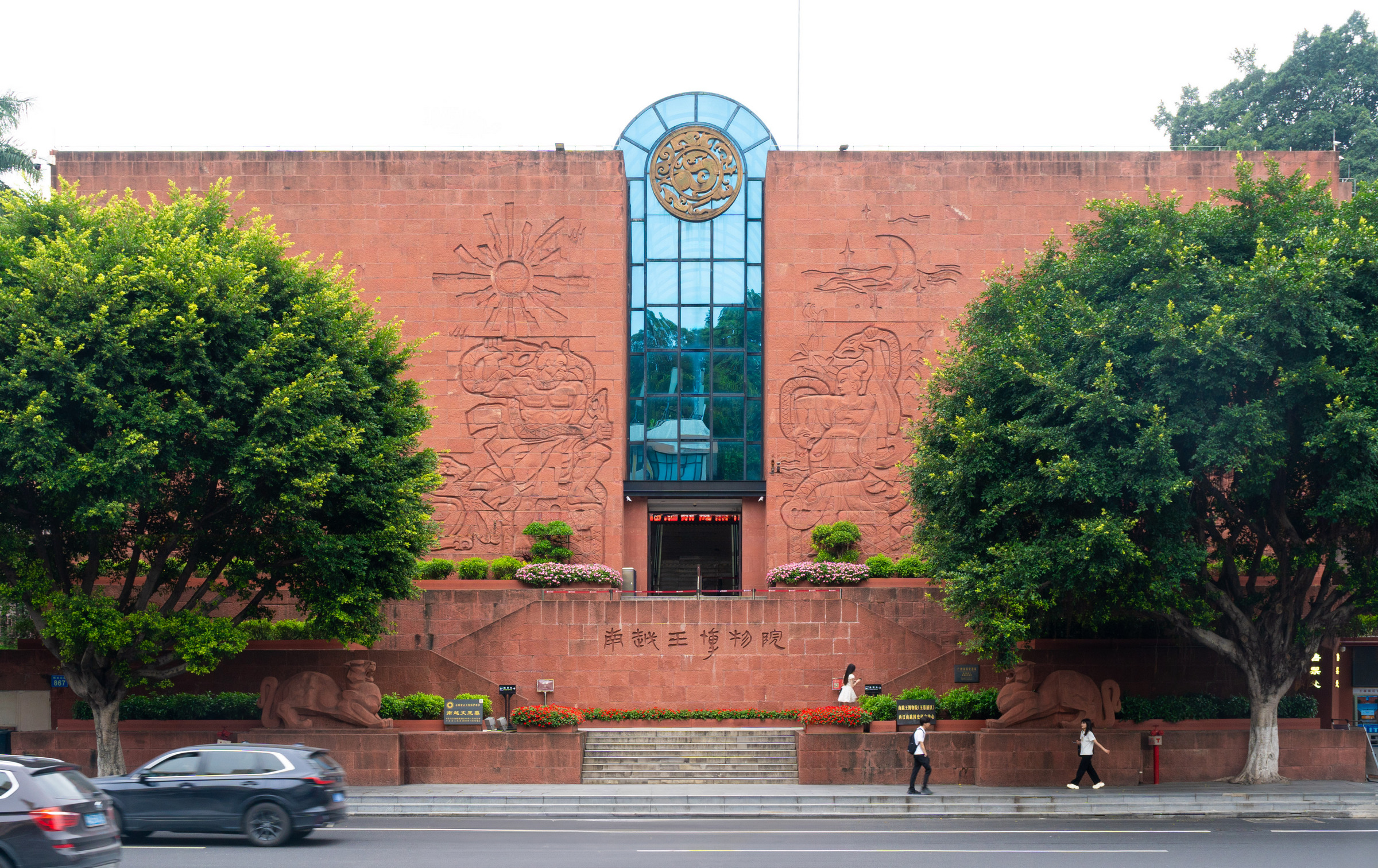
Nanyue King Museum

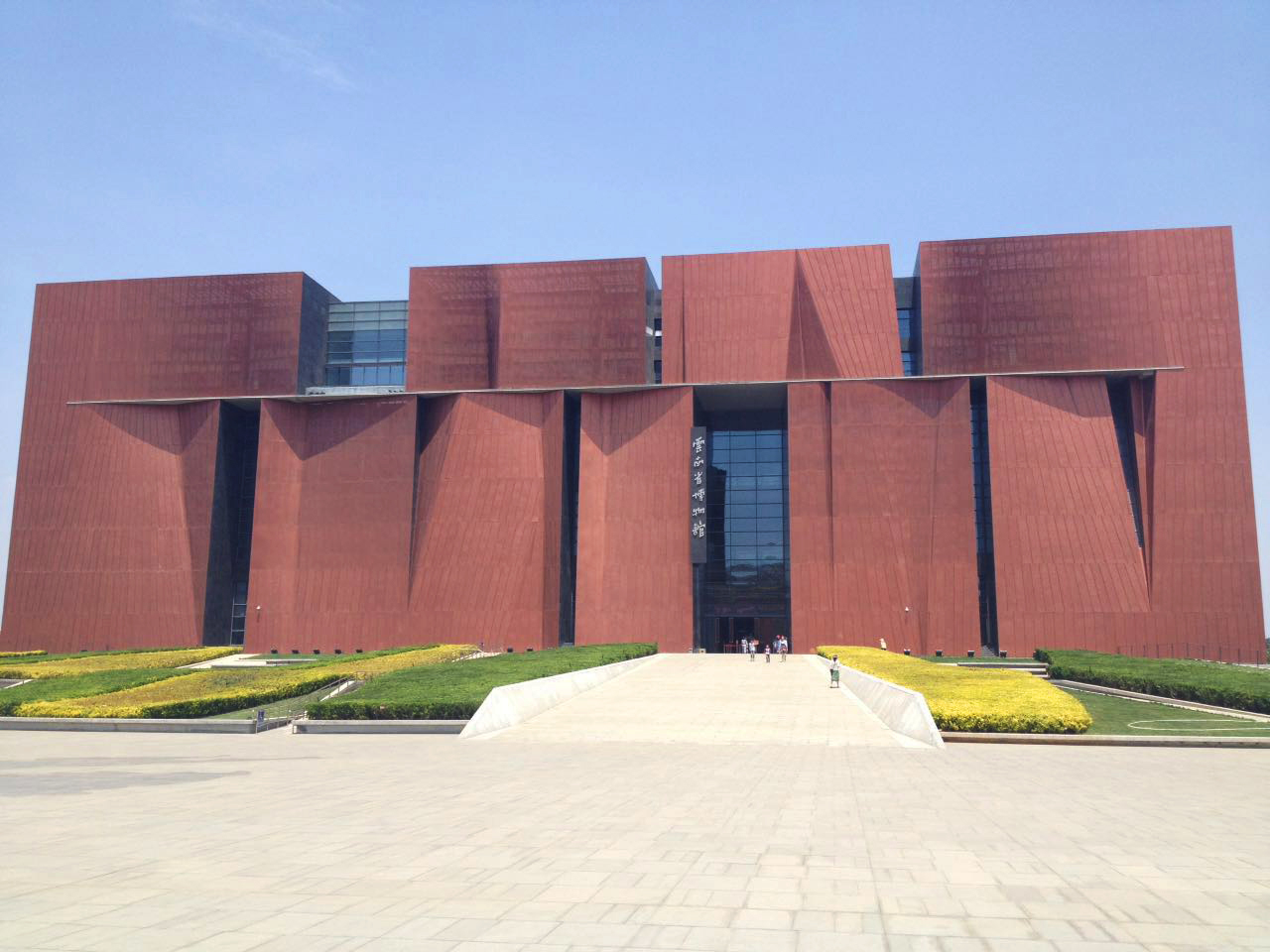
Yunnan Provincial Museum

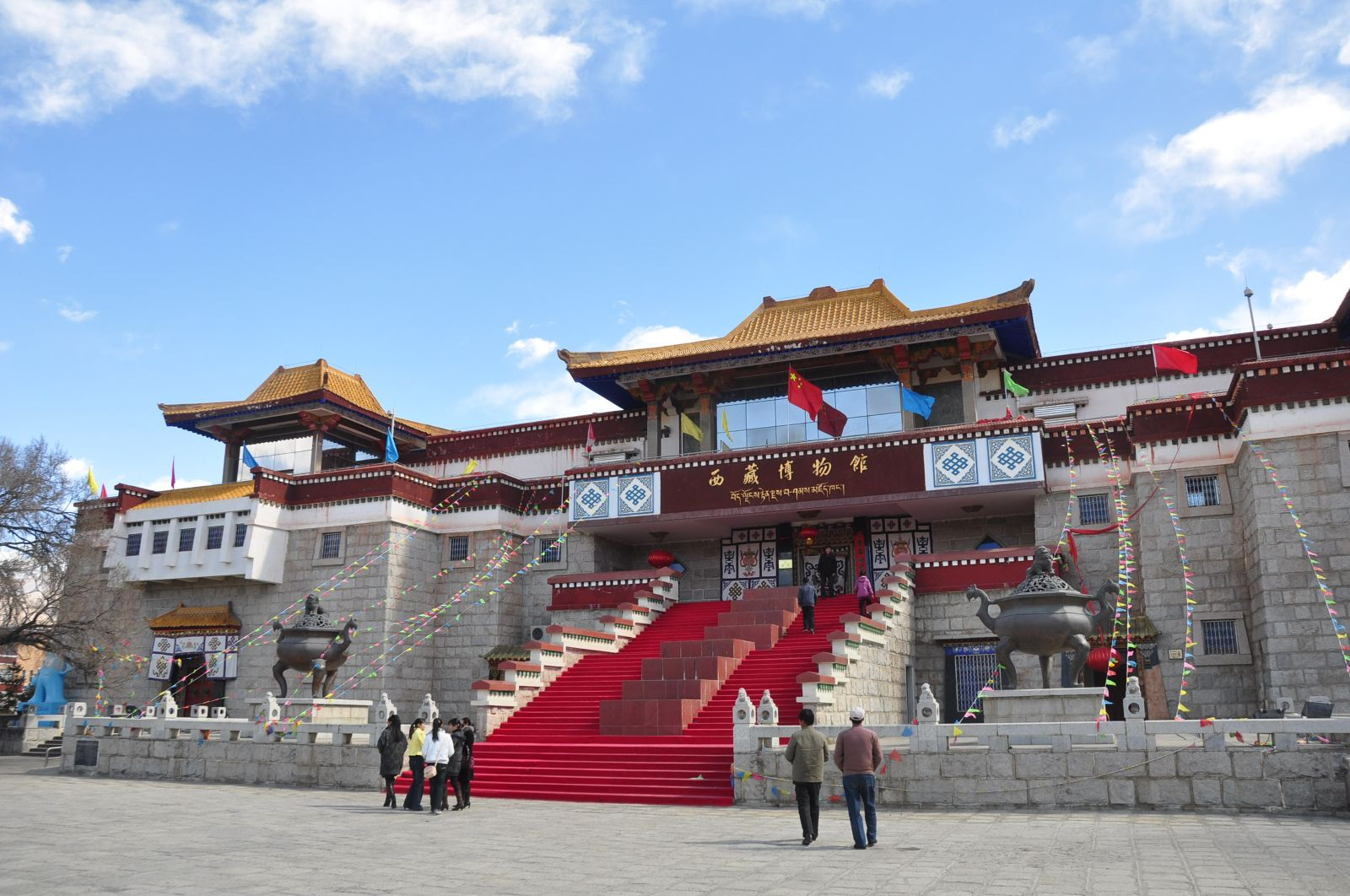
Tibet Museum

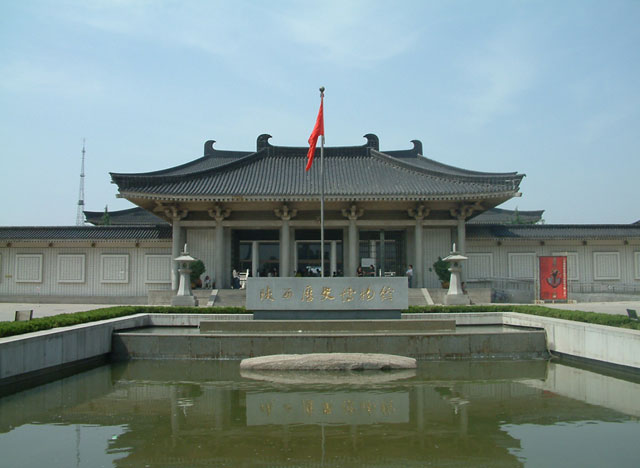
Shaanxi History Museum

On 16 May 2008, the SACH issued the first batch of 83 national first-grade museums, including the Palace Museum. However, in November 2013, 4 of the 83 museums failed to score more than 800 points in their reassessment, and were demoted to second-grade museums. They were the Beijing Planetarium, the Memorial of the War to Resist US Aggression and Aid Korea in Dandong, the Chinese Navy Museum in Qingdao, and the Xiamen Overseas Chinese Museum.

On 15 November 2012, the SACH announced the second batch of 17 national first-grade museums, including the National Museum of China.

On 19 January 2017, the Chinese Museums Association announced the third batch of 34 national first-grade museums including the Beijing Planetarium, which had previously been demoted.

As of 2013, there were 3,354 museums in China, including 811 private ones. There are 131 museums classified as national first-grade as of 2017.

| Museum | City | Province | Batch |
|---|---|---|---|
| Palace Museum | Beijing | Beijing | 1 |
| Military Museum of the Chinese People's Revolution | Beijing | Beijing | 1 |
| China Science and Technology Museum | Beijing | Beijing | 1 |
| Geological Museum of China | Beijing | Beijing | 1 |
| Chinese Aviation Museum | Beijing | Beijing | 1 |
| Capital Museum | Beijing | Beijing | 1 |
| Chinese People's Anti-Japanese War Memorial Hall | Beijing | Beijing | 1 |
| Beijing Museum of Natural History | Beijing | Beijing | 1 |
| Beijing Planetarium | Beijing | Beijing | 1, 3 |
| Beijing Lu Xun Museum | Beijing | Beijing | 1 |
| Zhoukoudian Site Museum | Beijing | Beijing | 1 |
| National Museum of China | Beijing | Beijing | 2 |
| China Agricultural Museum | Beijing | Beijing | 2 |
| Prince Gong's Mansion Museum | Beijing | Beijing | 3 |
| Tianjin Museum | Tianjin | Tianjin | 1 |
| Memorial to Zhou Enlai and Deng Yingchao | Tianjin | Tianjin | 1 |
| Tianjin Natural History Museum | Tianjin | Tianjin | 1 |
| Hebei Museum | Shijiazhuang | Hebei | 1 |
| Xibaipo Memorial Museum | Xibaipo | Hebei | 1 |
| Handan Museum | Handan | Hebei | 3 |
| Shanxi Museum | Taiyuan | Shanxi | 1 |
| Taihang Memorial Hall of the Eighth Route Army | Wuxiang County | Shanxi | 1 |
| China Coal Museum | Taiyuan | Shanxi | 1 |
| Inner Mongolia Museum | Hohhot | Inner Mongolia | 1 |
| Ordos Museum | Ordos | Inner Mongolia | 3 |
| Liaoning Provincial Museum | Shenyang | Liaoning | 1 |
| September 18th History Museum | Shenyang | Liaoning | 1 |
| Lüshun Museum | Dalian | Liaoning | 1 |
| ~~Memorial of the War to Resist US Aggression and Aid Korea~~ (delisted) | Dandong | Liaoning | 1 |
| Shenyang Imperial Palace Museum | Shenyang | Liaoning | 3 |
| Dalian Modern Museum | Dalian | Liaoning | 3 |
| Jilin Museum of Natural History | Changchun | Jilin | 1 |
| Jilin Provincial Museum | Changchun | Jilin | 2 |
| Museum of the Imperial Palace of Manchukuo | Changchun | Jilin | 3 |
| Northeast Martyrs Museum | Harbin | Heilongjiang | 1 |
| Wang Jinxi Memorial Hall | Daqing | Heilongjiang | 1 |
| Aihui History Museum | Heihe | Heilongjiang | 1 |
| Heilongjiang Provincial Museum | Harbin | Heilongjiang | 2 |
| Daqing Museum | Daqing | Heilongjiang | 3 |
| Shanghai Museum | Shanghai | Shanghai | 1 |
| Museum of the First National Congress of the Chinese Communist Party | Shanghai | Shanghai | 1 |
| Shanghai Lu Xun Museum | Shanghai | Shanghai | 1 |
| Shanghai Science and Technology Museum | Shanghai | Shanghai | 2 |
| Chen Yun Museum | Shanghai | Shanghai | 3 |
| Nanjing Museum | Nanjing | Jiangsu | 1 |
| Nanjing Massacre Memorial Hall | Nanjing | Jiangsu | 1 |
| Suzhou Museum | Suzhou | Jiangsu | 1 |
| Nantong Museum | Nantong | Jiangsu | 1 |
| Yangzhou Museum | Yangzhou | Jiangsu | 1 |
| Changzhou Museum | Changzhou | Jiangsu | 3 |
| Nanjing Municipal Museum | Nanjing | Jiangsu | 3 |
| Zhejiang Provincial Museum | Hangzhou | Zhejiang | 1 |
| Zhejiang Museum of Natural History | Hangzhou | Zhejiang | 2 |
| China National Silk Museum | Hangzhou | Zhejiang | 2 |
| Ningbo Museum | Ningbo | Zhejiang | 2 |
| Wenzhou Museum | Wenzhou | Zhejiang | 3 |
| Hangzhou Museum | Hangzhou | Zhejiang | 3 |
| Anhui Museum | Hefei | Anhui | 1 |
| Huizhou Culture Museum | Huangshan | Anhui | 3 |
| Fujian Museum | Fuzhou | Fujian | 1 |
| ~~Xiamen Overseas Chinese Museum~~ (delisted) | Xiamen | Fujian | 1 |
| China Museum of Relationship of Fujian–Taiwan Kinship | Quanzhou | Fujian | 1 |
| Quanzhou Maritime Museum | Quanzhou | Fujian | 1 |
| Gutian Conference Memorial Hall | Gutian | Fujian | 1 |
| Central Soviet Area (Minxi) History Museum | Longyan | Fujian | 3 |
| Jiangxi Provincial Museum | Nanchang | Jiangxi | 1 |
| Nanchang August 1st Memorial Hall | Nanchang | Jiangxi | 1 |
| Jinggangshan Revolutionary Museum | Jinggangshan | Jiangxi | 1 |
| Ruijin Central Revolutionary Base Museum | Ruijin | Jiangxi | 1 |
| Anyuan Workers' Movement Museum | Pingxiang | Jiangxi | 3 |
| Qingdao Museum | Qingdao | Shandong | 1 |
| ~~Chinese Navy Museum~~ (delisted) | Qingdao | Shandong | 1 |
| First Sino-Japanese War Museum | Weihai | Shandong | 1 |
| Qingzhou Museum | Qingzhou | Shandong | 1 |
| Shandong Museum | Jinan | Shandong | 2 |
| Yantai Museum | Yantai | Shandong | 3 |
| Weifang Museum | Weifang | Shandong | 3 |
| Henan Museum | Zhengzhou | Henan | 1 |
| Zhengzhou Museum | Zhengzhou | Henan | 1 |
| Luoyang Museum | Luoyang | Henan | 1 |
| Nanyang Han Paintings Museum | Nanyang | Henan | 1 |
| Kaifeng Museum | Kaifeng | Henan | 3 |
| Eyuwan Soviet Revolution Museum | Xin County | Henan | 3 |
| Hubei Provincial Museum | Wuhan | Hubei | 1 |
| Jingzhou Museum | Jingzhou | Hubei | 1 |
| Wuhan Museum | Wuhan | Hubei | 1 |
| Wuchang Uprising Museum | Wuhan | Hubei | 3 |
| Zhongshan Warship Museum | Wuhan | Hubei | 3 |
| Hunan Museum | Changsha | Hunan | 1 |
| Shaoshan Mao Zedong Memorial Museum | Shaoshan | Hunan | 1 |
| Liu Shaoqi Museum | Ningxiang | Hunan | 1 |
| Changsha Bamboo Slips Museum | Changsha | Hunan | 3 |
| Guangdong Museum | Guangzhou | Guangdong | 1 |
| Nanyue King Museum | Guangzhou | Guangdong | 1 |
| Museum of Dr. Sun Yat-sen | Zhongshan | Guangdong | 1 |
| Shenzhen Museum | Shenzhen | Guangdong | 2 |
| Guangzhou Museum | Guangzhou | Guangdong | 3 |
| Guangdong Folk Art Museum | Guangzhou | Guangdong | 3 |
| Guangxi Museum | Nanning | Guangxi | 1 |
| Guangxi Museum of Ethnicity | Nanning | Guangxi | 3 |
| Hainan Museum | Haikou | Hainan | 2 |
| Three Gorges Museum | Chongqing | Chongqing | 1 |
| Hongyan Revolution History Museum | Chongqing | Chongqing | 2 |
| Chongqing Museum of Natural History | Chongqing | Chongqing | 3 |
| Sanxingdui Museum | Chengdu | Sichuan | 1 |
| Deng Xiaoping Residence Museum | Guang'an | Sichuan | 1 |
| Zigong Dinosaur Museum | Zigong | Sichuan | 1 |
| Wuhou Shrine Museum | Chengdu | Sichuan | 1 |
| Du Fu Thatched Cottage | Chengdu | Sichuan | 1 |
| Sichuan Museum | Chengdu | Sichuan | 2 |
| Jinsha Site Museum | Chengdu | Sichuan | 2 |
| Zigong Salt History Museum | Zigong | Sichuan | 3 |
| Zunyi Conference Museum | Zunyi | Guizhou | 1 |
| Yunnan Provincial Museum | Kunming | Yunnan | 1 |
| Yunnan Nationalities Museum | Kunming | Yunnan | 1 |
| Tibet Museum | Lhasa | Tibet | 1 |
| Shaanxi History Museum | Xi'an | Shaanxi | 1 |
| Terracotta Army Museum | Xi'an | Shaanxi | 1 |
| Yan'an Revolution Museum | Yan'an | Shaanxi | 1 |
| Han Yang Ling Museum | Xi'an | Shaanxi | 1 |
| Stele Forest Museum | Xi'an | Shaanxi | 1 |
| Banpo Museum | Xi'an | Shaanxi | 1 |
| Xi'an Museum | Xi'an | Shaanxi | 2 |
| Baoji Bronzeware Museum | Baoji | Shaanxi | 3 |
| Tang West Market Museum | Xi'an | Shaanxi | 3 |
| Gansu Provincial Museum | Lanzhou | Gansu | 2 |
| Tianshui Museum | Tianshui | Gansu | 3 |
| Dunhuang Research Academy | Dunhuang | Gansu | 3 |
| Guyuan Museum | Guyuan | Ningxia | 1 |
| Ningxia Museum | Yinchuan | Ningxia | 2 |
| Qinghai Museum | Xining | Qinghai | 3 |
| Xinjiang Museum | Ürümqi | Xinjiang | 1 |
| Turpan Museum | Turpan | Xinjiang | 3 |

== See also ==
- National first-class library
