= Hangzhou Museum =

Museum in Hangzhou, China

- Chinese: 杭州博物馆
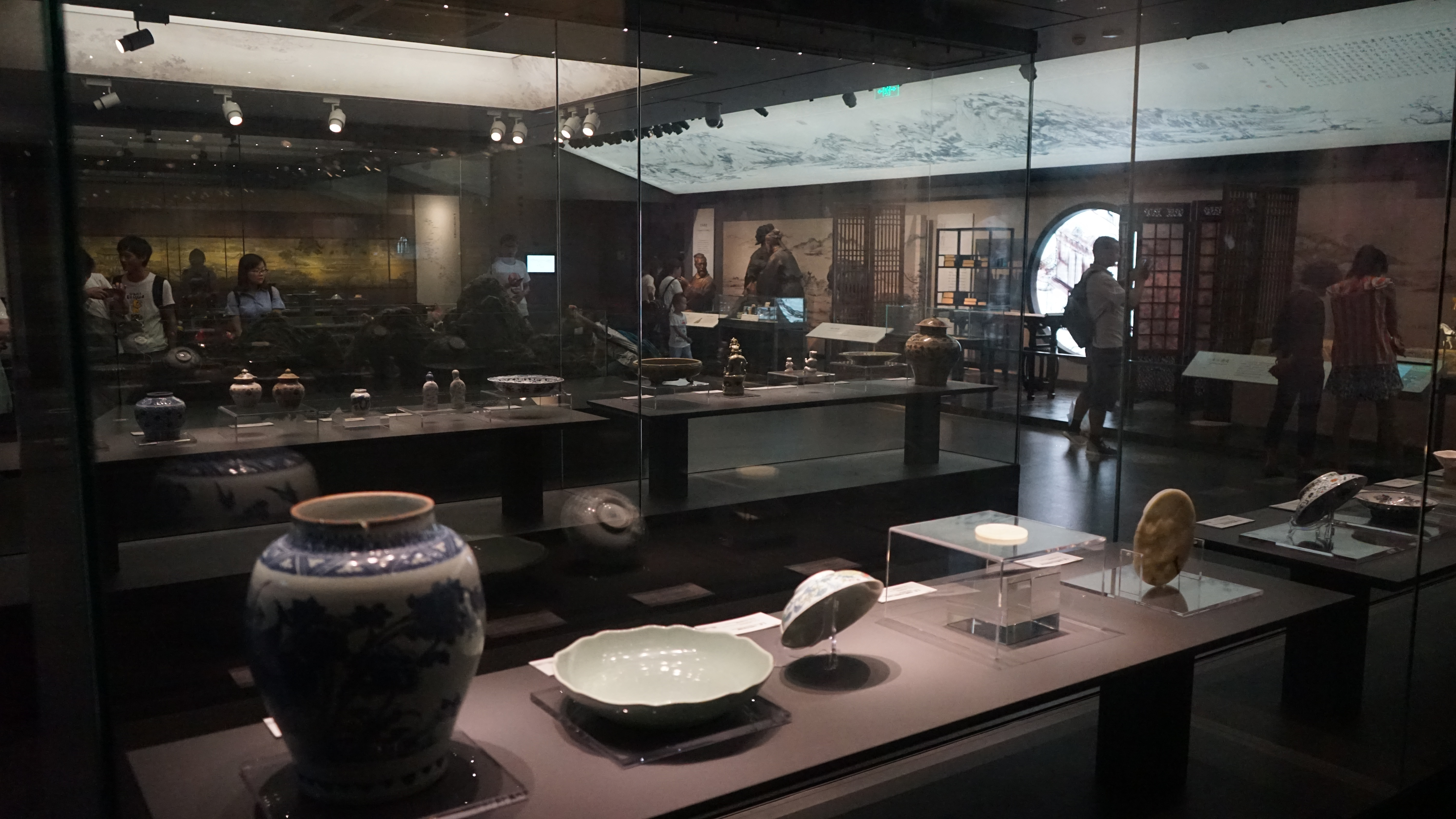
- The exbihition hall of Yuan, Ming and Qing dynasty

- Location within Zhejiang Location within China
- Established: 2021
- Location: 18 Liangdaoshan, Shangcheng district, Hangzhou
- Coordinates: 30°14′20″N 120°09′58″E
- Type: Comprehensive
- Website: hz-museum.cn

Hangzhou Museum, formerly "Hangzhou History Museum", is a national first-grade museum in Hangzhou, Zhejiang, China.

== History ==
Hangzhou History Museum was established in 2001. It was reconstructed and reopened as Hangzhou Museum on June 9, 2012. Later Hangzhou Museum became a national second-grade museum. On 18 May 2019, it was promoted to a national first-grade museum.

== Exhibition ==
The museum primarily showcases the history of Hangzhou. Its permanent collection includes relics from many eras, including works considered to be national treasures. There is a hall dedicated to stamps, and another displaying works of calligraphers and painters from the region as well. The museum has incorporated many elements of modern technology. It also hosts temporary exhibits.

There are hundreds of models of food, including pastries made during the Song dynasty, 800 years ago.

Hangzhou Museum
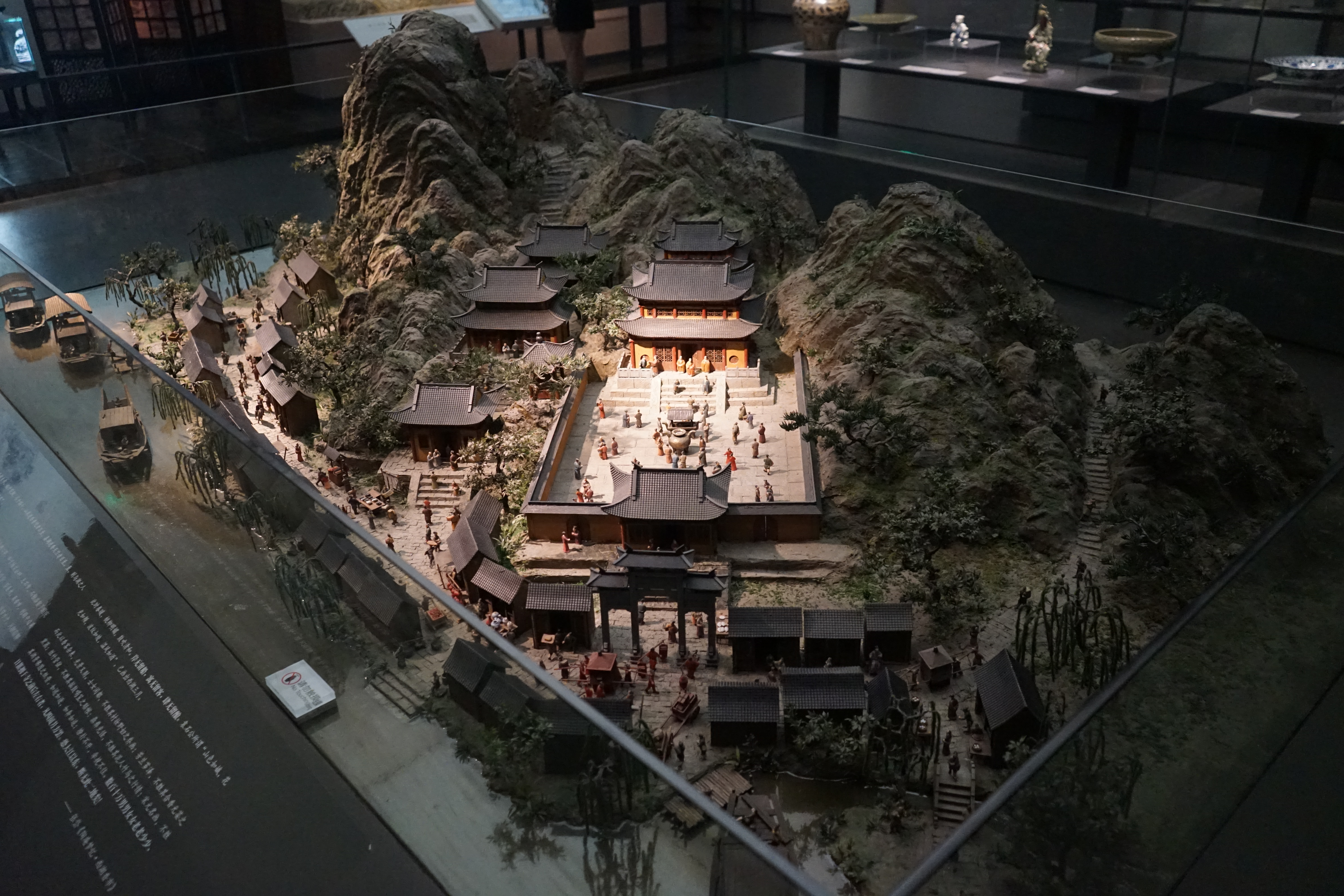
A model reflecting the ancient market

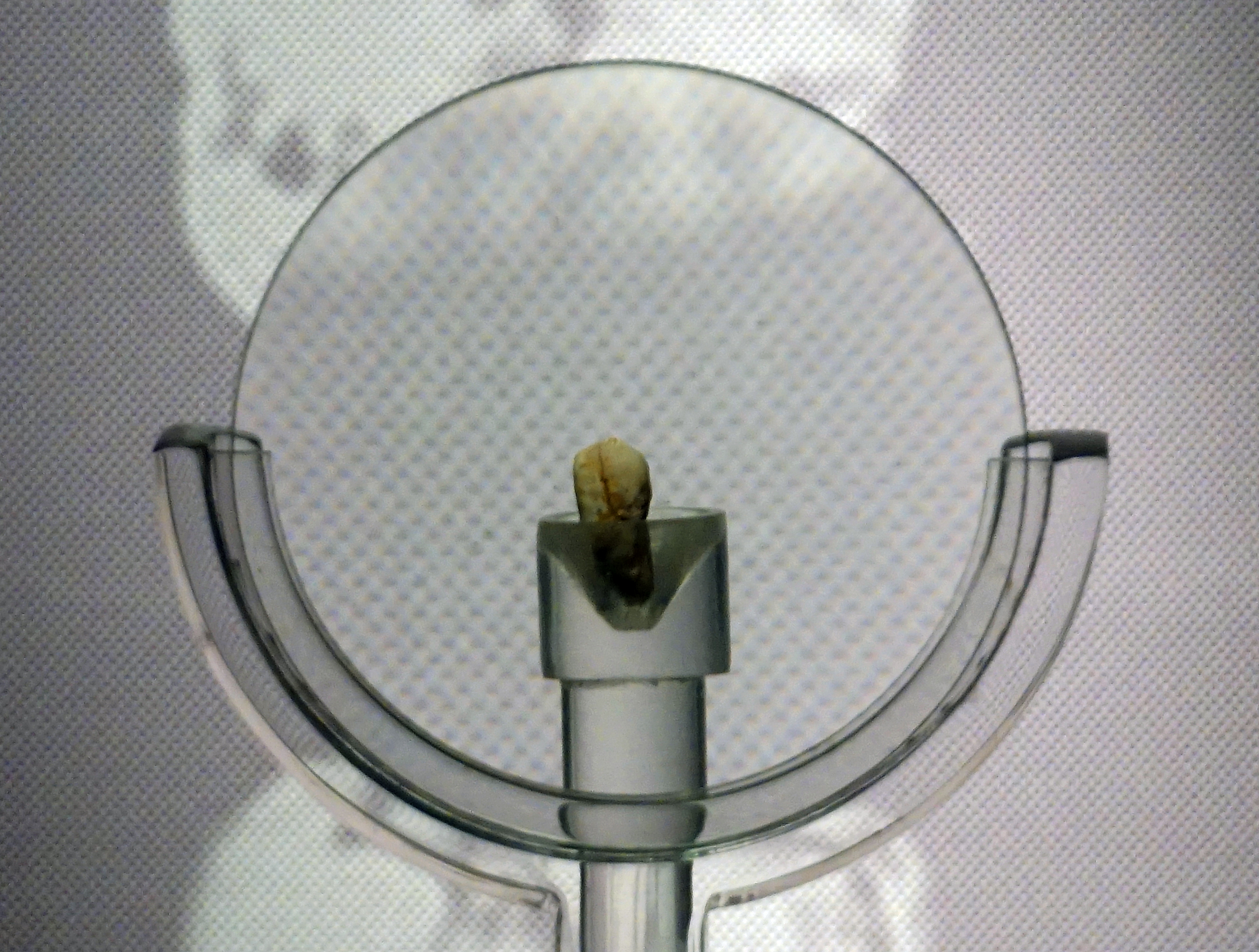
The teeth of ancient Jiande people

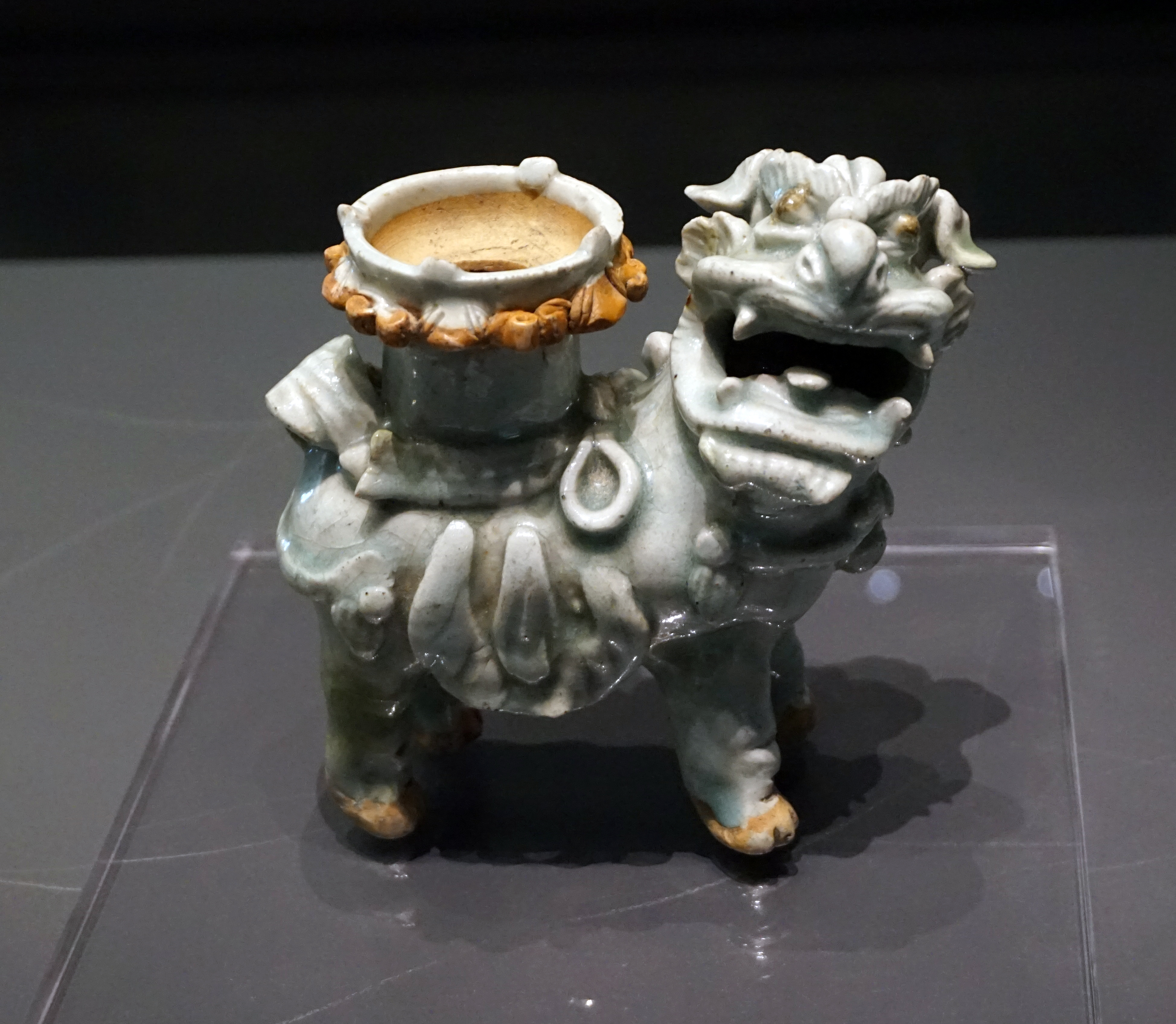
Jingdezhen kiln green white glazed porcelain unicorn candlestick

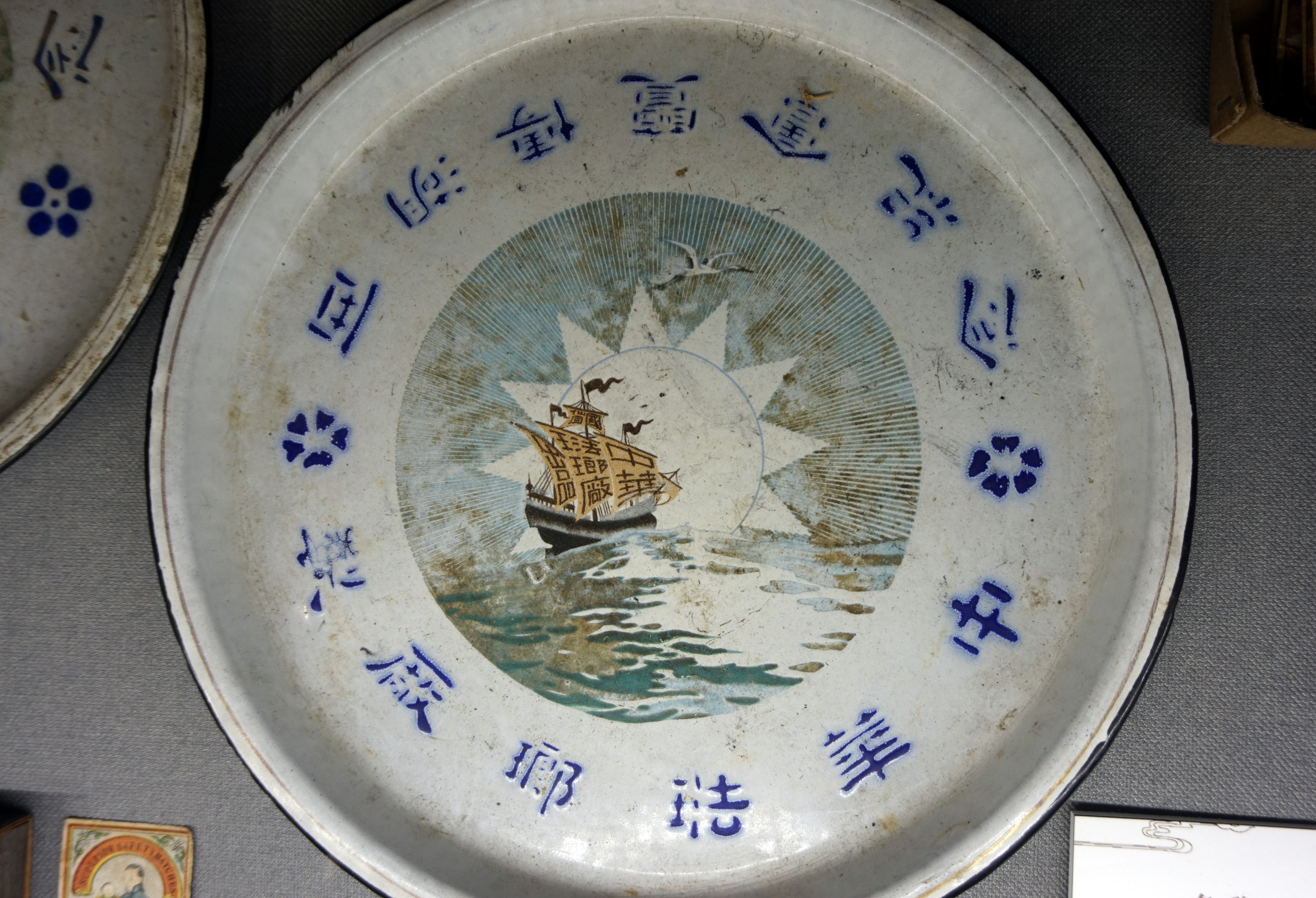
China's Yiwu West Lake Expo commemorative enamel plate

== See also ==
- National first-grade museums of China
