= Memorial of the War to Resist US Aggression and Aid Korea =

War museum in Dandong, Liaoning, China

Memorial Hall of the War to Resist US Aggression and Aid Korea
- 抗美援朝纪念馆
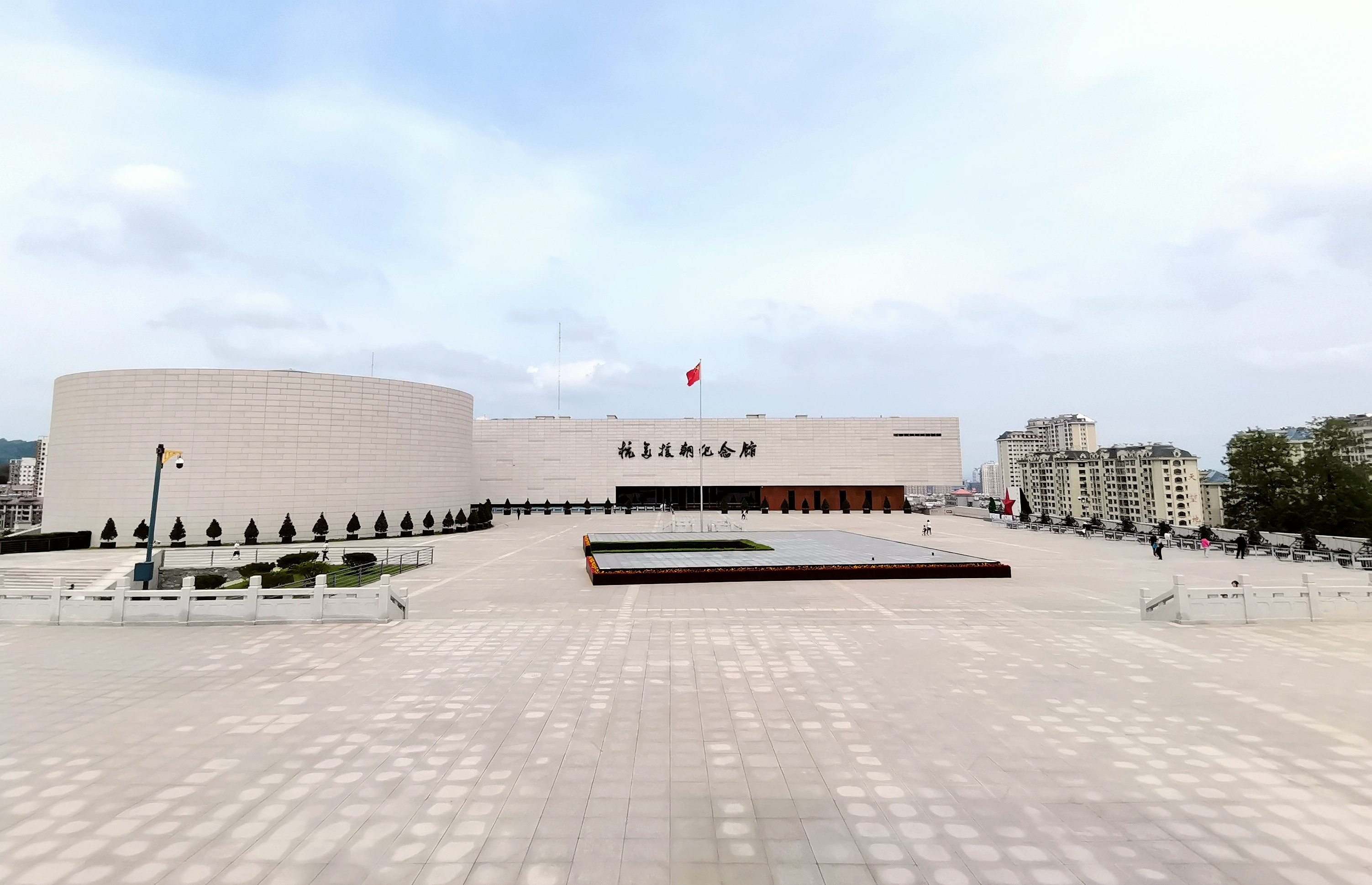
- Entrance to the museum, with a field gun in front

- Location of the museum Memorial of the War to Resist US Aggression and Aid Korea (China)
- Established: 1958
- Location: Dandong, Liaoning, China
- Coordinates: 40.1196°N 124.3668°E
- Type: War museum
- Website: www.kmycjng.com

The Memorial Hall of the War to Resist US Aggression and Aid Korea (Chinese: 抗美援朝纪念馆; pinyin: Kàngměi Yuáncháo Jìniànguǎn), also translated as the Korean War Museum, is a museum in Dandong, Liaoning, China, the only official museum in China that memorializes the Korean War (called the "War to Resist US Aggression and Aid Korea" in China). First established in 1953, it was rebuilt at its current location in October 1990, and opened on 27 July 1993, the 40th anniversary of the Panmunjom armistice. The museum was closed for refurbishment from 2014 to 9 September 2020.

== History ==
The memorial is the only official museum about the Korean War in China. It was first established in 1958 as an annex of the local history museum of Dandong, Liaoning Province, which is China's main border city with North Korea and played a critical role in the Korean War. Construction for a much grander building began in October 1990, and the new museum was opened on 27 July 1993 to commemorate the 40th anniversary of the Panmunjom armistice.

The museum spent more than 10 years collecting all the names of the Chinese People's Volunteer Army soldiers killed in the war. In 2006, it announced that it had collected 183,108 names, which has become an authoritative death count of Chinese soldiers in the Korean War. The museum plans to build a "martyrs' wall" inscribing the complete list of names.

In 2008, the memorial was included in the first batch of 83 national first-grade museums of China. In November 2013, however, it was demoted to a second-grade museum in a reassessment. The museum was closed in 2014 for a major refurbishment. It was reopened on 9 September, 2020. On 24 October 2026, North Korean leader Kim Jong Un visited the museum with Chinese People's Political Consultative Conference National Committee chairman Wang Huning and Central Foreign Affairs Commission Office director and foreign minister Wang Yi, and laid a floral tribute.

== Location and facilities ==
The museum is located on Mount Yinghua north of downtown Dandong, overlooking the North Korean city of Sinuiju across the Yalu River. It consists of three major structures: the main exhibition hall, a panoramic painting hall, and a memorial tower, surrounded by a 50,000-square-metre (540,000 sq ft) park. It occupies an area of 182,000 square metres (1,960,000 sq ft), with a total building floor area of 20,000 square metres (220,000 sq ft).

== Exhibitions ==
The exhibition in the main hall comprises more than 700 photographs and over 1,000 artifacts, as well as models, charts, paintings, and sculptures that explain the progress of the war. The exhibition extols the fraternity between the Chinese People's Volunteer Army and the (North) Korean People's Army and laments the sufferings of the civilian population in both Korea and China. A major focus of the museum is the sufferings of the Chinese prisoners of war held in the Geoje prison camp in South Korea, with photographs showing Chinese POWs who had anti-Communist slogans forcibly tattooed on them.

The panoramic painting hall contains a giant painting depicting the Battle of the Ch'ongch'on River (1950), a decisive victory by the People's Volunteer Army. Measuring 132.15 metres (433.6 ft) long and 16 metres (52 ft) high, it was China's largest panoramic painting when the museum opened in 1993. The painting encircles a revolving viewing platform in the centre of the hall.

The memorial tower is 53 metres (174 ft) tall, which signifies the year 1953, when the Korean Armistice Agreement was signed. The tower's name is written in the calligraphy of Deng Xiaoping.
