= Zhengzhou Museum =

Museum in Henan Province, China

- 郑州博物馆
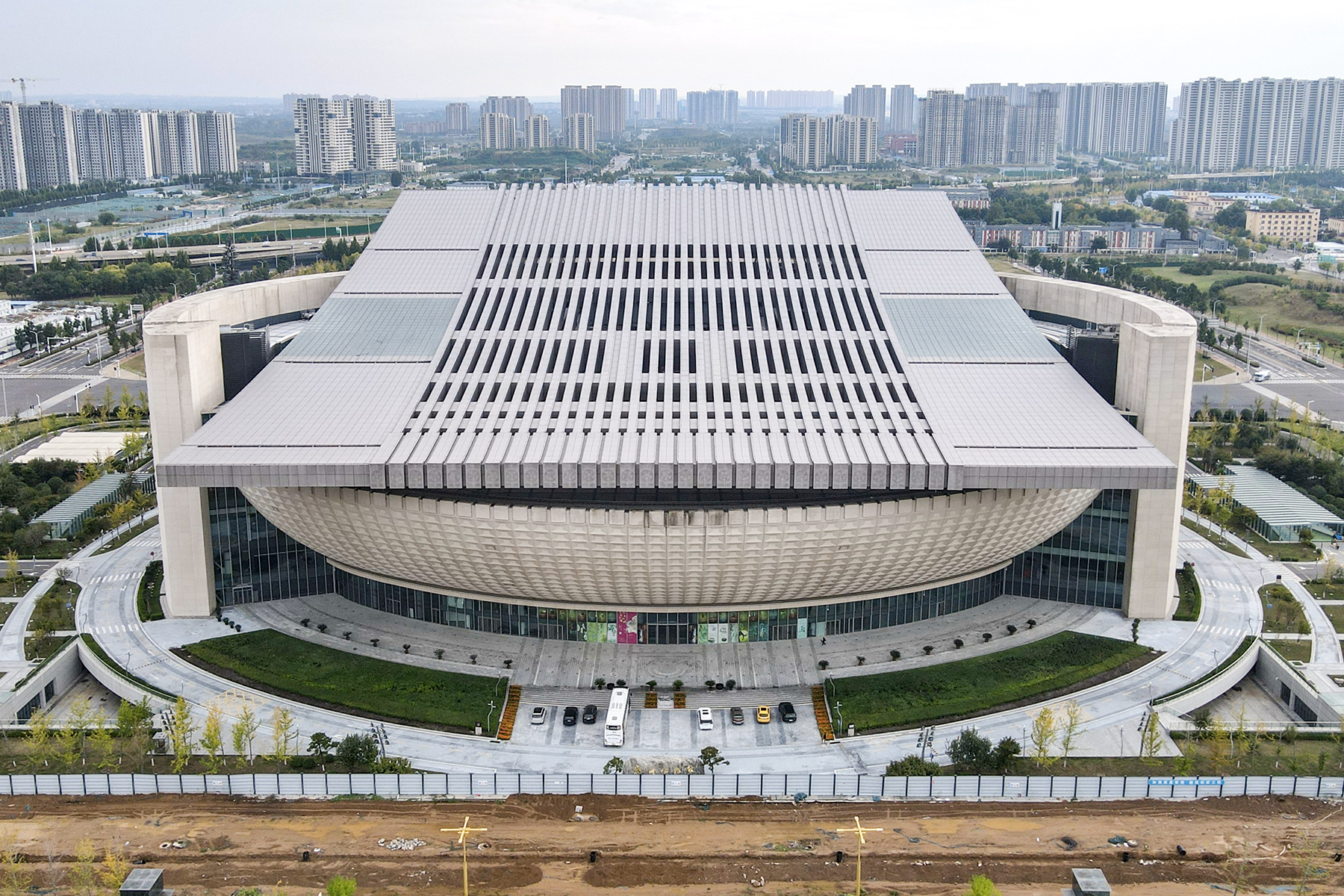
- Wen Han Street building, Zhengzhou Museum
- Former name: Zhengzhou Cultural Relics Exhibition Hall
- Established: 1 July 1957
- Location: Songshan Road building No. 168 South Songshan Road, Zhengzhou, Henan, China; 34.7464°N 113.6214°E Wen Han Street building Wen Han Street, Zhongyuan District, Zhengzhou, Henan, China; 34.7406°N 113.5409°E
- Website: www.hnzzmuseum.com

The Zhengzhou Museum (Chinese: 郑州博物馆) is a museum located in Zhengzhou, Henan Province, China. Originally built in 1957 and originally located in Bishagang Park, the museum now includes two buildings, one relocated from the original in 1998 and located on South Songshan Road, and the other newly constructed in 2021 and located on Wen Han Street. The museum has a collection of over 60,000 items.

== History ==
Established on July 1, 1957, the museum was first named Zhengzhou Cultural Relics Exhibition Hall, initially located in the Martyrs' Mausoleum in the cemetery of the fallen soldiers of the Northern Expeditionary Army built by Feng Yuxiang, located in Bishagang Park. In 1962, the name was changed to Zhengzhou Museum. In December 1999, the museum moved to No. 168 South Songshan Road. On April 30, 2021, a new building for the Zhengzhou Museum was completed, located on Wen Han Street.

== Buildings ==
Originally located in Bishagang Park, the Zhengzhou Museum covered an area of 4,330 square meters and was divided into two courtyards, the front and back. After the relocation in 1998, as of 2022, the Songshan Road building has a floor area of 10,000 square meters, of which the main pavilion is 8,337 square meters, based on the shape of a Shang Dynasty bronze square Ding unearthed in Zhengzhou, taking the symbolism of "Ding standing in the center of the country".

With a total floor area of 147,000 square meters, the Wen Han Street building is the first museum in China to use link beam dampers in its main structure, and the museum's appearance looks like a crown. The building has an exhibition area of about 36,000 square meters, with 21 exhibition halls, displaying cultural relics from the Central Plains from the Paleolithic Age to modern times.

== Collection ==
Zhengzhou Museum is the first prefecture-level museum built in Henan Province after the founding of the People's Republic of China, and is also one of the first Chinese first-grade museums, with a collection of nearly 60,000 items. Notable artifacts include Neolithic pottery, Shang and Zhou bronzes, Tang and Song stone carvings, and ceramics through the ages.
