= Jilin Provincial Museum =

- 吉林省博物院
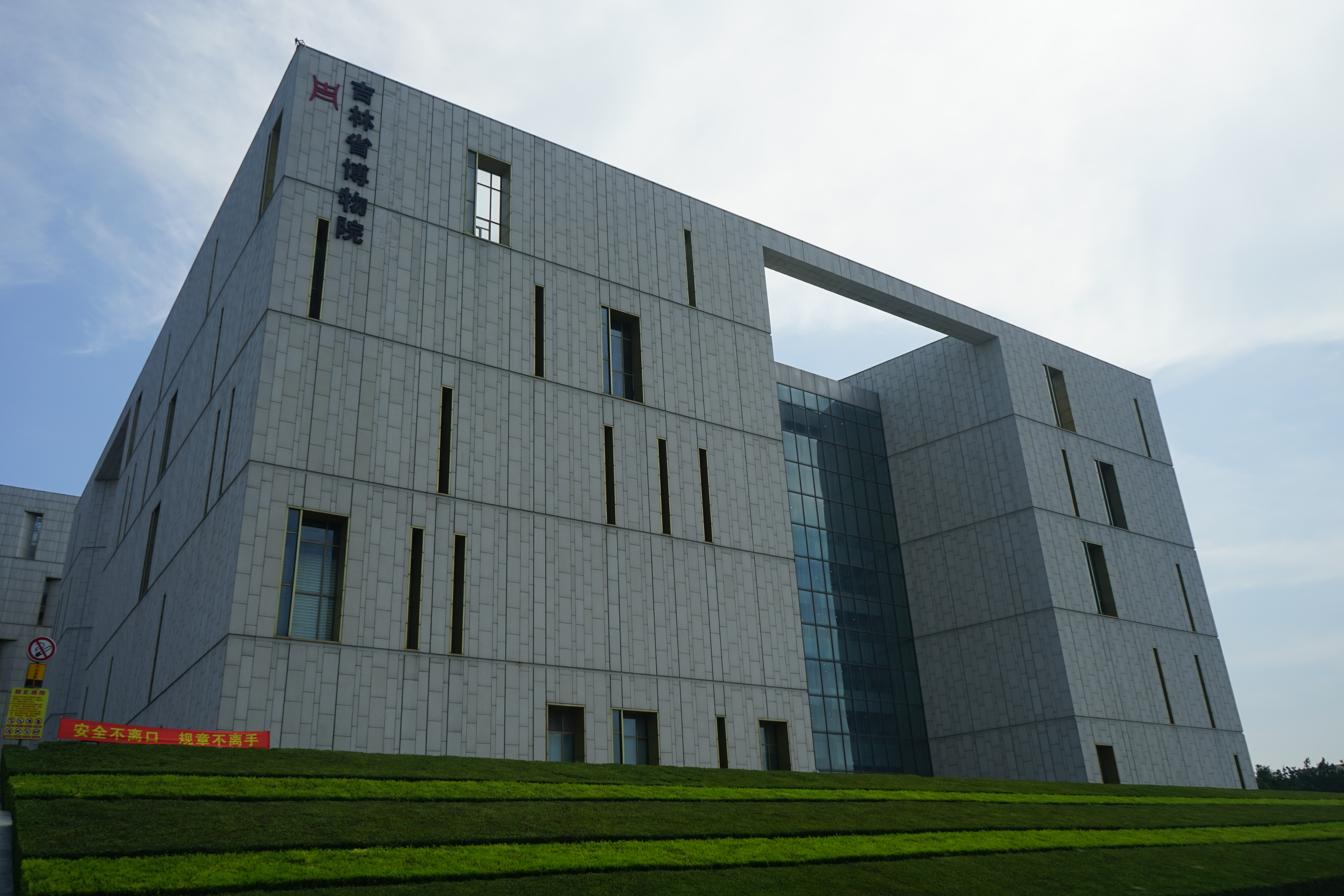
- Jilin Provincial Museum

- Location of the museum in Jilin
- Established: 14 February 2004
- Location: Nanguan District, Changchun, Jilin, China
- Coordinates: 43°46′06″N 125°26′00″E
- Type: Provincial museum
- Key holdings: Cultural relics from Buyeo, Balhae, and Goguryeo; the Zhang Boju and Pan Su art collection
- Collection size: approx. 120,000 objects
- President: Li Gang (李刚)
- Website: jlmuseum.net
- Floor area: 32,000 m^{2} (340,000 sq ft)
- Previous names: Jílín shěng bówùguǎn 吉林省博物馆

The Jilin Provincial Museum (simplified Chinese: 吉林省博物院; traditional Chinese: 吉林省博物院; pinyin: Jílín shěng bówùyuàn) is a first-grade museum in Changchun, Jilin province, China, dedicated to history and art. It is a subordinate unit of the Jilin Province Department of Culture and Tourism.

== History ==
The Jilin Provincial Museum was founded in 1951 and formally opened in Jilin City in 1952. In 1954, the provincial government seat was moved to Changchun, and the Jilin Provincial Museum followed it. In 2012, the museum was listed as a national first-grade museum. After nine years of construction, the museum moved to its present location on Yongshun Road (Chinese: 永顺路; pinyin: Yǒngshùn lù), Nanguan District, in 2016.

== Collection ==
Artefacts from the Goguryeo and Balhae kingdoms, as well as the Khitan Liao and Jurchen dynasties, make up a large proportion of the museum's collection. In addition, the museum has a large number of calligraphic art pieces from various historical periods, including the modern era, and cultural relics from the Northeast Anti-Japanese United Army.

The museum collection includes:

- Two scrolls painted by the Northern Song poet Su Shi
- 'Hundred Flower Painting' (Chinese: 百花图; pinyin: Bǎihuā tú) by the Southern Song painter Yang Jieyu (杨婕妤)
- 'Wenji returns to Han' by the Jurchen dynasty painter Jin Zhangyu (金张瑀)
- 'Lin Li Gonglin's Nine Songs' by the Yuan dynasty painter Zhang Wo

Some of the museums artefacts include:

- The 'Bing Wu Shen Gou' (丙午神钩), a silver belt hook with gold gilding from Buyeo
- Bronze mirrors with Khitan script
- A painted, stone-cut Khitan pagoda
- Murals from the Khitan Kulun tombs

A collaborative exhibition between Jilin Provincial Museum and the Northeast Anti-Japanese United Army Memorial Hall called 'Souls of the Black Earth Army: Military History of the North-east Anti-Japanese United Army' was awarded a National Museums' 10 Great Exhibitions excellence award (2012–2013). The exhibition was designed to assist in developing a patriotic education.

== Gallery ==
Artefacts

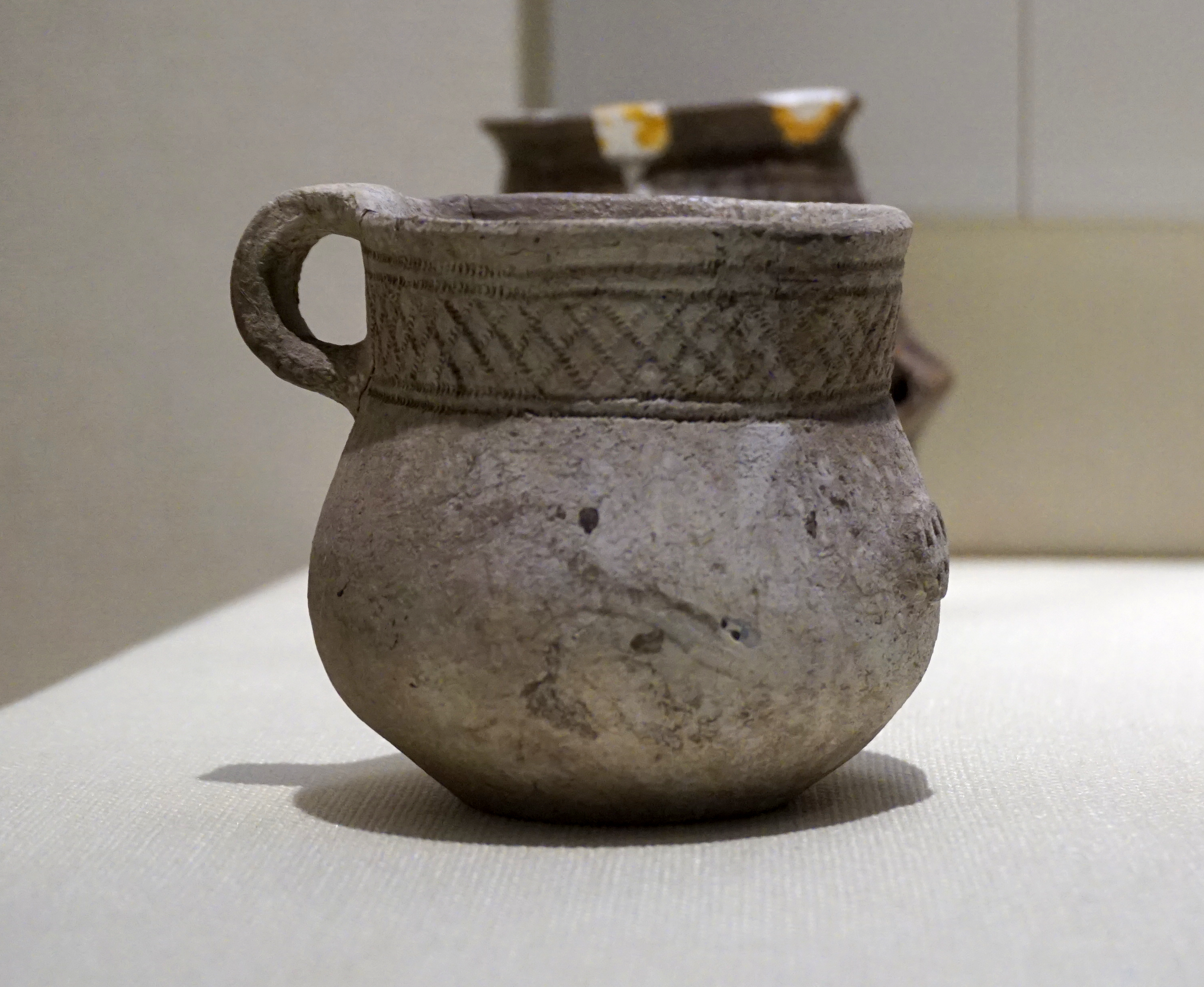
Bronze Age ceramic cup with handle from Da'anhanshu

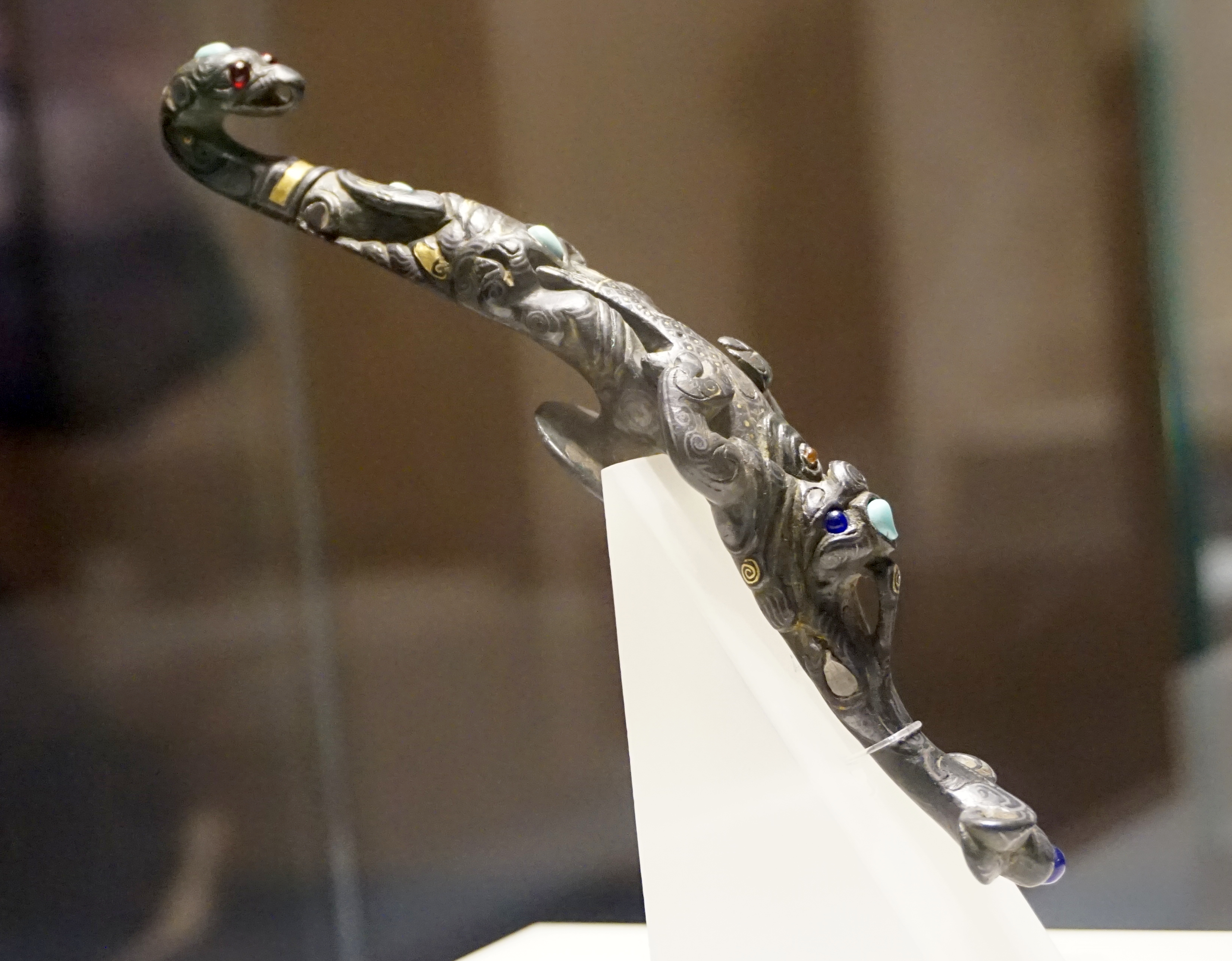
The 'Bing Wu Shen Gou', a bronze belt hook from Buyeo with silver and gold gilding

Art collection

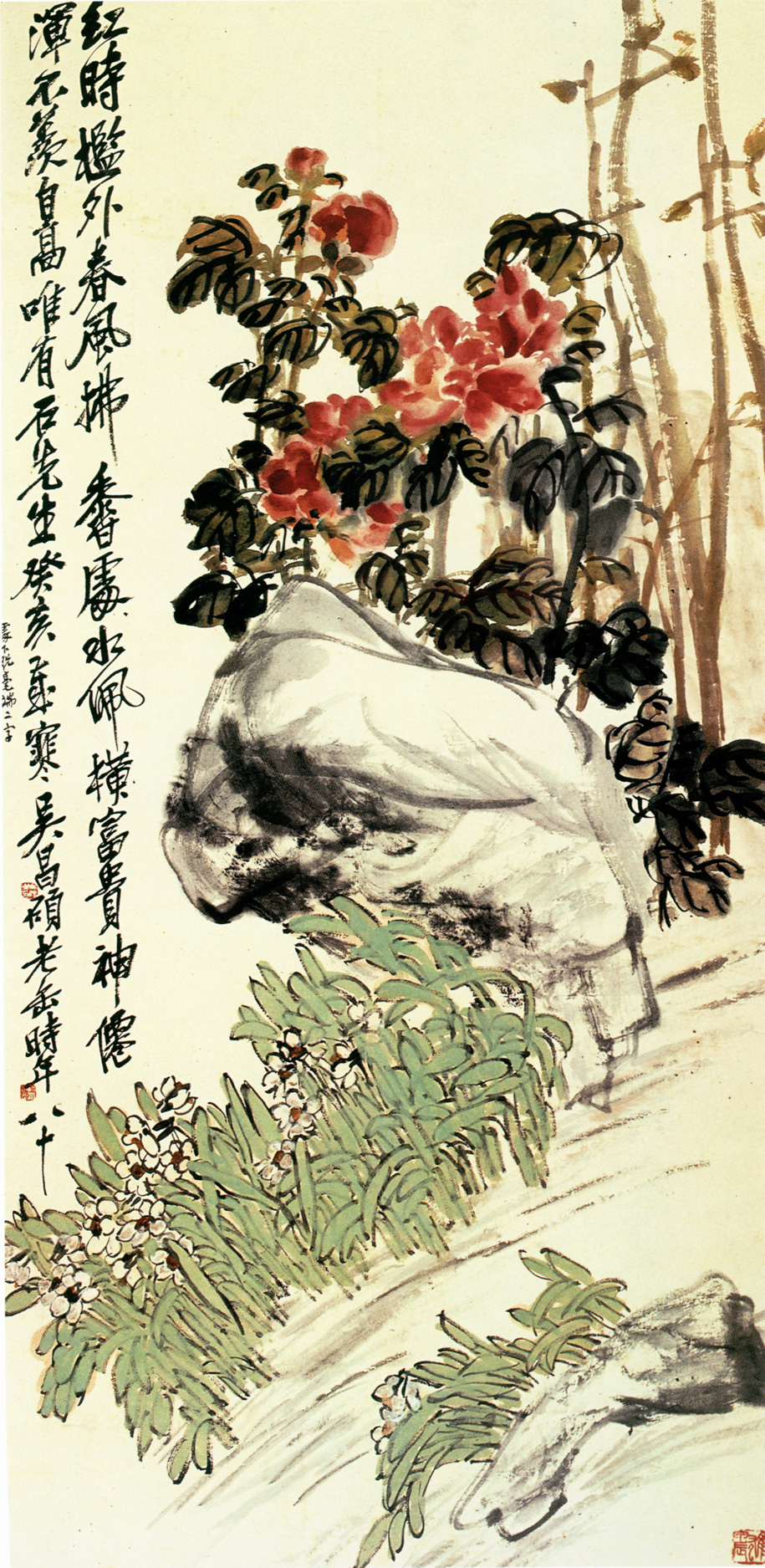
Peonies and Daffodils by the Qing dynasty artist Wu Changshuo
