= Handan Municipal Museum =

Museum in Handan, Hebei, China

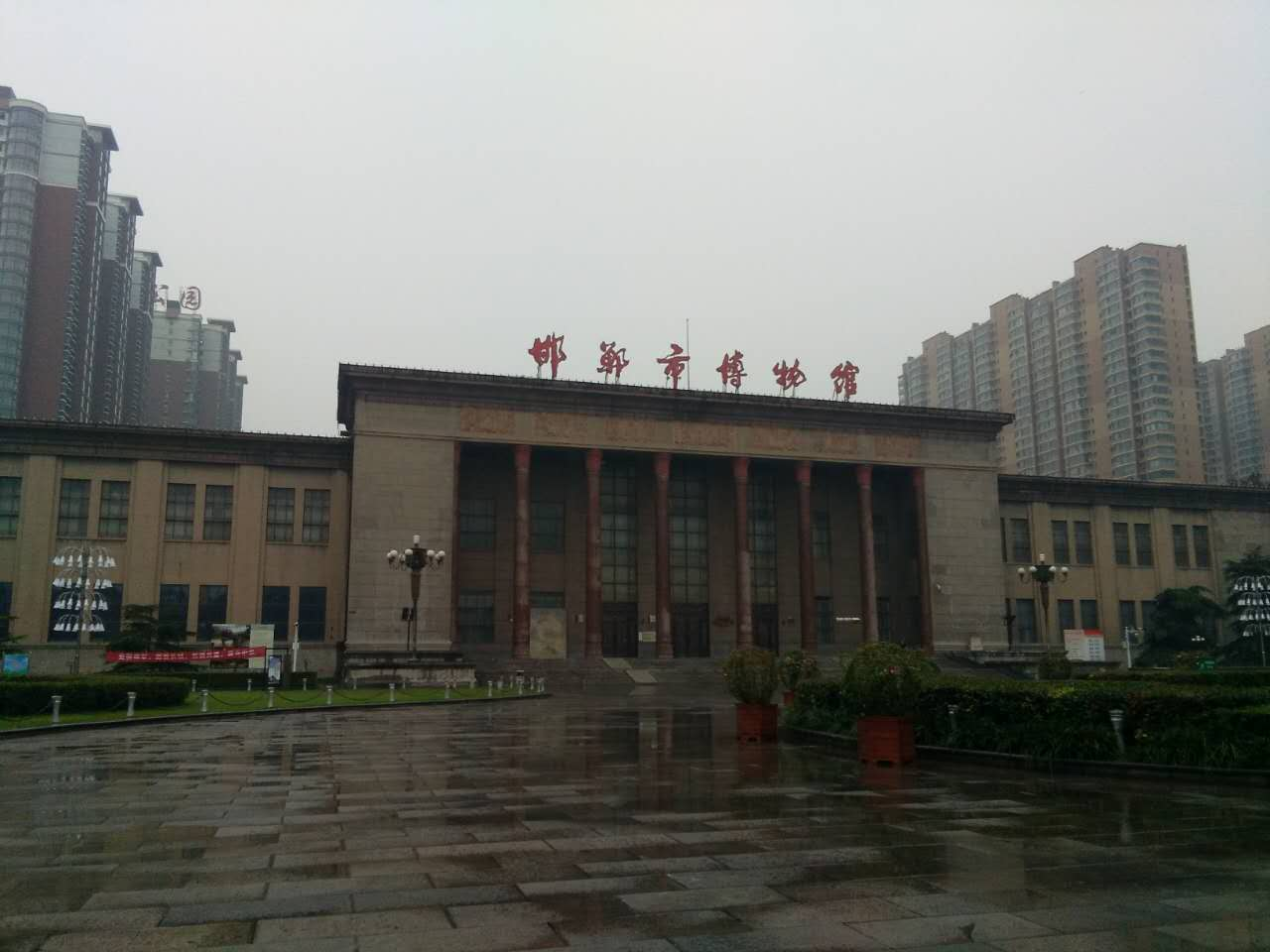
- Established: December 1968
- Location: Handan, Hebei
- Website: www.hdmuseum.org

The Handan Municipal Museum (simplified Chinese: 邯郸市博物馆; traditional Chinese: 邯鄲市博物館), also known as Handan Museum, is a Hebei-based comprehensive museum located at No. 45 Zhonghua North Street, Handan City, Hebei Province.

Handan Municipal Museum began construction in June 1968 and was completed in December of that year, and its main building was formerly known as the "Handan Exhibition Hall of Long Live the Victory of Mao Zedong Thought" (毛泽东思想胜利万岁邯郸展览馆), which was changed to its present name in 1984.

On November 13, 2020, the new building of Handan Municipal Museum was officially opened.
