= List of museums in China =

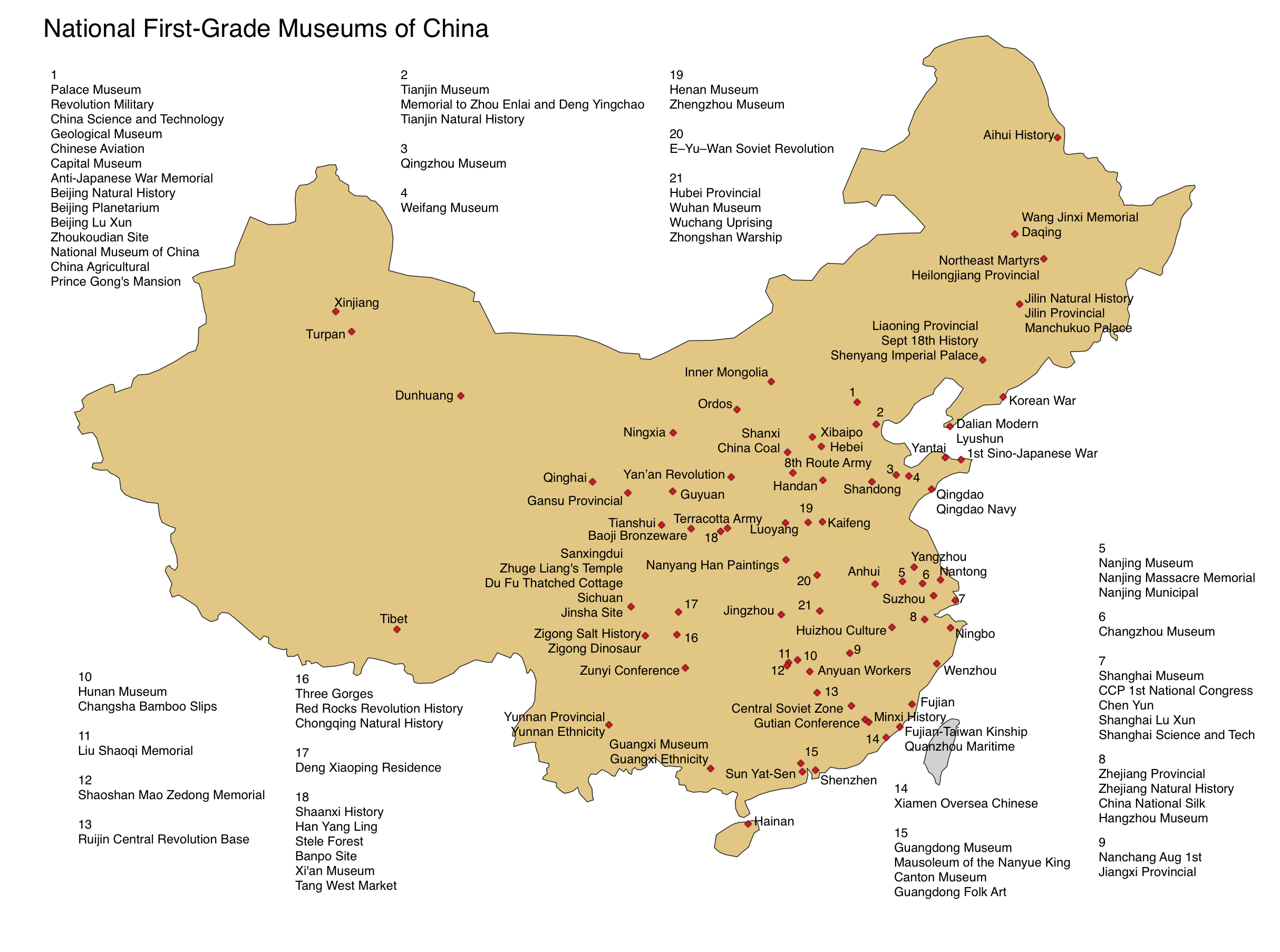
China 1st-Grade National Museums

As of 2025, there are 7,048 museums in China, including 3,054 state-owned museums (museums run by national and local government or universities) and 535 private museums. In 2021, the nation's museums saw approximately 779 million visitors. Some museums of cultural relics, such as the Museum of Qin Terracotta Warriors and Horses in Xi'an, have become internationally known tourist attractions. The government has exchanges of cultural relics exhibitions between museums and promotes the display and exchanges of legal non-governmental collections. The museums are classified into several grades, with the national first-grade museums being the highest classification.

== List ==
Below is a list of museums in China grouped by the provinces or municipalities where they are located.

=== Anhui ===
- Anhui Provincial Museum
- Anhui Hall of Fame
- Anhui Paleontology Fossil Museum
- Bengbu Museum
- China Huizhou Tax Museum
- Ma'anshan Museum
- She County Museum

=== Beijing ===
- Beijing Ancient Architecture Museum
- Beijing Folk Arts Museum
- Beijing Liao and Jin City Wall Museum
- Beijing Museum of Contemporary Art
- Beijing Planning Exhibition Hall
- Capital Museum
- China Agricultural Museum
- China Civil Aviation Museum
- China Museum of Telecommunications
- China National Film Museum
- China National Post and Postage Stamp Museum
- China Numismatic Museum
- China Printing Museum
- China Railway Museum
- China Science and Technology Museum
- Dabaotai Western Han Dynasty Mausoleum
- Digital Beijing Building
- Geological Museum of China
- Guanfu Museum (private)
- International Friendship Museum
- Lu Xun Museum
- Military Museum of the Chinese People's Revolution
- Ming City Wall Relics Park
- Museum of the War of Chinese People's Resistance Against Japanese Aggression
- Museum of the Communist Party of China
- National Art Museum of China
- National Museum of China
- National Natural History Museum of China
- Palace Museum (Forbidden City)
- Paleozoological Museum of China
- Shangyuan Art Museum
- Western Zhou Yan State Capital Museum
- Madame Tussauds Beijing

=== Chongqing ===
- Baiheliang Underwater Museum
- Chongqing Art Museum
- Chongqing Museum of Natural History
- Chongqing Science and Technology Museum
- Chongqing Sichuan Opera Museum
- General Joseph W. Stilwell Museum
- Red Rock Village Museum
- Three Gorges Museum
- Madame Tussauds Chongqing

=== Fujian ===
- Fujian Museum, Fuzhou
- Guanfu Museum (private), Xiamen
- Jinjiang Museum, Jinjiang
- Quanzhou Museum
- Quanzhou Maritime Museum, which houses the Quanzhou ship

=== Gansu ===
- Dunhuang County Museum
- Gansu Provincial Museum, Lanzhou
- Lanzhou Museum, Lanzhou
- Silk Route Museum

=== Guangdong ===
- Dongguan Science and Technology Museum
- Guangdong Museum, Guangzhou
- Nanyue King Museum, Guangzhou
- Guangdong Museum of Art, Guangzhou
- Guangdong Museum of Revolutionary History
- Guangdong Provincial Museum, Guangzhou
- Jupiter Museum of Art, Shenzhen
- Longgang Museum of Hakka Culture, Longgang
- Pagoda Park Cultural Revolution Museum
- Shenzhen Museum, Shenzhen
- Shenzhen Museum of Contemporary Art and Urban Planning, Shenzhen
- Wangye Museum, Shenzhen

=== Guangxi ===
- Guangxi Museum
- Anthropology Museum Of Guangxi
- Liuzhou Museum
- Museum of Guihai Tablets Forest

=== Guizhou ===
- Guuzhou Provincial Museum

=== Hainan ===
- Hainan Provincial Museum

=== Hebei ===
- Hebei Provincial Museum
- Shijiazhuang Art Museum

=== Harbin ===
- Harbin Museum of Jewish History and Culture

=== Heilongjiang ===
- Heilongjiang Provincial Museum

=== Henan ===
- Henan Museum, Zhengzhou
- Luoyang Museum, Luoyang
- Guo State Museum, Sanmenxia

=== Hubei ===
- Hubei Provincial Museum
- Wuhan Museum
- Underground Project 131, Xianning Prefecture
- Yifu Museum of China University of Geosciences
- Madame Tussauds Wuhan

=== Hunan ===
- Hunan Provincial Museum, Changsha
- Changsha Museum, Changsha
- Changsha Bamboo Slips Museum, Changsha
- Qin Dynasty Bamboo Slips Museum of Liye, Longshan County

=== Inner Mongolia ===
- Inner Mongolia Museum, Hohhot
- Hohhot City Museum, Hohhot

=== Jiangsu ===
==== Nanjing ====
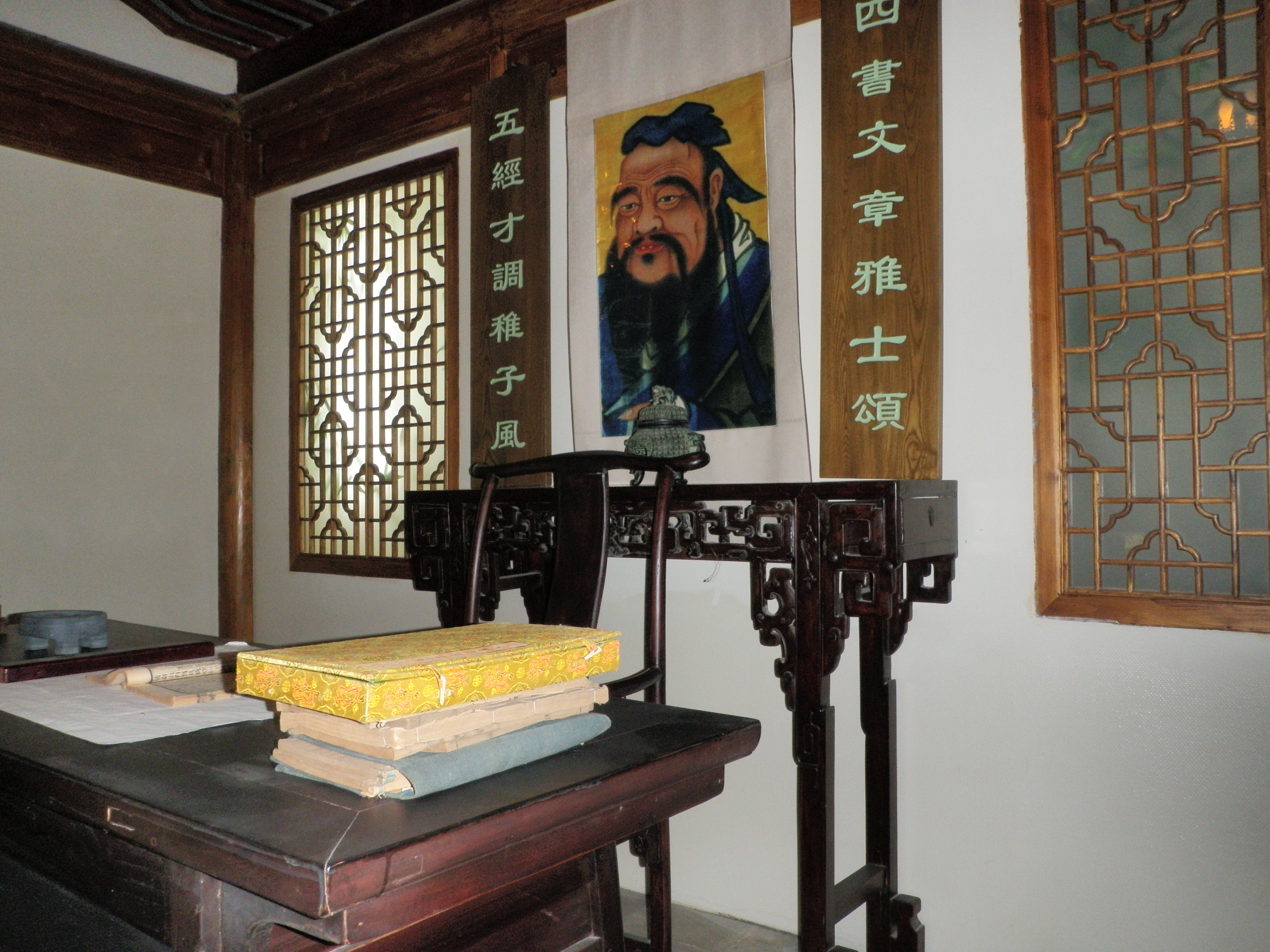
Mock classroom of a traditional Confucius private school in China. Taken at the Nanjing Educational Museum at Nanjing Number 1 Middle School.

- China Modern History Museum
- Nanjing Museum
- Nanjing Municipal Museum
- Nanjing Massacre Memorial Hall
- Nanjing Museum of the Site of the Lijixiang Comfort Stations
- Taiping Heavenly Kingdom History Museum

==== Suzhou ====
- Suzhou Museum
- Suzhou Arts and Crafts Museum
- Changzhou Museum
- Jinji Lake Art Museum
- Yangzhou Museum and China Block Printing Museum (the two are locally known as the "double museum", as they share the lobby section)
- Zhenjiang Museum

==== Xuzhou ====
- Xuzhou Museum
- Xuzhou Decree Museum
- Cultural Site of Han Dynasty
  - Lion Hill Chu Prince Mausoleum
  - Aquatic Terracotta Warrior Museum
  - Museum of Terra Cotta Warriors and Horses of The Han Dynasty
  - Han Dynasty Stone Relief Gallery
  - Han Dynasty Cultural and Artistic Museum

==== Other cities ====
- The Museum of Guangling King's Tomb in Han Dynasty, Yangzhou
- Nantong Museum, Nantong
- The Old Museum of Wisteria, Changzhou
- Red Army Memorial Museum, Rugao

=== Jiangxi ===
- Jiujiang British Concession Museum
- Jiujiang Museum
- Jiujiang Folk Culture Museum
- Jiujiang Urban Planning Exhibition Centre
- Jiujiang Fine Arts Museum
- Jiujiang Forest Museum

=== Jilin ===
- Museum of the Imperial Palace of the Manchu State, Changchun
- Jilin Provincial Museum
- Jilin University Museum

=== Liaoning ===
- Liaoning Provincial Museum
- Dalian Natural History Museum
- Dalian Modern Museum
- Shenyang Steam Locomotive Museum

=== Macau ===
- Communications Museum
- Fire Services Museum
- Grand Prix Museum
- Macao Tea Culture House
- Macau Museum of Art
- Macau Wine Museum
- Maritime Museum
- Museum of Macau
- Museum of Sacred Art and Crypt
- Museum of Taipa and Coloane History
- Natural and Agrarian Museum
- Sun Yat Sen Memorial House
- Taipa Houses-Museum

=== Ningxia ===
- Ningxia Museum
- Yinchuan Museum of Contemporary Art

=== Qinghai ===
- Liuwan Museum of Ancient Painted Pottery, Ledu

=== Shaanxi ===
- Shaanxi History Museum, Xi'an
- Xi'an Stele Forest Museum, Beilin, Xi'an
- Terracotta Army, Xi'an
- Xi'an Banpo Museum, Xi'an
- Maoling Museum, Xianyang
- Xi'an Museum (within grounds of Jianfu Temple), Xi'an
- Xianyang Museum, Xianyang
- Baoji Bronzeware Museum, Baoji
- HanYangLing Mausoleum Museum, Xi'an

=== Shandong ===
- Shandong Art Museum
- Shandong Provincial Museum
- Shandong Science & Technology Museum
- Jinan Museum
- Qingdao Municipal Museum

=== Shanghai ===
- Aurora Art Museum
- China Art Museum
- China Maritime Museum
- Chinese Comfort Women History Museum
- C. Y. Tung Maritime Museum
- Fotografiska Shanghai
- Museum of Contemporary Art Shanghai
- Power Station of Art
- Rockbund Art Museum
- Shanghai Art Collection Museum
- Shanghai Entomological Museum
- Shanghai Film Museum
- Shanghai History Museum
- Shanghai International Wine & Spirits Museum
- Shanghai Jewish Refugees Museum
- Shanghai Mazu Cultural Palace
- Shanghai Museum
- Shanghai Museum of Public Security
- Shanghai Museum of Traditional Chinese Medicine
- Shanghai Natural History Museum
- Shanghai Science and Technology Museum
- Shanghai Urban Planning Exhibition Center
- Shanghai Water Displaying Hall
- Site of the First National Congress of the Chinese Communist Party
- Yuz Museum
- Long Museum
- Guangfulin Relics Park
- Madame Tussauds Shanghai

=== Shanxi ===
- Chinese Dictionary Museum
- Shanxi Provincial Museum (Taiyuan)
- Shanxi Provincial Museum of Art (Taiyuan)
- Datong Museum (Lower Huayan Monastery of Datong)
- The Coal Museum of China (Taiyuan)

=== Sichuan ===
- Zigong Dinosaur Museum, Zigong
- Zigong Salt History Museum, Zigong
- Sichuan Science and Technology Museum, Chengdu
- Du Fu Cao Tang (Thatched Cottage of Du Fu), Chengdu
- Sanxingdui Museum
- Jinsha Site Museum
- China Colour Lantern Museum
- Jianchuan Museum Cluster
- Liu Family Estate Museum, formerly Dayi Landlord Manor Exhibition Hall, in Anren, Dayi County

=== Tianjin ===
- Tianjin Museum
- Memorial to Zhou Enlai and Deng Yingchao, Tianjin
- Tianjin Natural History Museum（Musée Hoangho Paiho）
- National Maritime Museum of China
- Tianjin Museum of Modern History

=== Tibet Autonomous Region ===
- Tibet Museum

=== Xinjiang ===
- Xinjiang Uyghur Autonomous Region Museum
- Khotan Cultural Museum
- Turpan Museum

=== Yunnan ===
- Lufeng Dinosaur Museum
- Yunnan Provincial Museum
- Yunnan Nationalities Museum
- Kunming Natural History Museum of Zoology
- Yunnan Railway Museum Kunming.

=== Zhejiang ===
- Zhejiang Provincial Museum, Hangzhou
- Zhejiang Museum of Natural History
- Hangzhou Southern Song Dynasty Guan Kiln Museum
- Hangzhou World Numismatic Museum
- Liangzhu Culture Museum
- China National Tea Museum, Hangzhou
- China National Silk Museum, Hangzhou
- Zhoushan Museum
- China Finance and Taxation Museum
- China Shoes Museum, Wenzhou
- China Grand Canal Museum
- The National Sauce Culture Museum of China
- Traditional Chinese Medicine Museum, Hangzhou
- Chinese Seal Museum, Hangzhou

== See also ==
- Libraries in China
- List of universities in China
- List of World Heritage Sites in China
- List of tourist attractions in China
