= Army Museum =

Army Museum may refer to:

- Army Museum (Moldova), museum in Chișinău, Moldova
- Army Museum of Western Australia, established in 1977, and located in an historic artillery barracks in Fremantle, Western Australia
- Lewis Army Museum, U.S. military museum at Fort Lewis in the state of Washington, U.S. It is housed in the historic former Red Shield Inn, is the only certified U.S. Army museum on the West Coast of America.
- National Army Museum, British Army's central museum. It was established by royal charter in 1960, and is located in the Chelsea, London
- National Army Museum (New Zealand), opened in October 1978 and is located 94 minutes south of Taupo on State Highway One, on the southern side of the small military town of Waiouru
- Pakistan Army Museum, was opened on 24 October 1961 and is located in Rawalpindi
- People's Liberation Army Museum. The Museum of the Sahrawi people's Liberation Army is located in the Sahrawi refugee camps, in the south-west of Algeria.
- Polish Army Museum, created in 1920, it occupies a wing of the building of the Polish National Museum in Warsaw
- Polish Home Army Museum, Orchard Lake, Michigan, dedicated on 12 November 1989 to the memory of the men and women of the Armia Krajowa during World War II. It is located in Orchard Lake, Michigan
- Republic of China Air Force Museum in Kaohsiung, Taiwan
- Republic of China Armed Forces Museum in Taipei, Taiwan
- Roman Army Museum, located in the ruined Roman Fort at Carvoran, Greenhead, Northumberland, England. It displays genuine Roman artefacts including weapons and tools; life size replicas; films, a large timeline of Hadrian's Wall.
- Royal Netherlands Army Museum, currently based in the Armamentarium in Delft but is due to move to a new location at Soesterberg
- Swedish Army Museum, a museum of military history located in the district of Östermalm in Stockholm. It reopened in 2002.
- U. S. Army Museum of Hawaii, housed inside Battery Randolph, a former coastal artillery battery, located at Fort DeRussy Military Reservation.

See also

- Army Medical Museum and Library
- Army Medical Services Museum, located in the Defence Medical Services Training Centre, Keogh Barracks, on Mytchett Place Road in Mytchett.
- Australian Army Artillery Museum
- Museum of Army Chaplaincy
- Museum of Army Flying
- Museum of Army Transport, was a museum of British Army vehicles in Beverley, East Riding of Yorkshire, England
- National Museum of the United States Army
- Army Quartermaster Museum
- United States Army Ordnance Museum
- Army Medical Museum (Saint Petersburg)
- Red Army Memorial Museum, Chinese Army Museum, and is located in Red Army Park, at Rugao, China.
- Royal Australian Armoured Corps Memorial and Army Tank Museum
- Royal Museum of the Armed Forces and Military History
- U.S. Army Transportation Museum, museum of vehicles and other transportation -related equipment and ...
- United States Army Aviation Museum, an aviation museum located on Fort Rucker near Ozark, Alabama.
- United States Army Medical Department Museum (AMEDD Museum), location, Fort Sam Houston, San Antonio, Texas
- United States Army Women's Museum, is located in Fort Lee, Virginia
