= Ben Howe =

Ben Howe may refer to:

- Ben Howe (politician)
- Ben Howe (artist)
- Ben Howe (speedway rider)
