= CNFM =

CNFM may refer to:

- Cambridge and Newmarket FM, the original name of British radio station Heart Cambridge
- China National Film Museum
- Commander Naval Forces Marianas, also known as COMNAVMARIANAS
