= Suzhou Arts and Crafts Museum =

Museum in Suzhou, Jiangsu, China

Suzhou Arts and Crafts Museum (Chinese: 苏州工艺美术博物馆; pinyin: sūzhōu Gōngyì Měishù Bówùguǎn) was established in 2002, and officially opened to the public in January 2003. It is located in Suzhou at No. 88 Northwest Street, in a building known as "Shangzhi Tang" that date back to the reign of the Qianlong Emperor in the Qing dynasty. Also located near the museum are the Suzhou Museum of Opera and Theatre as well as the Suzhou Silk Museum.

The museum's collection, which numbers nearly one-thousand pieces, includes: modern Suzhou embroidery, sandalwood, tapestry, wood carving, stone carving, Ming dynasty-style furniture, ethnic musical instruments, antique bronze, lacquer and metal crafts.

== See also ==
- List of museums in China
