= Beijing Planning Exhibition Hall =

- 北京市规划展览馆
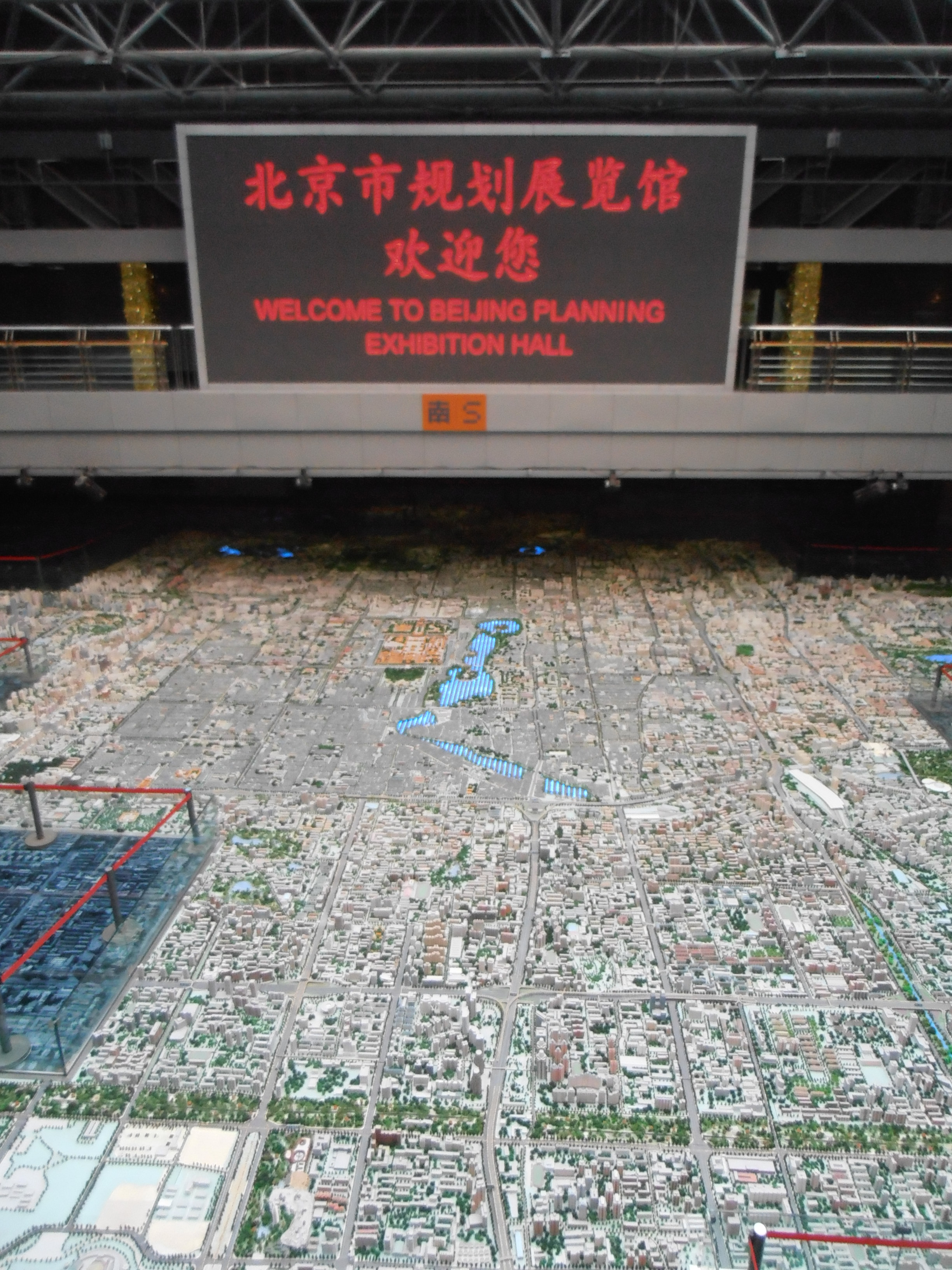
- Model of Beijing
- Established: 9 September 2004
- Location: Beijing, China
- Coordinates: 39.898416°N 116.395030°E
- Type: Urban planning museum
- Key holdings: Scale model of city
- Owner: Municipality of Beijing
- Website: www.bjghzl.com.cn

The Beijing Planning Exhibition Hall (Chinese: 北京市规划展览馆) is an urban planning museum located at 20 Qianmen E St in the old main railway station building from 1903, beside Tiananmen Square in Beijing, China. The exhibition hall opened to the public on 9 September 2004 and features a scale model of the entire Beijing metropolitan area, as well as multimedia exhibits on the history, current situation, and future of urban planning in Beijing.

== See also ==
- List of museums in China
