= China Maritime Museum =

Nautical themed museum in Shanghai, China

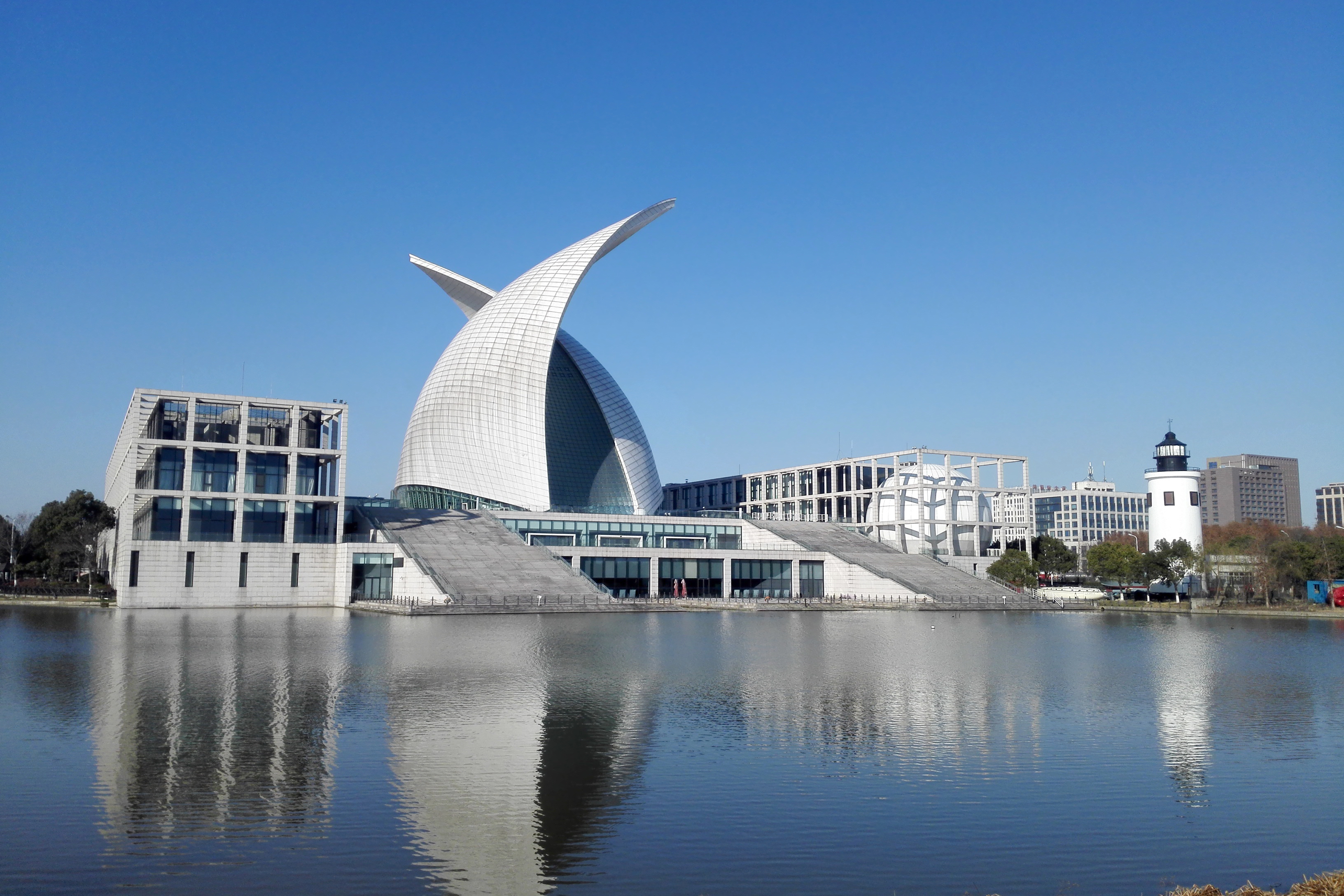
- Established: 5 July 2010
- Location: 197 Shengang Avenue, Pudong, Shanghai, China
- Coordinates: 30°53′54″N 121°54′57″E
- Type: Maritime museum
- Director: Zhao Feng
- Website: www.shmmc.com.cn

China Maritime Museum
- Simplified Chinese: 中国航海博物馆
- Traditional Chinese: 中國航海博物館
Transcriptions
Standard Mandarin
- Hanyu Pinyin: Zhōngguó hánghǎi bówùguǎn

China Maritime Museum is a maritime museum located on the bank of Dishui Lake in Pudong, Shanghai, China. Officially opened in July 2010, it is the first and largest national-level maritime museum in China.

In August 2011, the museum was rated as 4A Tourist Attraction by the China National Tourism Administration. In December 2020, it was made a National first-grade museum.

== History ==
In July 2005, a series of ceremonies were held in China to commemorate the 600th anniversary of the Ming treasure voyages. As part of the commemoration, the Chinese State Council approved the plan for constructing a national-level maritime museum in Shanghai. The preparation and construction of the museum was jointly organized by the Ministry of Transport and Shanghai Municipal People's Government. Construction started in January 2006 and finished in September 2009. The museum was officially opened to the public on 5 July 2010.

== Structure ==
The museum covers an area of 24,830 square meters, with a construction area of 46,434 square meters, an indoor exhibition area of 21,000 square meters, and an outdoor exhibition area of 6,000 square meters.

When the museum was completed, Frits Loomeijer, chairman of the International Congress of Maritime Museums, evaluated it as the largest maritime museum in the world. The top of the building is shaped like a huge white sail blown by the wind, which fits the theme of the museum.

The main exhibition area was designed by a team composed of designers from Italian Finnick, Loseri and the Genoa Maritime Museum. Due to the special shape of the building, it has high requirements for engineering . The shape of each piece of glass, steel plate and aluminum sheet are different.

== Exhibition Halls ==
The museum has six exhibition halls, namely the Maritime History Hall, the Ship Hall, the Navigation and Port Hall, the Maritime Safety Hall, the Seamen Hall, and the Military Maritime Hall.

== See also ==
- List of museums in China
- National Maritime Museum of China
