= Ningxia Museum =

Museum in Yinchuang, Ningxia, China

- 宁夏博物馆
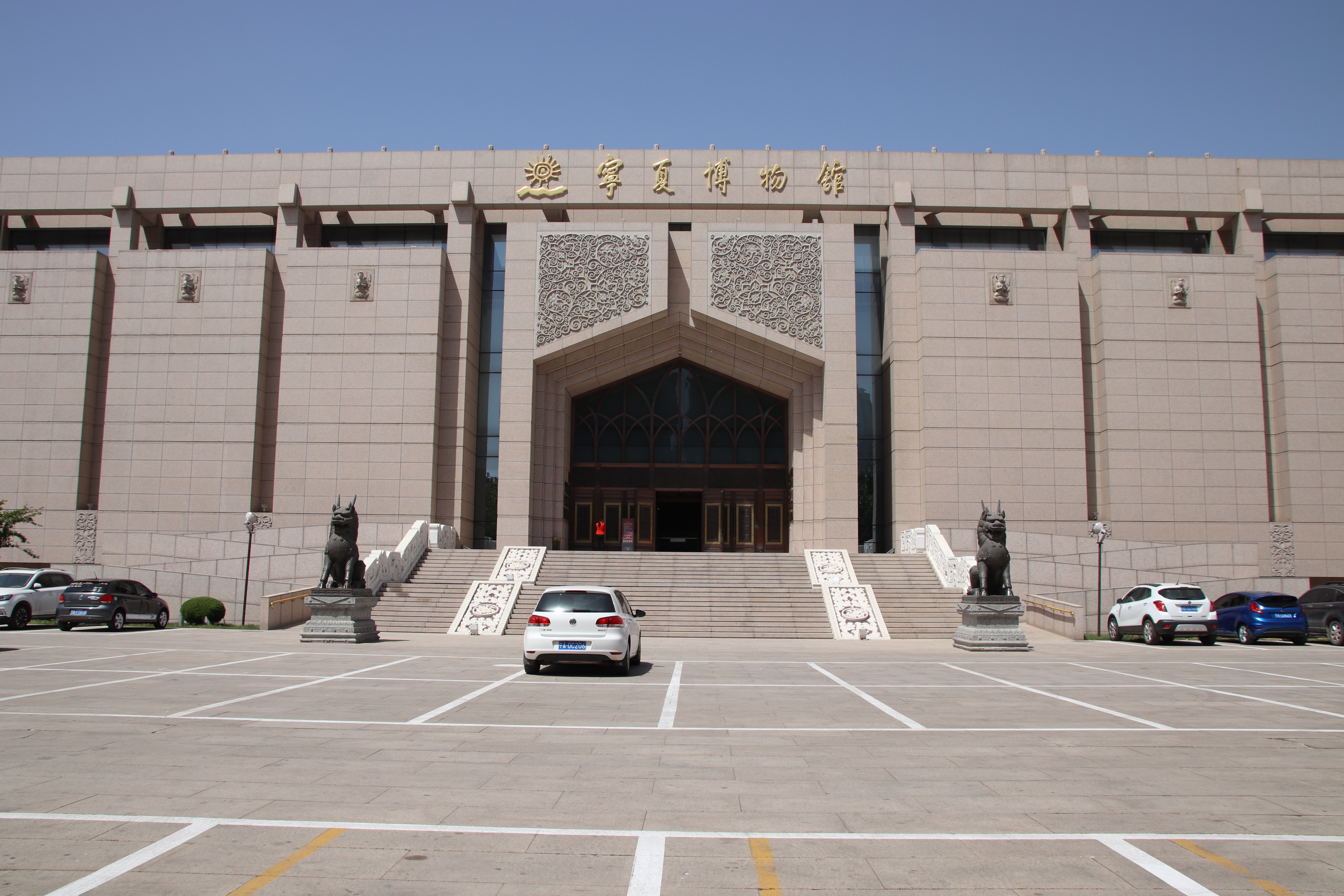
- Established: 1973 (old building); August 2008 (new building)
- Location: Jinfeng, Yinchuan, Ningxia, China
- Coordinates: 38.48448°N 106.23077°E
- Type: museum
- Website: Official website (in Chinese)

The Ningxia Museum (simplified Chinese: 宁夏博物馆; traditional Chinese: 寧夏博物館; pinyin: Níngxià Bówùguǎn) is a museum in Jinfeng District, Yinchuan, Ningxia, China.

== History ==
The original museum building was prepared in 1959 and built in 1973. Construction of a new museum building started in November 2006. The museum was re-opened on 28 August 2008 and the old site was closed.

== Architecture ==
The museum building is a three-story building with a total floor area of 30,258 m^{2}. It consists of eight exhibition halls. The building was constructed resembling the Hui (Chinese: 回) character.

== Exhibitions ==
The museum displays more than 10,000 cultural relics.

== See also ==
- List of museums in China
