= The Old Museum of Wisteria =

Museum in Changzhou, Jiangsu, China

Coordinates: 31.77732°N 119.96027°E

The Old Museum of Wisteria (Chinese: 藤花旧馆) is a small historical building and museum, where Su Shi is believed to have spent the final years of his life in Changzhou, China. It was originally known as the Sun pavilion. Records indicate that in the year 1172, the pavilion and a statue were built in memory of Su Dongpo. Originally constructed during the Ming dynasty, much of the original pavilion remains. The lintel is carved in a design known as 'Fangsheng'—bars of stone are placed on it, each having four characters carved upon it: Teng, Hua, Jiu and Guan. The present name of the museum derives from Wisteria plantings which are said to have been planted, along with begonias, by Su Dongpo himself.

== See also ==
- List of museums in China
