= Guanfu Museum =

Guanfu Museum 观复博物馆
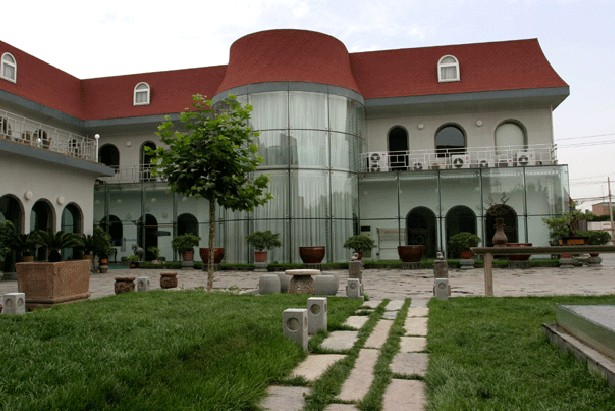
- Established: 1996 in Beijing
- Location: Beijing, China
- Coordinates: 40°00′28″N 116°32′03″E
- Type: Art museum, History museum
- Collections: Ancient Chinese ceramics, furniture, doors and windows; Contemporary Chinese oil paintings; sculptures, jade and so on.
- Curator: Ma Weidu (马未都)
- Website: http://www.guanfumuseum.org.cn/

Guanfu Museum (Chinese: 观复博物馆; pinyin: Guānfù Bówùguǎn) is an art museum in Beijing, China. It was founded by Ma Weidu on 30 October 1996, and it was among the first private museums in the People's Republic of China. The Guanfu Museum is a non-profit organization and it has a qualification of Independent Legal Entity.

== History ==
The museum was previously located on the Liulichang Street, with mostly exhibits of ceramic, domestic furniture, jade, lacquer, metalwork, closionner enamel, classical window and door, and contemporary oil painting. The museum was then moved to Nanxiaojie Street and again to Dashanzi in 2004, where the museum is currently located.

== Exhibition Halls ==
=== Ceramics Hall ===
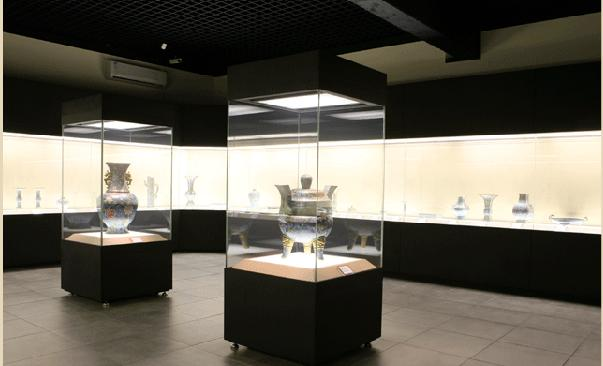
Inside the Ceramics Hall

The Ceramics Hall exhibits are masterpieces of antique Chinese ceramics that span more than 1,000 years, between the Tang and Qing dynasties. Many of the porcelain items on display represent the most typical features of the fine ceramic of the Song dynasty, especially highlights the Five Famous Kilns, namely Ru kiln, Jun kiln, Guan kiln, Ge kiln and Ding kiln. Within this exhibition, the categories include celadon, monochrome glaze and polychrome glaze, tri-colored pottery; under glaze cobalt-blue and under glaze copper red; famille-rose.

=== Furniture Hall ===
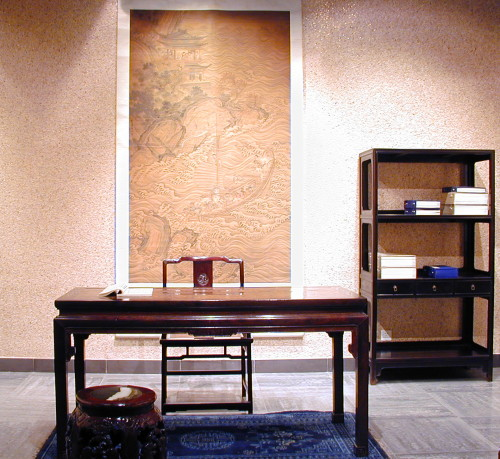
Chinese ancient study room

China has a long history of furniture-making. Furniture from the Ming and Qing periods in many ways represent the culmination of Chinese furniture-making skills, and they have various different features. Ming furniture features simple, smooth, and flowing lines, and plain and elegant ornamentation, fully bringing out the special qualities of frame-structure furniture. Influenced by China's burgeoning foreign trade and advanced craftsmanship techniques, furniture of the Qing dynasty period turned to rich and intricate ornamentation, along with coordinated engraved designs. Because of the high level of development of Chinese furniture in the Ming and Qing dynasties, most Chinese furniture design today follows in the tradition from these two periods.

The Furniture gallery in Guanfu Museum contains 6 smaller exhibiting halls and a special Chinese ancient study room, displaying over 500 pieces of furniture designed during the Ming and Qing periods.

=== Craftsmanship Hall ===
The traditional craftsmanship exhibition includes jade, gold and silver and copper artworks, cloisonne enamel, lacquer, and precious wood with the ancient technique of the 'hundred treasures inlay'. The room "Song Xi Cao Tang" restores the ancient scholar's studio.

=== Doors and Windows Hall ===
On the second floor there is an exhibition of finely carved doors and window frames. There is also new addition of a collection of oil paintings and sculptures by contemporary Chinese artists.

=== Ticketing ===
An adult ticket to this museum costs 100 RMB (available on the day of issue). Half-price ticket:50 RMB per person includes seniors (60 and over), students (except for postgraduate and PhD students), teachers, soldiers, the disabled and the staff in museum and heritage institution (Valid ID or certification is required). Free admission for children under 1.2m in height.

=== Group Tour ===
Group tour and English tour are available every day. Making reservation is recommended at least one day in advance.

=== Authentication ===
With prior appointment, the museum offers authentication with a price on objects such as ceramics and wood furniture. With extra fees, certificate can be provided on objects authenticated. The museum does not offer financial appraisal or evaluation.

== Branches ==
The Guanfu Museum now has branches in Shanghai, Hangzhou and Xiamen, with branches planned in Harbin, and Shenzhen.

== Gallery ==
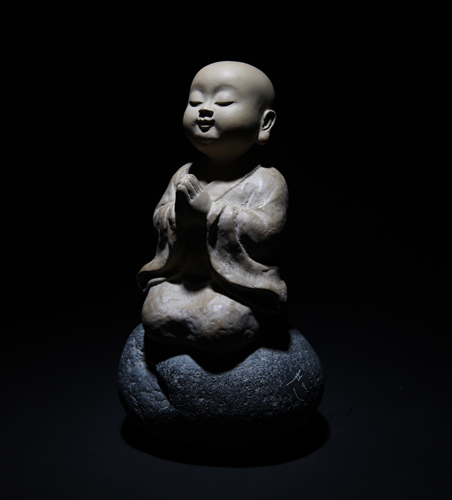
A statue of Buddha

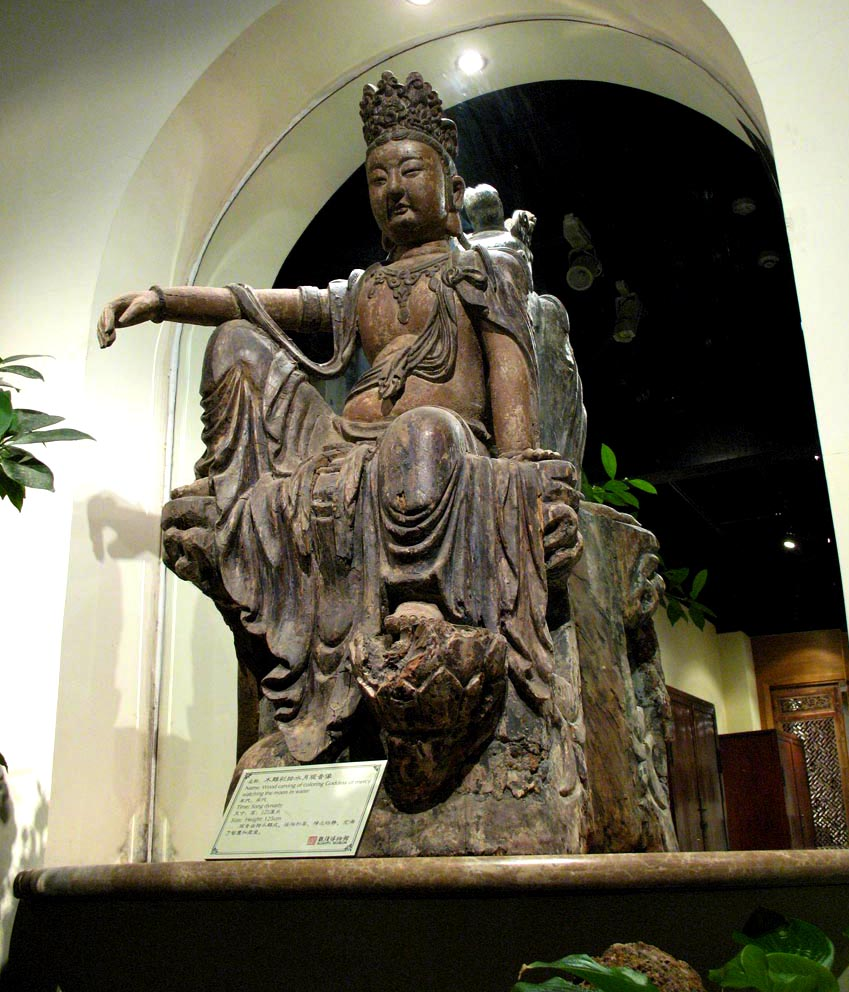
Sculpture of Bodhisattva

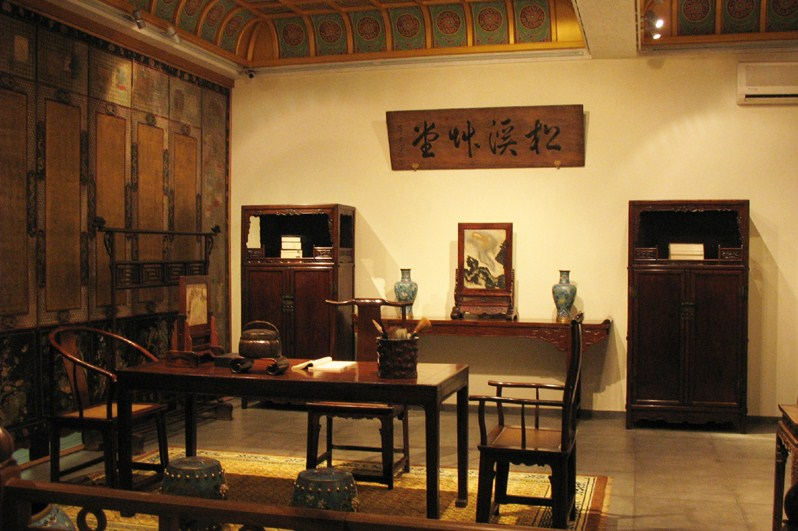
A display of furniture

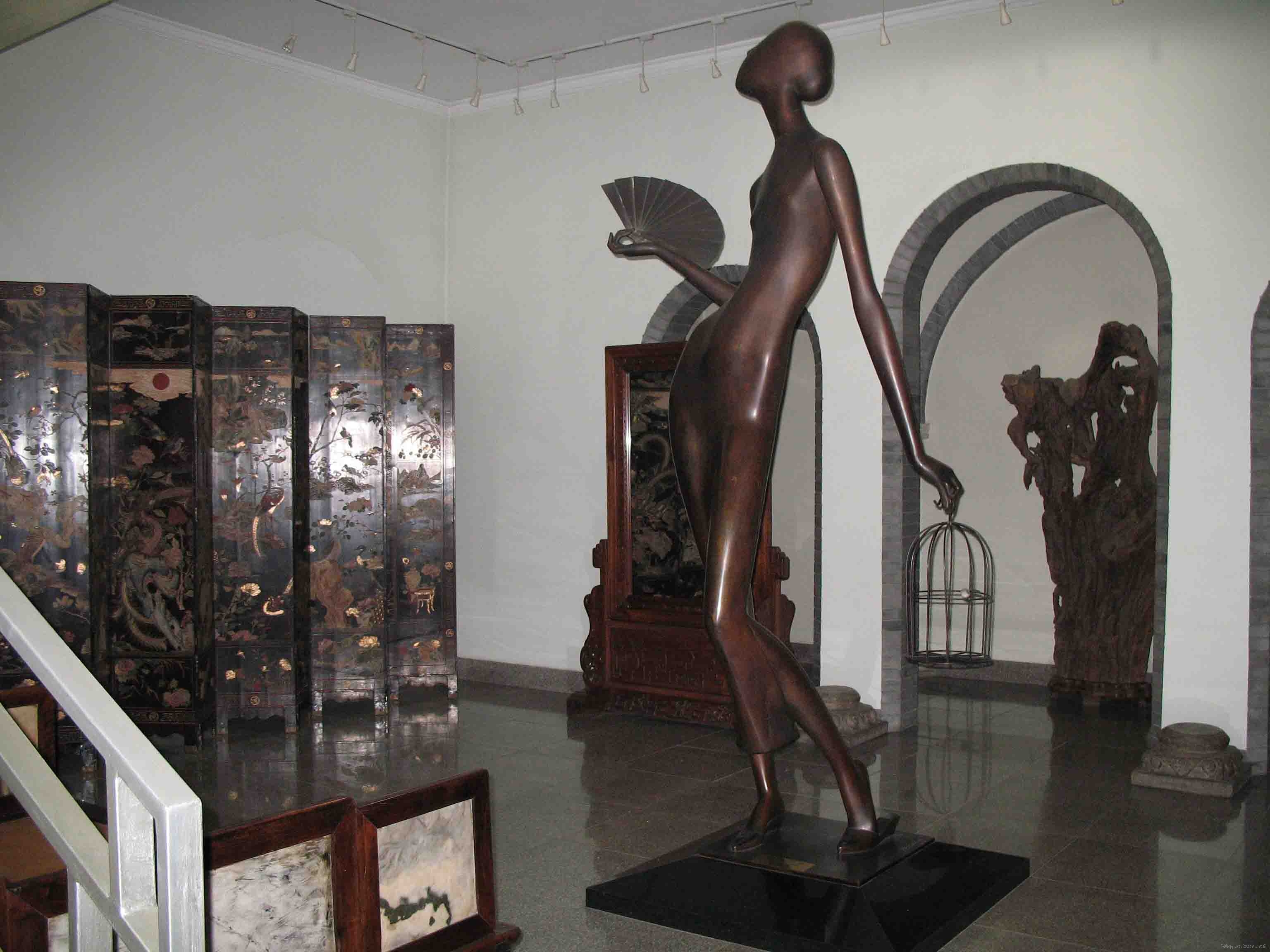
Display of furniture

== See also ==
- List of museums in China
- List of museums in Beijing
