= Longgang Museum of Hakka Culture =

Museum in Shenzhen, China

Coordinates: 22.7277°N 114.2661°E

- Simplified Chinese: 龙岗客家民俗博物馆
- Traditional Chinese: 龍崗客家民俗博物館
Transcriptions
Standard Mandarin
- Hanyu Pinyin: Lónggǎng Kèjiā Mínsú Bówùguǎn
Yue: Cantonese
- Jyutping: lung4 gong1 haak3 gaa1 man4 zuk6 bok3 mat6 gun2

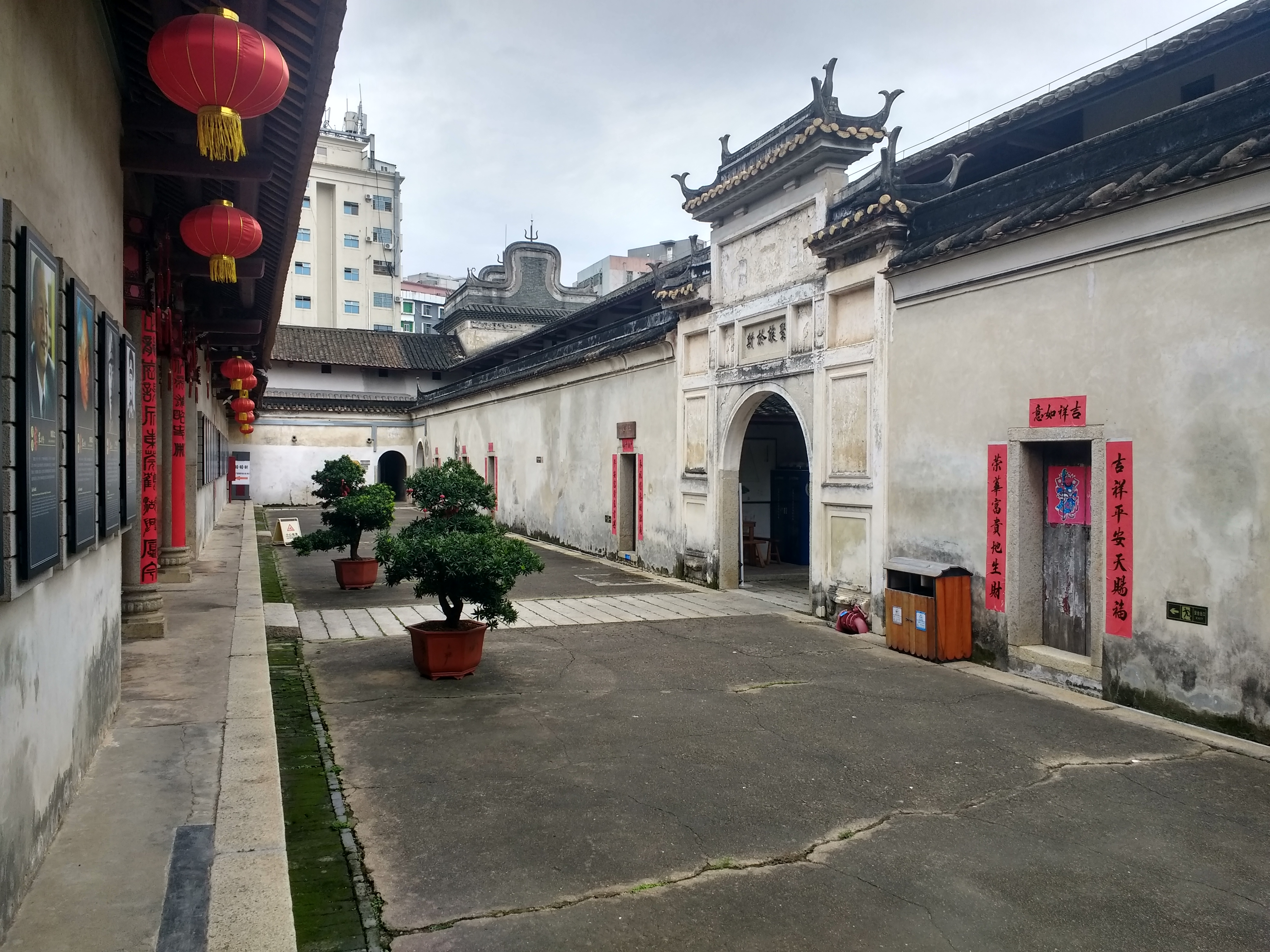
Longgang Museum of Hakka Culture (interior)

The Longgang Museum of Hakka Culture is located in the Longgang District of Shenzhen City, Guangdong Province, China. It contains a group of Hakka-style buildings originally built by Hakka people from Xingning.

== See also ==
- List of museums in China
