= Liangzhu Museum =

Museum in Zhejiang, China

- Chinese: 良渚博物院
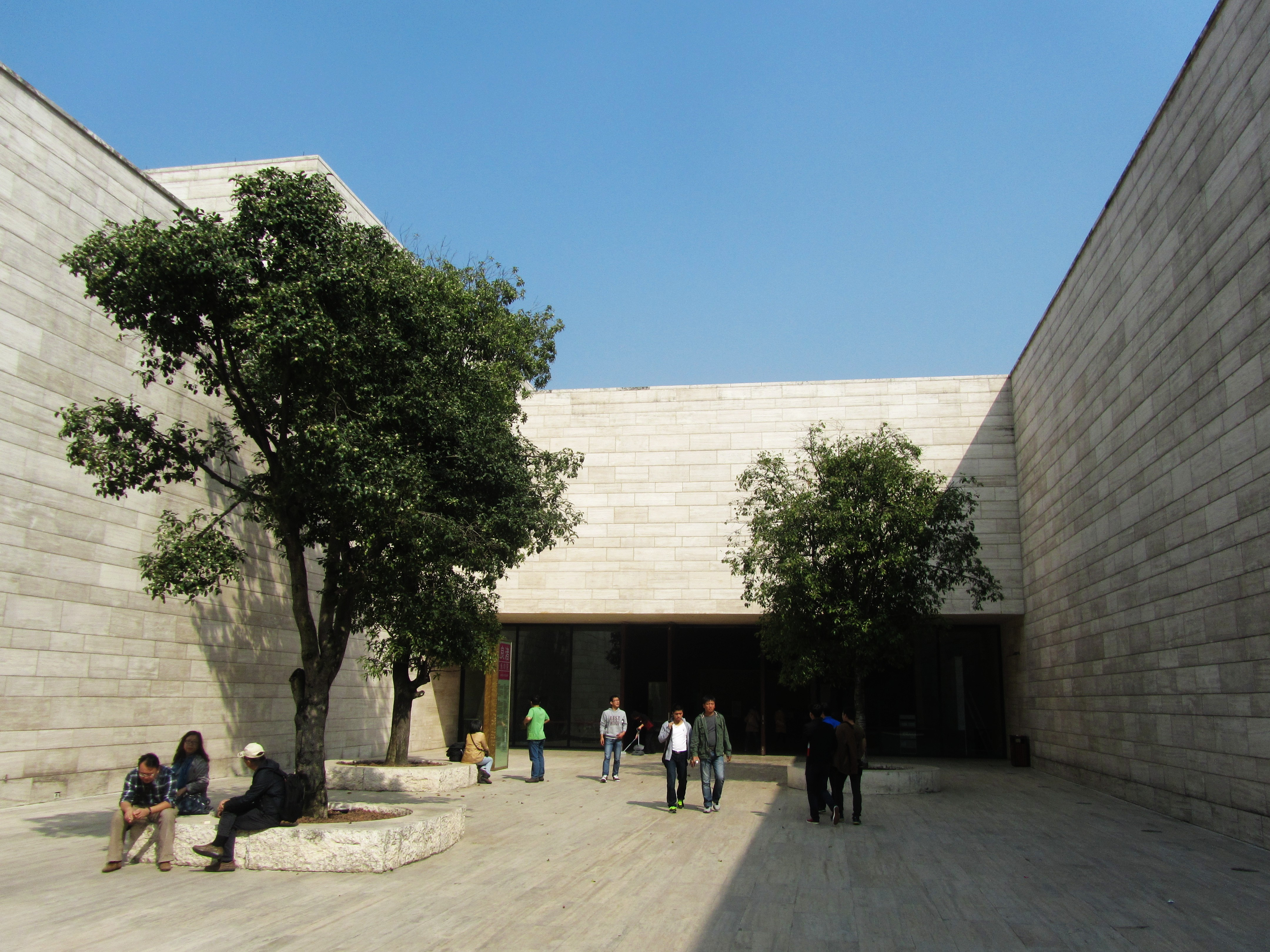
- Courtyard outside the Liangzhu Museum

- Location within Zhejiang Location within China
- Established: 7 January 2020
- Coordinates: 30°22′46″N 120°01′24″E

The Liangzhu Museum (Chinese: 良渚博物院; pinyin: Liángzhǔ Bówùyuàn) is an archaeological museum dedicated to the Neolithic Liangzhu culture. It houses a collection of artefacts from the archaeological culture. It is located in Liangzhu, in the northwestern outskirts of Hangzhou, the capital of Zhejiang Province, China.

== Origin of the name ==
The culture was first discovered in a small township called Liangzhu, in Hangzhou, Zhejiang in 1931, and so similar discoveries found near the site are altogether called Liangzhu culture. The Liangzhu culture is also known as the Jade culture and dates from 3000 BC. The Museum is built on the site where many Liangzhu treasures were unearthed.

== History of the museum ==
The museum was designed by David Chipperfield Architects and completed in 2007. The site was previously a contaminated industrial site, and has been landscaped into a park by Levin Monsigny Landschaftsarchitekten, with hills and manmade streams. The project took five years to design and construct, and was developed in conjunction with ZTUDI, the Architectural Design and Research Institute at Zhejiang University of Technology.

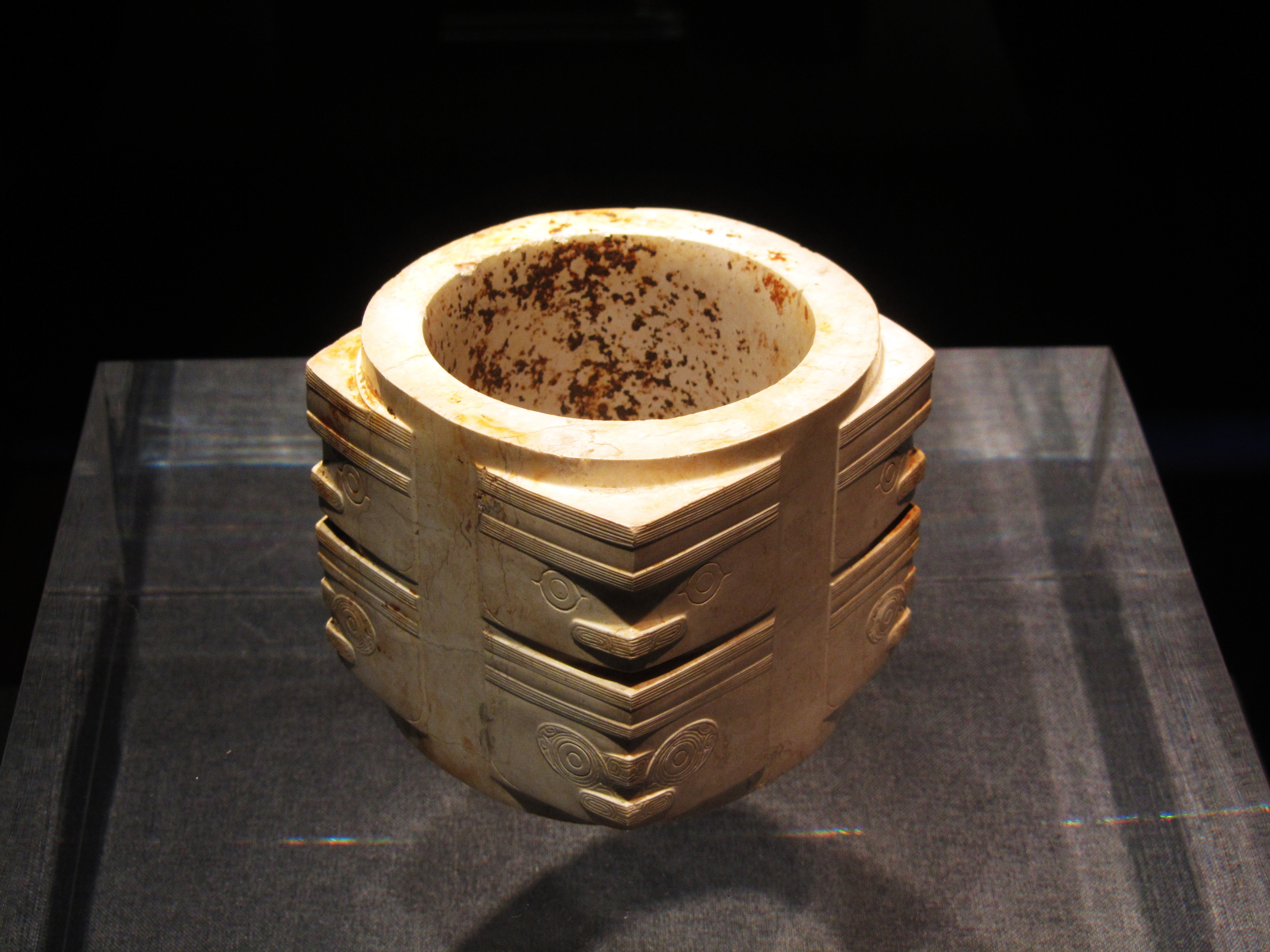
A jade cong excavated from the Yaoshan site

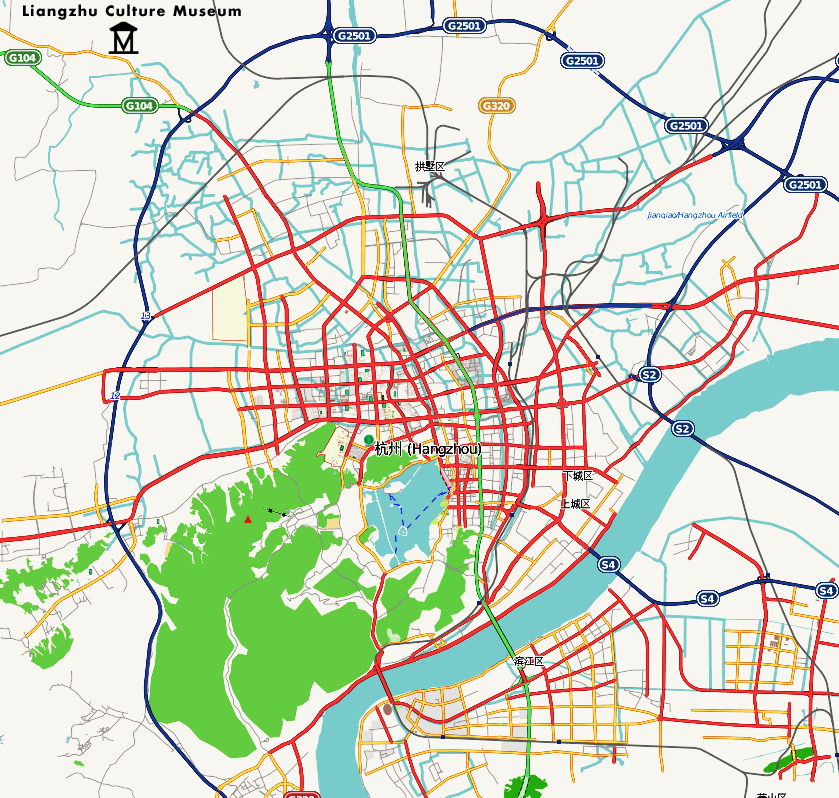
Location of Liangzhu Culture Museum outside Hangzhou

== Museum Layout ==
The Museum is stone-clad with Iranian travertine stone and is surrounded on three sides by a man-made lake. It is built around an abstract geometrical design, comprising four blocks, all 18 m wide but different heights, and lengths. Five internal courtyards punctuate the space, connecting the galleries and allowing the entry of daylight. Visitors enter the building via a bridge across the lake, echoing the aquaculture and irrigation systems of the Liangzhu people.

The site uses more than 40,000 square meters, including 10,000 square meters of gross area, which consist of three conventional and a temporary exhibition and other function rooms. A courtyard at the back gives access across a second bridge to a small island on which outdoor exhibitions can be displayed.

== Liangzhu culture status ==
Liangzhu culture is one of the most important ancient cultures in the catchment area of the Yangtze because of its rice agriculture, elaborate handicraft industry and art achievement.

== See also ==
- List of museums in China
- Liangzhu culture
- Hemudu culture
