= Digital Beijing Building =

Data center built for the 2008 Summer Olympics

- 数字北京大厦
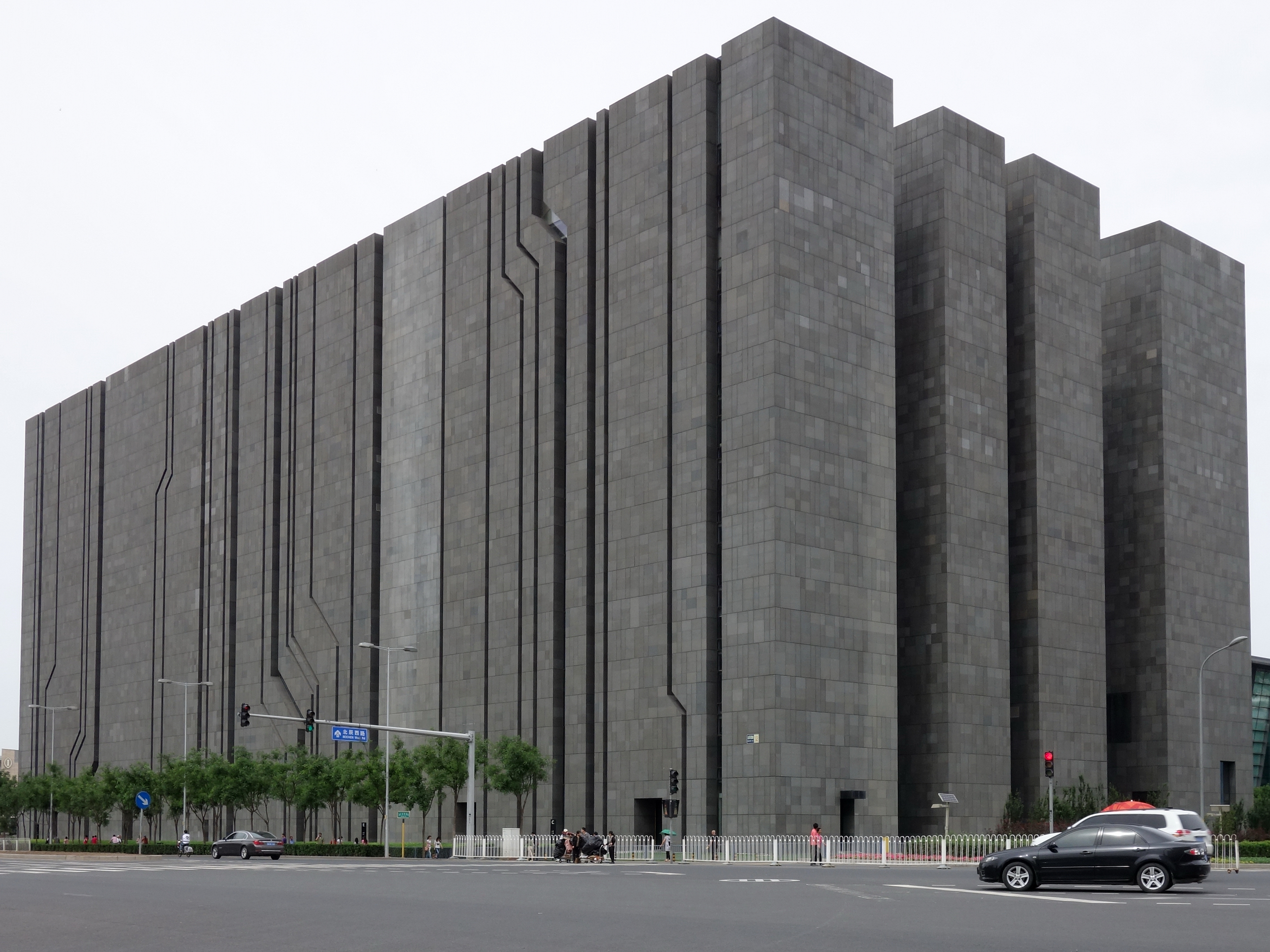
- South and west elevations, 2013
- Interactive map of the Digital Beijing Building area
- Etymology: Original use as data center

General information
- Location: Beichen West and Anxiang North roads, Olympic Green, Chaoyang District, Beijing, China
- Coordinates: 39.99396°N 116.38173°E
- Construction started: 2005
- Completed: 3 November 2007

Height
- Height: 57 metres (187 ft)

Technical details
- Structural system: Reinforced concrete and steel
- Floor count: 11
- Floor area: 98,000 m^{2} (1.05 million sq. ft)
- Grounds: 16,000 m^{2} (170,000 sq ft)

Design and construction
- Architect: Pei Zhu
- Known for: Only major Olympic Green facility designed by a Chinese architect

The Digital Beijing Building (simplified Chinese: 数字北京大厦; traditional Chinese: 數字北京大廈; pinyin: Shùzì běijīng dàshà) is located northwest of the intersection of Beichen West and Anxiang North roads, on Olympic Green, in the Chaoyang District of Beijing, China. It is a 57-metre-tall (187 ft) block-shaped building erected to serve as a data center during the 2008 Summer Olympics. Since then it has served as both a museum devoted to the use of computing in the Olympics, and exhibition space for digital technology companies.

It was the only major facility on Olympic Green not to be an event venue for the games, and the only major Olympic facility designed by a Chinese architect. That architect, Pei Zhu, was interested in the connections between traditional Chinese design and digital technology. He produced a sustainable building that resembles a circuit board when viewed from either side and a bar code when viewed from either end, in the process using some new materials for the first time in China. It has been both praised for its avoidance of kitsch and criticized as resembling Orwell's Ministry of Truth. At the 2008 World Architecture Festival it was shortlisted in its category.

== Building ==
Digital Beijing is located on the northwest corner of the intersection of Beichen West, Anxiang North and Huizhong roads in the Olympic Green neighborhood of Beijing's Chaoyang District, a generally level area 10 kilometres (6.2 mi) north of the Forbidden City on the city's central axis. Guihua Third Street is to the north, and Tianchen West Road is to the west. To the southeast is the Beijing National Aquatics Center, colloquially known as the Watercube, the venue for swimming and diving at the Olympics and now an indoor water park; the distinctive Beijing National Stadium, or Birds' Nest, is to the east of the Aquatics Center. East of the building is the Beijing National Indoor Stadium, where gymnastics and several other events were held. Another important Olympic venue, the China National Convention Center, takes up several blocks to the northeast.

Directly to the south are several blocks of lightly planted open space buffering the Aquatics Center from Beichen West. On the north a parking lot separates Digital Beijing from National Stadium Road and the InterContinental Beichen Beijing Hotel high-rise on the other side. The buildings of Science Park Nanli are across Beichen to the west, and the Pangu Seven-Star Hotel on the southwest corner of the intersection anchors the buildings of Pangu Plaza, which continue to the south along the west side of Beichen West.

Water surrounds the building's 16,000 square metres (170,000 sq ft) on all sides but the east. It consists of four large narrow slabs 11 stories (57 metres (187 ft)) high but of varying thickness, with the easternmost thickest of all, with gaps between them, with the gap between the eastern slab and the others being wider. All are connected by pedestrian bridges at various heights; those nearer each other have larger bridges, with the two on the west having a two-story glass hyphen. They are faced in a dark stone quarried in northern China, with some inserts of aluminum made to look like stone.

Although there is a smooth glass curtain wall (made of a low-energy glass with low thermal conductivity, to save energy with many windows on the east elevation and the interior facades overlooking the gaps, there are no windows on the west face. Instead, it is decorated with irregularly spaced vertical grooves of differing width and that take diagonal turns at different points along their descent and then straighten out again shortly afterwards. At night a series of green LEDs blink in a descending fashion down the 1,323-square-metre (14,240 sq ft) east facade. The flat roof has a rainwater collection system.

Inside the rooms and hallways are floored in a translucent fiber-reinforced plastic (FRP). Images can be, and are, projected on the undersides of interior pedestrian bridges. There is 98,000 m^{2} (1.05 million sq ft) of space, including two underground levels. Lighting is provided by an LED system that uses 60% less energy than other forms.

== History ==
Once Beijing was awarded the 2008 Summer Olympics in 2001, planning began for the Games, and the Olympic Green area in the city's Chaoyang District that would host the Olympic Village and many major event venues. One theme of the Olympics was to be the "Digital Olympics", using more new information technology than had ever before been used in the Olympics. Early in 2002, the city's Municipal Informatization Office called for a "landmark building" to use as the main data center during the Games and for other, related purposes afterwards.

A contest was held, and the design by Pei Zhu, then with the Chinese firm Urbanus but in the process of setting up his own Pei Zhu Studio, was chosen from among eight competitors in 2004. It was the only major facility among the 31 new buildings to have been designed by a Chinese architect. It was also the only Olympic Green building that was not an Olympic event venue.

"If the industrial revolution resulted in modernism, contemporary architecture needs to explore what will form out of the current revolution of information," Zhu wrote later. "Conceptually, Digital Beijing was developed through reconsideration and reflection on the role of Chinese architecture in the modern information era. [It] helps to develop a new aesthetic, an architectural language that is thoroughly contemporary, but retains a Chinese texture and sensibility."

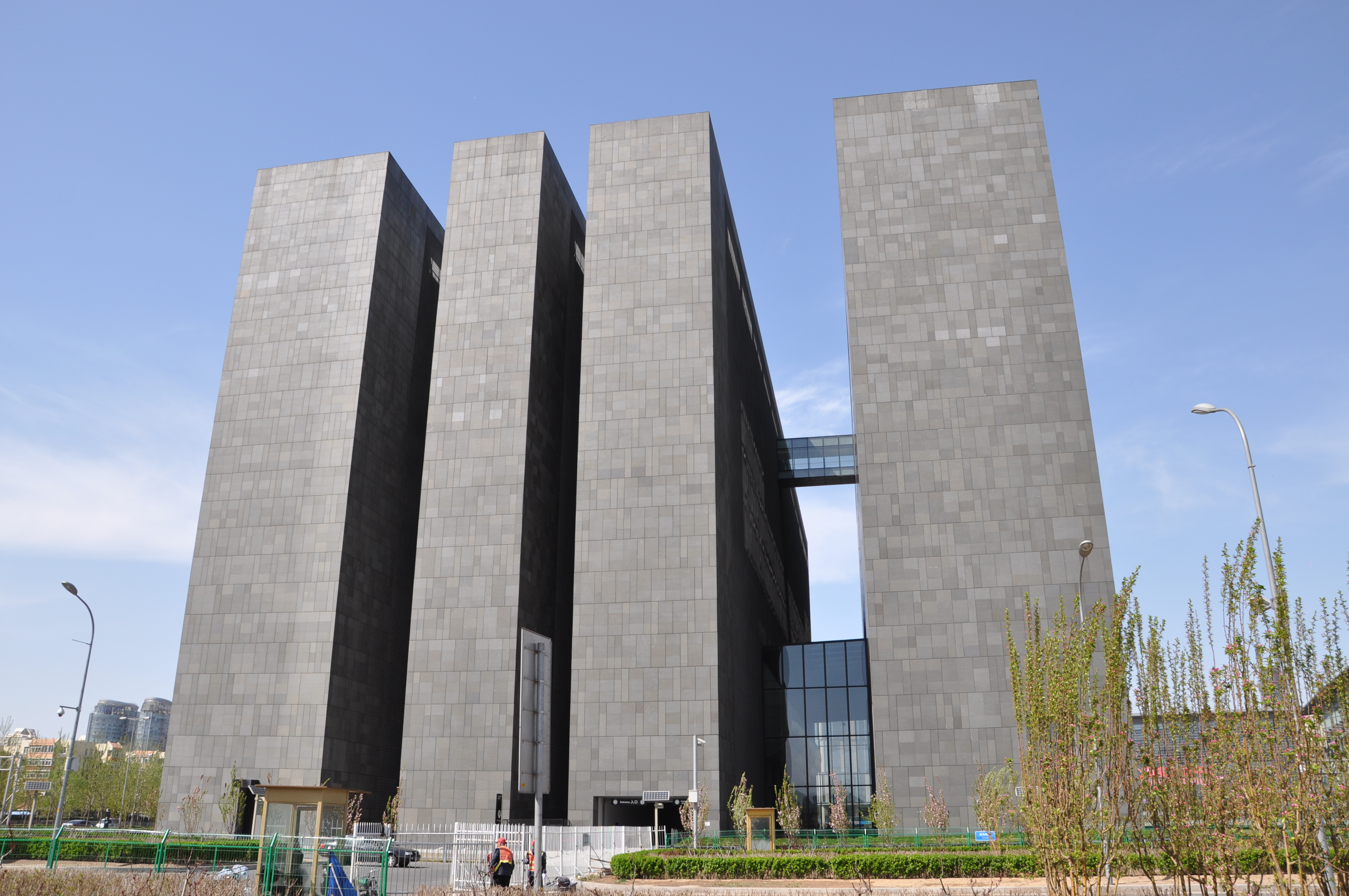
South elevation, 2011, with "alternation between void and solid" visible

To that end, the building he designed echoes the tools it was designed to house. From the ends it resembles a bar code, rising from the water. Zhu explains:

The abstracted mass of the building, reflecting the simple repetition of 0 and 1 in its alternation between void and solid, recreates on a monumental scale the microscopic underpinnings of life in the digital age to form a potent symbol of the Digital Olympics and the Digital Era ... The three bars that reflect the solid typology are physical manifestations of information technology. Inside are all of the computers and machines that make up the mainframe.

The east and west facades offer a contrast between the windowless western side, continuing to emphasize the building's contents and purpose by being decorated to resemble a circuit board, and the open, glassy easy. This contrast of extremes, according to Zhu, is what the building draws from Chinese culture, specifically the hutong, the narrow mazes of alleyways where much of Beijing's traditional street life and community took place. "On the exterior transparency is very rare, where internally the true interaction between nature, open space and building is most evident." He concludes "Through the perspective of Chinese philosophy, everything including the advancement of technology has an intimate connection with the natural realm. Aesthetically this perspective continues a dialogue between the past and the future."

Construction began in 2005. During that time Zhu and the builders were to take advantage of two newly developed materials. The first, a translucent fiber reinforced plastic, had first been developed for a hotel Zhu was building elsewhere in Beijing as a substitute for jade, which proved too expensive to use in the quantity he had wanted it. Since it held images projected in it well, he also decided to use it for the flooring inside Digital Beijing, where it could become a "digital carpet", similar to the "urban carpet" Zaha Hadid created for the Rosenthal Center for Contemporary Art in Cincinnati, Ohio. It was also strong enough to support the interior footbridges, so Zhu used it there too. On the exterior, a local maker of beverage cans developed the aluminum sheets for the building's facades that gleam in places yet still look like stone from far away.

The building was completed and opened on 3 November 2007. It served as the main data center during the Summer Games the following year, as intended (a backup was built in an undisclosed location). Since then it has served, also as planned, as a museum of the Digital Olympics and exhibition space, both concentrated in the public area of the building on the east, where the interior is visible. "Digital Beijing accepts this transformation with a capacity for constant renovation, sprinting alongside the pace of our time," Zhu wrote.

== Reception ==
The first public reaction from an architecture critic was positive. "If China has set out to impress the world with the 2008 Olympics," The Guardian's Jonathan Glancey wrote in February 2008, several months before the Games and two months after the building's completion, "the stadium and its attendant buildings—the Aquatics Centre and Digital Beijing (the Olympics 'command post')—have set a heady precedent." He contrasted them with the tepid reaction to building designs already unveiled for the 2012 Summer Olympics in London.

Glancey likened the four upright slabs to "upright 1960s IBM computers" and praised Zhu's "creative use of unexpected materials". Unlike most other prominent contemporary Chinese architects, Zhu had, the critic noted, enjoyed the luxury of time in his work. "The result is delightful."

However, a few months later, Tom Dyckhoff of The Times was not so impressed. He was the first Western journalist allowed to tour Olympic Green, most of which was still under construction and surrounded with a 4-metre-high (13 ft) steel fence under military guard to block it from public view. While he had unmitigated praise for the Birds' Nest, he considered the rest of the buildings "a flop". He described Digital Beijing as "chees[y] ... Four gloomy stone slabs, divided by glass atria, do an excellent Orwellian Ministry of Truth impression." He did allow that it was "slightly less spirit-crushing inside".

Dyckhoff's was the only prominent negative reaction. Two months after the Olympics, at that year's World Architecture Festival, Digital Beijing was shortlisted in its category. The next year, former New York Times critic Paul Goldberger wrote in his book Building Up and Tearing Down: Reflection on the Age of Architecture that while, like the adjacent Water Cube, Digital Beijing "steers dangerously close to a kitschy conceit", it, too, succeeds. "The finished building has a dignity that is surprising ... an austerity that is the opposite of kitsch."

In 2011 Harvard professor Peter G. Rowe wrote at length about Digital Beijing in Emergent Architectural Territories in East Asian Cities. "Although hardly the fault of architecture under such a presumption", he wrote of Zhu's stated aesthetic intentions for the building, "this sort of symbol may seem somewhat at odds with the dispersed and uniquitous character of today's digital media." Nevertheless, he continued, that may have been part of the building's point.

[B]y calling such direct attention to this era in what will doubtless be a continuing information age, Studio Pei Zhu have perhaps marked the awkwardness, or uncertainty, many have about rapidly evolving technology today, and in a manner that might otherwise have gone unrecognized. Despite its literalness, the complex can also be seen as socially critical in this regard.

== See also ==
- List of museums in China
