= Silk Route Museum =

Museum in Jiuquan, China

Coordinates: 39.7707°N 98.4327°E

The Silk Route Museum (Chinese: 丝绸之路博物馆) is located in Jiuquan, Gansu Province along the Silk Road, a trading route connecting Rome to China, used by Marco Polo. It is also built over the tomb of the Xiliang King in Gansu Province. Founded by Mei Ping Wu and staffed by volunteers, the museum is dedicated to the fostering of an enhanced understanding between East and West.

The museum opened in October 2009 and is dedicated to the history of the ancient Silk Road. The museum holds in trust a collection of rare and historical artifacts dating to the time of the original Silk Road. The museum houses an exhibition area of over 100,000 square feet which includes over 35,000 pieces from the Jade Road collection, a substantial subterranean art gallery, the Wei Jin Tombs, as well as historical sites from the Hexi Corridor of ancient China.

== Exhibits ==
Exhibitions include displays of art, tools, and fossils covering the Jiuquan period, and the earliest evidence of central Asian civilization. In the Xiliang Hall, master pieces of jade work of Neolithic origin. A jade market open to local and outside traders, as well as, auctions and the Moon Light Cup of Jiuquan.

The show pieces possess the characteristics from the pre-historical culture to Ming and Qing dynasties and represent the history, politics, economy, science and technology, cultural arts, husbandry production, religious belief and daily customs from thousands of years ago.

== See also ==
- List of museums in China
