= Ben Howe (artist) =

Australian artist (born 1977)

Benjamin Howe (born 1977 in London, England) is a contemporary Australian artist known primarily for his figurative and experimental oil painting.

== Education and career ==
He holds a Masters of fine art degree with distinction from RMIT University.

Howes work is distinguished by his scientificly-surrealist imagery that is both hyper-realistic yet reductive. His works have been referred to as ‘isolated or lonely’ and regularly feature a muted or monochromatic palette. Howe's paintings are often derived from preliminary explorations in other media such as sculpture, photography, and film. His works frequently examine ideas relating to inconsistencies of memory, personal history and the nature of consciousness. Howe's artwork has been exhibited worldwide. He has had 23 solo exhibitions, including 2 retrospectives, and his work has been included in more than 70 group shows.

Howe was the winner of the 2024 Richard Lester Prize for Portraiture for his enigmatic painting ‘Cartagena Library.’

In 2023 he won the Eureka prize. His work ‘Permanent Rose’ was a finalist in 17^{th} International ARC Salon, and he received a distinction in the Portrait Society of America's 28th annual competition with ‘Matilda in Blue.’ In 2021 he received an Honourable mention in the Beautiful Bizarre art award. In 2019, Howe was a finalist in the Doug Moran National Portrait Prize, and the Lester Prize. He has also been a finalist in the Black Swan Prize (2016), and the Metro 5 Award, (2012 and 2011). In 2017, he won the Hill Smith Prize at NotFair. He has been the recipient of residencies and fellowships including the Ucross Foundation, USA (2015), Shangyuan Art Museum, China (2014), and SKAM, Germany (2007).

Howe's paintings have been featured as cover art on several music releases, book covers and reproduced in magazines and journals including Hi Fructose, Beautiful Bizarre, Selected Contemporary Artists of Australia, Hyperrealism Magazine, Double Dialogues and Out of Step Books. In 2019, his paintings were used in a new publication of Moby Dick, celebrating Herman Melville’s 200th anniversary.

Howe was a finalist in the 2024 Archibald Prize for his portrait of Kylie Moore-Gilbert and Sami Shah.

== Works ==
=== "Crowds", 2009 – present ===
Howe created a series of miniature sculptures to simulate the idea and feeling of an assembly, without any attachment to an actual event. The dioramas were photographed and rendered in paint, using a technique that appears photographic from a distance, yet becomes more abstracted and painterly with proximity. Repetition, miniaturisation, and fluctuations between representation and abstraction were used to activate links between the body, movement and memory.

=== "Within the Grey", 2014–2015 ===
This series reflects a more interior examination of the human psyche, and a counterbalance to Howe's work with crowds. It depicts the peculiar association of subject to physical space. The paintings document and explore the semi-conscious adaptation to new environments experienced by temporary residents; examining how people move into a space and start to inhabit it. Embracing a synthesis of both external and internal realities, the works interweave themes of dislocation, habitation and the subliminal response of the psyche towards the unknown. Howe's use of expressive brushwork, sharp contrasts and spatial distortions illuminate or add information while symbolic elements, informed by the subjects activity, or the artists own reaction to the space, further disrupt the illusion of sheer figurative representation.

=== "Surface Variations", 2002 – present ===
Through a process of creating sculptures that reference aspects of the body and then subjecting the clay forms to dislocation and realignment, Howe reconfigure the Marquette to form new compositions and meanings. Cut, broken, compacted and rearranged, they are often unrecognizable in the finished paintings, which are contemplation on the fractured and subjective nature of memory, and the effect it has on the construction of identity. He is known to destroy the sculptures and reuse the same block of clay for every piece.

=== "City", 2010–2013 ===
These paintings address movement within the metropolitan environment, informed by research relating to the examination of aggregate behavior over various duration and viewpoints. Howe attempts to compress this information into single images by building overlapping layers of paint based on video footage and sequential photographs. The paintings are an attempt to show how collective elements reveal potential form over time; the individual and the city part of an integrated whole. Using the constraints and unique material attributes of paint including layering, color, texture and fluctuating levels of focus, Howe explores conflicting ideas of symbiosis, dislocation and placelessnes within contemporary life and the metropolitan crowd.

== Solo exhibitions ==
2024 Echoes in the Abyss, Compendium Gallery, Melbourne, Australia

- 2022 Ashen Rainbow, Compendium Gallery, with Scott Livesey Galleries, Melbourne, Australia
- 2022 The More Things Change, Beinart Gallery, Melbourne, Australia
- 2019 Leviathan, Beinart Gallery, Melbourne, Australia
- 2018 A Strange Architecture, Hill Smith Gallery, Adelaide, Australia
- 2017 Weave, Beinart Gallery, Melbourne, Australia
- 2017 Selection, Mycelium, Melbourne
- 2016 Themes of Dislocation and Habitation, St Francis, Melbourne
- 2015 Monochromatic Anomalies, Lorimer Gallery, Melbourne, Australia
- 2014 Within the Grey, Shangyuan Museum of Modern Art, Beijing, China
- 2013 The Sum of its Parts, Metro Gallery, Melbourne
- 2012 Signs, Manyung Gallery, Melbourne
- 2011 Exploring Transience: locating meaning within the urban crowd. First Site Gallery, Melbourne
- 2010 Schism Overwrite, As Soon As Gallery, Hamburg
- 2009 Graffscapes, Manyung Gallery, Melbourne
- 2008 Urban Fractures 2, 5-502, Sydney
- 2007 Once Upon a Space, Brunswick Street Gallery, Melbourne
- 2007 Raumatisiert, Wir sind Woanders, European art festival, Hamburg
- 2007 Urban Fractures, SKAMraum, Hamburg
- 2006 Surface Variations, Brunswick Street Gallery, Melbourne
- 2004 Forms and shadows, Manyung Gallery, Melbourne
- 2003 Selected works, Manyung Gallery, Melbourne

== Group exhibitions ==
- 2025 Exploration 25, Flinders Lane Gallery, Melbourne
- 2025 Dark Art 2025, Beinart Gallery, Melbourne
- 2025 Adrenaline Junkie, Norman Rea Gallery, University of York, England
- 2024 Lester Prize, Western Australian Museum, WA
- 2024 Archibald Prize, Art Gallery of New South Wales
- 2024 Together, Always and Never, White Night, Ballarat, Victoria
- 2024 Antipodes 2024, Beinart Gallery, Melbourne
- 2023 Dark Art 2023, Beinart Gallery, Melbourne
- 2023 Antipodes 2023, Beinart Gallery, Melbourne
- 2022 Interconnected, New England Regional Art Museum (NERAM), NSW, Australia
- 2022 Throwback, 6 years of Beinart Gallery
- 2021 Dark Art, Beinart Gallery, Melbourne
- 2021 Lucid, Beinart Gallery, Melbourne
- 2021 Lucid Dreaming, Copro Gallery, Santa Monica, USA
- 2021 Antipodes, Beinart Gallery, Melbourne
- 2020 Dark Art, Beinart Gallery, Melbourne
- 2020 Antipodes, Beinart Gallery, Melbourne
- 2019 Doug Moran National Portrait Prize, Sydney
- 2019 Lester Prize, Art Gallery of WA, Perth Cultural Centre, WA.
- 2019 Dark Art, Beinart Gallery, Melbourne
- 2018 Australian Art, Beinart Gallery, Melbourne
- 2018 Ephemeral, Modern Eden Gallery, San Francisco, USA
- 2018 Focal Point: New Realist Painting. Hill Smith Gallery, Adelaide
- 2018 Dark Art Show, Beinart Gallery, Melbourne
- 2018 Bluethumb Award, Melbourne
- 2017 NotFair 2017, Melbourne
- 2017 The 13th Hour, Last Rites Gallery, New York, USA
- 2017 If Our days won't Last, Distinction Gallery, Escondido, CA, USA
- 2017 Art collecter starter kit, Corey Helford Gallery, Los Angeles, USAv
- 2016 Metro Summer Show 2016, Melbourne
- 2016 Beinart Small Works 2016, Melbourne
- 2016 Metropolis, Manyung Gallery, Melbourne
- 2016 Transmogrify, Beinart Gallery, Melbourne
- 2016 Black Swan prize, Art Gallery of WA, WA.
- 2016 Beinart Inaugural Exhibition, Beinart Gallery, Melbourne
- 2015 Whyalla art prize exhibition, Adelaide Festival Centre, Adelaide
- 2014 Shangyuan Resident Artists 2014
- 2014 Ben Howe and HaHa – Second Story Studio, Melbournev
- 2014 Strange Attractor, D11 Docklands
- 2013 Supporters Exhibition, D11 Docklands
- 2013 Urban, Manyung Gallery, Melbourne
- 2013 Your Old Self, Tinning Street Gallery, Melbourne
- 2012 Exploration 12. Flinders Land Gallery, Melbourne
- 2012 Melbourne Art fair, Exhibition Building, Melbourne
- 2012 Matter and Space. Ne Na Contemporary Art Space, Chiang Mai, Thailand
- 2012 Possibilities, Metro Gallery, Melbourne
- 2012 Dark Horse. The Dark Horse Experiment, Melbourne
- 2012 It's Not You, It's Me, Eckersley's Open Space Gallery, Melbourne
- 2012 Climate Change. Metro Gallery, Melbourne
- 2011 RMIT Master of Fine Art Graduate Exhibition. Gossard Project Space, Melbourne
- 2011 The Brunswick Show, Donkey Wheel House, Melbourne
- 2011 Space and the city, Eckersley's Open Space Gallery. Melbourne
- 2011 Surface: Texture, Materiality and Conceptual Plasticity, RMIT School of Art Gallery, Melbourne.
- 2010 SoBright, Prague, Melbourne
- 2010 New, Used and Abused, Loft Gallery, Melbourne
- 2010 The Brunswick Show, Donkey Wheel House, Melbourne
- 2010 Irene's Street art festival, Irene, Melbourne
- 2010 Out of Nowhere, 696 INK, Melbourne
- 2010 Grand Opening Show, 696 INK, Melbourne
- 2010 Urban Art 10A, Brunswick St Gallery, Melbourne
- 2009 Gaengeviertel, Hamburg
- 2009 Melbourne stencil festival, Collingwood, Melbourne
- 2009 Art Melbourne, Exhibition Building, Melbourne
- 2009 Painting 09A, Brunswick Street Gallery, Melbourne
- 2007 Stencil and Freeform Combinations, A.S.A, Hamburg
- 2007 Art Melbourne, Exhibition Building, Melbourne BSG stand
- 2003 Selected Contemporary Artists of Australia, Manyung Gallery, Melbourne
- 1997 Contingency, RMIT Graduate Show, Span Galleries, Melbourne
