= Stilwell Museum =

Military museum in Chongqing, China

Coordinates: 29°33′02″N 106°31′59″E

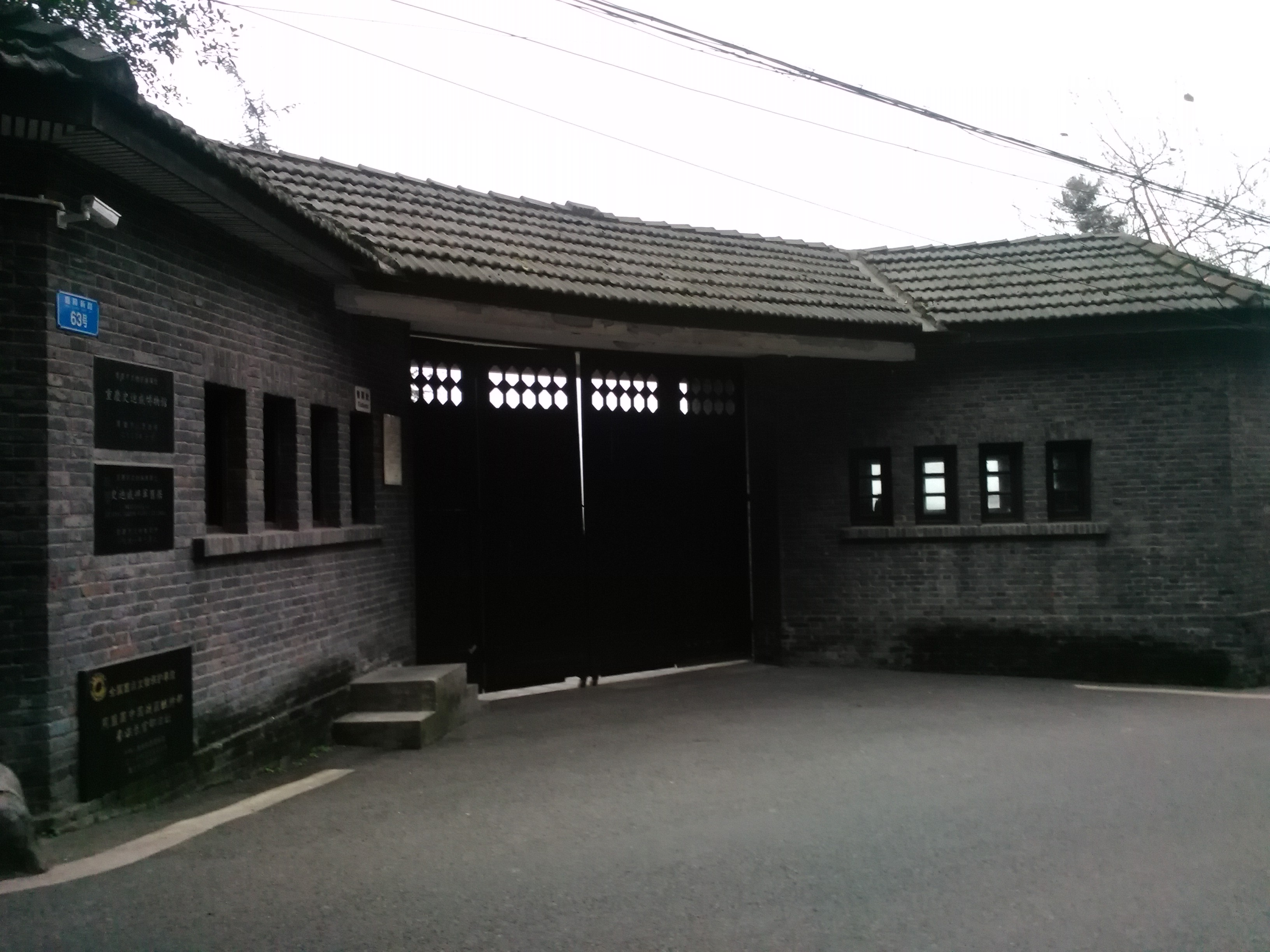
Museum building

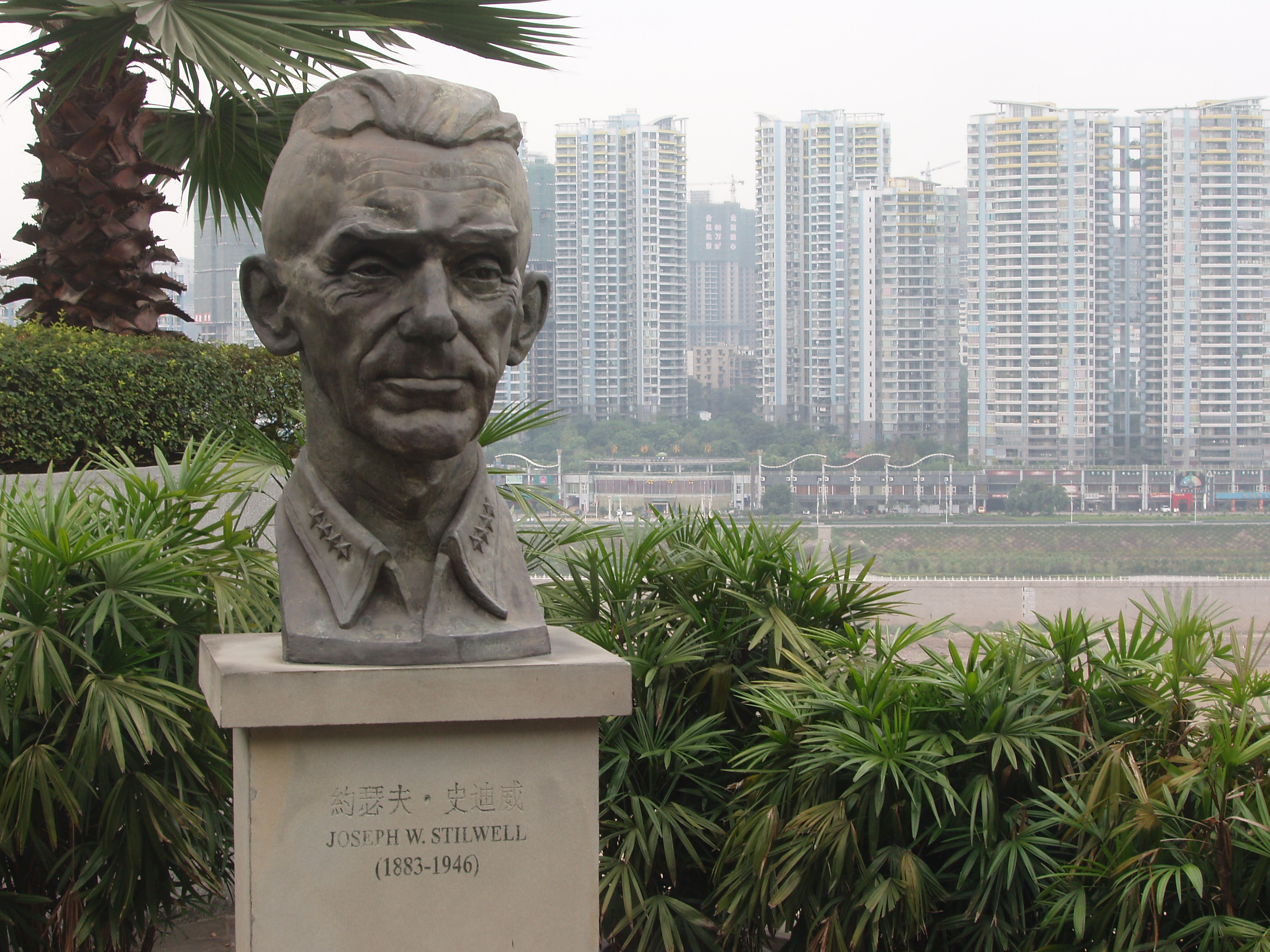
Bust of General Stilwell at the Stilwell Museum in Chongqing.

The Stilwell Museum (Chinese: 史迪威博物馆) is a museum in Yuzhong District of Chongqing that preserves the former residence of General Joseph W. Stilwell, the Allied Chief of Staff in the China Theater during World War II. It opened in 1994. It was refurbished and then reopened in August 2023 after the 140th anniversary of Stilwell's birth.

== Background ==
During World War II General Joseph Stilwell, known to his men as "Vinegar Joe", was the Allied Chief of Staff in the China Theater of Operations. He arrived in Chongqing on March 4, 1942. Stilwell was in charge of the United States' Lend-Lease policy with Chinese forces and had an acrimonious relationship with Kuomintang leader Chiang Kai-shek, who he derisively called "Peanut." His low regard for Chiang, and positive words towards the Communist forces, contributed to his high standing in the People's Republic of China.

== Description ==
Located in Stilwell's former residence and headquarters, the museum comprises a three-storied house furnished in 1940s style. In the courtyard there is an engraving of a speech by American President Franklin D. Roosevelt.

The building opened as a museum in 1994 and is run by the Chongqing Municipal Government. Financial support for the Museum is provided by the Joseph W. Stilwell Institute Foundation Ltd. a US tax-exempt foundation. The Museum was renovated and reopened in March 2003. The renovation was funded by the Freeman Foundation in Vermont, USA. Additional financial support is provided by Stilwell Innovation Enterprises and the Stilwell International Innovation Center.

== See also ==
- List of museums in China
