= Yinchuan Museum of Contemporary Art =

Contemporary art museum in Yinchuan, China

- 银川当代美术馆
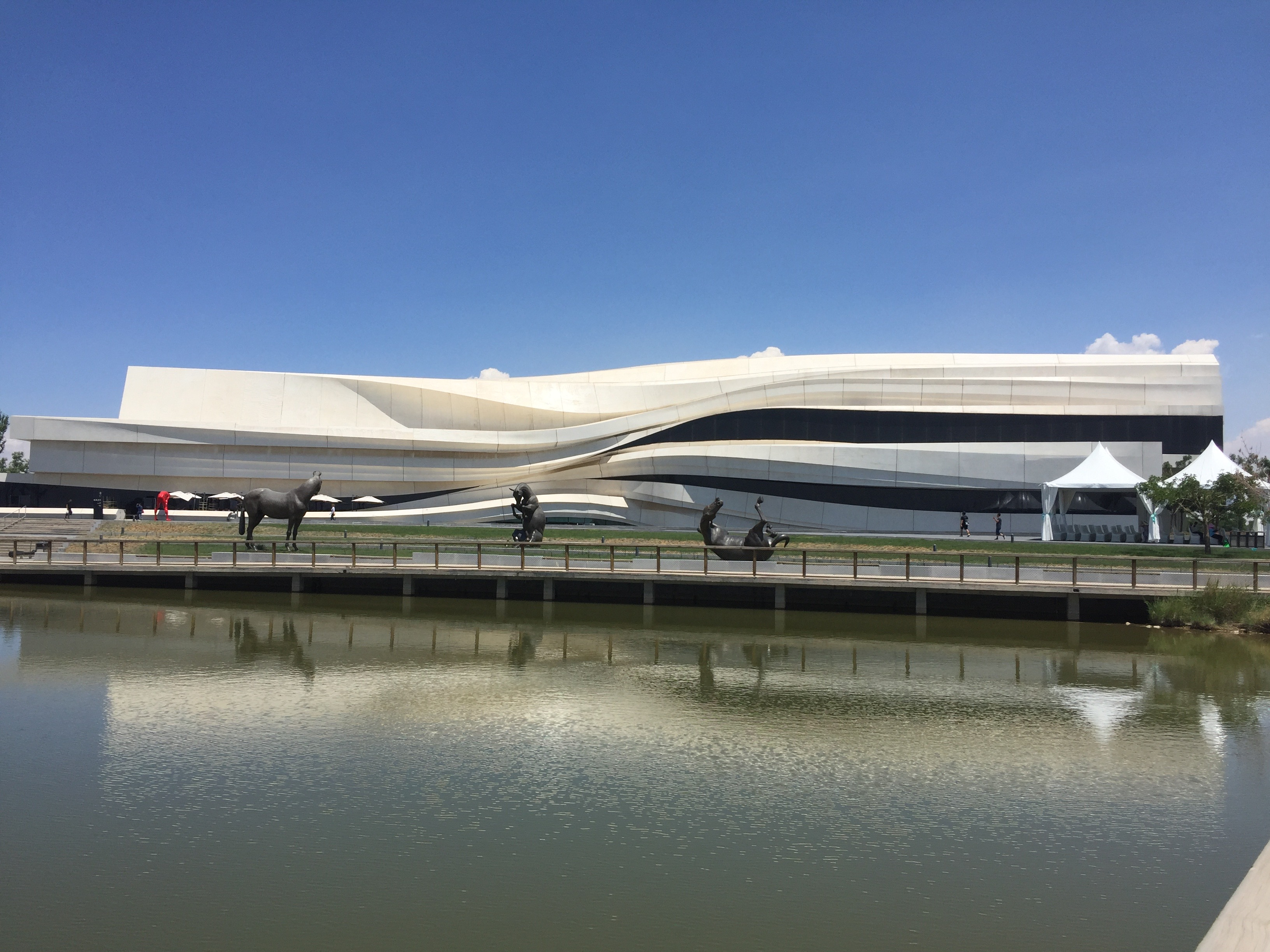
- View of the Yinchuan Museum of Contemporary Art
- Established: 2015
- Location: 12 HeLe Road, Xingqing District, Yinchuan, Ningxia, China, 750101
- Coordinates: 38.365856°N 106.363587°E
- Type: Contemporary art museum
- Public transit access: Buses 21, 10, 601
- Website: www.moca-yinchuan.com (in Chinese)

The Yinchuan Contemporary Art Museum (Chinese: 银川当代美术馆, aka MOCA Yinchuan) is a contemporary art museum in Yinchuan, Ningxia, China.

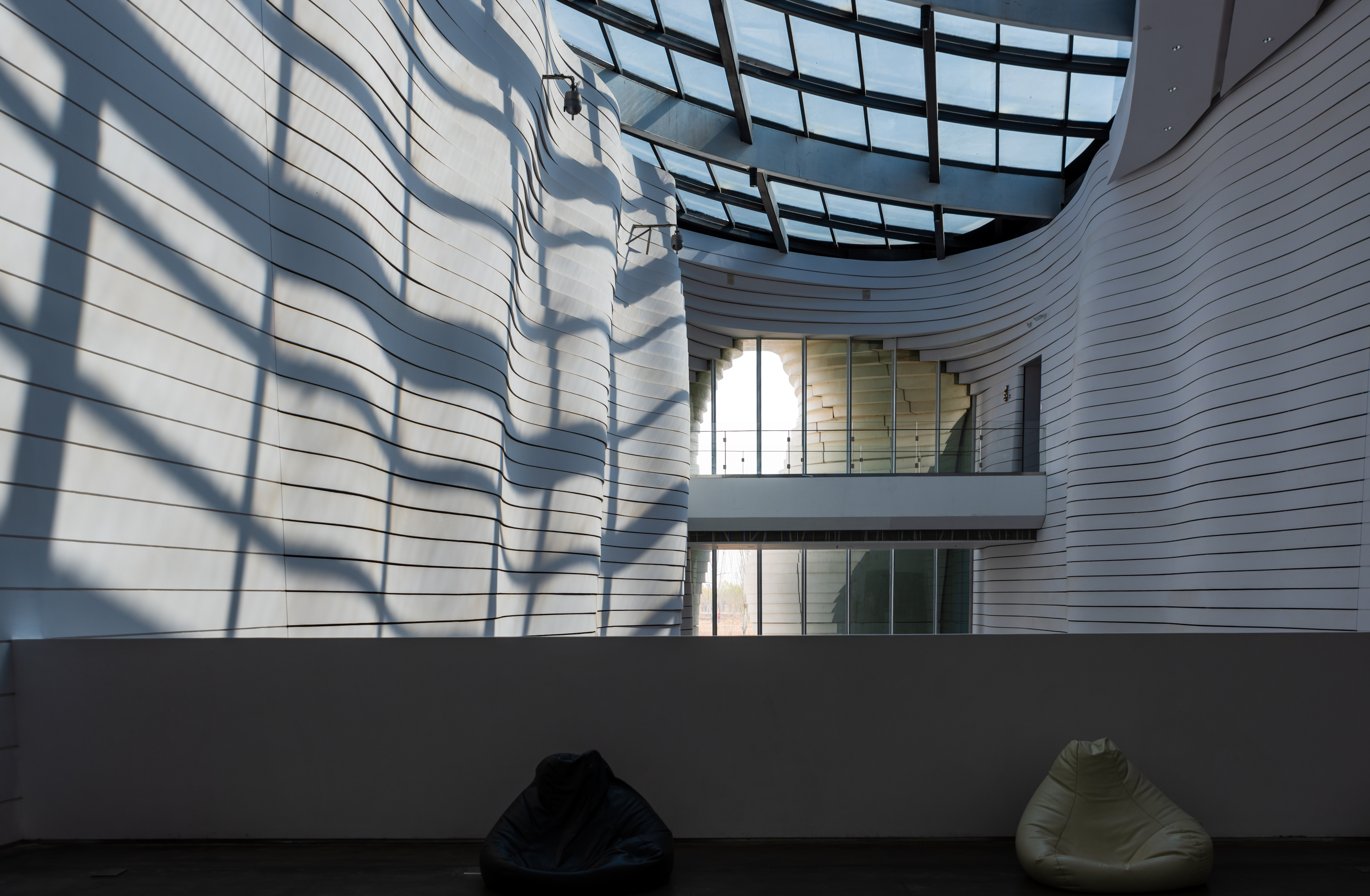
Internal view of the museum

The museum was built during 2011–2015, designed by the architectural firm WAA. Opened to the public in 2015, the museum exhibits contemporary art from China and internationally.

The museum covers an area of 13,188 m^{2}. The museum is located at the edge between paddy field wetlands and desert, divided by the Yellow River, close to Yinchuan Airport. It is the site of the Yinchuan Biennale.

== See also ==
- List of museums in China
