= Shangyuan Art Museum =

Modern art museum in Beijing, China

Shangyuan Art Museum is a modern art museum in Beijing, China. A private museum, it was established in 2007. It hosts an International Residency Programme, with participants coming from all around the world.

== See also ==
- List of museums in China
