= China Agricultural Museum =

Museum in Beijing, China

Coordinates: 39.9399°N 116.4588°E

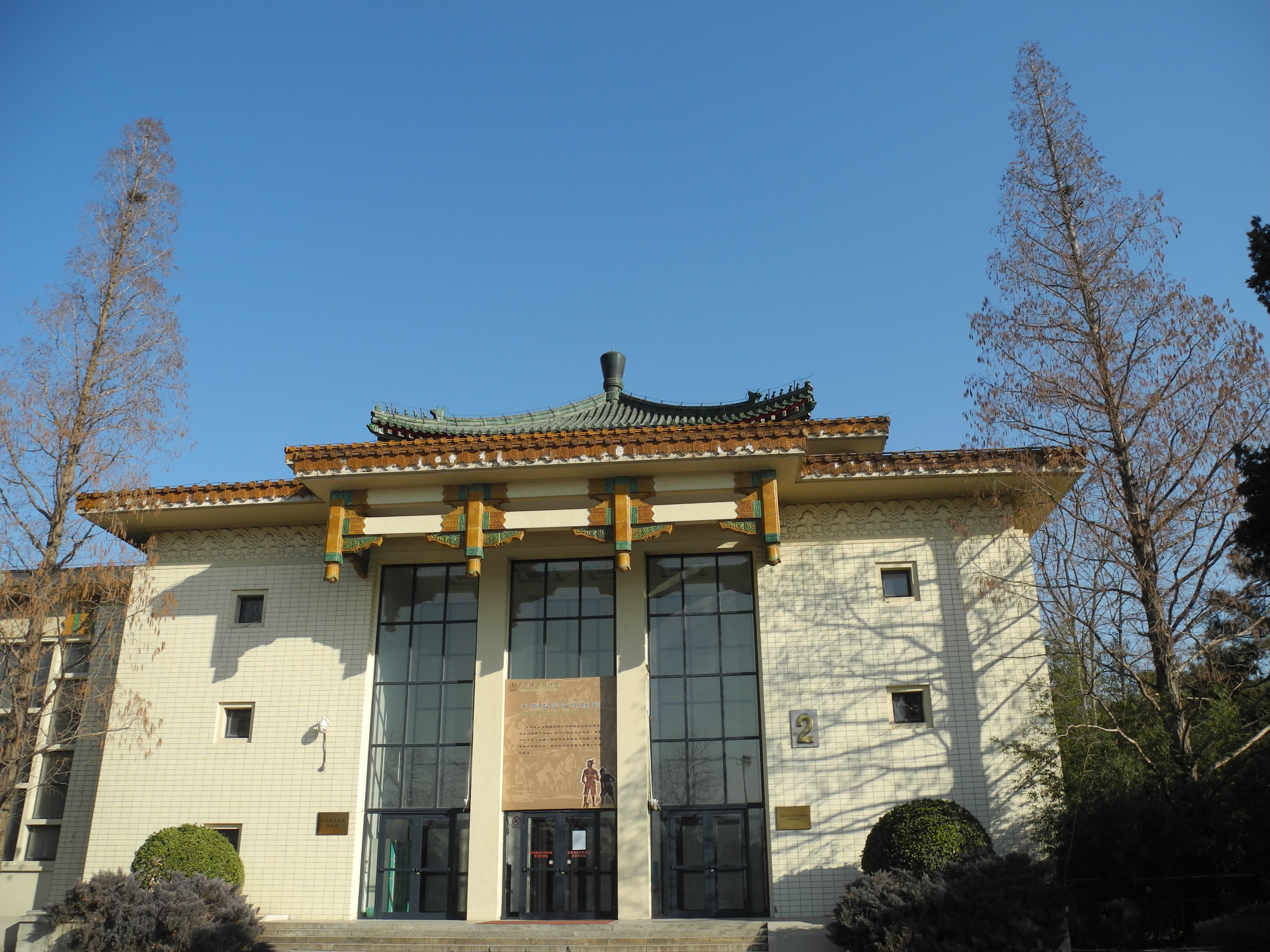
China Agricultural Museum

The China Agricultural Museum, located at No.16, East Third Ring North Road, Chaoyang District, Beijing, in the National Agricultural Exhibition Hall, is the only national agricultural museum in the People's Republic of China. It falls under the jurisdiction of the Ministry of Agriculture of the People's Republic of China, and together with the National Agricultural Exhibition Hall, they form a single institution with two names.

== History ==
In July 1983, the State Council approved the National Agricultural Exhibition Hall to establish the China Agricultural Museum. On September 13, 1986, the China Agricultural Museum officially opened. In September 1987, the museum's periodical "Agriculture Past and Present" was launched. In April 1992, the China Agricultural Museum was awarded the title of "Patriotic Education Base of Two Histories and One Love" by the Beijing Municipal People's Government. In January 2010, the China Agricultural Museum was granted the title of "National Science Popularization Education Base". In 2012, the China Agricultural Museum was designated as a national first-class museum by the State Administration of Cultural Heritage.
