= Polish Home Army Museum, Orchard Lake, Michigan =

Coordinates: 42°35′41″N 83°21′29″W

The Polish Home Army Museum in Orchard Lake, Michigan is dedicated to the memory of the brave men and women of the Armia Krajowa during World War II. The museum tells the story of the struggle for the freedom and independence of Poland during World War II. On September 1, 1939, without declaring war, the Nazi German Army, Navy, and Air Forces invaded Poland from the north, west and south. Sixteen days later, on September 17, the Soviet Union also attacked Poland from the east. For Europe, the Nazi invasion of Poland marked the beginning of World War II; for Poland, the Soviet invasion also marked the beginning of a 50-year struggle against communism.

== Dedication of the museum ==
The Polish Home Army Museum was dedicated on November 12, 1989. It was founded by members of the Michigan Chapter of the Polish Home Army (Armia Krajowa) Association in the United States and the Detroit chapter of the Polish Resistance (AK) Foundation, with the generous support of the National Executive Committees of these organizations, and of the Polonia. Space for the museum was provided by Monsignor Stanislaw Milewski, the Chancellor of the St. Mary's Seminary and College in Orchard Lake, Michigan and Rev. Roman Nir, Director of Archives.

The rooms were completely renovated and adapted for display purposes, including the installation of a new lighting system. The Museum Committees and a few dedicated members donated much of their time to make this ambitious project a reality. Exhibits were donated by many veterans of the Home Army and their families. The Master plan for the display of the exhibits was developed by Dr. Thaddeus Malinski, the curator and implemented under the leadership of Julius Przesmycki, former chairman of the Museum Committee.

== The Poles in World War II ==
The Poles were beaten, but not conquered. The fight against the Germans continued, uninterrupted, for almost six years. After the war, when Poland was abandoned by her western allies and left under Soviet domination, resistance against communism continued for another 45 years. Finally, largely because of the Solidarity movement, freedom for Poland was regained in 1989.

=== The entrance ===
Facing the entrance to the museum is the symbol of ‘Polska Walcząca’: Fighting Poland, as seen in the title above. It was the mark of the Armia Krajowa, emblazoned on walls throughout German-occupied Poland. Symbol of resistance, sign of defiance, emblem of freedom, and declaration of unwavering intent - an important part of Polish history. Behind the ‘Polska Walcząca’ is displayed the standard of the Michigan chapter of the Polish Home Army (AK) Veterans Association.

=== The first room ===
The first room contains exhibits from the beginning of World War II, including the front pages of the Detroit newspapers dated September 1, 1939, with the headlines crying out: “War!”. The first room also depicts the history of the secret Polish Underground State and its fighting forces, the Home Army (Armia Krajowa). The Polish Home Army organized the most effective partisan and espionage forces of any allied nation. At its peak, in 1943, the AK numbered over 380,000 men and women. All were volunteers. One of the major accomplishments of the Home Army was the capture of an entire V-2 rocket, which was disassembled and flown to Britain.

Examples of the Secret underground press, which continued publishing almost until the day the Soviet Army marched into Poland, are also displayed, as are the numerous memorabilia donated by veterans of the AK and their families. All descriptions are in English.

=== The second room ===
The second room of the museum is dedicated to the Warsaw Uprising of 1944 and the suffering of the Polish people under the German and Soviet occupation of Poland. The Nazi concentration camps built by the Nazis on Polish territory were first occupied by Christian Poles, many of whom perished and later by the Jewish population, most of whom perished. The work of ‘Zegota’, a secret department of the Polish Underground State, dedicated to saving thousands of Jews, especially children, from the Nazi persecution, is described.

== The Warsaw Uprising ==
On August 1, 1944, the Home Army in Warsaw rose against the Germans as they were retreating under pressure from the Soviet offensive. The Red Army was only 15 miles away at the time. However; a few days after the uprising started, Joseph Stalin ordered his armies to stop and wait until the Germans had brutally suppressed the uprising and destroyed the city. Stalin wanted the Home Army and Polish leadership destroyed in order to make it easier for the Soviets to set up a planned puppet communist regime. After 63 days of fighting with insufficient arms against three German Divisions, including the elite Hermann Göring SS Panzer Division and the German Luftwaffe, the Home Army was forced to surrender. After the surrender and evacuation of POWs, as well as the remaining civilian population, the Germans blew up or burnt whatever buildings were left standing.

== Exhibits ==
The exhibits include several photographic displays, examples of arms and uniforms used by the Home Army, many documents and decorations, a few 1944 street plans of Warsaw showing Home Army and German positions at various stages of the battle, and many other sorts of memorabilia. There is also a display of memorabilia from POW and Nazi concentration camps.

=== Location ===
The Polish Home Army Museum in Orchard Lake, Michigan is located in the St. Mary's Preparatory Ark Building (#9), 3535 Indian Trail, Orchard Lake, MI 48324. To make an appointment or for information, contact 248-683-0412.
