= China National Film Museum =

Film museum in Beijing, China

- 中国电影博物馆
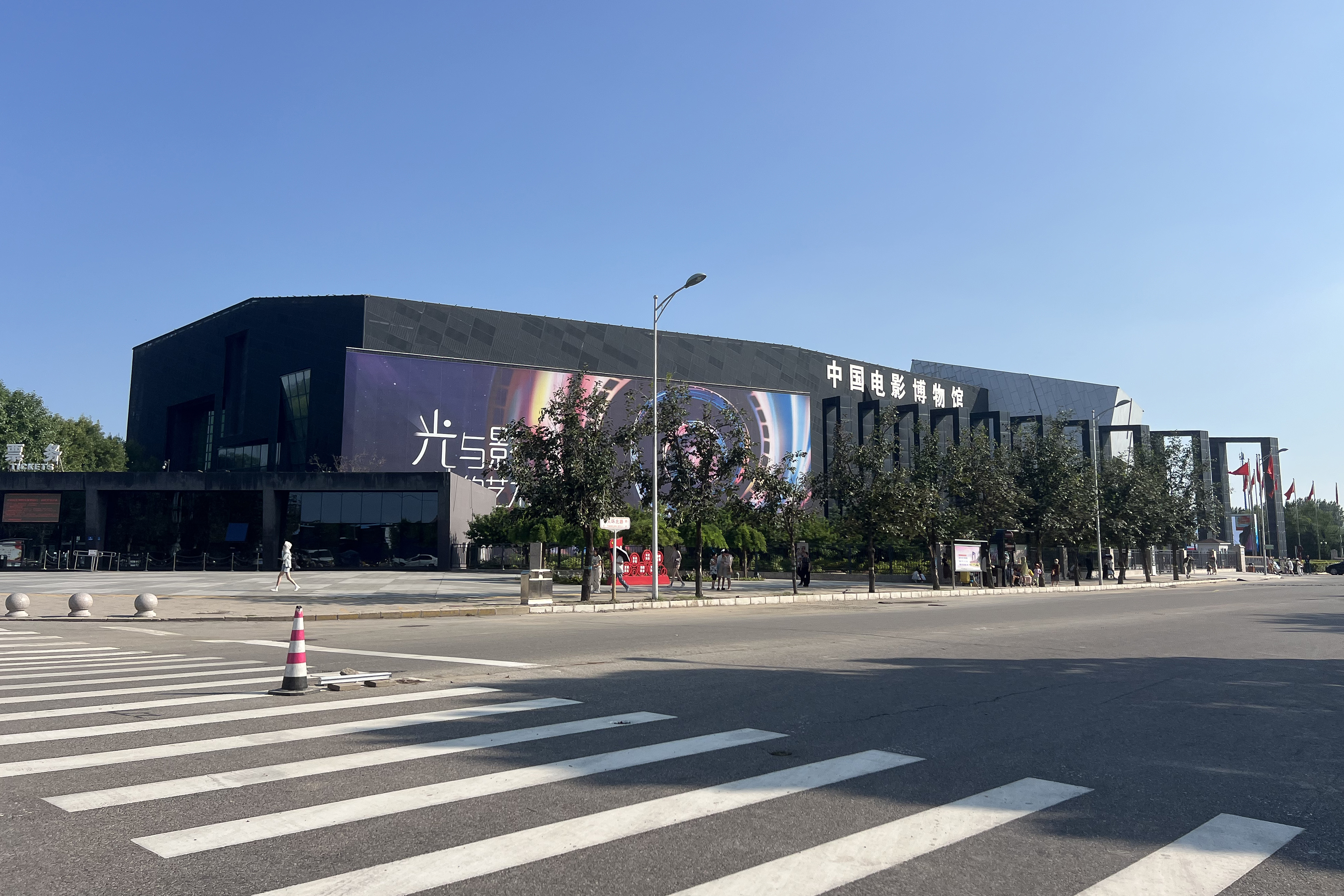
- Established: 2005
- Location: Beijing, China
- Coordinates: 39.996205°N 116.520936°E
- Type: Film
- Website: www.cnfm.org.cn

The China National Film Museum (CNFM) (中国电影博物馆) is the largest professional film museum in the world. Opened in Chaoyang in 2005, CNFM is designed to show the history of Chinese cinema. It is also used to host film technology expos.

== Location ==
The China National Film Museum is located northeast of Beijing, the capital city of China. CNFM occupies an area of 65 acres, with an architectural space of 38,000 square meters.

== Exhibition area ==
The museum has 20 permanent exhibition halls. In addition, there are multifunctional halls for exhibitions and meetings, as well as various temporary spaces. The museum also contains an expo area on the fourth floor. The museum also has one IMAX theatre, one digital projection theater, and three 35mm projection theatres.

== See also ==
- List of museums in China
