= Red Army Memorial Museum =

Cemetery and museum in Rugao, Jiangsu, China

The Red Army Memorial Museum, also known as the Chinese Workers' and Peasants' Red Army Fourteenth Army Memorial Hall, is a cemetery and tourist attraction in Rugao, Jiangsu. It was established in 1952, designed by Professor Qi Kang to commemorate those in the 14^{th} Army who died in the Land Revolution period.

== Architecture and Layout ==
The Museum is split into 5 key parts, in total covering over 19.5 hectares. This includes an education center; an expansion training base, used to allow for visitors to walk along the route of the Long March; a Gate Tower and a Memorial Hall.

== See also ==
- List of museums in China

== Sources ==
- Official website
- Abercrombie
- Gangu News
