= Suzhou Museum of Opera and Theatre =

Museum in Suzhou, Jiangsu, China

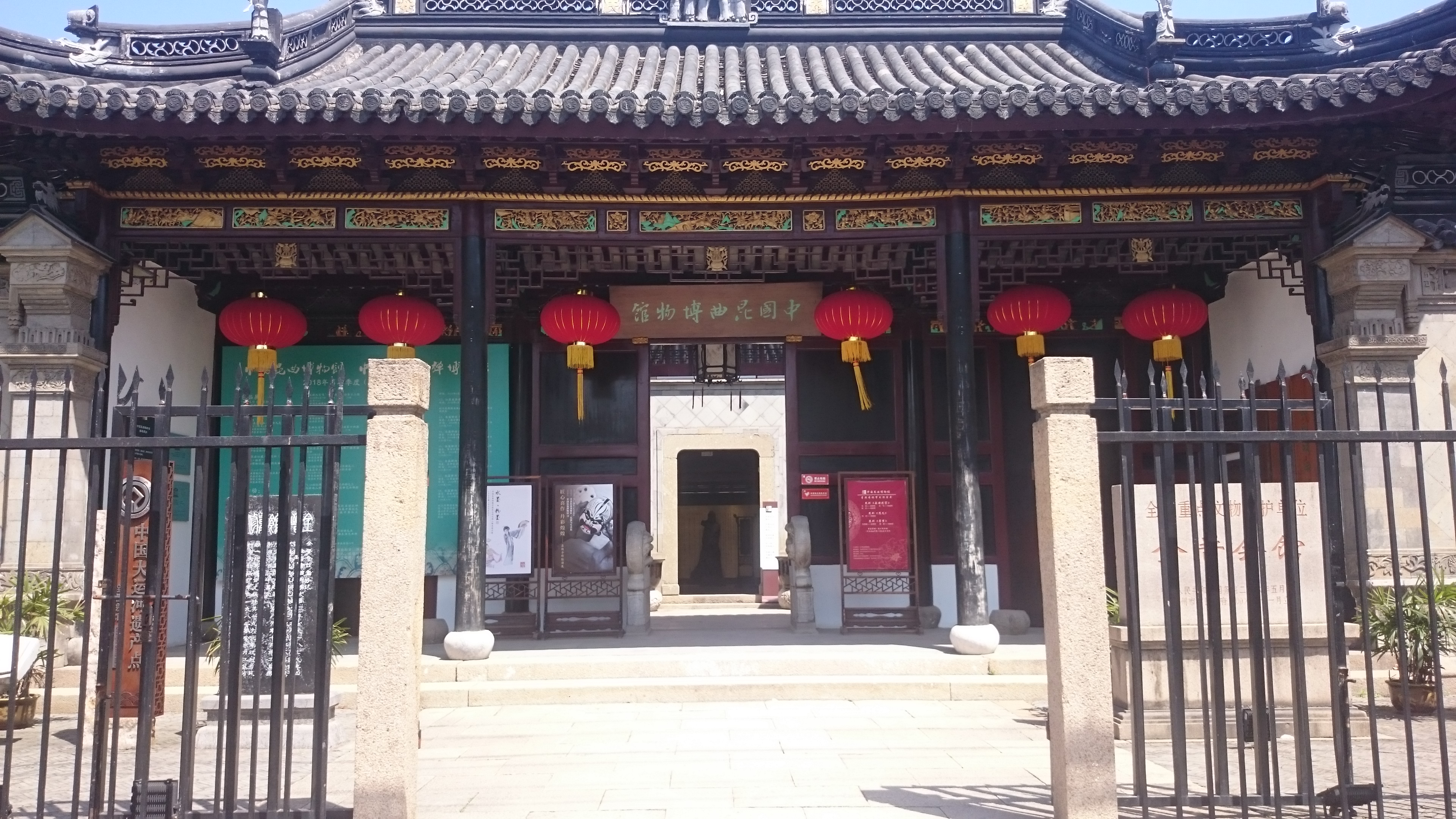
- Established: 1986
- Location: People's Republic of China
- Coordinates: 31°19′N 120°38′E
- Website: www.kunopera.com.cn
- Location of Suzhou Museum of Opera and Theatre

The Suzhou Museum of Opera and Theatre or China Kunqu Museum is a theatre museum in Suzhou, China. The museum was established in 1986. It is located in a Ming dynasty theatre of latticed wood and has display halls with old musical instruments, hand-copied books, lyrics and scores, masks and costumes. It also has other paraphernalia including a life size orchestra and photographs of performers. The museum also covers kunqu's 500-year-old history. The museum is often used for performances today and the teahouse stages daily shows.
