= Harbin Museum of Jewish History and Culture =

Museum in Harbin, China

- 哈尔滨犹太历史文化博物馆
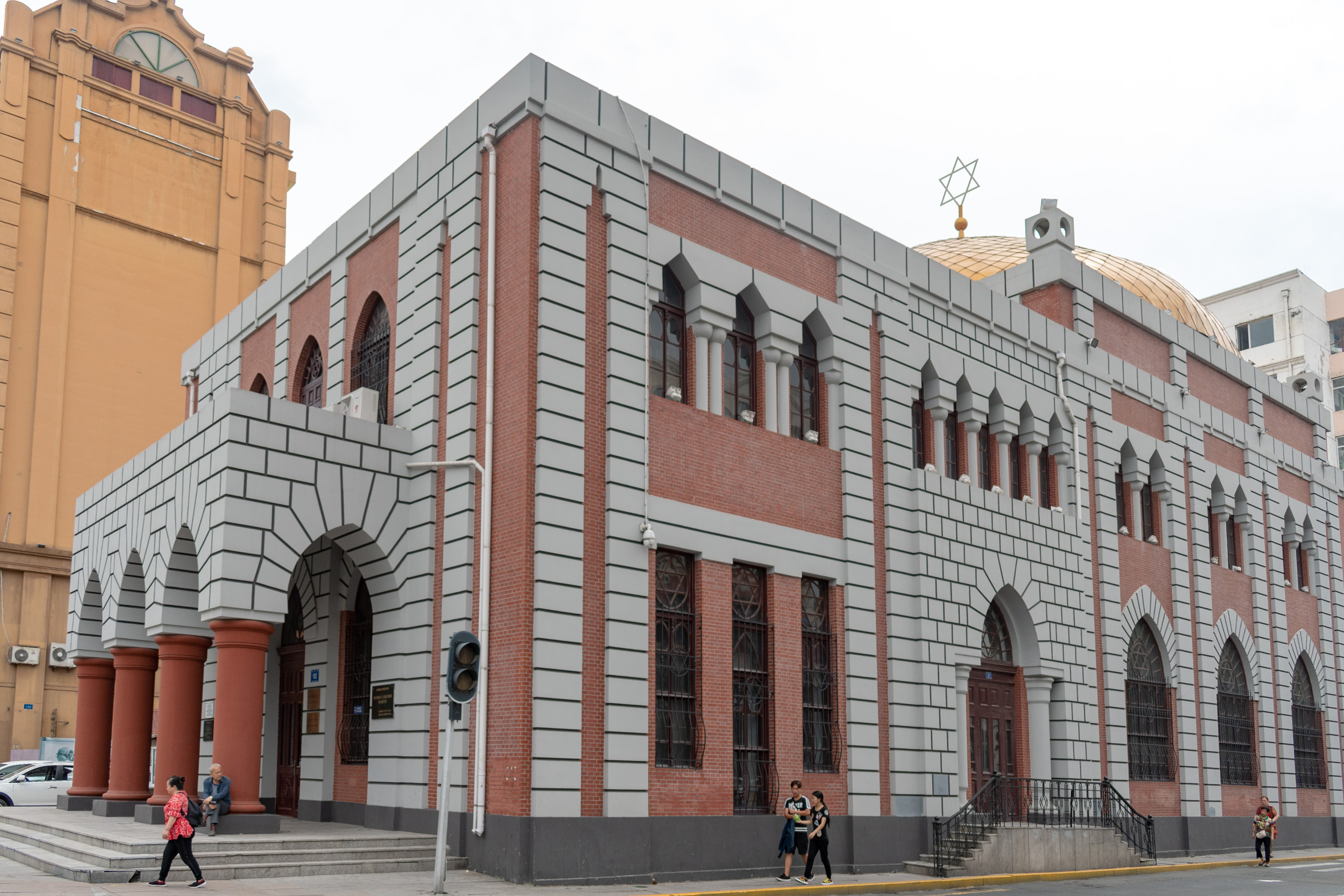
- View of the Harbin Museum from outside
- Location: 162 Jingwei Street, Daoli District, Harbin, China
- Coordinates: 45.7684°N 126.6171°E
- Type: History
- Architect: Joseph Yurievich Lievkin

Harbin Museum of Jewish History and Culture (Chinese: 哈尔滨犹太历史文化博物馆; pinyin: Hā'ěrbīn Yóutài Lìshǐ Wénhuà Bówùguǎn) is a museum commemorating the Jewish diaspora in Harbin, China from early 1900s to 1950s. It is located at the former site of the New Synagogue of Harbin (哈尔滨犹太新会堂). The museum features documents, photographs, films, and personal items documenting the lives of some of the more than 20,000 Jewish residents in Harbin.

== Exhibitions ==
The first floor of the museum shows photographs, paintings of several buildings in Harbin constructed by Jews in the first half of the 20th century.

The exhibitions on the second and third floors present education, industry, art and music of Jews in Harbin.

== Architecture ==
Built in 1918 as Harbin New Synagogue after Harbin General Synagogue, which is now the Harbin Old Synagogue Concert Hall, the new synagogue was the largest of its kind in China. The synagogue was closed in 1950s as Jews in Harbin were leaving and heading for destinations such as Israel, the United States and Australia.

In 2004, Harbin municipal government restored the synagogue to its original architectural style and transferred the building into the current museum.

== See also ==
- History of the Jews in China
