= Timeline of Chinese history =

Timeline of Chinese history

The history of China and its dynasties contain many important legal and territorial changes and political events.

Dates prior to 841 BC, the beginning of the Gonghe Regency, are provisional and subject to dispute.

== Prehistory ==
80,000 BC	H. sapiens appears in modern Dao County, Hunan.
20,000 BC	Pottery was used in Xianren Cave.
7600 BC	The Zengpiyan culture appeared.
7600 BC	Pigs were first domesticated in China.
7500 BC	The Pengtoushan culture appeared.
7500 BC	Rice was first domesticated in China.
7000 BC	The Peiligang culture appeared.
6600 BC	The Jiahu symbols were first used at Jiahu.
6500 BC	The Cishan culture appeared.
6000 BC	Dogs were first domesticated in China.
4000 BC	Symbols were carved into pottery at Banpo.
3630 BC	Silk processing was invented by the Yangshao culture.

== 3rd millennium BC ==
=== Antiquity ===
Year	Date	Event
2570 BC		Silk was produced by the Liangzhu culture.
2500 BC		Battle of Banquan: The forces of the divine farmer Shennong were repelled by a force of tribes allied under the Yellow Emperor.
2500 BC		Battle of Zhuolu: A combined army of tribes under the Yellow Emperor defeated Hmong invasion at Zhuolo.
2366 BC		Zhi became king.

=== 22nd century BC ===
Year	Date	Event
2200 BC		Great Flood: Yu the Great completed a drainage system which ended the periodic and destructive flooding of the Yellow and Yangtze Rivers. (Reliable Archaeological discoveries depict that it happened around 1920BC.)
2200 BC		The Nine Tripod Cauldrons were forged from metal given in tribute to Yu by the Nine Provinces.
2117 BC	12 May	Tai Kang became king of the Xia dynasty.

=== 21st century BC ===
Year	Date	Event
2075 BC		Xiang of Xia became king of the Xia dynasty.
2047 BC		Xiang was murdered and displaced as king on the orders of the warlord Han Zhuo. His pregnant wife fled the capital Shangqiu.
2047 BC		Xiang's wife gave birth to a son, Shao Kang.
2007 BC		The people of Shangqiu welcomed an army loyal to Shao into the city. Han committed suicide.

== 2nd–1st millennia BC ==
=== 19th century BC ===
Year	Date	Event
1831 BC		Bu abdicated in favor of his younger brother Jiong of Xia.
1831 BC		Mount Tai earthquake: An earthquake occurred at Mount Tai.
1810 BC		Jiong was succeeded by his son Jin of Xia.

=== 18th century BC ===
Year	Date	Event
1789 BC		Jin was succeeded by his cousin, Bu's son Kong Jia.
1758 BC		Kong was succeeded by his son Gao of Xia.
1747 BC		Gao was succeeded by his son Fa of Xia.
1728 BC		Fa was succeeded by his son Jie of Xia.

=== 17th century BC ===
Year	Date	Event
1675 BC		Jie was succeeded by Tang of Shang, marking the beginning of the Shang dynasty.

=== 16th century BC ===
Year	Date	Event
1600 BC		Battle of Mingtiao: the Shang clan (later Shang dynasty) overthrow the corrupt and last emperor of the Xia dynasty

=== 15th century BC ===
Year	Date	Event
1500 BC		The Erligang culture appeared.

=== 13th century BC ===
Year	Date	Event
1290 BC		Pan Geng became king of the Shang dynasty.
1290 BC		The capital of the Shang dynasty was moved from Yan to Yin.
1250 BC		Wu Ding became king of the Shang dynasty.
1250 BC		Oracle bones were first used for divination; evidence of oracle bone script first appears.

=== 12th century BC ===
Year	Date	Event
1200 BC		Wu's wife, the general and high priestess Fu Hao, died and was buried at the tomb of Fu Hao in Yinxu.
1192 BC		Wu died. He was succeeded by his son Zu Geng of Shang.
1170 BC		Geng Ding became king of the Shang dynasty.
1147 BC		Geng was succeeded by his son Wu Yi of Shang.
1112 BC		Wu was killed by lightning while out hunting. He was succeeded by his son Wen Ding.
1101 BC		Wen was succeeded by his son Di Yi.

=== 11th century BC ===
Year	Date	Event
1076 BC		Di died.
1075 BC		Di was succeeded as king of the Shang dynasty by his son King Zhou of Shang.
1050 BC		King Wen of Zhou died.
1047 BC		Zhou took Daji as his concubine.
1046 BC		Battle of Muye: The forces of the predynastic Zhou, led by King Wu of Zhou and aided by Shang dynasty defectors, dealt a bloody defeat to Shang forces at Muye, near Yinxu.
1046 BC		Zhou committed suicide by burning himself with his jewels on the Deer Terrace Pavilion.
1043 BC		Wu died.
1042 BC		Wu was succeeded by his son King Cheng of Zhou.
1034 BC		Chinese bronze inscriptions came into use.
1021 BC		Cheng died.
1020 BC		Cheng was succeeded by his son King Kang of Zhou.

=== 10th century BC ===
Year	Date	Event
1000 BC		The Classic of Poetry was compiled.
996 BC		Kang died.
976 BC		King Mu of Zhou became king of the Zhou dynasty.
964 BC		Mu led an unsuccessful expedition against the Quanrong.
922 BC		Mu died. He was succeeded by his son King Gong of Zhou.

=== 9th century BC ===
Year	Date	Event
900 BC		Gong died.
899 BC		Gong's son Ji Jian, King Yi of Zhou became king of the Zhou dynasty.
892 BC		Ji Jian died.
891 BC		Ji Jian's uncle, Mu's son King Xiao of Zhou became king of the Zhou dynasty.
886 BC		Xiao died.
885 BC		Ji Jian's son Ji Xie, King Yi of Zhou became king of the Zhou dynasty.
878 BC		Ji Xie died.
877 BC		Ji Xie's son King Li of Zhou became king of the Zhou dynasty.
842 BC		A popular revolt forced Li into exile near Linfen.
841 BC		The Gonghe Regency came into power.
828 BC		Li died.
827 BC		Li's son King Xuan of Zhou became king of the Zhou dynasty.

=== 8th century BC ===
Year	Date	Event
782 BC		Xuan died.
781 BC		Xuan's son King You of Zhou became king of the Zhou dynasty.
779 BC		You took Bao Si as his concubine.
771 BC		The Marquess of Shen, whose daughter had been replaced by Bao Si as queen, led an attack on Haojing in alliance with the Quanrong. You and Bao's son Bofu were killed.
770 BC		You's son King Ping of Zhou became king of the Zhou dynasty.
770 BC		Ping moved the Zhou capital east to Luoyang.
720 BC		Ping died.
719 BC		Ping's grandson King Huan of Zhou became king of the Zhou dynasty.
707 BC		Battle of Xuge: Huan, in coalition with the Zhou vassal states Chen, Cai and Wey, led a punitive expedition against Zheng. The coalition was defeated and Huan was wounded.

=== 7th century BC ===
Year	Date	Event
697 BC	11 may	Huan died.
696 BC		Huan's son King Zhuang of Zhou became king of the Zhou dynasty.
685 BC		Duke Huan of Qi became duke of Qi.
682 BC		Zhuang died.
681 BC		Zhuang's son King Xi of Zhou became king of the Zhou dynasty.
677 BC		Xi died.
676 BC		Xi's son King Hui of Zhou became king of the Zhou dynasty.
652 BC		Hui died.
645 BC		The Qi chancellor Guan Zhong died.
632 BC		Battle of Chengpu: Jin and its allies decisively defeated a coalition led by Chu.
630 BC		Sunshu Ao was born.
619 BC		Xiang died.
618 BC		Xiang's son King Qing of Zhou became king of the Zhou dynasty.
613 BC		Qing died.
612 BC		Qing's son King Kuang of Zhou became king of the Zhou dynasty.
607 BC		Kuang died.
606 BC		Kuang's brother King Ding of Zhou became king of the Zhou dynasty.

=== 6th century BC ===
Year	Date	Event
600 BC		Knife money came into use.
595 BC		Battle of Bi: Chu decisively defeated Jin at Bi, near modern Xingyang.
586 BC		Ding died.
585 BC		Ding's son King Jian of Zhou became king of the Zhou dynasty.
575 BC		Battle of Yanling: A numerically superior Chu force was defeated by Jin in modern Yanling County. King Gong of Chu was injured.
572 BC		Jian died.
571 BC		Jian's son King Ling of Zhou became king of the Zhou dynasty.
551 BC		Confucius was born.
548 BC		The earliest surviving reference to Go appeared.
545 BC		Ling died.
544 BC		Ling's son Ji Gui, King Jing of Zhou became king of the Zhou dynasty.
544 BC		The Chinese people were first divided into a caste system of four occupations.
543 BC		The Zheng prime minister Zichan established the state's first written civil code.
520 BC		Ji Gui died. He was succeeded by his son King Dao of Zhou.
520 BC		Dao was murdered by his brother.
519 BC		Dao's brother Ji Gai, King Jing of Zhou became king of the Zhou dynasty.
515 BC		The Wu king Liao was killed by the assassin Zhuan Zhu.
514 BC		King Helü of Wu became king of Wu.
506 BC		Battle of Boju: Wu decisively defeated a numerically superior Chu force at Boju.

=== 5th century BC ===
Year	Date	Event
500 BC		Cast iron was first invented in China.
486 BC		The Wu king King Fuchai of Wu ordered the building of the Han Canal.
484 BC		Wu Zixu died.
482 BC		The Yue king King Goujian of Yue captured the Wu capital in a surprise assault.
479 BC		The generally agreed upon date of Confucius' death.
477 BC		Ji Gai died.
475 BC		Ji Gai's son King Yuan of Zhou became king of the Zhou dynasty.
473 BC		Wu was annexed by Yue.
470 BC		Mozi was born.
469 BC		Yuan died.
518 BC		Yuan's son King Zhending of Zhou became king of the Zhou dynasty.
465 BC		Goujian died.
441 BC		Zhending died. He was succeeded by his son King Ai of Zhou.
441 BC		Ai was murdered and succeeded as king by his younger brother King Si of Zhou.
441 BC		Si was murdered by his brother King Kao of Zhou.
440 BC		Kao became king of the Zhou dynasty.
432 BC		The tomb of Marquis Yi of Zeng was constructed.
426 BC		Kao died.
425 BC		Kao's son King Weilie of Zhou became king of the Zhou dynasty.
403 BC		Partition of Jin: Weilie recognized the Jin nobles Marquess Wen of Wei, Marquess Lie of Zhao and Marquess Jing of Han as marquesses, granting de jure independence from Jin to the states of Wei, Zhao and Han.
402 BC		Weilie died.
401 BC		Weilie's son King An of Zhou became king of the Zhou dynasty.

=== 4th century BC ===
Year	Date	Event
400 BC		Gan De was born.
400 BC		Shi Shen was born.
400 BC		The earliest surviving Chinese maps appeared.
400 BC		The first Chinese star catalogue was compiled.
389 BC		The Zuo Zhuan was published.
386 BC		The city of Handan was founded to serve as the Zhao capital.
381 BC		The Chu prime minister Wu Qi was murdered by nobles at the funeral of its king King Dao of Chu.
376 BC		An died.
375 BC		An's son King Lie of Zhou became king of the Zhou dynasty.
375 BC		Zheng was annexed by Han.
370 BC		Zhuang Zhou was born.
369 BC		Lie died.
368 BC		Lie's brother King Xian of Zhou became king of the Zhou dynasty.
361 BC		Duke Xiao of Qin became duke of Qin.
356 BC		Xiao's adviser Shang Yang implemented a legal code in Qin based on the Canon of Laws which established punishment for complicity in a crime, established a system of military ranks, and implemented policies encouraging the cultivation of unsettled land.
354 BC		Battle of Guiling: Wei laid siege to the Zhao capital Handan.
353 BC		Battle of Guiling: The Wei army fled Handan in response to reports of a Qi attack on their capital Daliang and were defeated by Qi forces at Guiling, in modern Changyuan County.
342 BC		Battle of Maling: Qi dealt Wei a bloody defeat.
342 BC		The crossbow was first used in China.
338 BC		Xiao died. He was succeeded by his son King Huiwen of Qin.
338 BC		Shang and his family were executed by dismemberment on charges of treason.
321 BC		Xian died.
320 BC		Xian's son King Shenjing of Zhou became king of the Zhou dynasty.
319 BC		The Confucian Mencius became a Qi official.
316 BC		Sun Bin died.
316 BC		Shu was conquered and annexed by Qin.
316 BC		Ba was conquered and annexed by Qin.
315 BC		Shenjing died.
314 BC		Shenjing's son King Nan of Zhou became king of the Zhou dynasty.
311 BC		Huiwen died.
310 BC		Huiwen's son King Wu of Qin became king of Qin.
310 BC		Xun Kuang was born.
307 BC		The Zhou king King Wuling of Zhao ordered his cavalry to begin wearing clothes fashioned after those of the Donghu and Xiongnu peoples.
307 BC		Wu died.
306 BC		Wu's brother King Zhaoxiang of Qin became king of Qin.
305 BC		Zou Yan was born. The Tsinghua Bamboo Slips were written.

=== 3rd century BC ===
Year	Date	Event
300 BC		Erya was published.
300 BC		The Guodian Chu Slips were produced.
293 BC		Battle of Yique: Qin dealt a bloody defeat to a Wei-Han alliance.
278 BC		Qin conquered the Chu capital Ying.
278 BC		The Chu poet Qu Yuan wrote Lament for Ying and drowned himself in the Miluo River because he could not bear his exile any long or to his despair for the state of his fellow countrymen
262 BC	April	Battle of Changping: Zhao intercepted a Qin invasion of the commandery of Shangdang .
260 BC	July	Battle of Changping: Qin forces encircled the Zhao army, forcing its surrender. The Zhao general Zhao Kuo was killed in action.
260 BC	July	Battle of Changping: The captured Zhao soldiers were executed.
259 BC	18 February	Qin Shi Huang is born.
256 BC	26 February	Nan submitted to Zhaoxiang and took the title Duke of West Zhou.
256 BC		Nan died. His territory was annexed by Qin.
256 BC		The Dujiangyan irrigation system was built.
251 BC		Zhaoxiang died.
250 BC		The first drawings of the repeating crossbow appeared in Chu records.
250 BC	13 September	Zhaoxiang's son King Xiaowen of Qin became king of Qin.
250 BC	15 September	Xiaowen died. He was succeeded by his son King Zhuangxiang of Qin.
247 BC	7 May	Zhuangxiang died. He was succeeded by his son Qin Shi Huang.
246 BC		The Zhengguo Canal was completed by Zheng Guo of Qin.
230 BC		Qin's wars of unification: Qin invaded Han.
227 BC		Jing Ke failed in an assassination attempt on Qin Shi Huang.
225 BC		Qin conquered Wei.
223 BC		Qin conquered Chu.
222 BC		Qin conquered Yan.
222 BC		Qin conquered Zhao.
221 BC		Qin conquered Qi.
221 BC		The Heirloom Seal of the Realm was carved.
220 BC		Qin Shi Huang took the title Qin Shi Huang, first emperor of China.
220 BC		Construction began on the Great Wall of China.
220 BC		Chancellor Li Si standardized the Chinese writing system with the creation of Small Seal Script.
214 BC		The Lingqu Canal was built.
213 BC		Burning of books and burying of scholars: All copies of the Classic of Poetry, the Book of Documents and works of the Hundred Schools of Thought were ordered burned.
210 BC	10 September	Qin Shi Huang died from mercury pills made by his alchemists and court physicians; ironically these pills were meant to make Qin Shi Huang immortal.
210 BC		Qin Shi Huang was buried with the Terracotta Army in the Mausoleum of the First Qin Emperor.
210 BC	October	Qin Shi Huang's son Qin Er Shi succeeded him as emperor of China.
209 BC		The Xiongnu chanyu Modu Chanyu established the Xiongnu Empire on the Eurasian Steppe.
209 BC	July	Dazexiang Uprising: Military officers Chen Sheng and Wu Guang began a rebellion for fear of being executed after failing to arrive at their posts.
209 BC	December	Dazexiang Uprising: Chen Sheng and Wu Guang were assassinated by their own men.
208 BC		Li was executed on charges of treason. Zhao Gao, who had framed him, was appointed chancellor in his stead.
207 BC		Battle of Julu: Chu forces led by the warlord Xiang Yu defeated a numerically superior Qin force, killing a large fraction of the Qin army.
207 BC	October	Zhao Gao had Qin Er Shi killed. Qin Er Shi's nephew Ziying succeeded him.
207 BC		The Chu general Emperor Gaozu of Han entered the Qin capital Xianyang.
207 BC	December	Ziying killed Zhao.
207 BC	December	Ziying surrendered to Gaozu.
206 BC		Feast at Hong Gate: Gaozu fled a banquet after it became clear that Xiang had invited him there to be killed.
206 BC		Xiang led an army into Xianyang, burned the Epang Palace and killed Ziying and the royal family.
205 BC		Battle of Jingxing: Han forces dealt a decisive defeat to a numerically superior Zhao army at Jingxing Pass.
204 BC		The Qin general Zhao Tuo established the state of Nanyue.
202 BC		Battle of Gaixia: Gaozu's Han forces destroyed the Western Chu army led by Xiang in modern Suzhou.
202 BC		Gaozu took the title emperor and established his capital in Luoyang.

=== 2nd century BC ===
Year	Date	Event
200 BC		Battle of Baideng: The Xiongnu encircled and besieged a superior Han force.
200 BC		The multi-tube seed drill was invented.
195 BC	1 June	Gaozu died. He was succeeded by his son Emperor Hui of Han.
193 BC		The Han chancellor Xiao He died.
190 BC		Chang'an became the eastern terminus of the Silk Road to Europe.
188 BC		Hui died. He was succeeded by his son Emperor Qianshao of Han.
186 BC		Zhang Liang died.
184 BC		Qianshao was deposed and killed on the orders of the empress dowager Empress Lü Zhi. He was succeeded by his brother Emperor Houshao of Han.
180 BC		Lü Clan Disturbance: Houshao was deposed by imperial officials led by Chen Ping and Zhou Bo. He was succeeded by his uncle, Gaozu's son Emperor Wen of Han.
168 BC		The Mawongdui Silk Texts were buried at Mawongdui.
157 BC	Summer	Wen died. He was succeeded by his son Emperor Jing of Han.
141 BC	9 March	Jing died. He was succeeded by his son Emperor Wu of Han.
140 BC		Wu adopted Confucianism.
139 BC		The Eight Immortals of Huainan published the Huainanzi.
135 BC		Han campaigns against Minyue: The Han dynasty invaded Minyue after a plea for assistance from its vassal state Nanyue.
135 BC		Southward expansion of the Han dynasty: The Han dynasty annexed Minyue.
133 BC	June	Battle of Mayi: A Han deception failed to lure the Xiongnu into an ambush at Mayi.
125 BC		Zhang Qian returned to the Han court to report on his travels to the kingdoms of Dayuan, Kangju, the Greco-Bactrian and Indo-Greek Kingdoms, Parthia and Mesopotamia.
119 BC	January	Battle of Mobei: A Han expedition into the Orkhon Valley began which would deal a decisive and bloody defeat to the Xiongnu.
111 BC		Han campaigns against Minyue: The Minyue rump state of Dongyue was invaded and annexed by the Han dynasty.
111 BC		Han–Nanyue War: The Han dynasty conquered and annexed Nanyue.
109 BC		Han campaigns against Dian: The Han dynasty invaded and annexed the Dian Kingdom.
108 BC	December	Battle of Loulan: Han forces attacked the Loulan Kingdom at Lop Nur.
102 BC		Han forces laid siege to Kokand.

=== 1st century BC ===
Year	Date	Event
100 BC		Steel was first used in China.
91 BC		Sima Qian completed the Records of the Grand Historian.
87 BC	29 March	Wu died. He was succeeded by his young son Emperor Zhao of Han, with Huo Guang, Jin Midi and Shangguang Jie acting as regents.
86 BC		Jin died.
74 BC		Zhao died.
74 BC	18 July	The Prince of Changyi was appointed emperor of Han by Huo Guang.
74 BC	14 August	The Prince of Changyi was deposed.
74 BC		Huo appointed Wu's great-grandson, then a commoner, Emperor Xuan of Han.
67 BC	December	Battle of Jushi: Han forces defeated the people of the Gushi culture, at that time subject to the Xiongnu, at Jiaohe in modern Turpan.
60 BC		The Protectorate of the Western Regions was established.
49 BC		Xuan died.
48 BC		Xuan's son Emperor Yuan of Han became emperor of the Han dynasty.
48 BC		Consort Ban was born.
40 BC		The earliest surviving Chinese record of the treadle-operated tilt hammer appeared.
37 BC		Jing Fang died.
36 BC	December	Battle of Zhizhi: A Han force breached and destroyed a fortress occupied by the Xiongnu chanyu Zhizhi Chanyu at Taraz, killing him.
33 BC		Yuan died. He was succeeded by his son Emperor Cheng of Han.
30 BC		The earliest surviving mention of the wheelbarrow appeared.
18 BC		Liu Xiang compiled the Biographies of Exemplary Women.
7 BC		Cheng died. He was succeeded by his nephew Emperor Ai of Han.
1 BC		Ai died.
1 BC		Ai's young cousin Emperor Ping of Han was appointed emperor of the Han dynasty, with Wang Mang acting as regent.

== 1st–2nd millennia ==
=== 1st century ===
Year	Date	Event
1		The first model of a stern-mounted rudder was produced.
2		A census counted fifty-nine million people in the Han empire.
3		Ping established a national school system. Ban Biao, first author of the Book of Han, is born.
6	3 February	Ping died after being poisoned by Wang, who became acting emperor.
8		Liu Xin completed a star catalogue and calculated the length of the year.
9		Wang declared himself emperor of the Xin dynasty.
9		Wang introduced the well-field system of land distribution and agricultural production.
10		Wang introduced an income tax of ten percent for professionals and skilled laborers.
10		Wang outlawed the private use of crossbows.
12		Wang abandoned the well-field system under pressure from the aristocracy.
17		Wang imposed government monopolies on liquor, salt, iron, coinage, forestry, and fishing.
17		Mother Lü initiated a rebellion against a county magistrate in Haiqu County, near modern Rizhao.
18		Yang Xiong dies.
23		Battle of Kunyang: Lülin forces broke the siege of Kunyang, in modern Ye County, by a vastly superior Xin army.
23	6 October	Lülin rebels stormed the Weiyang Palace and killed Wang. The Gengshi Emperor ascended the throne, restoring the Han dynasty.
25		Red Eyebrows Rebellions: The Gengshi Emperor was executed.
25		Red Eyebrows Rebellions: The Red Eyebrows appointed Liu Penzi their emperor.
25	5 August	The Han warlord Emperor Guangwu of Han took the title emperor.
27		Red Eyebrows Rebellions: The Red Eyebrows surrendered to the Han dynasty.
31		Du Shi invented waterwheel-powered bellows for smelting cast iron.
32		Ban Gu, co-author of the Book of Han, is born.
33		A blockade of the Yangtze River by the rebel Gongsun Shu was broken by Han castle ships.
43		Second Chinese domination of Vietnam: Vietnam fell into Han control.
45		Ban Zhao, China's first female historian, is born.
52		The Yuejue Shu was written.
57	29 March	Guangwu died. He was succeeded by his son Emperor Ming of Han.
58		The Han chancellor Deng Yu died.
65		Ming's half brother Liu Ying converted to Buddhism.
68		The Buddhist White Horse Temple was established in Luoyang.
73	February	Battle of Yiwulu: A punitive Han expedition against the Xiongnu captured territory in the area of modern Hami City.
75		Ming died. He was succeeded by his son Emperor Zhang of Han.
83		Wang Chong correctly theorized the nature of the water cycle.
87		Yuan An was appointed situ.
88		Zhang died. He was succeeded by his son Emperor He of Han.
89	June	Battle of the Altai Mountains: Han and allied forces defeated the army of the Northern Chanyu and accepted the surrender of two hundred thousand Xiongnu soldiers in the Altai Mountains.
97		The Han general Ban Chao sent the envoy Gan Ying to the outskirts of the Roman Empire.
100		Xu Shen completed the Shuowen Jiezi.

=== 2nd century ===
Year	Date	Event
105		Cai Lun invents papermaking.
105	13 February	He died.
105		He's infant son Emperor Shang of Han was made emperor of Han with empress dowager Deng Sui acting as regent.
106		Shang died.
106		Shang's young cousin Emperor An of Han became emperor, with Deng Sui continuing to act as regent.
111		Ban Zhao completed the Book of Han.
120		Zhang Heng completed a star catalogue which also argued for a spherical moon that reflects light.
125		Zhang invented the first hydraulic-powered armillary sphere.
125		The earliest known Chinese depiction of a mechanical distance-marking odometer was drawn.
125	30 April	An died.
125		The Marquess of Beixiang became emperor of the Han dynasty.
125		The Marquess of Beixiang died.
125		An's son Emperor Shun of Han became emperor of the Han dynasty.
132		Zhang invented a seismometer capable of indicating the direction of earthquakes.
132		Cai Yong was born.
142		The Cantong qi was published.
144		Shun died. He was succeeded by his infant son Emperor Chong of Han, with empress dowager Liang Na and her brother Liang Ji acting as regents.
145		Chong died.
145		Chong's young third cousin Emperor Zhi of Han became emperor of the Han dynasty, with Liang Na acting as regent.
146		Liang Ji poisoned Zhi, killing him.
146	1 August	Emperor Huan of Han became emperor of the Han dynasty.
147		Lokaksema was born.
148		The Buddhist missionary An Shigao arrived in China.
166		Sino-Roman relations: A Roman envoy arrived at the Han capital Luoyang.
166		Disasters of the Partisan Prohibitions: Several ministers and some two hundred university students, who had opposed the influence of corrupt eunuchs at the royal court, were arrested.
168		Huan died.
168		Emperor Ling of Han became emperor of the Han dynasty.
177		Cai Wenji was born.
179		The earliest known reference to The Nine Chapters on the Mathematical Art appeared.
180		Ding Huan invented the rotary fan.
184		Yellow Turban Rebellion: The Taoist sect leader Zhang Jue called on his followers in the Han provinces to rebel against the government.
184	Winter	Liang Province Rebellion: The Qiang people launched a rebellion against Han authority in the area of modern Wuwei.
185		Zhi Yao first translated Buddhist texts into Chinese.
189	13 May	Ling died.
189		Ling's son Liu Bian became emperor of the Han dynasty.
189		Forces loyal to the warlords Yuan Shao and Yuan Shu massacred some two thousand eunuchs in the Han capital Luoyang.
189	28 September	The Han general Dong Zhuo deposed Liu Bian as emperor and appointed his brother Emperor Xian of Han in his stead.
190	February	Campaign against Dong Zhuo: A coalition led by Yuan Shao gathered at Hangu Pass in anticipation of an expedition against Dong.
192	22 May	Dong was assassinated by his foster son Lü Bu.
194		Sun Ce's conquests in Jiangdong: The warlord Sun Ce attacked and conquered territory administered by Lu Kang.
197		War between Cao Cao and Zhang Xiu almost take Cao Cao's life. Cao Cao's oldest son perished in the battle, but Zhang Xiu later (199) surrendered to Cao Cao to face Yuan Shao together.
198	Winter	Battle of Xiapi: The allied forces of the warlords Cao Cao and Liu Bei defeated an army loyal to Lü Bu in Xuzhou.
200	November	Battle of Guandu: Forces loyal to Cao Cao dealt a bloody defeat to Yuan Shao near the confluence of the Bian and Yellow Rivers.

=== 3rd century ===
Year	Date	Event
204		The warlord Gongsun Kang established the Daifang Commandery on the Korean Peninsula.
208	Winter	Battle of Red Cliffs: Forces loyal to the warlords Liu Bei and Sun Quan decisively repelled Cao Cao in an attempted invasion across the Yangtze River.
211	September	Battle of Tong Pass: Cao Cao defeated an alliance of anti-Han rebels in modern Tongguan County, securing his control over Guanzhong.
215		Liu Bei's takeover of Yi Province: Liu Zhang, the governor of Yi Province in modern Sichuan and Chongqing, surrendered Chengdu to Liu Bei.
215		Battle of Xiaoyao Ford: A plague outbreak forced Sun Quan to abandon the attempted conquest from Cao Cao of a fortress at Hefei.
219		Battle of Han River: Liu Bei ambushed and dealt a bloody defeat to Cao Cao's army in Hanzhong.
219	September	Battle of Fancheng: Cao Cao repelled an attack by Liu Bei's general Guan Yu in modern Fancheng District, at great cost to both sides.
219	December	Lü Meng's invasion of Jing Province: Liu Bei's generals Shi Ren and Mi Fang defected to Sun Quan, surrendering to his general Lü Meng the main defense posts of Jingzhou.
220	10 December	End of the Han dynasty: Cao Cao's son Cao Pi forced Xian to abdicate the throne and declared himself emperor of Cao Wei.
221		Liu Bei declared himself emperor of Shu Han.
221		Battle of Xiaoting: The Shu Han generals Wu Ban and Feng Xi attacked and destroyed an Eastern Wu army at Wu Gorge.
222		Sun Quan declared himself king of Eastern Wu.
222		Battle of Xiaoting: Eastern Wu forces attacked and burned the Shu Han camps and dealt serious casualties during their retreat.
223	10 June	Liu Bei died. He was succeeded by his son Liu Shan, with Li Yan and chancellor Zhuge Liang acting as regents.
225	Autumn	Zhuge Liang's Southern Campaign: The rebel leader Meng Huo surrendered Nanzhong to Zhuge Liang.
226	29 June	Cao Pi died. He was succeeded by Cao Rui, who may have been his son or his wife Lady Zhen's by a previous marriage to Yuan Xi.
228		Battle of Jieting: Cao Wei forces encircled and destroyed a Shu Han army guarding the supply line for an invasion in modern Qin'an County.
228		Battle of Shiting: A Cao Wei army was lured into an ambush by Eastern Wu in modern Qianshan County and dealt heavy casualties on its retreat.
229		Sun Quan declared himself emperor of Eastern Wu.
232		Cao Zhi died.
234	Autumn	Battle of Wuzhang Plains: Shu Han forces made an orderly retreat from Cao Wei forces on the Wuzhang Plains after Zhuge Liang fell ill and died.
239	22 January	Cao Rui died. He was succeeded by his young adopted son Cao Fang, with Cao Shuang and Sima Yi acting as regents.
244	April	Battle of Xingshi: Shu Han forces stalled a Cao Wei invasion at Mount Xingshi in the modern Changqing National Nature Reserve.
247		Jiang Wei's Northern Expeditions: Cao Wei pushed back an invasion by the Shu Han general Jiang Wei across the Tao River.
248		Eastern Wu forces killed the Vietnamese rebel Lady Triệu.
249		Incident at Gaoping Tombs: Sima Yi took control of the Cao Wei capital Luoyang during Cao Fang and Cao Shuang's absence.
252		Sun Quan died. He was succeeded by his young son Sun Liang, with the general Zhuge Ke acting as regent.
254		Sima Yi's son, the regent Sima Shi, deposed Cao Fang, who was succeeded by Cao Pi's grandson Cao Mao.
255		Ma Jun invented the south-pointing chariot.
258		Sun Liang was deposed by the regent Sun Chen.
258		Sun Liang's brother Sun Xiu was made emperor of Eastern Wu.
260		Coup of Cao Mao: Cao Mao was murdered in a failed attempt to kill the regent Sima Zhao at his residence.
260		Cao Cao's grandson Cao Huan was made emperor of Cao Wei.
263	November	Conquest of Shu by Wei: The Cao Wei general Deng Ai accepted the surrender of the Shu Han emperor Liu Shan outside the capital Chengdu.
263		Liu Hui published a revised version of The Nine Chapters on the Mathematical Art.
264	3 September	Sun Xiu died.
264		Sun Quan's grandson Sun Hao was made emperor of Eastern Wu.
265		Cao Wei instituted the nine-rank system of civil servants.
265	6 September	Sima Zhao died. His eldest son and heir, Sima Yan, inherited his position as regent of Cao Wei and noble title of King of Jin.
265		Pei Xiu introduced the grid reference and the concept of scale to Chinese mapmaking.
266	4 February	Cao Huan, last emperor of Cao Wei, abdicated in favour of Sima Yan.
266	8 February	Sima Yan formally enthroned himself as Emperor of Jin, establishing the Jin dynasty. Sima Yan is posthumously known as Emperor Wu of Jin.
266	20 March	Emperor Wu of Jin established his wife Yang Yan as Empress.
267	4 February	Emperor Wu of Jin established his oldest living son, the developmentally disabled Sima Zhong, as Heir.
280	15 March	Conquest of Wu by Jin: Sun Hao presented himself as a prisoner to the Jin general Wang Jun.
280		Chen Shou compiled the Records of the Three Kingdoms.
290	17 May	Emperor Wu died. He was succeeded by his developmentally disabled son Emperor Hui of Jin, with Yang Jun acting as regent.
291		War of the Eight Princes: Hui's wife Jia Nanfeng invited troops loyal to his brother Sima Wei into the Jin capital Luoyang to imprison the empress dowager Empress Yang Zhi and her relatives.

=== 4th century ===
Year	Date	Event
304		The Xiongnu noble Liu Yuan declared himself prince of Former Zhao.
304		The Di warlord Li Xiong declared himself prince of Cheng Han.
307	8 January	Hui was poisoned, probably by the regent Sima Yue.
307		Hui's brother Emperor Huai of Jin became emperor of the Jin dynasty.
311		Huai was kidnapped from the capital Luoyang by Former Zhao forces.
313		Goguryeo conquered and annexed the Lelang Commandery.
313	14 March	Huai was executed.
313		Huai's nephew Emperor Min of Jin became emperor of the Jin dynasty.
316		Min surrendered to the Former Zhao general Liu Yao during a siege of the Jin capital Chang'an.
317		Emperor Yuan of Jin declared himself prince of Jin, with his capital at Jiankang.
318		Min was executed.
319		The Jie warlord Shi Le declared himself prince of Later Zhao.
320		Zhang Mao issued a general pardon to the people of Former Liang.
322		The first accurate tomb depiction of stirrups appeared.
323	3 January	Yuan died. He was succeeded by his son Emperor Ming of Jin.
324		The rebel Wang Dun died.
325	18 October	Ming died. He was succeeded by his young son Emperor Cheng of Jin.
328		The rebel Su Jun was defeated by the Jin generals Tao Kan and Wen Jiao.
329		The Later Zhao general Shi Hu captured Shanggui in modern Tianshui and killed the Former Zhao emperor Liu Xi and his nobility.
337	23 November	The Xianbei Murong Huang declared himself prince of Former Yan.
342	26 June	Cheng died. He was succeeded by his brother Emperor Kang of Jin.
344	17 November	Kang died. He was succeeded by his infant son Emperor Mu of Jin.
347		The Jin general Huan Wen captured the Cheng Han capital Chengdu.
351		The Jin general and Di chief Fu Jian declared himself Tian Wang of Former Qin.
351		The Later Zhao emperor Shi Zhi and his court were killed by one of his generals on the orders of the warlord Ran Min.
353		Wang Xizhi wrote the Lantingji Xu.
361	10 July	Mu died.
361		Mu's cousin Emperor Ai of Jin became emperor of the Jin dynasty.
365	30 March	Ai died. He was succeeded by his brother Emperor Fei of Jin.
366		Gu Kaizhi became a Jin officer.
369		A Jin army led by Huan was annihilated as it retreated from the Former Yan capital Ye by the general Murong Chui.
370		The Former Yan emperor Murong Wei was captured by the Former Qin prime minister Wang Meng.
372	6 January	Huan deposed Fei in favor of his granduncle Emperor Jianwen of Jin.
372	12 September	Jianwen died. He was succeeded by his young son Emperor Xiaowu of Jin.
376	26 September	Duke Zhang Tianxi of Former Liang surrendered to Former Qin.
383	November	Battle of Fei River: A Jin army defeated a massively larger Former Qin force, inflicting some seven hundred thousand casualties and expanding Jin territory north to the Yellow River.
384		The Xianbei Former Qin general Murong Chui declared himself prince of Later Yan.
384		The Former Qin general Yao Chang declared himself prince of Later Qin.
385		The Xianbei chief and Former Qin vassal Qifu Guoren joined an active rebellion and declared the independence of Western Qin.
386	20 February	Emperor Daowu of Northern Wei declared himself prince of Northern Wei.
386		The Former Qin general Lü Guang declared himself Tian Wang of the majority-Di Later Liang.
394		The Former Qin emperor Fu Chong was killed and his territory annexed by Western Qin forces.
396		Xiaowu was suffocated by one of his concubines. He was succeeded by his young and severely disabled son Emperor An of Jin.
397		Xiongnu rebels established the Northern Liang, with the Han Duan Ye as king.
397		The Xianbei chief Tufa Wugu declared the independence of Southern Liang from Later Liang.
398		Murong Chui's brother Murong De declared himself prince of Southern Yan.
399		Faxian left for India to acquire Buddhist texts.
400		Six commanderies of Northern Liang seceded as Western Liang, under the kingship of the Han Li Gao.

=== 5th century ===
Year	Date	Event
403		Under military pressure from Southern Liang and Northern Liang, the Later Liang emperor Lü Long surrendered his capital Guzang, in modern Wuwei, to the Later Qin emperor Yao Xing.
404		Huiyuan wrote On Why Monks Do Not Bow Down Before Kings, arguing for the independence of Buddhist clergy from the monarchy.
405		Tao Yuanming retired.
407		The Later Yan emperor Murong Xi was beheaded by his adoptive nephew, the Korean people Gao Yun, who became emperor of the successor state of Northern Yan.
407		The Later Qin general Helian Bobo declared himself Tian Wang of the majority-Xiongnu Xia.
410	25 March	The Southern Yan emperor Murong Chao was executed by Jin along with his court and nobility.
414		Western Qin conquered the Southern Liang capital Ledu, in modern Haidong.
417		The Later Qin emperor Yao Hong surrendered to the Jin general Emperor Wu of Liu Song.
419	28 January	An was strangled on Wu's orders and succeeded by his brother Emperor Gong of Jin.
420		Wu deposed Gong, marking the beginning of the Liu Song dynasty.
421		The Western Liang prince Li Xun committed suicide during the siege of his capital Dunhuang by Northern Liang.
431	Summer	The Western Qin prince Qifu Mumo was executed along with his nobility by the Xia emperor Helian Ding.
431		Helian Ding was captured by the khan of Tuyuhun.
436	4 June	The Northern Yan emperor Feng Hong fled the capital Helong in the face of an attack by Northern Wei.
460		Juqu Anzhou, the prince of Northern Liang in exile in Gaochang, was killed with his family by the Rouran Khaganate.
475		Bodhidharma arrived in China.
477		The oldest known painted depiction of a horse collar was made in the Mogao Caves.
479		The Liu Song emperor Emperor Shun of Liu Song was deposed by his general Emperor Gao of Southern Qi.
485		The Northern Wei emperor Emperor Xiaowen of Northern Wei introduced the equal-field system.
496		Change of Xianbei names to Han names: Xianbei names were converted to Han names in Northern Wei.

=== 6th century ===
Year	Date	Event
502		The young Southern Qi emperor Emperor He of Southern Qi was deposed by his general Emperor Wu of Liang.
523		The Songyue Pagoda was built.
534		The Northern Wei emperor Emperor Xiaowu of Northern Wei fled the capital Luoyang to Chang'an at the advance of his general Gao Huan.
534		Gao Huan appointed Emperor Xiaojing of Eastern Wei emperor of Eastern Wei with his capital at Ye.
535-536		Extreme weather events. Snow reportedly falls in August, which caused harvests to be delayed.
543		The Yupian was completed.
550	5 June	The Eastern Wei general Emperor Wenxuan of Northern Qi deposed Xiaojing and established the state of Northern Qi.
557		The Liang general Emperor Wu of Chen deposed the emperor Emperor Jing of Liang, establishing the Chen dynasty.
557	15 February	The Western Wei general Yuwen Hu deposed the emperor Emperor Gong of Western Wei in favor of his own cousin Emperor Xiaomin of Northern Zhou, establishing the successor state of Northern Zhou.
577	4 February	The Northern Qi emperor Gao Heng and his father, the Taishang Huang Gao Wei, were executed with their family by Northern Zhou.
581		The Northern Zhou emperor Emperor Jing of Northern Zhou was forced to abdicate in favor of his regent Emperor Wen of Sui, initiating the Sui dynasty.
582		Compilation began of the Jingdian Shiwen.
589		Yan Zhitui first referred to toilet paper.
589	10 February	Sui forces captured the Chen capital Jiankang and its emperor Chen Shubao.
598		Goguryeo–Sui War: A Sui army of some three hundred thousand, led by the general Yang Liang, invaded Goguryeo.

=== 7th century ===
Year	Date	Event
601		The Qieyun was published.
602		Sui–Former Lý War: Sui conquered and annexed the Early Lý dynasty.
604	13 August	Wen died. He was succeeded by his son Emperor Yang of Sui.
605		The imperial examination was first used as the sole criterion for appointing local officials in Sui.
605		The Zhaozhou Bridge was completed.
607		Japanese missions to Sui China: The Wa emissary Ono no Imoko arrived in Sui.
609		The Grand Canal was completed.
610		Engineers Geng Xun and Yuwen Kai invented an improved water clock.
610		Yang ordered his commanderies to submit maps and gazetteers to the central government.
611		The Four Gates Pagoda was completed.
612		Battle of Salsu: Goguryeo routed a Sui invasion force at the Chongchon River, inflicting some three hundred thousand casualties.
616		Sa'd ibn Abi Waqqas first visited China.
617	18 December	The rebel Emperor Gaozu of Tang, in control of the Sui capital Chang'an, declared Yang Taishang Huang and his grandson Yang You emperor.
618	12 June	Transition from Sui to Tang: Gaozu deposed Yang You.
621	28 May	Battle of Hulao: Tang forces defeated and captured the warlord Dou Jiande at Hulao Pass.
624		Ouyang Xun completed the Yiwen Leiju.
626	2 July	Xuanwu Gate Incident: Gaozu's son Emperor Taizong of Tang assassinated his brothers Li Yuanji and the crown prince Li Jiancheng.
626	4 September	Gaozu retired. Taizong succeeded him.
630		Tang campaign against the Eastern Turks: Tang forces captured the khan of the Eastern Turkic Khaganate in the Yin Mountains.
635		The first Christian missionaries arrived in China.
635		Nestorian monks from Anatolia and the Sasanian Empire built the Daqin Pagoda.
635		Alopen wrote the Jesus Sutras.
635		Emperor Taizong's campaign against Tuyuhun: The Tuyuhun khan Murong Fuyun, in flight from Tang forces and with much of his army destroyed, was killed by his officers.
635		The Book of Liang was published.
636		The Xumi Pagoda was completed.
636		The Book of Chen, Book of Northern Qi, Book of Zhou, and Book of Sui were compiled.
638		Tibetan attack on Songzhou: Tibetan forces raided the city of Songzhou, in modern Songpan County.
640		The Protectorate General to Pacify the West was established.
640		Tang campaign against Karakhoja: Tang defeated and annexed Gaochang.
641		Emperor Taizong's campaign against Xueyantuo: Taizong sent his general Li Shiji to support the restoration of the Eastern Turkic Khaganate under Qilibi Khan against Xueyantuo.
643		Taizong commissioned Yan Liben to paint portraits of his officials at Lingyan Pavilion.
644		Tang campaigns against Karasahr: A Tang army captured Karasahr and installed a friendly king.
645	20 July	First campaign in the Goguryeo–Tang War: Tang forces dispersed a Goguryeo army which had arrived in defense of Ansi City.
646		Bianji compiled the Great Tang Records on the Western Regions.
647		The Protectorate General to Pacify the North was established.
648		The Book of Jin was compiled.
648		Tang campaigns against Karasahr: Tang forces captured the king of Karasahr.
649		The four arts were first written of as skills required of a Chinese scholar-official.
649	19 January	Tang campaign against Kucha: Kucha surrendered to Tang forces.
649	10 July	Taizong died.
649	15 July	Taizong's son Emperor Gaozong of Tang became emperor of the Tang dynasty.
657		Gaozong commissioned the compilation of a materia medica.
657		Battle of Irtysh River: Tang forces ambushed and largely destroyed the army of the Western Turkic Khaganate at the Irtysh River.
659		The History of the Southern Dynasties and the History of the Northern Dynasties were completed.
663		Battle of Baekgang: The allied navies of Silla and the Tang dynasty defeated a combined Baekje restorationist and Japanese force in the lower reaches of the Geum River.
666		The Chinese Buddhist monks Zhiyu and Zhiyou crafted a mechanical south-pointing chariot for the Japanese emperor Emperor Tenji.
668		The Protectorate General to Pacify the East was established.
683	27 December	Gaozong died.
684		The Qianling Mausoleum was completed.
684		Luo Binwang died.
690	16 October	Gaozong's wife Wu Zetian became emperor of the Tang dynasty. She was the only generally recognized female emperor in Chinese history.
692		Tang forces reconquered the Four Garrisons of Anxi from Tibet.
700		The Dunhuang map was created.

=== 8th century ===
Year	Date	Event
704		The Giant Wild Goose Pagoda was rebuilt.
705	22 February	Wu Zetian was forced to abdicate the throne in favor of her son Emperor Zhongzong of Tang.
705	23 February	Zhongzong became emperor of Tang.
709		The Small Wild Goose Pagoda was completed.
710		Liu Zhiji compiled the Shitong.
710		Shangguan Wan'er died.
710	3 July	Zhongzong died after being poisoned, probably by his wife Empress Wei.
710	8 July	Zhongzong's son Emperor Shang of Tang became emperor of Tang, with Wei acting as regent.
710	25 July	A coup led by Gaozong's daughter Princess Taiping and grandson Emperor Xuanzong of Tang killed Wei and deposed Shang in favor of his uncle, Gaozong's son Emperor Ruizong of Tang.
712	8 September	Ruizong abdicated the throne to Xuanzong.
712		The Pear Garden was established.
713		The Kaiyuan Za Bao was first published.
715		First encounter between the Tang dynasty and the Umayyad Arabs. Tang dynasty defeats the Arab occupation force in Fergana Valley, reinstalls Ikhshid on the throne.
717		Arabs attack Transoxiana hoping to capture the Tang dynasty's Four Garrisons of Anxi district, but are routed in the Battle of Aksu.
725		Yi Xing invented a water-powered armillary sphere.
729		Gautama Siddha completed the compilation of the Treatise on Astrology of the Kaiyuan Era.
740		Wu Daozi died.
740		Meng Haoran died.
744		Du Fu and Li Bai first met.
751	July	Battle of Talas: After the defection of their Karluk mercenaries, a Tang force was defeated by a vastly superior Abbasid-Tibetan allied army on the Talas River, probably near modern Talas.
755	16 December	An Lushan Rebellion: The Tang jiedushi An Lushan declared himself emperor of Yan.
755		Zhang Xuan died.
756	Spring	Battle of Yongqiu: Yan forces retreated from their siege of a Tang fortress in Yongqiu, in modern Kaifeng.
756	12 August	The Tang army declared Xuanzong's son Emperor Suzong of Tang emperor at Lingwu.
756	10 September	Xuanzong recognized Suzong as emperor.
757		Battle of Suiyang: Yan forces finally conquered Suiyang, in modern Suiyang District, after a siege that cost the lives of some sixty thousand Yan soldiers and thirty thousand Tang civilians were lost to starvation and cannibalism.
758		Arab and Persian pirates looted and burned the Tang seaport of Guangzhou.
759		Wang Wei died.
760		Lu Yu composed The Classic of Tea.
760		Yangzhou massacre (760): Arab and Persian merchants are killed by Chinese rebels.
762	16 May	Suzong died of a heart attack.
762	18 May	Suzong's son Emperor Daizong of Tang became emperor of the Tang dynasty.
762		Du Huan wrote the Jingxingji.
763		An Lushan Rebellion: The Yan emperor Shi Chaoyi committed suicide in flight from Tang forces.
779	23 May	Daizong died.
779	12 June	Daizong's son Emperor Dezong of Tang became emperor of the Tang dynasty.
781		The Nestorian Stele was composed.
783		Han Gan died.
785		The Tang official Jia Dan began work on a map of Tang and its former colonies.
794		Prince Li Gao ordered the construction of the first Chinese paddle-wheel ships.

=== 9th century ===
Year	Date	Event
801		Du You completed the Tongdian.
805	25 February	Dezong died.
805	28 February	Dezong's son Emperor Shunzong of Tang became emperor of the Tang dynasty.
805	31 August	Shunzong abdicated in favor of his son Emperor Xianzong of Tang.
806		Xianzong launched the first of a series of military campaigns against the provinces.
820	14 February	Xianzong died, possibly after being poisoned by one of his eunuch officers.
820	20 February	Xianzong's son Emperor Muzong of Tang became emperor of the Tang dynasty.
824	25 February	Muzong died.
824	29 February	Muzong's young son Emperor Jingzong of Tang became emperor of the Tang dynasty.
824		Han Yu died.
827	9 January	Jingzong was assassinated.
827	13 January	Jingzong's brother Emperor Wenzong of Tang became emperor of the Tang dynasty.
831		An Uyghur sued the son of a Tang general for failure to repay a debt.
840	10 February	Wenzong died.
840	20 February	Wenzong's brother Emperor Wuzong of Tang became emperor of the Tang dynasty.
843		A large fire consumed four thousand buildings in an eastern neighborhood of the Tang capital Chang'an.
845		Great Anti-Buddhist Persecution: Wuzong abolished Buddhist monasteries as well as establishments of Zoroastrianism and Christianity, which were thought to be Buddhist heresies.
846	22 April	Wuzong died.
846	25 April	Wuzong's uncle, Xianzong's son Emperor Xuānzong of Tang became emperor of the Tang dynasty.
846		Bai Juyi died.
851		The Arab merchant Sulaiman al-Tajir visited Guangzhou.
852		Du Mu died.
853		Duan Chengshi published the Miscellaneous Morsels from Youyang.
858		A flood along the Grand Canal and on the North China Plain killed tens of thousands.
859	7 September	Xuānzong died.
859	13 September	Xuānzong's son Emperor Yizong of Tang became emperor of the Tang dynasty.
863		Duan Chengshi published a work describing the slave trade, ivory trade and ambergris trade in Bobali, probably modern Berbera.
868	11 May	The Diamond Sutra was printed.
873	15 August	Yizong died.
873	16 August	Yizong's son Emperor Xizong of Tang became emperor of the Tang dynasty.
874		Wang Xianzhi launched a rebellion against the Tang government.
879		Guangzhou massacre: The rebel Huang Chao burned and looted Guangzhou and killed as many as two hundred thousand foreigners, mainly Arabs and Persians.
884	13 July	Huang was murdered with his immediate family while in flight from Tang forces.
888	20 April	Xizong died. He was succeeded by his brother Emperor Zhaozong of Tang.

=== 10th century ===
Year	Date	Event
904	22 September	Zhaozong was killed on the orders of the warlord Zhu Wen, then in control of the Tang capital Chang'an.
904	26 September	Zhu Wen appointed Zhaozong's young son Emperor Ai of Tang emperor of the Tang dynasty.
907	27 February	The Khitan chieftain Abaoji became emperor of the Liao dynasty.
907	12 May	Zhu Wen deposed Ai and declared himself emperor of Later Liang. The princes Yang Wo and Wang Jian, who did not recognize Zhu Wen, became de facto independent, as did their states Wu and Former Shu, respectively.
907		Zhu Wen created Qian Liu the prince of Wuyue.
907		Zhu Wen created Ma Yin, the jiedushi of the Wu'an Circuit, prince of Chu.
909	27 April	Zhu Wen created Wang Shenzhi prince of Min.
917		The earliest Chinese reference to Greek fire appeared.
917	5 September	Liu Yan emperor of Southern Han.
919		The flamethrower was first described in China.
923	13 May	Prince Li Cunxu of Jin declared himself emperor of Later Tang.
923	18 November	The Later Liang emperor Zhu Youzhen was killed by one of his generals at the approach of Li Cunxu to his capital Daliang.
924	14 April	Gao Jixing declared himself king of Jingnan.
925	15 December	The Former Shu emperor Wang Zongyan surrendered to the Later Tang army at his capital Chengdu.
926	6 September	Abaoji died.
927	11 December	Abaoji's son Emperor Taizong of Liao became emperor of the Liao dynasty.
934	16 March	Meng Zhixiang, the Later Tang jiedushi of the territory of the defunct Former Shu, declared himself emperor of Later Shu.
936	28 November	Taizong recognized the Shatuo Later Tang general Shi Jingtang emperor of Later Jin in exchange for the promised cession of the Sixteen Prefectures that formed a natural border around the North China Plain.
937	11 January	The Later Tang emperor Li Congke burned himself to death with his family and servants as the joint armies of Liao and Later Jin approached his capital Luoyang.
937	10 November	The Wu emperor Yang Pu was deposed by his general Li Bian, who declared himself emperor of the Wu successor state of Southern Tang.
945	2 October	Min was conquered and annexed by Southern Tang.
947	11 January	The Later Jin emperor Shi Chonggui was deposed and his territory annexed by the Liao dynasty.
947	10 March	The Shatuo Liu Zhiyuan, a jiedushi of the defunct Later Jin, declared himself emperor of Later Han.
947	15 May	Taizong died.
947	16 May	Taizong's nephew Emperor Shizong of Liao, whom he had raised, became emperor of the Liao dynasty.
950		The earliest known depiction of a fire lance and lobbed grenade appeared.
951	2 January	The Later Han emperor Liu Chengyou was killed by one of his officers while attempting to escape the siege of the capital Ye by his general Guo Wei.
951	13 February	Guo Wei declared himself emperor of Later Zhou.
951	7 October	Shizong was murdered by one of his officers.
951	11 October	Shizong's cousin, Taizong's son Emperor Muzong of Liao became emperor of the Liao dynasty.
951		Southern Tang conquered and annexed Chu.
951		Liu Zhiyuan's brother Liu Chong declared himself declared himself emperor of Northern Han.
960		Gu Hongzhong painted the Night Revels of Han Xizai.
960	3 February	Emperor Guo Zongxun of Later Zhou was overthrown by his general Emperor Taizu of Song.
960	4 February	Taizu became emperor of the Song dynasty.
960		Taizu was presented with gunpowder-impregnated fire arrows.
960		The Hundred Family Surnames was composed.
961		The Huqiu Tower was built.
963		The Song dynasty conquered and annexed Jingnan.
965	23 February	The Later Shu emperor Meng Chang surrendered to the Song army at his capital Chengdu.
969	12 March	Muzong was murdered by his servants on a hunting trip.
969	13 March	Shizong's son Emperor Jingzong of Liao became emperor of the Liao dynasty.
971		Southern Han was conquered and annexed by the Song dynasty.
974		Song troops constructed a floating pontoon bridge across the Yangtze River in order to secure supply lines while fighting against the Southern Tang.
976	1 January	Song forces conquered and annexed Southern Tang.
976	14 November	Taizu died.
976	15 November	Taizu's brother Emperor Taizong of Song became emperor of the Song dynasty.
976		The Yuelu Academy was founded.
977		The pagoda of the Longhua Temple was built.
978		The Taiping Guangji was completed.
978		The Wuyue king Qian Chu surrendered his territory to Taizong.
979		The Northern Han emperor Liu Jiyuan surrendered to Song.
981		Battle of Bạch Đằng: A Song naval invasion of the Early Lê dynasty via the Bạch Đằng River was aborted after the land invasion was stalled.
982	13 October	Jingzong died.
982	14 October	Jingzong's young son Emperor Shengzong of Liao became emperor, with his widow Empress Xiao Yanyan acting as regent.
983		The Taiping Yulan was completed.
984		Qiao Weiyo invented the canal pound lock.
986		The Wenyuan Yinghua was completed.
990		Fan Kuan was born.
993	November	First conflict in the Goryeo–Khitan War: Liao forces invaded Goryeo.
997		The Longkan Shoujian was completed.
997	8 May	Taizong died. He was succeeded by his son Emperor Zhenzong.
1000		The Chinese first used coke in place of charcoal for blast furnaces.

=== 11th century ===
Year	Date	Event
1005		Song signed the Chanyuan Treaty, under which it agreed to pay Liao an annual tribute in silk and silver.
1008		The Guangyun was completed.
1010		Second conflict in the Goryeo–Khitan War: Liao captured the Goryeo general Kang Cho and burned the capital Kaesong.
1010		An atlas of China was completed.
1013		Cefu Yuangui was completed.
1018		Third conflict in the Goryeo–Khitan War: Liao invaded Goryeo.
1019	10 March	Battle of Kuju: Goryeo forces decisively defeated a retreating Liao army at Kuju, near modern Kusong.
1022	23 March	Zhenzong died.
1022	24 March	Zhenzong's son Emperor Renzong of Song became emperor of the Song dynasty.
1031	25 June	Shengzong died. He was succeeded by his son Emperor Xingzong of Liao.
1037		The Jiyun was published.
1038	10 November	The Tangut chieftain Emperor Jingzong of Western Xia declared himself emperor of Western Xia.
1041		Bi Sheng invented movable type.
1043		Ouyang Xiu and the vice chancellor Fan Zhongyan drafted the Qingli Reforms in Song.
1044		The Wujing Zongyao was completed.
1045		The Lingxiao Pagoda was completed.
1048	19 January	Jingzong died. He was succeeded by his infant son Emperor Yizong of Western Xia.
1049		The Iron Pagoda was completed.
1055		The Liaodi Pagoda was completed.
1055	28 August	Xingzong died. He was succeeded by his son Emperor Daozong of Liao.
1056		The Pagoda of Fogong Temple was completed.
1060		Ouyang Xiu completed the New Book of Tang.
1063	30 April	Renzong died.
1063	1 May	Emperor Yingzong of Song became emperor of the Song dynasty.
1063		The Pizhi Pagoda was completed.
1067		Yizong died. He was succeeded by his young son Emperor Huizong of Western Xia.
1067	25 January	Yingzong died. He was succeeded by his son Emperor Shenzong of Song.
1068		The dry dock was first used in China.
1069		The Song chancellor Wang Anshi ordered an extensive government reform including the introduction of the baojia system of community-based law enforcement.
1070		The Song ambassador Su Song published the Bencao Tujing.
1072		Guo Xi painted Early Spring.
1075		The Song diplomat Shen Kuo used court archives to reject Daozong's territorial claims.
1075		A proto-Bessemer process was first observed in Cizhou.
1076		Wang resigned.
1077		Su was sent on a mission to Liao.
1080		Shen was appointed to defend Yan'an.
1081		A Song army was dealt some sixty thousand casualties defending Yan'an against an attempted invasion of Song by Western Xia forces.
1081		Su published a 200-volume work on Song-Liao relations.
1084		Sima Guang completed the Zizhi Tongjian.
1084		Li Qingzhao was born.
1085	1 April	Shenzong died. He was succeeded by his young son Emperor Zhezong, with his widow Empress Xiang acting as regent.
1085		Xiang ousted the court faction affiliated with Wang's reforms at Sima's urging.
1086		Huizong died.
1086		Huizong's son Emperor Chongzong of Western Xia became emperor of Western Xia.
1088		Shen published the Dream Pool Essays.
1090		The earliest known description of the mechanical belt appeared.
1094		Su completed a clock tower in Kaifeng.
1094		The Dongpo Academy was established on Hainan.
1100	23 February	Zhezong died. He was succeeded by his younger brother Emperor Huizong of Song.

=== 12th century ===
Year	Date	Event
1101	12 February	Daozong was murdered. He was succeeded by his grandson Emperor Tianzuo of Liao.
1103		The Yingzao Fashi was published.
1107		Mi Fu died.
1111		The Donglin Academy was founded.
1115	28 January	The Wanyan chieftain Emperor Taizu of Jin declared himself emperor of the Jin dynasty.
1115	August	Taizu conquered the Liao city of Huanglongfu.
1119		Zhu Yu published the Pingzhou Table Talks.
1120		The pagoda of Tianning Temple was completed.
1123	19 September	Taizu died.
1123	27 September	Taizu's brother Emperor Taizong of Jin became emperor of the Jin dynasty.
1124		The Liao general Yelü Dashi established the Khitan Qara Khitai in the Liao northwest.
1125	26 March	Jin dynasty forces captured Tianzuo.
1125	November	Jin–Song Wars: The Jin army invaded Song.
1126	18 January	Huizong abdicated in favor of his son Emperor Qinzong.
1126	19 January	Emperor Qinzong became emperor of the Song dynasty.
1127	9 January	Jingkang Incident: The Song capital Kaifeng fell to a Jin siege. Huizong and Qinzong were captured with much of their court.
1127	12 June	Huizong's son Emperor Gaozong of Song became emperor of the Song dynasty at Lin'an City.
1132		Song established a standing navy headquartered at Dinghai in modern Dinghai District.
1132		A fire destroyed some thirteen thousand homes in the Song capital Lin'an City.
1135		The Song general Yue Fei defeated the bandit Yang Yao at Dongting Lake.
1135	9 February	Taizong died.
1135	10 February	Emperor Xizong of Jin became emperor of the Jin dynasty.
1139		Chongzong died.
1139		Chongzong's son Emperor Renzong of Western Xia became emperor of Western Xia.
1141		Song signed the Treaty of Shaoxing, under which it relinquished all claims to its former territories north of the Huai River and agreed to pay Jin an annual tribute in silk and silver.
1142	27 January	Yue was executed on false charges of treason spurred by the Song chancellor Qin Hui.
1150	9 January	Xizong was murdered in a coup by Wanyan Liang, who succeeded him as emperor of Jin.
1153		The Jin capital was moved from Huining Prefecture to Zhongdu.
1157		The Jin capital was moved to Kaifeng.
1161	27 October	Wanyan Liang's cousin Emperor Shizong of Jin was declared emperor of Jin in the capital Kaifeng.
1161	16 November	Battle of Tangdao: The Jin navy suffered heavy losses in an attempted invasion of Song near the Shandong Peninsula.
1161	27 November	Battle of Caishi: Jin forces suffered as many as four thousand casualties at the hands of the Song dynasty in a naval battle which stalled their invasion across the Yangtze.
1161	15 December	Wanyan Liang was assassinated by one of his officers near the Yangtze battlefront.
1161		The Yunjing was compiled.
1162	24 July	Gaozong abdicated in favor of Emperor Xiaozong of Song.
1162		The Beisi Pagoda was completed.
1164		Song and Jin concluded the Treaty of Longxing.
1165		The Liuhe Pagoda was completed.
1179		Zhu Xi rebuilt the White Deer Grotto Academy.
1189	20 January	Shizong died. He was succeeded by his grandson Emperor Zhangzong of Jin.
1189	18 February	Xiaozong abdicated in favor of his son Emperor Guangzong of Song.
1189		The Chengling Pagoda was built.
1193		Renzong died.
1193		Renzong's son Emperor Huanzong of Western Xia became emperor of Western Xia.
1194	24 July	Guangzong was forced to abdicate in favor of his son Emperor Ningzong.

=== 13th century ===
Year	Date	Event
1206		Huanzong was overthrown in a coup.
1206		Emperor Xiangzong of Western Xia became emperor of Western Xia.
1208	29 December	Zhangzong died. He was succeeded by his brother Wanyan Yongji.
1211		Emperor Shenzong of Western Xia deposed and replaced Xiangzong as emperor of Western Xia.
1211	August	Battle of Yehuling: The army of the Mongol Empire captured or killed over four hundred thousand Jin soldiers defending an important mountain pass at Zhangjiakou.
1213	11 September	Wanyan Yongji was assassinated.
1213	22 September	Emperor Xuanzong of Jin became emperor of the Jin dynasty.
1214		The Jin dynasty signed a treaty under which it became a vassal state paying tribute to the Mongol Empire.
1215	1 June	Battle of Zhongdu: Mongol forces breached the walls of Zhongdu and massacred its inhabitants.
1217		Jin-Song Wars: The Jin dynasty attacked the Song dynasty and were defeated on their first campaign but on their second campaign later in the year captured Xihezhou.
1223		Shenzong abdicated in favor of his son Emperor Xianzong of Western Xia.
1224	14 January	Xuanzong died.
1224	15 January	Xuanzong's son Emperor Aizong of Jin became emperor of the Jin dynasty.
1224	17 September	Ningzong died. He was succeeded by Emperor Lizong.
1226		Xianzong died.
1226		Emperor Mozhu of Western Xia became emperor of Western Xia.
1227	18 August	The Mongol khagan Genghis Khan died.
1227		Mozhu surrendered to the Mongol Empire during the siege of the Western Xia capital Zhongxing.
1233	26 February	Siege of Kaifeng (1232): The Jin general in charge of the defense of the capital Kaifeng surrendered to the besieging Mongol army. Aizong had fled during the siege; his family members still in the city were executed.
1234	9 February	Siege of Caizhou: Aizong passed the throne to his general Emperor Mo of Jin and hanged himself in the face of a Mongol siege of Caizhou. The Mongols breached the city.
1234	10 February	Siege of Caizhou: Mo died fighting the Mongols at Caizhou.
1247		Qin Jiushao wrote the Mathematical Treatise in Nine Sections.
1259	11 August	The Mongol khagan Möngke Khan died during a siege of Diaoyu Fortress.
1260		Toluid Civil War: Möngke's brother Ariq Böke declared himself khagan of the Mongol Empire.
1260	5 May	Toluid Civil War: Kublai Khan, brother to Möngke and to Ariq Böke, was crowned khagan of the Mongol Empire.
1260		Kublai appointed the Sakya lama Drogön Chögyal Phagpa Imperial Preceptor.
1261		Yang Hui first drew Pascal's triangle.
1264	16 November	Lizong died. He was succeeded by his nephew Emperor Duzong.
1265		Mongol conquest of the Song dynasty: The Mongol Empire invaded Song.
1267		Battle of Xiangyang: Kublai ordered his general Aju to take Xiangyang.
1270		Sambyeolcho Rebellion: The Sambyeolcho rebelled against Wonjong of Goryeo, the Mongol-allied king of Goryeo.
1271		Marco Polo left Venice.
1271		Kublai declared himself emperor of the Yuan dynasty.
1273	14 March	Battle of Xiangyang: The Yuan army breached and captured Xiangyang.
1274	12 August	Duzong died. He was succeeded by his young son Emperor Gong of Song.
1274	5 October	Mongol invasions of Japan: A Yuan fleet landed at Tsushima Island.
1275		The Yuan general Bayan of the Baarin defeated a Song army led by the chancellor Jia Sidao.
1276	4 February	Gong and his great-aunt the grand empress dowager Xie Daoqing surrendered themselves to the Yuan army besieging the Song capital Lin'an City.
1276	14 June	Gong's older brother, the young Emperor Duanzong, was crowned emperor of the Song dynasty at Fuzhou.
1276		Qian Xuan retired.
1276		The Gaocheng Astronomical Observatory was built.
1278		The Song general Wen Tianxiang was captured by Yuan forces.
1278	8 May	Duanzong died.
1278	10 May	Duanzong's younger brother Emperor Bing of Song became emperor of the Song dynasty.
1279	19 March	Battle of Yamen: A Yuan fleet destroyed a vastly superior Song force near Yamen. The Song chancellor Lu Xiufu drowned himself with Bing.
1287		The Zhongdu-born Rabban Bar Sauma left for Europe as an ambassador of Arghun, the khan of the Ilkhanate.
1287	December	Battle of Pagan: Yuan forces captured the Pagan capital Bagan.
1288		Battle of Bạch Đằng: Đại Việt decisively defeated a numerically superior Yuan invasion fleet on the Bạch Đằng River.
1289		Europeans in Medieval China: Franciscan friars first conducted missionary work in China.
1294	18 February	Kublai died.
1294	10 May	Kublai's grandson Temür Khan became emperor of the Yuan dynasty.
1293		John of Montecorvino arrives in China and is appointed Archbishop of Khanbaliq (Beijing).
1298		Wang Zhen invented movable wooden type.

=== 14th century ===
Year	Date	Event
1307	10 February	Temür died.
1307	21 June	Temür's nephew Külüg Khan became emperor of the Yuan dynasty.
1311	27 January	Külüg died.
1311	7 April	Külüg's younger brother Ayurbarwada Buyantu Khan became emperor of the Yuan dynasty.
1316		Guo Shoujing died.
1320	1 March	Ayurbarwada died.
1320	19 April	Ayurbarwada's son Gegeen Khan became emperor of the Yuan dynasty.
1323	4 September	Gegeen was assassinated by the Asud in a coup led by the Khongirad grand censor Tegshi.
1323	4 October	Yesün Temür became emperor of the Yuan dynasty.
1324		Zhongyuan Yinyun was published.
1328	15 August	Yesün Temür died.
1328	October	Yesün Temür's son Ragibagh Khan was appointed emperor of the Yuan dynasty in Shangdu.
1328	16 October	The Yuan general El Temür crowned Jayaatu Khan Tugh Temür emperor in Khanbaliq.
1328	14 November	Forces loyal to El Temür captured Shangdu and may have executed Ragibagh.
1329	27 February	Tugh Temür's brother Khutughtu Khan Kusala crowned himself emperor of the Yuan dynasty in Karakorum with the support of the Chagatai Khanate.
1329	3 April	Tugh Temür abdicated in Khutughtu's favor.
1329	30 August	Khutughtu died, probably after being poisoned by Tugh Temür.
1329	8 September	Tugh Temür was crowned emperor of the Yuan dynasty.
1330		The Pagoda of Bailin Temple was completed.
1332	2 September	Tugh Temür died.
1332	23 October	El Temür crowned Khutughtu's young son Rinchinbal Khan emperor of the Yuan dynasty.
1332	14 December	Rinchinbal died.
1333	19 July	Rinchinbal's older brother Toghon Temür became emperor of the Yuan dynasty.
1334		Wang Dayuan travelled to North Africa.
1342		Papal missionary Giovanni de Marignolli leaves Europe for Khanbaliq (Beijing).
1351		Red Turban Rebellion: The millenarian White Lotus sect first plotted armed rebellion against the Yuan dynasty.
1352		Red Turban Rebellion: The Hongwu Emperor joined the rebellion.
1356		Red Turban Rebellion: The rebel army captured Nanjing.
1363	30 August	Battle of Lake Poyang: A Red Turban fleet commanded by the Hongwu Emperor met a fleet led by Chen Youliang, the self-proclaimed king of the rebel state of Han, on Poyang Lake.
1363	4 October	Battle of Lake Poyang: The Han navy was destroyed. Chen Youliang was killed.
1368	20 January	Red Turban Rebellion: The Hongwu Emperor declared himself emperor of the Ming dynasty.
1368	September	Toghon Temür fled Khanbaliq for Shangdu in the face of a Ming advance.
1371		Ming implemented the haijin, a ban on all private maritime commerce.
1373		The Hongwu Emperor abolished the imperial examination in favor of a recommendation system for appointing local Ming officials.
1373		The Temple of the Six Banyan Trees was rebuilt.
1375	16 May	Liu Bowen died.
1380		The Hongwu Emperor abolished the office of chancellor and took over direct control of the Three Departments and Six Ministries.
1382	6 January	Ming conquest of Yunnan: Basalawarmi, the prince of Liang and a Yuan loyalist, committed suicide during a massive Ming invasion of Yunnan.
1382		The Jinyiwei was established and given supreme judicial authority and complete autonomy in making arrests and issuing punishments.
1384		The Hongwu Emperor reinstituted the imperial examination.
1397		A legal code based on the Tang Code was implemented in Ming.
1398	24 June	The Hongwu Emperor died.
1398	30 June	The Hongwu Emperor's young grandson the Jianwen Emperor became emperor of the Ming dynasty.

=== 15th century ===
Year	Date	Event
1402	13 July	Jingnan Campaign: Forces loyal to the Jianwen Emperor's uncle the Yongle Emperor entered the capital Nanjing and burned the imperial palace with the Jianwen Emperor inside.
1405	11 July	Treasure voyages: The Yongle Emperor ordered a fleet of Chinese treasure ships under the command of the admiral Zheng He to reestablish tributary relationships with states in the South China Sea and Indian Ocean.
1405		The Ming Xiaoling Mausoleum was completed.
1406		Construction began on the Forbidden City and Beijing city fortifications.
1407	10 April	The Kagyu karmapa Deshin Shekpa, 5th Karmapa Lama arrived at the Ming capital Nanjing.
1407	16 June	Ming–Hồ War: Ming forces captured the Hồ king Hồ Hán Thương.
1408		The Yongle Encyclopedia was completed.
1415		Restoration work on the Grand Canal was completed.
1420		Construction of the Forbidden City and Beijing city fortifications was completed. The Yongle Emperor moved the Ming capital from Nanjing to Beijing.
1420		The Ming tombs were built.
1424	12 August	The Yongle Emperor died.
1424	7 September	The Yongle Emperor's son the Hongxi Emperor became emperor of the Ming dynasty.
1425	29 May	The Hongxi Emperor died, probably from a heart attack.
1425	27 June	The Hongxi Emperor's son the Xuande Emperor became emperor of the Ming dynasty.
1427		Shen Zhou was born.
1431		Ming recognized the Lê dynasty as a tributary state.
1435	31 January	The Xuande Emperor died.
1435	7 February	The Xuande Emperor's son the Zhengtong Emperor became emperor of the Ming dynasty.
1443		The Zhihua Temple was built.
1446		The Precious Belt Bridge was rebuilt.
1449	1 September	Tumu Crisis: A Four Oirat force defeated a vastly superior Ming army at Tumu in modern Huailai County and captured the Zhengtong Emperor.
1449	22 September	The Zhengtong Emperor's brother the Jingtai Emperor became emperor of the Ming dynasty.
1457	11 February	The Zhengtong Emperor overthrew the Jingtai Emperor in a coup and took power as the Tianshun Emperor.
1461	7 August	Rebellion of Cao Qin: An uprising of Mongol soldiers in the Ming capital Beijing, led by the general Cao Qin, was crushed.
1464	23 February	The Zhengtong Emperor died.
1464	28 February	The Zhengtong Emperor's son the Chenghua Emperor became emperor of the Ming dynasty.
1464		The Miao and Yao peoples rebelled against Ming authority in Guangxi.
1473		The Zhenjue Temple was completed.
1487	9 September	The Chenghua Emperor died.
1487	22 September	The Chenghua Emperor's son the Hongzhi Emperor became emperor of the Ming dynasty.
1488		The Joseon official Choe Bu suffered a shipwreck in Zhejiang.

=== 16th century ===
Year	Date	Event
1505	8 June	The Hongzhi Emperor died.
1505	19 June	The Hongzhi Emperor's son the Zhengde Emperor became emperor of the Ming dynasty.
1510	12 May	Prince of Anhua rebellion: Ming tax collectors were murdered on the orders of Zhu Zhifan, the prince of Anhua in modern Shaanxi.
1511	15 August	Capture of Malacca: A Portuguese invasion force conquered the Malacca Sultanate, the news reached the Ming.
1513		The Portuguese explorer Jorge Álvares arrived on Lintin Island in the Pearl River Delta.
1516		The Portuguese explorer Rafael Perestrello arrived in Guangzhou.
1517		The Portuguese ambassadors Fernão Pires de Andrade and Tomé Pires arrived in Guangzhou.
1519	10 July	Prince of Ning rebellion: The prince of Ning Zhu Chenhao declared that the Zhengde Emperor was an usurper and led an expedition toward Nanjing.
1521	20 April	The Zhengde Emperor died.
1521	27 May	The Zhengde Emperor's cousin, the Chenghua Emperor's grandson the Jiajing Emperor, became emperor of the Ming dynasty.
1521		The Jiajing Emperor expelled the Portuguese embassy.
1529		Wang Yangming died.
1530		An improved sand-driven mechanical clock was invented.
1549		Portuguese trade ships first stopped at Shangchuan Island.
1550		The Mongol chieftain Altan Khan burned and looted the Ming capital Beijing and its suburbs.
1553		The Ming capital Beijing was expanded to the south, increasing its size from 10 to 12 square kilometres (4 to 4 1/2 square miles).
1554		The Luso-Chinese agreement (1554) for Macau is made between the Kingdom of Portugal and the Ming dynasty.
1556	23 January	1556 Shaanxi earthquake: An earthquake in and around modern Shaanxi killed some eight hundred thousand people.
1557		The Kingdom of Portugal established a permanent settlement in Macau.
1558		Ming forces led by Qi Jiguang dealt the wokou a defeat at Cengang.
1567	23 January	The Jiajing Emperor died.
1567	4 February	The Jiajing Emperor's son the Longqing Emperor became emperor of the Ming dynasty.
1567		The Ming haijin (ban on private maritime commerce) was repealed.
1572	5 July	The Longqing Emperor died.
1572	19 July	The Longqing Emperor's son the Wanli Emperor became emperor of the Ming dynasty.
1573		Spain established a permanent base at Manila.
1574		Qin Liangyu was born.
1576		The Pagoda of Cishou Temple was built.
1577		The Wanshou Temple was built.
1580		The grand secretary Zhang Juzheng instituted the single whip law, under which all monetary and labor obligations to the central government were consolidated into a single silver payment.
1582		Jesuit China missions: The Jesuit missionary Matteo Ricci arrived in Macau.
1582		Private newspapers were first published in Beijing.
1584		The earliest known depiction of the sailing carriage appeared.
1587		Li Shizhen published the Compendium of Materia Medica.
1590		Wu Cheng'en wrote Journey to the West.
1592		Japanese invasions of Korea: Some two hundred thousand Japanese troops invaded Joseon.
1593	8 January	Siege of Pyongyang: A combined Ming-Joseon force drove the Japanese army from Pyongyang.
1597	23 December	Siege of Ulsan: A combined Ming-Joseon force arrived at the Japanese-controlled Ulsan Japanese Castle.
1598	29 September	Battle of Sacheon: A Japanese army under siege at Sacheon drove off a numerically superior Ming-Joseon force after the accidental explosion of the Ming powder cache.
1598	16 December	Battle of Noryang: The allied navies of Ming and Joseon dealt heavy damage to a Japanese fleet attempting to break their blockade of Suncheon Japanese Castle.
1598		The Peony Pavilion was first performed at the Pavilion of Prince Teng.

=== 17th century ===
Year	Date	Event
1602		The Dutch East India Company (VOC) began shipping Chinese ceramics to Europe.
1604		The grand secretary Gu Xiancheng reopened the Donglin Academy in Wuxi, establishing the Donglin movement.
1607		Euclid's Elements was first translated into Chinese.
1609		Sancai Tuhui was published.
1610		Jin Ping Mei was published.
1615		The Zihui was compiled.
1616	17 February	Nurhaci declared himself khan of the later Jin dynasty.
1616		All foreign Jesuits were expelled from the Ming imperial court and astronomy bureau.
1619	18 April	Battle of Sarhu: The last of four Ming armies was destroyed during a retreat from a punitive expedition against Nurhaci and the later Jin. Its commander Li Rubai committed suicide
1619		Wang Fuzhi was born.
1620	18 August	The Wanli Emperor died.
1620	28 August	The Wanli Emperor's son the Taichang Emperor became emperor of the Ming dynasty.
1620	26 September	The Taichang Emperor died.
1620	1 October	The Taichang Emperor's young son the Tianqi Emperor became emperor of the Ming dynasty.
1624		The VOC established the state of Dutch Formosa.
1626		Johann Adam Schall von Bell wrote the first Chinese language treatise on the telescope.
1626		The Jesuit Nicolas Trigault invented the first system for the romanization of Chinese.
1626		Battle of Ningyuan: A Ming force defended Xingcheng against a numerically superior later Jin army. Nurhaci suffered fatal wounds.
1627	January	First Manchu invasion of Korea: Nurhaci's son Hong Taiji, the khan of the later Jin dynasty, invaded Joseon.
1627	30 September	The Tianqi Emperor died.
1627	2 October	The Tianqi Emperor's younger brother the Chongzhen Emperor became emperor of the Ming dynasty.
1627	13 December	The eunuch Wei Zhongxian committed suicide on hearing that the Jinyiwei had issued a warrant for his arrest.
1627		The Zhengzitong was published.
1627		The Polish Jesuit Michał Boym first introduced the heliocentric model of the Solar System into Chinese astronomy.
1632		The later Jin dynasty conquered Inner Mongolia.
1634		The Chongzhen Emperor acquired the telescope of the late Johann Schreck.
1635		Liu Tong wrote a preface to the Dijing Jingwulue.
1637	30 January	Second Manchu invasion of Korea: The Joseon king Injo of Joseon recognized Hong Taiji's Qing dynasty as the legitimate rulers of China.
1637		Song Yingxing published the Tiangong Kaiwu.
1638		The Peking Gazette first used moveable type.
1639		Xu Guangqi published a treatise on agriculture.
1639		Chen Hongshou arrived in Beijing.
1641	8 March	Xu Xiake died.
1642		1642 Yellow River flood: The Ming governor of Kaifeng destroyed the levees holding back the Yellow River in order to break the siege of the peasant army of Li Zicheng. The resulting flood destroyed Kaifeng and killed some three hundred thousand people.
1642		A Han army was made the last of the Qing Eight Banners.
1643	21 September	Hong Taiji died.
1643	8 October	Hong Taiji's young son the Shunzhi Emperor became emperor of the Qing dynasty.
1644	25 April	The Chongzhen Emperor hanged himself from the Zuihuai as the army of Li Zicheng's Shun dynasty breached the walls of the Ming capital Beijing.
1644	27 May	Battle of Shanhai Pass: A Shun army was dealt a heavy defeat by the Qing and the former Ming general Wu Sangui at Shanhai Pass.
1644	4 June	Li Zicheng fled Beijing.
1644	8 November	Shunzhi Emperor enthroned in Beijing.
1645	20 May	Yangzhou Massacre: The Qing Dynasty slaughter the inhabitants of Yangzhou city in 6 days according to the contemporary account given by Wang Xiuchu. Xiuchu’s entire account spans 10 days and puts the death toll at 800,000 although Lynn A. Struve conjectures that the city’s population was hardly likely to have been more than 300,000.
1653	January	The 5th Dalai Lama, the Dalai Lama of Tibet, visited the Qing capital Beijing.
1659		Jesuits Martino Martini and Ferdinand Verbiest arrived in China.
1661	5 February	The Shunzhi Emperor died. He was succeeded by his young son the Kangxi Emperor, with the Four Regents of the Kangxi Emperor acting as regents.
1661	14 June	The Southern Ming admiral Koxinga declared the establishment of the Kingdom of Tungning on Taiwan.
1662	1 February	Siege of Fort Zeelandia: The VOC surrendered Fort Zeelandia on Taiwan to Koxinga.
1664		Schall von Bell was imprisoned.
1673		Revolt of the Three Feudatories: Wu rebelled against the Qing dynasty on the pretext of seeking to restore the Ming.
1682		The Belgian Jesuit Antoine Thomas arrived in China.
1683		Battle of Penghu: A Qing fleet destroyed the Tungning navy at Penghu. The king of Tungning Zheng Keshuang surrendered to the Qing.
1684		The first of the Qing Thirteen Factories, neighborhoods where foreigners were allowed to live and trade, were established outside Guangzhou.
1689	27 August	The Qing dynasty signed the Treaty of Nerchinsk with Russia, under which the two countries mutually agreed to a border at the Stanovoy Range.
1690		Yun Shouping died.
1698		The Lugou Bridge was reconstructed.

=== 18th century ===
Year	Date	Event
1705	4 December	The papal legate Charles-Thomas Maillard De Tournon arrived in the Qing capital Beijing.
1711		The East India Company (EIC) established a trading post in Guangzhou.
1711		The Peiwen Yunfu was completed.
1715	19 March	Chinese Rites controversy: The pope Pope Clement XI issued a papal bull forbidding veneration of the dead and worship of Confucius among Chinese converts to Catholicism.
1716		The Kangxi Dictionary was published.
1720		Chinese expedition to Tibet: A Qing expedition expelled the invading forces of the Dzungar Khanate from Tibet.
1721		Chinese Rites controversy: The Kangxi Emperor banned Christian missions in China.
1722	20 December	The Kangxi Emperor died.
1722	27 December	The Kangxi Emperor's son the Yongzheng Emperor became emperor of the Qing dynasty.
1725		The Complete Classics Collection of Ancient China was completed.
1729		Opium criminalized in China.
1732		Jiang Tingxi died.
1735	8 October	The Yongzheng Emperor died. He was succeeded by his son the Qianlong emperor.
1750		The French Jesuit Jean Joseph Marie Amiot was sent to China.
1755		Ten Great Campaigns: The khan of the Dzungar Khanate surrendered to invading Qing forces.
1755		The Puning Temple was built to commemorate the defeat of the Dzungar Khanate.
1760		The Canton System was established, under which the Chinese merchants operating in the Thirteen Factories were organized into a guild, the Cohong, and given an official monopoly.
1771		The Putuo Zongcheng Temple was completed.
1774		The Wenjin Chamber was built.
1780		A pagoda was built at Fragrant Hills.
1782		The Complete Library of the Four Treasuries was completed.
1791		Dream of the Red Chamber was published.
1793	14 September	Macartney Embassy The British ambassador George Macartney, 1st Earl Macartney was introduced to the Qianlong Emperor.
1796	9 February	The Qianlong Emperor abdicated in favor of his son the Jiaqing Emperor.
1796		White Lotus Rebellion: White Lotus began an armed rebellion against the Qing dynasty.

=== 19th century ===
Year	Date	Event
1807		Protestant missions in China 1807–1953: The Protestant missionary Robert Morrison arrived in China.
1820	2 September	The Jiaqing Emperor died.
1820	3 October	The Jiaqing Emperor's son the Daoguang Emperor became emperor of the Qing dynasty.
1823		The Bible was first published in Chinese.
1839	3 June	Destruction of opium at Humen: The Qing Imperial Commissioner Lin Zexu ordered the destruction of roughly a thousand tons of opium seized from EIC merchants in Humen.
1842	29 August	First Opium War: The Qing dynasty and the United Kingdom signed the Treaty of Nanking, under which the former agreed to end the monopoly of the Cohong, pay reparations for the war and the destruction of opium, and cede Hong Kong Island in perpetuity.
1844		Wei Yuan published the Illustrated Treatise on the Maritime Kingdoms.
1844	3 July	The Qing dynasty and the United States signed the Treaty of Wanghia, according to which the United States was granted most favoured nation (MFN) status and extraterritoriality was granted to its citizens resident in China.
1850	25 February	The Daoguang Emperor died.
1850	9 March	The Daoguang Emperor's son the Xianfeng Emperor became emperor of the Qing dynasty.
1851	11 January	Jintian Uprising: The followers of Hong Xiuquan, who believed him to be the younger brother of Jesus, announced their rebellion against the Qing dynasty and the establishment of the Taiping Heavenly Kingdom in modern Guiping.
1855		Third plague pandemic: A plague pandemic began in Yunnan which would kill hundreds of thousands in China and millions worldwide.
1855		Punti-Hakka Clan Wars: An ethnic conflict began in Guangdong between the Punti and Hakka peoples which would claim roughly a million lives.
1856	23 October	Second Opium War: The British navy began a bombardment of Guangzhou.
1858	28 May	The Qing dynasty signed the Treaty of Aigun, ceding to Russia the land north of the Amur River.
1858	June	Second Opium War: The Qing dynasty signed the Treaty of Tientsin, under which foreigners were granted greater freedom of movement within China and France and the United Kingdom were promised war reparations.
1858	18 November	Battle of Sanhe: A Taiping army encircled and destroyed a much smaller Qing force in Anhui.
1860	18 October	Second Opium War: British and French forces looted and burned down the Old Summer Palace in the Qing capital Beijing.
1860	24 October	The Qing prince Prince Gong signed the Convention of Peking, ratifying the Treaty of Tientsin and ceding the Kowloon Peninsula in perpetuity to the United Kingdom.
1861		Gong established the Zongli Yamen to temporarily supervise the conduct of foreign affairs throughout the Qing government.
1861	22 August	The Xianfeng Emperor died.
1861	11 November	The Xianfeng Emperor's young son the Tongzhi Emperor became emperor of the Qing dynasty.
1862		Dungan Revolt: A disordered uprising began among the Hui people living on the west bank of the Yellow River.
1862		The Tongwen Guan school of European languages was established.
1864	May	The Ever Victorious Army of the Qing dynasty was disbanded.
1868	22 August	Yangzhou riot: Scholar-officials resident in Yangzhou instigated a riot in which the headquarters of the British missionary society OMF International were attacked and burned.
1868		Nian Rebellion: The last of the rebel armies was destroyed.
1870	June	Tianjin massacre: A riot took place in Tianjin in which some sixty people, including foreigners and Chinese Christians, were killed.
1871		Li Hongzhang was appointed Viceroy of Zhili.
1873		Panthay Rebellion: The last surviving Panthay rebels were defeated by the Qing dynasty in Tengchong.
1875	12 January	The Tongzhi Emperor died.
1875	21 February	Margary Affair: The British diplomat Augustus Raymond Margary was murdered with his retinue in Tengchong.
1875	25 February	The young Guangxu Emperor became emperor of the Qing dynasty, with the empress dowagers Empress Dowager Ci'an and Empress Dowager Cixi acting as regents.
1876	21 August	The Qing dynasty and the United Kingdom signed the Chefoo Convention, under which Qing promised to punish those responsible for Margary's murder and repeal the likin.
1884	23 August	Battle of Fuzhou: A French fleet destroyed the Qing Fujian Fleet at the mouth of the Min River.
1887	September	The Yellow River flood kills up to 2 million people and makes an additional 2 million homeless. At the time, it was the deadliest natural disaster ever recorded.
1891		Foreign businessmen established the Shanghai Sharebrokers' Association in Shanghai.
1894	1 August	First Sino-Japanese War: War was officially declared between Japan and the Qing dynasty.
1895	17 April	First Sino-Japanese War: The Qing dynasty signed the Treaty of Shimonoseki, under which it recognized the independence of Joseon, granted Japan MFN status and ceded to it Penghu, Taiwan and the Liaodong Peninsula.
1898	11 June	Hundred Days' Reform: The Guangxu Emperor instituted reforms including radical changes in the imperial examination and the elimination of sinecures.
1898	21 September	The Guangxu Emperor was removed from the imperial palace in a coup organized by Cixi and Ronglu, the Viceroy of Zhili.
1900	21 June	Boxer Rebellion: Cixi responded to anti-foreign unrest by issuing the Imperial Decree of declaration of war against foreign powers in the Guangxu Emperor's name.

=== 20th century ===
Year	Date	Event
1901	7 September	Boxer Rebellion: The Qing dynasty and Eight-Nation Alliance signed the Boxer Protocol, under which the Alliance was granted war reparations and the right to station troops in the capital Beijing.
1908	14 November	The Guangxu Emperor died of arsenic poisoning.
1908	2 December	The Guangxu Emperor's young nephew Puyi became emperor of the Qing dynasty.
1911	27 April	Second Guangzhou Uprising
1911	10 October	Wuchang Uprising: New Army soldiers staged a mutiny in Wuchang District and occupied the residence of the Viceroy of Huguang.
1911	29 December	1911 Chinese provisional presidential election: Sun Yat-sen was elected president of the Provisional Government of the Republic of China, with a majority of sixteen of the seventeen provincial representatives of the Tongmenghui in Nanjing.
1912	1 January	Xinhai Revolution: Sun Yat-sen was inaugurated president of the Provisional Government of the Republic of China.
1912	12 February	Xinhai Revolution: Puyi's regent, the empress dowager Empress Dowager Longyu, signed an edict under which Puyi would retain his imperial title but all power would pass to the Provisional Government of the Republic of China.
1912	10 March	Sun Yat-sen resigned in favor of Yuan Shikai.
1912	25 August	The Tongmenghui and several smaller revolutionary parties merged to form the Kuomintang (KMT).
1912	December	1912 Chinese National Assembly election: An election to the National Assembly under the Provisional Constitution of the Republic of China began which would produce pluralities for the KMT in the House and Senate.
1913	20 March	Assassination of Song Jiaoren: Song Jiaoren, founder of the KMT was assassinated, most likely by then-president Yuan Shikai.
1913	12 July	A failed Second Revolution started in Southern China in response to Yuan Shikai's dictatorial policies and the assassination of Song Jiaoren
1915	8 January	Japan issued the Twenty-One Demands to the Republic of China, including demands for territory in Shandong, Manchuria and Inner Mongolia, rights of extraterritoriality for its citizens in China, and influence in China's internal affairs.
1915	15 September	Chen Duxiu founded the magazine New Youth.
1915	12 December	Yuan declared himself the Hongxian Emperor of the Empire of China.
1915		The progressive, anti-Confucian New Culture Movement was founded.
1915	25 December	National Protection War: The republican generals Cai E and Tang Jiyao declared the independence of Yunnan from the Empire of China.
1916	16 June	Yuan died.
1917	7 November	History of the Chinese Communist Party: Bolsheviks led by Marxist leader Vladimir Lenin seized power in Russia in the October Revolution.
1919	4 May	May Fourth Movement: A student protest against the Treaty of Versailles took place at Tiananmen.
1919	28 June	The Treaty of Versailles, among whose provisions was the transfer of German territories in Shandong to Japan, was signed.
1920	14 - 23 July	Zhili–Anhui War, a conflict between the Zhili and Anhui cliques for control of the Beiyang government.
1921	23 July	The Chinese Communist Party (CCP) was founded.
1921	4 December	The first installment of Lu Xun's novel The True Story of Ah Q, the first work written in written vernacular Chinese, was published.
1923	January	The Radio Corporation of China was founded.
1923	6 January	The KMT and CCP agreed to the First United Front, under which Communists would join the KMT as individuals to help combat warlordism.
1924	5 November	The last Emperor of China, Puyi, is evicted from the Forbidden City, severing the last imperial connection to the palace.
1925	12 March	Sun Yat-sen, China's Father of the Nation, dies from cancer.
1926	9 July	Northern Expedition: The KMT general Chiang Kai-shek launched an expedition of some hundred thousand National Revolutionary Army (NRA) soldiers from Guangdong against the warlords Zhang Zuolin, Wu Peifu and Sun Chuanfang.
1927	12 April	Shanghai massacre: KMT forces led by Chiang attack Communist allies in Shanghai, initiating a full-scale purge of Communists in regions under KMT control.
1927	1 August	Nanchang uprising: Communist forces launched an uprising against the KMT in Nanchang.
1928	7 May	Jinan incident: The Japanese general Hikosuke Fukuda tortured and killed seventeen of Chiang's representatives in Jinan.
1928	4 June	Huanggutun incident: Zhang Zuolin's train was blown up by the Japanese Kwantung Army, killing him.
1928	10 October	Chiang became chairman of the Nationalist government of the Republic of China.
1931	July	Encirclement campaign against the Northeastern Jiangxi Soviet: The NRA encircled and invaded the Northeastern Jiangxi Soviet.
1931	July - November	1931 China floods: Flooding began in the valleys of the Yellow, Yangtze and Huai Rivers, which would claim as many as four million lives. As of 2024, it was the deadliest natural disaster ever recorded.
1931	18 September	Mukden incident: In a false flag operation against the Republic of China, Japanese agents set off a dynamite explosion near a South Manchuria Railway line.
1931	18 September	Japanese invasion of Manchuria: The Kwantung Army invaded all Manchurian territory along the South Manchuria Railway.
1931	7 November	The Chinese Soviet Republic was established in Ruijin.
1931	15 December	Chiang resigned under pressure from the KMT. Lin Sen became acting chairman of the Nationalist government.
1932	1 January	Lin Sen became chairman of the Nationalist government.
1932	28 January	January 28 incident: Japanese aircraft carriers began bombing Shanghai in a series of raids which would kill some four thousand soldiers of the 19th Route Army and as many as twenty thousand Chinese civilians.
1932	4 February	Defense of Harbin: Japanese bombs and artillery forced the Jilin Self-Defence Army to retreat from Harbin.
1932	18 February	The independent state of Manchukuo was established on the territory of Japanese-occupied Manchuria.
1932	9 March	Pacification of Manchukuo: The Big Swords Society rebelled en masse against the government of Manchukuo.
1934	February	Chiang and his wife Soong Mei-ling established the quasi-fascist New Life Movement.
1934	16 October	Long March: The Chinese Workers' and Peasants' Red Army broke through the KMT lines attempting to encircle them at Ganzhou.
1935	5 February	First Encirclement Campaign against Hubei–Henan–Shaanxi Soviet: Red Army forces forced the retreat of a KMT army attempting to encircle the soviet of Hubei, Henan and Shaanxi.
1935	9 December	December 9th Movement: A student protest took place in Beijing demanding internal liberalization and stronger anti-Japanese resistance.
1936		Japan opened a biological warfare operation called Unit 731 in Manchukuo.
1936	12 December	Xi'an Incident: Zhang Xueliang arrested Chiang in Xi'an due to concerns he was insufficiently committed to anti-Japanese resistance.
1937	7 March	Marco Polo Bridge incident: Roughly one hundred Chinese soldiers were killed defending the Marco Polo Bridge in Beijing from a Japanese attack.
1937	22 September	The KMT and CCP joined to establish the Second United Front, which led to the Communists recognizing at least for the moment Chiang Kai-shek as China's leader and the official dissolution of the Chinese Soviet Republic. The Red Army was reorganized into the Eighth Route and New Fourth Armies, which were nominally part of the NRA chain of command.
1937	25 September	Battle of Pingxingguan: The Eighth Route Army wiped out a Japanese force of a few hundred attempting to bring supplies through Pingxing Pass.
1937	26 October	Battle of Shanghai: The NRA began withdrawing from downtown Shanghai in the face of a Japanese onslaught.
1937	10 December	Battle of Nanking: The Japanese Central China Area Army launched a full-scale assault on Nanjing.
1937	13 December	Nanjing Massacre: Nanjing fell to the Japanese Central China Area Army. A six-week massacre began in which tens of thousands of women were raped and as many as three hundred thousand civilians were killed.
1938	18 February	Bombing of Chongqing: The Japanese army and naval air services began a bombing campaign against civilian targets in Chongqing which would kill some ten thousand people.
1938	7 April	Battle of Taierzhuang: The Japanese army was forced to withdraw after suffering heavy losses in an attempted conquest of Tai'erzhuang District.
1938	5 June	1938 Yellow River flood: KMT forces destroyed a major dyke in an effort to create a flood to slow down Japanese forces. Nearly a million citizens died.
1939	1 September	The nominally independent Mengjiang was established on the Mongol territories of the Japanese-occupied Chahar and Suiyuan provinces.
1939	17 September	Battle of Changsha: The Japanese army attacked Changsha.
1940	20 August	Hundred Regiments Offensive: Communist NRA soldiers under Peng Dehuai began a campaign of terrorism and sabotage against Japanese targets in North China.
1941	1 February	The Communist official Mao Zedong gave a speech in Yan'an entitled "Reform in Learning, the Party and Literature," establishing the Yan'an Rectification Movement and beginning an ideological purge which would claim some ten thousand lives.
1941	30 September	Battle of Changsha: A Japanese army began a general retreat after failing to take Changsha.
1942	15 January	Battle of Changsha: A Japanese army crossed the Xinqiang River after suffering heavy losses in a failed attempt to conquer Changsha.
1943	1 August	Lin Sen died. Chiang became acting chairman of the Nationalist government.
1943	27 November	Cairo Conference: Chiang, United States president Franklin D. Roosevelt, and British prime minister Winston Churchill issued the Cairo Declaration, under which the three powers expressed their desire for the independence of Korea and the return of Chinese territories.
1944	27 May	Battle of Changsha: The Japanese army launched a general offensive against Changsha.
1945	26 June	The United Nations Charter establishing the United Nations (UN) was signed at the San Francisco War Memorial and Performing Arts Center by fifty nations including China.
1945	6 August	Atomic bombings of Hiroshima and Nagasaki: As many as eighty thousand Japanese, largely civilians, were killed in the atomic bombing of Hiroshima by a United States aircraft.
1945	9 September	Surrender of Japan: Japanese forces in China formally surrendered to Chiang Kai-shek.
1945	25 October	Surrender of Japan: China regains control of Taiwan from Japan and was proclaimed as Retrocession Day. Chen Yi of the Kuomintang was appointed Chief Executive.
1945	November	Campaign to Suppress Bandits in Northeast China: The Communist People's Liberation Army (PLA) launched a campaign against bandits and KMT guerillas in northeast China.
1946	20 July	Chinese Civil War: The NRA invaded PLA-held territory en masse.
1947	28 February	February 28 Incident: Nationalist forces violently suppressed an anti-government protest in Taiwan Province.
1947	25 December	The Constitution of the Republic of China came into force, dissolving the Nationalist government and renaming the NRA the Republic of China (ROC) Armed Forces.
1948	2 November	Liaoshen Campaign: The last ROC garrison in Manchuria, in Yingkou, retreated in the face of a PLA advance.
1948	15 December	Huaihai Campaign: The PLA encircled an ROC army in Xuzhou.
1949	21 January	Chiang resigned the presidency of the Republic of China due to military failures and under pressure from his vice president Li Zongren, who succeeded him as acting president.
1949	31 January	Pingjin Campaign: The PLA took Beijing.
1949	23 April	Chinese Civil War: The PLA conquered the ROC capital Nanjing. The ROC moved its capital to Guangzhou.
1949	19 May	The ROC government imposes the 38-year martial law in Taiwan
1949	1 October	Mao declared the establishment of the People's Republic of China (PRC).
1949	10 December	The ROC moved its capital from Chengdu to Taipei.
1950	5 March	Landing Operation on Hainan Island: Chinese forces landed on ROC-controlled Hainan.
1950	25 June	Korean War: The North Korean army launched a 135,000-man surprise assault across the 38th parallel into South Korea.
1950	25 November	Battle of the Ch'ongch'on River: The Chinese 38th Group Army broke the UN line between the 7th Infantry Division and 8th Infantry Division in the valley of the Chongchon River.
1950		Mass executions of political prisoners took place in the Canidrome.
1951	23 May	Representatives of the Dalai Lama of Tibet the 14th Dalai Lama and of the Central People's Government of the People's Republic of China signed the Seventeen Point Agreement for the Peaceful Liberation of Tibet, which guaranteed Tibetan autonomy within China and called for the integration of the Tibetan Army into the PLA.
1952	January	The five-anti campaign, which encouraged accusations against the bourgeoisie of crimes such as bribery and tax evasion, was founded. see Three-anti and Five-anti Campaigns
1953		The first of the five-year plans of China, which called for construction of heavy industry, began to be carried out.
1955	20 January	Battle of Yijiangshan Islands: People's Liberation Army captures the Yijiangshan Islands near Zhejiang from the ROC forces.
1956		An outbreak of the Influenza A virus subtype H2N2 occurred in China.
1957	27 February	Mao published a speech entitled "On the Correct Handling of the Contradictions Among the People," marking the founding of the Hundred Flowers Campaign which encouraged criticism of the government and the Communist Party.
1957	July	Mao instigated the Anti-Rightist Movement during which hundreds of thousands of alleged rightists, including many who had criticized the government during the Hundred Flowers Campaign, were purged from the CCP or sentenced to labor or death.
1958		Great Leap Forward: The CCP led campaigns to massively overhaul the Chinese economy and society with such innovations as collective farming and the use of backyard furnaces.
1958		Mao launched the Four Pests Campaign, which encouraged the eradication of rats, flies, mosquitos and sparrows.
1958		Second Taiwan Strait Crisis: PLA fails to capture ROC-held islands of Quemoy and Matsu Islands in Fujian.
1959	10 March	1959 Tibetan uprising: A rebellion broke out in the Tibetan regional capital Lhasa after rumors the government was planning to arrest the 14th Dalai Lama at the local PLA headquarters.
1959		Great Chinese Famine: A famine began which would claim as many as forty million lives over three years.
1960	16 April	Sino-Soviet split: A CCP newspaper accused the Soviet leadership of "revisionism."
1962	20 October	Sino-Indian War: The PLA attacked Indian forces across the Line of Actual Control.
1964	5 January	Quotations from Chairman Mao Tse-tung was first published.
1964	16 October	596: The Chinese government detonated its first nuclear weapon at Lop Nur.
1964		The ROC government outlaws Taiwanese Hokkien language in schools and official settings
1964		The second of two volumes of Simplified Chinese characters ordered by the State Council of China was published.
1966	19 August	Cultural Revolution: The CCP launched a campaign to destroy the Four Olds.
1966		The Three-Self Patriotic Movement, the sole government-sanctioned Protestant church, was abolished.
1968		Deng Pufang was thrown from a third-story window at Peking University by Red Guards, crippling him.
1968	22 December	The People's Daily published an editorial entitled "We too have two hands, let us not laze about in the city," invigorating the Down to the Countryside Movement under which the sent-down youth, many former Red Guards, were relocated from the cities to the country.
1969	2 March	Sino-Soviet border conflict: PLA forces attacked the Soviet Border Troops of the Soviet Union on Zhenbao Island, killing 59.
1969	1 October	The Beijing Subway opened.
1970	24 April	China launched Dong Fang Hong I, its first satellite.
1971	July	United States secretary of state Henry Kissinger visited Beijing.
1971	13 September	Cultural Revolution: Lin Biao dies in mysterious air crash after failed coup.
1971	25 October	China and the United Nations: The People's Republic of China is admitted to the United Nations, replacing the Republic of China.
1972	28 February	1972 Nixon visit to China: The United States and China issued the Shanghai Communiqué pledging to normalize relations during the visit of the former's president Richard Nixon.
1974	19 January	Battle of the Paracel Islands: Some fifty South Vietnamese soldiers were killed in a Chinese conquest of the Paracel Islands.
1975	5 April	Chiang Kai-shek died.
1976	8 January	The premier Zhou Enlai died.
1976	5 April	Tiananmen Incident: Some four thousand people were arrested during a protest against the removal of wreaths, flowers and poems laid at the Monument to the People's Heroes in Zhou's memory.
1976	27 July	1976 Tangshan earthquake: An earthquake with its epicenter near Tangshan killed roughly a quarter of a million people.
1976	9 September	Mao died.
1976	6 October	The Gang of Four, a political faction including Mao's wife Jiang Qing, was arrested on the orders of the premier Hua Guofeng.
1976	7 October	Hua became Chairman of the Chinese Communist Party.
1977		Beijing Spring: A brief period of political liberalization began.
1978	11 October	The poet Huang Xiang pasted pro-democracy, anti-Mao poems on the Democracy Wall in Beijing.
1978	December	The Communist official Deng Xiaoping became paramount leader of China.
1978	December	Reform and opening up: Economic liberalization measures including the replacement of collective farming with the household-responsibility system began to be instituted.
1978	December	Deng Xiaoping first advocated for the Four Modernizations, of agriculture, industry, national defense and science and technology.
1979	1 January	China and the United States issued the Joint Communiqué on the Establishment of Diplomatic Relations, under which the latter recognized the PRC as the legitimate government of China and terminated its participation in the Sino-American Mutual Defense Treaty with Taiwan.
1979	6 March	Sino-Vietnamese War: China declared that the punitive objective of its invasion of Vietnam had been achieved and began to retreat.
1979	30 March	Deng Xiaoping declared in a speech the Four Cardinal Principles not subject to debate within China.
1980		The first of the Special Economic Zones of China, characterized by low regulation and the encouragement of foreign investment, were established.
1980	28 June	Sino-Vietnamese conflicts 1979–90: Chinese forces began shelling the Vietnamese Cao Bằng Province.
1980	18 September	The one-child policy, under which Chinese couples are heavily fined for additional children after their first, with some exceptions, came into force, and then phased out in 2015.
1984	19 December	The Sino-British Joint Declaration, under which China and the United Kingdom agreed to the transfer of Hong Kong to China and the preservation there of democracy and capitalism under the one country, two systems model, was signed during the visit of the British prime minister Margaret Thatcher.
1987	7 May	1987 Lieyu massacre: 19 people killed by the Republic of China Army targeting Vietnamese boat people near the coast of Kinmen.
1987		Martial law in Taiwan lifted.
1988	14 March	Johnson South Reef Skirmish: The PLA took control of the Johnson South Reef after a short naval battle in which some seventy Vietnamese soldiers were killed.
1989	15 April	Tiananmen Square protests of 1989: A crowd gathered at the Monument to the People's Heroes.
1989	4 June	Tiananmen Square protests of 1989: Anywhere from 241 to 5 thousand people killed in the Tiananmen Square Massacre.
1989	24 June	Jiang Zemin became General Secretary of the Chinese Communist Party.
1990	18 March	Wild Lily student movement in Chiang Kai-shek Memorial Hall which saw less bloodshed compared to the Tiananmen protests in Beijing.
1990		Shanghai Stock Exchange re-opened on 26 November and began operation on 19 December.
1991	1 May	Legislative Yuan and National Assembly delegates elected in 1947 resigns.
1991	26 December	The Soviet Union officially dissolves leaving the People's Republic of China as the only major communist state on Earth.
1991		The first McDonald's restaurant in mainland China opened in Beijing.
1992		First free democratic elections for the Legislative Yuan held since 1948 in Taiwan only.
1992		Deng Xiaoping traveled south to reassert the economy policy.
1993	27 April	Wang–Koo summit took place in Singapore: the first public meeting between figures of non-governmental organization (NGO) since 1949.
1994	8 December	1994 Karamay fire: A fire at a theater in Karamay killed some three hundred people.
1996		The first direct presidential elections in Chinese history took place in Taiwan with Lee Teng-hui and the Kuomintang retaining power.
1997	19 February	Deng Xiaoping died.
1997	1 July	Hong Kong handover ceremony: A ceremony marked the return of sovereignty over Hong Kong to China from the United Kingdom under the terms of the Sino-British Joint Declaration.
1997		The term Great Firewall was coined to describe the tools of Internet censorship in China.
1998	June	1998 China floods: China experienced massive flooding including floods of the Yangtze River, the Nen River, the Songhua River and the Pearl River. The People's Liberation Army gained further respect for their actions amongst the people.
1999	7 May	United States bombing of the Chinese embassy in Belgrade: United States bombers under the command of the North Atlantic Treaty Organization accidentally bombed the Chinese embassy in Belgrade.
1999	22 July	The Chinese Communist Party declared the religious organization Falun Gong illegal.
1999	20 December	Transfer of sovereignty over Macau: Sovereignty over Macau was transferred from Portugal to China.
2000		China passed Japan as the country with which the United States has the largest trade deficit.

== 21st century ==
Year	Date	Event
2000		Chen Shui-bian, the opposition candidate from the native DPP, elected president by a lead of 2.5% of votes marking the end of the KMT rule of China. Voter turnout was 82.69%; first peaceful transfer of power since the formation of the Chinese Republic in 1912 and in Taiwan since 1945.
2000		Four Noes and One Without.
2001	23 January	Tiananmen Square self-immolation incident: Five declared by Chinese government members of Falun Gong may have burned themselves to death in Tiananmen Square.
2001	1 April	Hainan Island incident: A United States intelligence aircraft was intercepted and forced to make an emergency landing on Hainan.
2001	10 November	World Trade Organization Ministerial Conference of 2001: The PRC joined the World Trade Organization, subjecting it to that body's free trade and dispute resolution agreements. The following year, the ROC joined the WTO under the name Separate Customs Territory of Taiwan, Penghu, Kinmen and Matsu to adhere with the One China policy.
2002	15 November	16th National Congress of the Chinese Communist Party: Hu Jintao succeeded Jiang Zemin as General Secretary of the Chinese Communist Party.
2002	16 November	An outbreak of severe acute respiratory syndrome began in Guangdong.
2003	15 October	The PRC launched its first crewed space mission Shenzhou 5.
2004	19 September	Jiang Zemin resigned his position as chairman of the Central Military Commission of the Chinese Communist Party and succeeded by Hu Jintao.
2005	14 March	The controversial Anti-Secession Law was passed, reasserting the PRC's desire for "peaceful reunification" with Taiwan and its right to resolve the issue by force. In response, 1.6 million people marched in Taipei against the PRC's "anti-secession law". Similar marches occur across the world by Taiwanese nationalists. Protests against the PRC were held worldwide, including, but not limited to: Chicago, New York City, Washington DC, Paris, and Sydney.
2005	March-April	Pan-Blue leaders visit to mainland China
2005	15 April	2005 anti-Japanese demonstrations: Mass demonstrations against Japan took place.
2005	13 November	2005 Jilin chemical plant explosions: A series of explosions at a chemical plant in Jilin City killed six and forced the evacuation of tens of thousands.
2005		President Chen is invited and attends the funeral of Pope John Paul II. He is the first ROC president to visit the Vatican.
2005		The National Assembly of the Republic of China convenes for the last time to implement several constitutional reforms, including single-member two-vote districts, and votes to transfer the power of constitutional reform to the popular ballot, essentially abolishing itself.
2007	7 May	2007 Chinese slave scandal: A local television station first reported on missing children kidnapped to work as slaves at brickyards in Shanxi.
2007	10 July	Zheng Xiaoyu, the former head of the State Food and Drug Administration, was executed for corruption.
2007	3 August	The State Administration for Religious Affairs issued State Religious Affairs Bureau Order No. 5, which required tulkus who planned to be reincarnated to submit an application to the government.
2007	24 October	The lunar orbiter Chang'e 1 was launched.
2008	25 January	2008 Chinese winter storms: A series of severe winter storms began which would claim over a hundred lives.
2008	22 March	2008 presidential election; with 58.48% of the vote, KMT candidate Ma Ying-jeou defeats DPP candidate Frank Hsieh. Many voters boycott the referendum on whether and how to join UN so the level of voter participation required for referendum to be considered valid is not achieved.
2008	1 May	The Hangzhou Bay Bridge opened to the public.
2008	12 May	2008 Sichuan earthquake: An earthquake with its epicenter in Wenchuan County killed nearly seventy thousand people.
2008	20 May	Ma Ying-jeou sworn into office as the 12th President of ROC. Second peaceful transfer of power with the Kuomintang regaining control of the presidency. Tsai Ing-wen inaugurate as the Chairperson of DPP.
2008	16 July	2008 Chinese milk scandal: Sixteen infants were diagnosed with kidney stones in Gansu after drinking formula contaminated with melamine.
2008	8 August	2008 Summer Olympics opening ceremony: A ceremony marked the beginning of the Olympic Games in Beijing.
2008	6 September	2008 Summer Paralympics: The thirteenth Paralympic Games began in Beijing.
2008	27 September	The astronaut Zhai Zhigang completed China's first spacewalk on Shenzhou 7.
2008	6 November	Wild Strawberries Movement in Taiwan.
2009	5 July	July 2009 Ürümqi riots: A riot of some thousand Uyghurs began which involved ethnic violence against the Han in Ürümqi.
2009	1 October	60th anniversary of the People's Republic of China: A military parade on Chang'an Avenue in Beijing commemorated the establishment of the PRC.
2010	14 April	2010 Yushu earthquake: An earthquake with its epicenter in Yushu killed as many as three thousand people.
2010	1 May	Expo 2010: A world's fair began in Shanghai.
2011	21 September	Wukan protests: Farmers in Wukan attacked a government building due to the government's seizure without compensation of their farmland.
2011	29 September	Tiangong-1 was launched as China's first prototype space station.
2011	10 October	The 100th Anniversary of the Xinhai Revolution and Republic of China was commemorated.
2012	6 February	Wang Lijun incident: Wang Lijun, a deputy of Bo Xilai, the Party Committee Secretary of Chongqing, sought refuge at a United States consulate.
2012	4 July	The Three Gorges Dam went into operation.
2012	19 August	2012 China anti-Japanese demonstrations: Anti-Japanese protests took place in China due to the Senkaku Islands dispute.
2012	15 November	18th National Congress of the Chinese Communist Party: Xi Jinping succeeded Hu Jintao as General Secretary of the Chinese Communist Party and the Chairman of the Central Military Commission.
2013		One Belt, One Road was proposed to connect and cooperate among countries primarily between China and rest of Eurasia.
2013	29 September	The Shanghai Free-Trade Zone was established.
2013	28 October	2013 Tiananmen Square attack: A car was driven into a crowd in Tiananmen Square, killing the driver and two passengers, Uyghurs associated with the East Turkestan Islamic Movement, and two pedestrians.
2013	14 December	The lunar lander Chang'e 3 landed on the moon.
2014		China became the world's second largest economy.
2014	1 March	2014 Kunming attack is a terrorist attack, killing 31 civilians and injuring more than 140 others. No group or individual stepped forward to claim responsibility for the attack.
2014	18 March	Sunflower Student Movement in Taiwan, students occupy the Legislative Yuan force to halt the enforcement of Cross-Strait Service Trade Agreement.
2015	17 June	2015–2016 Chinese stock market turbulence started.
2015	3 September	2015 China Victory Day Parade was held on the Tiananmen Square.
2015	November	Ma Ying-jeou meets with Xi Jinping, the first Cross-Strait leader meeting.
2016	16 January	presidential election; with 56.3% of the vote, DPP candidate Tsai Ing-wen defeats KMT candidate Eric Chu.
2016	20 May	Tsai Ing-wen sworn into office as the 14th President of ROC. Third peaceful transfer of power and first female President in Chinese history.
2016	4 September	2016 G20 Hangzhou summit was held in the city of Hangzhou.
2016	15 September	Tiangong-2 was launched with mission of more than ten scientific experiments.
2017	25 October	19th National Congress of the Chinese Communist Party: Xi Jinping was re-elected as the General Secretary of the Chinese Communist Party and the Chairman of the Central Military Commission.
2018	March	Xi Jinping removed the term limits of the Presidency.
2019	24 May	Same-sex marriage becomes legal in Taiwan.
2019	1 October	70th Anniversary of the People's Republic of China military parade held in Tiananmen Square
2019	December	First case of COVID-19 identified in Wuhan leading into the subsequent pandemic.
2020	16 January	Tsai Ing-wen re-elected as ROC President continuing deterioration of relations with the PRC.
2020	30 June	Hong Kong national security law passed.
2021	2 April	2021 Hualien train derailment: A Taroko Express train was derailed at Hualien County killing 49 passengers and injuring 200 others.
2021	1 July	100th Anniversary of the Chinese Communist Party was held as part of the Two Centenaries.
2022	22 October	Hu Jintao removal incident.
2022	23 October	Xi Jinping was re-elected as General Secretary of the Chinese Communist Party for a precedent-breaking third term of paramount leader after Mao Zedong's death.
2022	2 November	2022 COVID-19 protests in China.
2022	30 November	Death and state funeral of former CCP General Secretary Jiang Zemin.
2023	27 October	Death of former Chinese Premier Li Keqiang.
2024	13 January	Presidential election; with 40.05% of the vote, DPP candidate Lai Ching-te defeats KMT candidate Hou Yu-ih and TPP candidate Ko Wen-je.
2024	23 January	2024 Uqturpan earthquake occurs.
2024	20 May	Lai Ching-te sworn into office as the 16th President of ROC. Fourth peaceful transfer of power and first time a party wins three consecutive presidential terms.
2025	7 January	2025 Tibet earthquake occurs.
2025	25 May	The world's first humanoid robot fighting competition happens in Hangzhou.
2025	3 September	2025 China Victory Day Parade was held in Tiananmen Square.
2026	22 October	2026 Tibet earthquake occurs.

== Timeline of Chinese dynasties ==
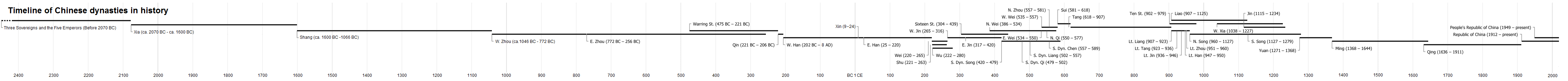
Timeline of major Chinese dynasties and states

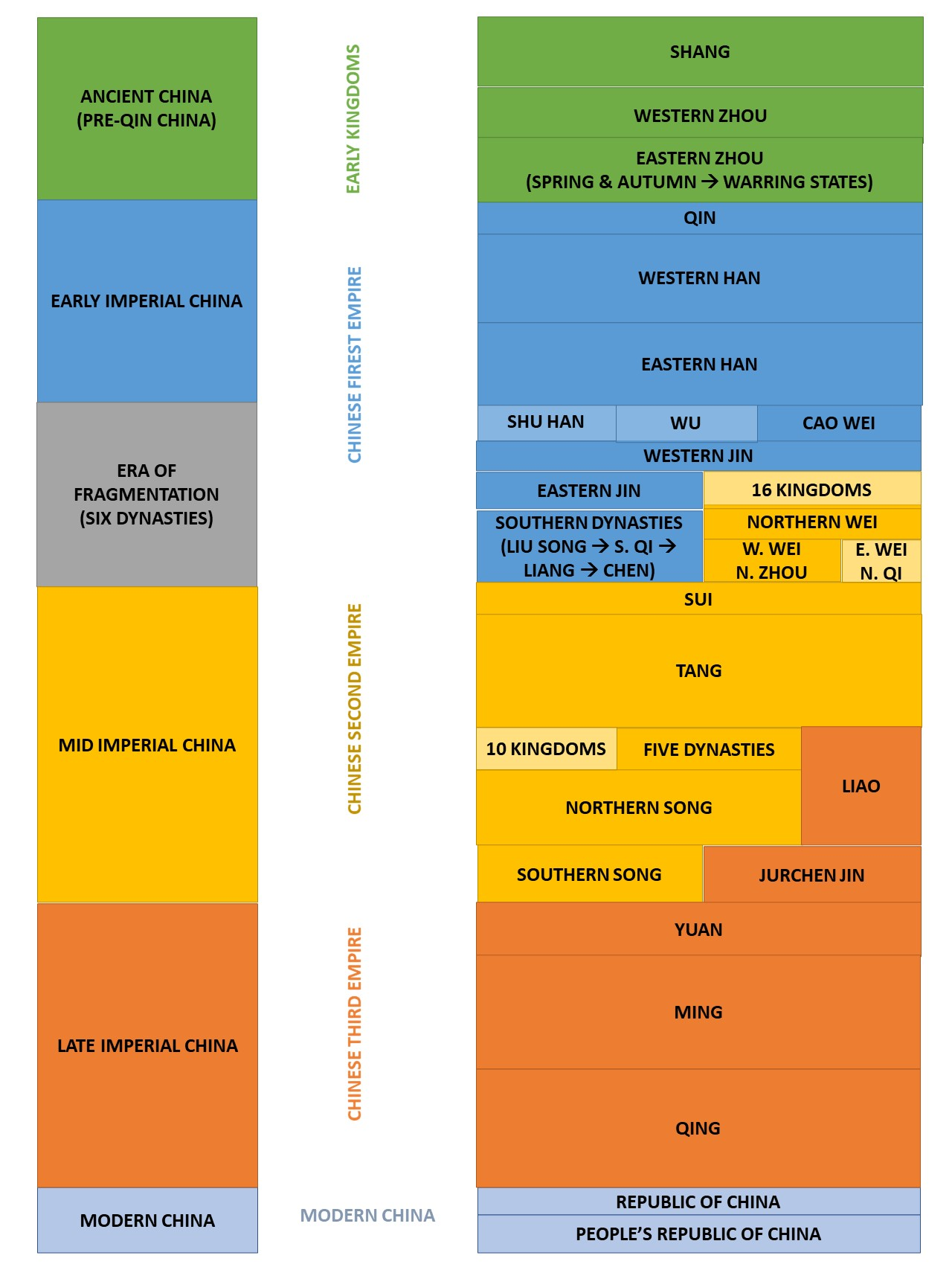
Divisions of Chinese history and their corresponding dynasties

== See also ==
- List of Chinese monarchs
- Chinese emperors family tree (disambiguation)
- Years in China

Cities in China

Timeline of Putian

- Timeline of Fuzhou
- Timeline of Guangzhou
- Timeline of Hangzhou
- Timeline of Nanjing
- Timeline of Shanghai
- Timeline of Hong Kong history

Related

- Timeline of Taiwanese history
- Timeline of Tibetan history
