= 375th =

375th may refer to:

- 375th Air Mobility Wing, unit of the United States Air Force assigned to Eighteenth Air Forcestationed at Scott Air Force Base, Illinois
- 375th Bombardment Squadron, inactive United States Air Force unit
- 375th Fighter Squadron or 172d Air Support Squadron, unit of the Michigan Air National Guard 110th Airlift Wing
- 375th Operations Group, the operational flying component of the United States Air Force 375th Air Mobility Wing

== See also ==
- 375 (number)
- 375, the year 375 (CCCLXXV) of the Julian calendar
- 375 BC
