= King Shenjing of Zhou =

Zhou Dynasty king of China from 320 to 315 BC

King Shenjing of Zhou 周慎靚王

King of the Zhou dynasty
- Reign: 320–315 BC
- Predecessor: King Xian of Zhou
- Successor: King Nan of Zhou
- Died: 315 BC
- Issue: King Nan of Zhou
Names
- Ancestral name: Jī (姬); Given name: Dìng (定) or Shùn (順)
Posthumous name
- King Shenjing (慎靚王)
- House: Ji
- Dynasty: Zhou (Eastern Zhou)
- Father: King Xian of Zhou

King Shenjing of Zhou

Posthumous name
- Chinese: 周慎靚王
- Literal meaning: The Cautious and Beautiful King of Zhou
Transcriptions
Standard Mandarin
- Hanyu Pinyin: Zhōu Shènjìng Wáng
- Wade–Giles: Chou Shènchìng-wang; King Shènchìng of Chou

King Shenjing of Zhou (Chinese: 周慎靚王; pinyin: Zhōu Shènjìng Wáng), personal name Ji Ding, was the 36th and penultimate king of China's Zhou dynasty.

He was a son of his predecessor, King Xian, and thus nephew of King Lie; his paternal grandfather was King An. He reigned from 320 BC until his death in 315 BC.

King Shenjing was succeeded by his son, King Nan, who went on to have a very long reign.

== Family ==
Sons:

- Prince Yan (王子延; d. 256 BC), ruled as King Nan of Zhou from 314–256 BC

== See also ==
Family tree of ancient Chinese emperors

King Shenjing of Zhou Zhou dynasty Died: 315 BC
Regnal titles
Preceded by King Xian of Zhou	King of China; 320–315 BC	Succeeded by King Nan of Zhou
