= 321 BC =

321 BC in various calendars
- Gregorian calendar: 321 BC; CCCXXI BC
- Ab urbe condita: 433
- Ancient Egypt era: XXXIII dynasty, 3
- Pharaoh: Ptolemy I Soter, 3
- Ancient Greek Olympiad (summer): 114th Olympiad, year 4
- Assyrian calendar: 4430
- Balinese saka calendar: N/A
- Bengali calendar: −914 – −913
- Berber calendar: 630
- Buddhist calendar: 224
- Burmese calendar: −958
- Byzantine calendar: 5188–5189
- Chinese calendar: 己亥年 (Earth Pig); 2377 or 2170 — to — 庚子年 (Metal Rat); 2378 or 2171
- Coptic calendar: −604 – −603
- Discordian calendar: 846
- Ethiopian calendar: −328 – −327
- Hebrew calendar: 3440–3441
- Hindu calendars
- Vikram Samvat: −264 – −263
- Shaka Samvat: N/A
- Kali Yuga: 2780–2781
- Holocene calendar: 9680
- Iranian calendar: 942 BP – 941 BP
- Islamic calendar: 971 BH – 970 BH
- Javanese calendar: N/A
- Julian calendar: N/A
- Korean calendar: 2013
- Minguo calendar: 2232 before ROC 民前2232年
- Nanakshahi calendar: −1788
- Thai solar calendar: 222–223
- Tibetan calendar: ས་མོ་ཕག་ལོ་ (female Earth-Boar) −194 or −575 or −1347 — to — ལྕགས་ཕོ་བྱི་བ་ལོ་ (male Iron-Rat) −193 or −574 or −1346

Year 321 BC was a year of the pre-Julian Roman calendar. At the time, it was known as the Year of the Consulship of Calvinus and Caudinus (or, less frequently, year 433 Ab urbe condita). The denomination 321 BC for this year has been used since the early medieval period, when the Anno Domini calendar era became the prevalent method in Europe for naming years.

== Events ==
=== By place ===
==== Macedonian Empire ====
- Antipater appoints Antigonus commander in chief of his army in Asia Minor and sends him with Craterus to fight against Eumenes, the satrap of Cappadocia and a supporter of Perdiccas.
- Leaving Eumenes to hold Asia Minor against Craterus and Antigonus, Perdiccas marches against Ptolemy, but when he fails to cross the Nile he is murdered by mutinous officers. Prominent among the mutineers is Seleucus. A truce is arranged, leaving Ptolemy in power in Egypt and Seleucus in power in Babylon.
- The key remaining generals (diadochi) of the late Alexander the Great agree to the Partition of Triparadisus (a town in northern Syria). This is a power-sharing agreement providing for a new regent to replace Perdiccas and it repartitions the satrapies of the empire that has been created by Alexander the Great. It follows but modifies the Partition of Babylon made two years earlier following the death of Alexander the Great. Under the agreement, Antipater becomes the regent of the Macedonian Empire on behalf of the two kings: the intellectually disabled Philip III Arrhidaeus and the infant Alexander IV of Macedon while Ptolemy is confirmed in possession of Egypt and Cyrene.
- Ptolemy further strengthens his position amongst the diadochi by marrying Eurydice, the third daughter of Antipater.
- Antigonus and Craterus defeat Eumenes in battle but Eumenes escapes. Antigonus and Craterus then besiege him unsuccessfully in the mountain fortress of Nora on the border between Cappadocia and Lycaonia. Craterus is killed during the fighting against Eumenes when his charging horse (Diodorus) falls over him.

==== Roman Republic ====
- Continuing successes by Rome's armies against the Samnites forces the Samnites to sue for peace. However, the terms offered by Rome are so stringent that they are rejected by the Samnites and the war goes on.
- Two Roman consuls, Spurius Postumius Albinus and Titus Veturius Calvinus, leading an invading force into Samnium, are trapped in a mountain pass known as the Caudine Forks (Caudium) near Beneventum, where they can neither advance nor retire, and after a desperate struggle, they are forced to submit to the humiliating terms imposed by the Samnite victor, Gaius Pontius. The captured consuls pledge themselves to a five-year treaty on terms most favourable for the Samnites.

==== India ====
- Chandragupta Maurya, founder of the Mauryan empire, establishes himself as the king of Magadha.

== Deaths ==
- Craterus, Macedonian general (b. c. 370 BC)
- Perdiccas, Macedonian general and regent after the death of Alexander the Great (b. c. 365 BC)
- Zhou Xian Wang, King of the Zhou Dynasty of China
