= King Weilie of Zhou =

Zhou Dynasty king of China from 425 to 402 BC

King Weilie of Zhou 周威烈王

King of the Zhou dynasty
- Reign: 425–402 BC
- Predecessor: King Kao of Zhou
- Successor: King An of Zhou
- Died: 402 BC
- Issue: King An of Zhou
Names
- Ancestral name: Jī (姬); Given name: Wǔ (午)
Posthumous name
- King Weilie (威烈王)
- House: Ji
- Dynasty: Zhou (Eastern Zhou)
- Father: King Kao of Zhou

King Weilie of Zhou

Posthumous name
- Chinese: 周威烈王
- Literal meaning: The Mighty King of Zhou; The Powerful and Strong King of Zhou
Transcriptions
Standard Mandarin
- Hanyu Pinyin: Zhōu Wēiliè Wáng
- Wade–Giles: Chou Wēiliè-wang; King Wēiliè of Chou

King Weilie of Zhou (Chinese: 周威烈王; pinyin: Zhōu Wēiliè Wáng), personal name Ji Wu, was the 32nd king of the Chinese Zhou dynasty.

His reign started in 425 BC, after his father King Kao had died, and lasted until his death in 402 BC.

During King Weilie's reign, he created Han, Wei and Zhao as feudal states separate from Jin, to act as a buffer between his royal domain and Qin (nominally one of his subject states).

King Weilie was succeeded by his son, King An.

== Family ==
Sons:

- Prince Jiao (王子驕; d. 376 BC), ruled as King An of Zhou from 401–376 BC

== See also ==
Family tree of ancient Chinese emperors

King Weilie of Zhou Zhou dynasty Died: 402 BC
Regnal titles
Preceded by King Kao of Zhou	King of China; 425–402 BC	Succeeded by King An of Zhou
