= Wang Xiuchu =

17th-century Chinese scholar

Wang Xiuchu (Chinese: 王秀楚) was a 17th-century Chinese middle-class scholar who lived through the conquest of the Ming dynasty by the Manchu-ruled Qing dynasty. Wang's most significant accomplishment is his writing of the "Yangzhou shiri ji" (扬州十日记, Account of Ten Days of Yangzhou) an account that details his survival of the notorious massacre of Yangzhou that was perpetrated by the Manchu prince Dodo. In this account, five members of Wang's extended family are killed by Qing troops, and he witnesses the rapes and killings of many of his neighbors. In the end of the narrative, he is rescued by a sympathetic Manchu officer who orders his soldiers to spare the lives of Wang and his surviving family members.

Wang's account is also used as verification to the death of the Ming viceroy in Yangzhou, Shi Kefa.

Wang is only known through his Yangzhou account, and it is not known what happened to him or his family afterwards.
