= 375 BC =

375 BC in various calendars
Gregorian calendar	375 BC; CCCLXXV BC
Ab urbe condita	379
Ancient Egypt era	XXX dynasty, 6
Pharaoh	Nectanebo I, 6
Ancient Greek Olympiad (summer)	101st Olympiad, year 2
Assyrian calendar	4376
Balinese saka calendar	N/A
Bengali calendar	−968 – −967
Berber calendar	576
Buddhist calendar	170
Burmese calendar	−1012
Byzantine calendar	5134–5135
Chinese calendar	乙巳年 (Wood Snake); 2323 or 2116 — to — 丙午年 (Fire Horse); 2324 or 2117
Coptic calendar	−658 – −657
Discordian calendar	792
Ethiopian calendar	−382 – −381
Hebrew calendar	3386–3387
- Hindu calendars
Vikram Samvat	−318 – −317
Shaka Samvat	N/A
Kali Yuga	2726–2727
Holocene calendar	9626
Iranian calendar	996 BP – 995 BP
Islamic calendar	1027 BH – 1026 BH
Javanese calendar	N/A
Julian calendar	N/A
Korean calendar	1959
Minguo calendar	2286 before ROC 民前2286年
Nanakshahi calendar	−1842
Thai solar calendar	168–169
Tibetan calendar	阴木蛇年 (female Wood-Snake) −248 or −629 or −1401 — to — 阳火马年 (male Fire-Horse) −247 or −628 or −1400

Year 375 BC was a year of the pre-Julian Roman calendar. At the time, it was known as the First year without Tribunate or Consulship (or, less frequently, year 379 Ab urbe condita). The denomination 375 BC for this year has been used since the early medieval period, when the Anno Domini calendar era became the prevalent method in Europe for naming years.

== Events ==
=== By place ===
==== Greece ====
- The Theban general, Pelopidas, is made the leader of the Sacred Band, a selected infantry body of 300.
- Learning that the Spartan garrison of Orchomenus (in Boeotia) is leaving for an expedition to Locris, Pelopidas sets out with the Sacred Band of Thebes and a small force of cavalry, intending to seize the city while it is unguarded. However, as the Thebans approach the city, they learn that a sizable force has been dispatched from Sparta to reinforce the garrison at Orchomenus and is approaching the city. Pelopidas retreats with his force, but before the Thebans can reach safety at Tegyra, they meet the original Spartan garrison returning from Locris. In the ensuing Battle of Tegyra, the Thebans rout the larger Spartan force.

==== China ====
- Zhou Lie Wang becomes king of the Zhou dynasty of China.

== Births ==
- Cleitus the Black, Macedonian general of Alexander the Great (approximate date)
- Chanakya, ancient Indian teacher, author, strategist and royal advisor.

== Deaths ==
- Hippocrates, Greek physician (approximate year)
