= Timeline of Fuzhou =

The following is a timeline of the history of the city of Fuzhou, Fujian Province, China.

== Prior to 10th century ==
- 2nd century BCE - City called "Ye."
- 2nd century CE - City renamed "Houguan."
- 220 CE - Hans in power (approximate date).
- 527 - Dizang Temple founded.
- 789 - City "divided into two counties."
- 799 - Wu Ta (乌塔) "Black Pagoda" built.

== 10th-13th centuries ==
- 901 - City outer walls built.
- 904 - Bai Ta (白塔) "White Pagoda" built.
- 909 - City becomes capital of Kingdom of Min.
- 915 - Yongquan Temple founded.
- 948 - City renamed "Fuzhou."
- 1283 - Provincial capital relocated to Fuzhou from Zeytoon.

== 19th century ==
- 1843 - Port opens to European commerce per Treaty of Nanking.
- 1845 - British consulate established.
- 1847 - American Presbyterian Mission active.
- 1860 - St. John's Church dedicated.
- 1871 - Foochow Arsenal constructed.
- 1874 - Flood.
- 1878 - 30 August: Demonstration against missionaries.
- 1881 - Anglo-Chinese College founded.
- 1884 - 23–26 August: Battle of Fuzhou.
- 1892 - Population: 635,000 (estimate).

== 20th century ==
- 1907 - Fujian Normal University founded.
- 1911 - Uprising.
- 1933 - November: Fujian People's Government headquartered in Fuzhou.
- 1936 - Fujian Agriculture and Forestry University founded.
- 1937 - Fujian Medical University founded.
- 1938 - Japanese occupation begins.
- 1945 - Japanese occupation ends.
- 1949 - Fujian Ribao newspaper in publication.
- 1956 - Railway begins operating.
- 1957 - Population: 616,000.
- 1958 - Fuzhou University founded.
- 1966 - Saint Dominic's Cathedral closes.
- 1979 - Flower Lane Church reopens.
- 1983 - Fuzhou administration formed into 5 districts and 8 counties.
- 1985 - Fuzhou Economic & Technological Development Zone established.
- 1990 - Population: 1,395,739.
- 1991 - Fuzhou High-tech Development Zone and Fuzhou Science and Technology Park approved.
- 1992 - Fuzhou Free Trade Zone established.
- 1997 - Fuzhou Changle International Airport inaugurated.

== 21st century ==
- 2005 - Fuzhou Export Processing Zone established.
- 2006 - Population: 1,457,626 (estimate).
- 2008 - April: Protests.
- 2010 - Yuan Rongxiang becomes CPC Party chief.
- 2012 - November: World Summit on Internet and Multimedia held.
- 2016 - Fuzhou Metro began operating.
- 2019 - Coronavirus (COVID-19)

== See also ==
- Fuzhou history
- List of universities and colleges in Fuzhou
- Urbanization in China

== Bibliography ==
Published in the 18th-19th centuries

- J.-B Du Halde (1741), "The Fourth Province of the Empire of China, Fo kien: The First Capital City of the Province, Fou tcheou fou", General History of China (3rd ed.), London: J. Watts
- Gazetteer of Fuzhou. 1754.
- Henry Charles Sirr (1849), "Foo-Chow-Foo", China and the Chinese, London: Orr
- S. Wells Williams (1863), "Port of Fuhchau", Chinese Commercial Guide (5th ed.), Hongkong: A. Shortrede & Co
- "Fuh-Chow" . Encyclopædia Britannica. Vol. 11 (9th ed.). 1880. p. 812.
- "Foochow". The Chronicle & Directory for China, Corea, Japan, the Philippines, Indo-China, Straits Settlements, Siam, Borneo, Malay States, &c. Hong Kong: Daily Press. 1892.

Published in the 20th century

- "Foo-Choo", Lippincott's Gazetteer of the World, Philadelphia: J.B. Lippincott, 1902
- Marco Polo; Henry Yule (1903), "Concerning the Greatness of the City of Fuju", The Book of Ser Marco Polo (3rd ed.), London: John Murray
- Claudius Madrolle (c. 1904). "Fou-tcheou". Chine du Sud (in French). Comité de l'asie française.
- Arnold Wright, ed. (1908), "Foochow", Twentieth Century Impressions of Hongkong, Shanghai, and Other Treaty Ports of China, London: Lloyd's Greater Britain Pub. Co.
- "Fuchow" . Encyclopædia Britannica. Vol. 11 (11th ed.). 1910. pp. 271–272.
- Julean Arnold (1919). "Foochow Consular District". Commercial handbook of China. United States. Bureau of Foreign and Domestic Commerce.
- Yonekura Jiro (1936). "Fukushu no hattatsu" [Fu-chou's development]. Chikyū (in Japanese). 26. OCLC 297304192.
- Yeh Kuo-ch'ing (1936). "Yeh pu-ts'ai chin Fu-chou shih pien" [The distinction between Nanking and past/present Foochow]. Yu Kung Pan-yueh-k'an (in Chinese). 6. OCLC 633548231.
- James E. Kirby, Jr. (1966). "The Foochow Anti-Missionary Riot, August 30, 1878". Journal of Asian Studies. 25.
- Osaki Fujio (1979). "Fukushu no zeimo" [Fu-chou's taxation business]. Shudo Shogaku (in Japanese). 20. OCLC 52817990.
- Fu I-ling (1982). "Ming Wan-li erh-shih-erh nien Fu-chou ti ch'iang mi feng ch'ao" [Rice riots in Fu-chou during twenty years of the Ming Wan-li era]. Nankai Hsueh Pao (in Chinese). 5. ISSN 0465-7942.
- Harriet T. Zurndorfer (1992). "Learning, Lineages, and Locality in Late Imperial China. A Comparative Study of Education in Huichow (Anhwei) and Foochow (Fukien) 1600-1800". Journal of the Economic and Social History of the Orient. 35.
- Jude Howell (1999). "Development Patterns and Strategies of Xiamen and Fuzhou". In Jae Ho Chung (ed.). Cities in Post-Mao China: Recipes for Economic Development in the Reform Era. Routledge.
