= Yangzhou massacre =

1645 mass killing of Chinese civilians by Manchu forces

Yangzhou Massacre
- Part of the Transition from Ming to Qing
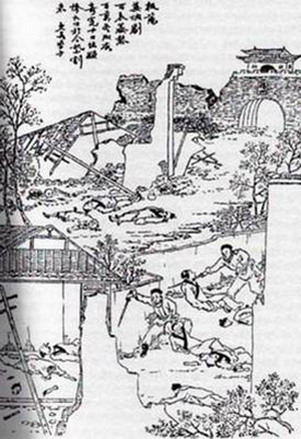
- An artist conception of the massacre from the late Qing dynasty
- Native name: 揚州十日
- Location: Yangzhou
- Date: 20 to 25~29 May 1645; 381 years ago
- Target: Civilians and Ming forces
- Attack type: Mass murder, looting and arson
- Deaths: 800,000 (likely exaggerated)
- Perpetrator: Qing forces (including Han Eight Banners) under Dodo
- Motive: Resistance efforts led by the Ming official Shi Kefa

Yangzhou Massacre
- Traditional Chinese: 揚州十日
- Simplified Chinese: 扬州十日
- Literal meaning: Ten Days of Yangzhou
Transcriptions
Standard Mandarin
- Hanyu Pinyin: Yángzhōu Shí Rì

The Yangzhou Massacre refers to the mass killing of people in Yangzhou, China, in May, 1645. Commanded by the Manchu prince Dodo, following the collapse of the Ming dynasty, Qing dynasty forces carried out the attack on the port city and its inhabitants, defended by remaining southern Ming forces. The massacre itself lasted a total of six days, which afterwards the burning of bodies continued. The Yangzhou Massacre served as a reminder to Ming loyalists of the threat to resisting Qing authority, and signals part of the transition from the Ming to the Qing.

== Primary accounts ==
The massacre is described in a contemporary account, A Record of Ten Days in Yangzhou, by Wang Xiuchu. Due to the title of the account, the events are often referred to as a ten-day massacre, but the diary shows that the slaughter was over by the sixth day, when burial of bodies commenced. According to Wang, the number of victims exceeded 800,000; that number is now disproven and considered by modern historians and researchers to be an extreme exaggeration.

Wang Xiuchu's account has appeared in a number of English translations, including by Backhouse and Bland, Lucien Mao, and Lynn A. Struve. Following are excerpts from the account in the translation by Struve.

Several dozen people were herded like sheep or goats. Any who lagged were flogged or killed outright. The women were bound together at the necks with a heavy rope—strung one to another like pearls. Stumbling with each step, they were covered with mud. Babies lay everywhere on the ground. The organs of those trampled like turf under horses' hooves or people's feet were smeared in the dirt, and the crying of those still alive filled the whole outdoors. Every gutter or pond we passed was stacked with corpses, pillowing each others arms and legs. Their blood had flowed into the water, and the combination of green and red was producing a spectrum of colours. The canals, too, had been filled to level with dead bodies.

Then fires started everywhere, and the thatched houses...caught fire and were soon engulfed in flames...Those who had hidden themselves beneath the houses were forced to rush out from the heat of the fire, and as soon as they came out, in nine cases out of ten, they were put to death on the spot. On the other hand, those who had stayed in the houses—were burned to death within the closely shuttered doors and no one could tell how many had died from the pile of charred bones that remained afterwards.

This account by Wang was not originally published during the Qing dynasty, but instead copies survived and made their way to Japan.

== Historical context ==
=== Fall of the Ming Dynasty ===
During the fall of the Ming dynasty, peasant leader Li Zicheng took the imperial capital of Beijing. At this time, as Li's peasant rebel army was advancing to the city, the last Ming emperor committed suicide as an alternative to being executed.Li sent a messenger to Ming general Wu Sangui demanding his submission, but Wu, outraged at Li's army looting Beijing and also Li threatening his family, decided to support the Manchu prince-regent Dorgon instead. He opened the gates of Shanhai Pass to allow the Manchus in, beginning the transition from the Ming dynasty to the Qing dynasty.

As the Qing dynasty fought Li Zicheng's peasant army, what remained of the Ming dynasty reestablished themselves in southern China as the Southern Ming, with Nanjing as the capital. After the Manchus emerged victorious, they pushed south towards the new capital, and the port city of Yangzhou fell under siege by May.

=== The fight over Yangzhou ===
Yangzhou was defended by the Southern Ming court's minister of war, Shi Kefa, who refused to submit to the new Qing authority. Manchu Prince Dodo "ordered his men to take Yangzhou whatever the cost", and according to primary sources, the fighting went on for six days. Qing and Ming soldiers and Yangzhou citizens alike were killed, citizens' homes burned with refugees inside, women raped and killed in the streets, and bodies burned in piles. The major defending commanders of the Ming, including Shi Kefa, were also executed by Qing forces.

The Yangzhou massacre served as punishment to the residents for the resistance efforts of the Ming, and warning to the rest of the population in Jiangnan of the consequences of participating in military activities and resisting the Qing invaders.

=== After the massacre ===
Qing soldiers ransomed women captured from Yangzhou back to their original husbands and fathers in Nanjing after Nanjing peacefully surrendered, corralling the women into the city and whipping them hard, with their hair containing a tag showing the price of the ransom.

Despite the devastating losses, the city of Yangzhou did recover fairly quickly as a significant port on the Yangxi River, and regained its prosperity by the late 17th century, even acting as a frequent stop by the Kangxi Emperor on his southern tours.

Books written about the massacres in Yangzhou, Jiading and Jiangyin were later republished by anti-Qing authors to win support in the lead up to the Taiping Rebellion and Xinhai Revolution. Accounts of atrocities like the Yangzhou massacre during the transition from the Ming to Qing were used by revolutionaries in the anti-Qing Xinhai revolution to fuel massacres against Manchus.

== See also ==
- Anti-Qing sentiment

== Literature ==
- Struve, Lynn A., Voices from the Ming-Qing Cataclysm: China in Tigers' Jaws, Publisher:Yale University Press, 1998, See pp. 32–48 for the translation of Wang Xiuchu's account.
- Finnane, Antonia, Speaking of Yangzhou: A Chinese City, 1550-1850, Cambridge: Harvard University Asia Center, 2004. See especially Chapter 4, "Yangzhou's Ten Days."
- Wei, Minghua 伟明铧, 1994. “Shuo Ýangzhou shiri’”说扬州十日, in Wei Minghua, Yangzhou tanpian 扬州谈片 Beijing: Sanlian shudian.
- Zarrow, Peter, 2004. “Historical Trauma: Anti-Manchuism and Memories of Atrocity in Late Qing China,” History and Memory, Vol. 16, No. 2, Special Issue: Traumatic Memory in Chinese History.
- The Litigation Master and the Monkey King, Liu, Ken. In The Paper Menagerie and other stories. Publisher:Saga Press, 2016, ISBN 978-1-4814-2437-0. pages 363–388.
