= King An of Zhou =

Zhou Dynasty king of China from 401 to 376 BC

King An of Zhou 周安王

King of the Zhou dynasty
- Reign: 401–376 BC
- Predecessor: King Weilie of Zhou
- Successor: King Lie of Zhou
- Died: 376 BC
- Issue: King Lie of Zhou; King Xian of Zhou
Names
- Ancestral name: Jī (姬); Given name: Jiāo (驕)
Posthumous name
- King An (安王) or King Yuan'an (元安王)
- House: Ji
- Dynasty: Zhou (Eastern Zhou)
- Father: King Weilie of Zhou

King An of Zhou

Posthumous name
- Chinese: 周安王
- Literal meaning: The Peaceful King of Zhou
Transcriptions
Standard Mandarin
- Hanyu Pinyin: Zhōu Ān Wáng
- Wade–Giles: Chou Ān-wang; King Ān of Chou

King An of Zhou (Chinese: 周安王; pinyin: Zhōu Ān Wáng), personal name Ji Jiao, was the 33rd king of the Chinese Zhou dynasty.

He succeeded his father King Weilie to the Eastern Zhou throne in 401 BC and reigned until his death in 376 BC. After he died, the throne passed to his son, King Lie. His other son was King Xian.

== Family ==
Sons:

- Prince Xi (王子喜; d. 369 BC), ruled as King Lie of Zhou from 375–369 BC
- Prince Bian (王子扁; d. 321 BC), ruled as King Xian of Zhou from 368–321 BC

== See also ==
Family tree of ancient Chinese emperors

King An of Zhou Zhou dynasty Died: 376 BC
Regnal titles
Preceded by King Weilie of Zhou	King of China; 401–376 BC	Succeeded by King Lie of Zhou
