= King Xian of Zhou =

Zhou Dynasty king of China from 368 to 321 BC

King Xian of Zhou 周顯王

King of the Zhou dynasty
- Reign: 368–321 BC
- Predecessor: King Lie of Zhou
- Successor: King Shenjing of Zhou
- Died: 321 BC
- Issue: King Shenjing of Zhou
Names
- Ancestral name: Jī (姬); Given name: Biǎn (扁)
Posthumous name
- King Xian (顯王) or King Xiansheng (顯聖王) or King Xiansheng (顯聲王)
- House: Ji
- Dynasty: Zhou (Eastern Zhou)
- Father: King An of Zhou

King Xian of Zhou (Chinese: 周顯王; pinyin: Zhōu Xiǎn Wáng), personal name Ji Bian, was the 35th king of the Chinese Zhou dynasty.

Very little is known about him. He succeeded his brother King Lie in 368 BC and ruled until his death in 321 BC.

He sent gifts to many of the feudal states, supposedly his vassals, particularly the Qin and Chu states. Late in his reign, the rulers of the states declared themselves kings, and ceased to recognise the king of Zhou as even nominally their overlord.

After his death, he was succeeded by his son, King Shenjing.

== Family ==
Sons:

- Prince Ding (王子定; d. 315 BC), ruled as King Shenjing of Zhou from 320–315 BC

== See also ==
Family tree of ancient Chinese emperors

== Notes ==
King Xian of Zhou Zhou dynasty Died: 321 BC
Regnal titles
Preceded by King Lie of Zhou	King of China; 368–321 BC	Succeeded by King Shenjing of Zhou
