= King Lie of Zhou =

Zhou Dynasty king of China from 375 to 369 BC

King Lie of Zhou 周烈王

King of the Zhou dynasty
- Reign: 375–369 BC
- Predecessor: King An of Zhou
- Successor: King Xian of Zhou
- Died: 369 BC
Names
- Ancestral name: Jī (姬); Given name: Xǐ (喜)
Posthumous name
- King Lie (烈王) or King Yilie (夷烈王)
- House: Ji
- Dynasty: Zhou (Eastern Zhou)
- Father: King An of Zhou

King Lie of Zhou

Posthumous name
- Chinese: 周烈王
- Literal meaning: The Strong King of Zhou
Transcriptions
Standard Mandarin
- Hanyu Pinyin: Zhōu Liè Wáng
- Wade–Giles: Chou Liè-wang; King Liè of Chou

King Lie of Zhou (Chinese: 周烈王; pinyin: Zhōu Liè Wáng), personal name Ji Xi, was the 34th king of the Chinese Zhou dynasty. He reigned from 375 BC to his death in 369 BC. His father was King An.

During the reign of King Lie of Zhou, Duke Xian of Qin relocated the capital to Yueyang (in present-day Yanliang District of Xi'an), which marked the start of Qin's prosperity. In 371 BC, Duke Xian of Qin led troops to conquer six cities of the Han state. In 370 BC, King Wei of Qi visited the Zhou court, further solidifying his reputation.

== See also ==
- Family tree of ancient Chinese emperors

King Lie of Zhou Zhou dynasty Died: 369 BC
Regnal titles
Preceded by King An of Zhou	King of China; 375–369 BC	Succeeded by King Xian of Zhou
