= Consort Jiang =

Consort Jiang may refer to:

== Zhou dynasty ==
Most of the consorts of the Zhou dynasty kings were from the Jiang clan.

- Yi Jiang (fl. 11th century BC), queen consort of King Wu of Zhou
- Wang Jiang (queen) (fl. 10th century BC), queen consort of King Kang of Zhou
- Wang Zu Jiang (fl. 10th century BC), queen consort of King Mu of Zhou
- Wang Bo Jiang (fl. 10th or 9th century BC), queen consort of King Yih of Zhou
- Shen Jiang (queen) (fl. 9th century BC), queen consort of King Li of Zhou
- Queen Jiang (King Xuan of Zhou) (fl. 9th or 8th century BC), queen consort of King Xuan of Zhou
- Queen Shen (fl. 8th century BC), surname Jiang, first queen consort of King You of Zhou
- Xuan Jiang (730–690 BC), duchess consort of Duke Xuan of Wey
- Wen Jiang (died 673 BC), duchess consort of Duke Huan of Lu
- Queen Jiang (King Ding of Zhou) (fl. 7th or 6th century BC), queen consort of King Ding of Zhou
- Queen Jiang (King Ling of Zhou) (fl. 6th century BC), queen consort of King Ling of Zhou
- Mu Jiang (621–564 BC), duchess consort of Duke Xian of Lu
- Zhen Jiang (fl. 6th or 5th century BC), queen consort of King Zhao of Chu

== Liu Song dynasty ==
- Jiang Jiangui (fl. 470s), wife of Emperor Houfei of Liu Song

== Fictional characters ==
- Queen Jiang (character), fictional wife of Di Xin
- Jiang Caipin, likely fictional concubine of Emperor Xuanzong of Tang
