= Qiu Wei (Western Zhou) =

Zhou dynasty aristocrat

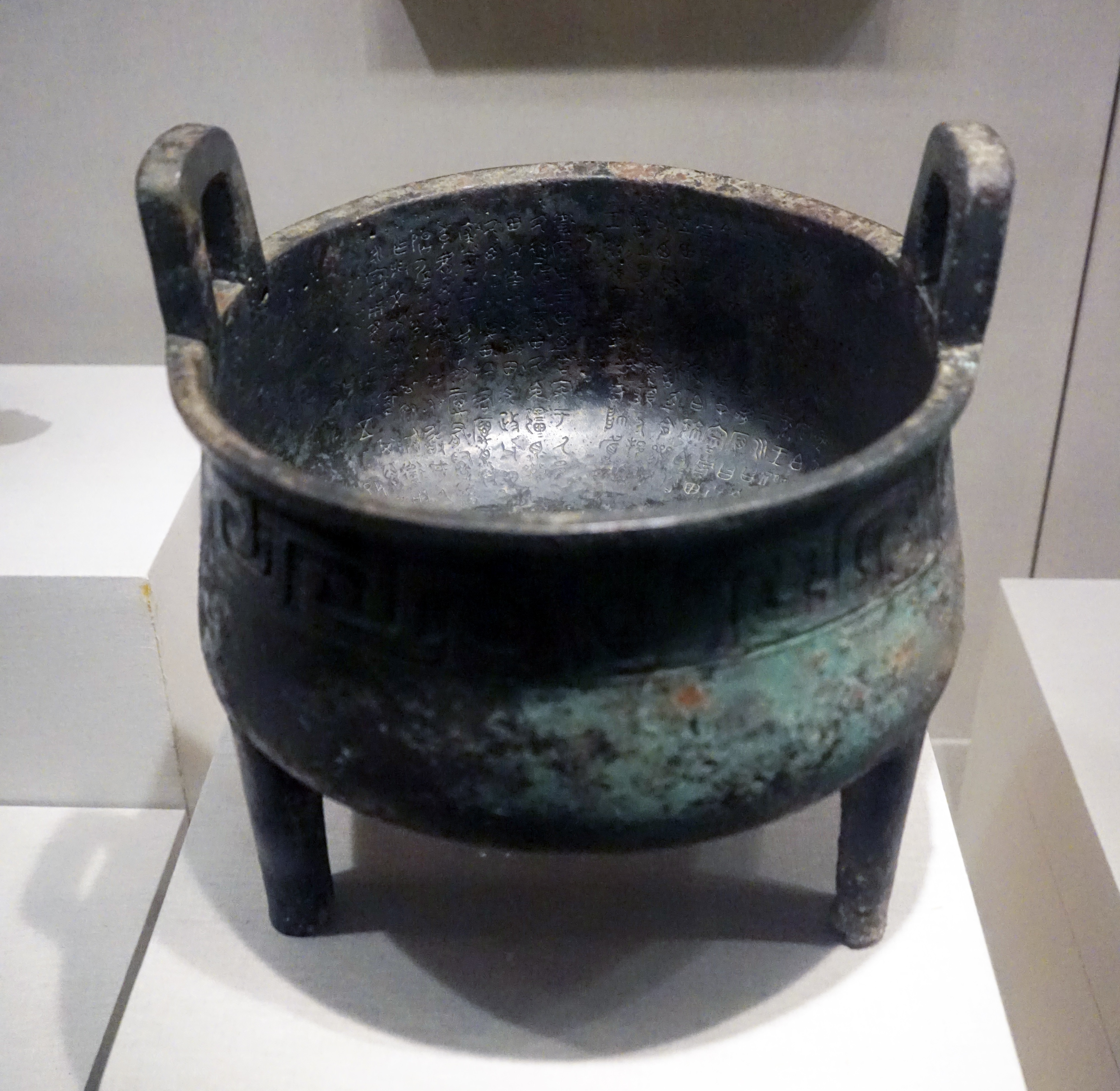
- The Fifth-year Wei ding, which details a land transaction.
- Born: Western Zhou
- Occupation: Fur salesman
- Father: Hui Meng (惠孟)

Chinese name
- Traditional Chinese: 裘衛
- Simplified Chinese: 裘卫
Transcriptions
Standard Mandarin
- Hanyu Pinyin: qiú wèi

Qiu Wei was a Zhou dynasty aristocrat who lived during the reigns of King Mu of Zhou and King Gong of Zhou. He is known for his appearance on various Chinese bronze inscriptions, which detail him making his fortune by trading prestige goods, such as leather, fabrics, chariots, and land, providing key insights into Zhou life.

== Periodisation ==
Qiu Wei's name is featured on four bronzes, known conventionally as "Qiu Wei's Four Tools" (裘衛四器):

- Qiu Wei he (裘衛盉, 集成 9456)
- Fifth-year Wei ding (五祀衛鼎, 集成 2832)
- Ninth-year Wei ding (九年衛鼎, 集成 2831)
- Twenty-seventh-year Wei gui (廿七年衛簋, 集成 4256)

Each of these tools was unearthed in the same cache in 1975, in Dongjiacun (董家村) in Qishan County, Shaanxi.

The periodisation of the four tools is somewhat unclear. The Fifth-year Wei ding specifically notes King Gong of Zhou, but his reign did not reach 27 years according to any Chinese classics, and this has not been contested by excavated texts either. Shaughnessy therefore surmises that the Twenty-seventh-year gui must be from the middle years of King Mu of Zhou, making it the earliest of the bronzes. However, as King Mu reigned for around 55 years, this would place the bronze unusually far away from the rest; therefore, this could be evidence of King Gong living for longer than the classics suggest.

== Life ==
Qiu Wei was born into a seemingly prominent family. He was filial towards his father, Hui Meng (惠孟), and engaged in fur trade, eventually building his way towards land sales supervised by nobility from various polities. He would store the bronzes cast to honour his larger trades in a family shrine. Robert Eno notes that the fact the Zhou ruler does not oversee the trade is a possible sign of the decline of the royal house.

Assuming the Twenty-seventh-year Wei gui was from the reign of King Mu, the earliest record of Qiu Wei shows him being presented with regalia with supervision from an Earl of Nan (南伯). The king then presented him with a leather apron (緇芾), a vermillion sash (朱衡), and luan bells (鑾). Qiu Wei then kowtowed and inscribed a message on the gui for his descendants to honour the event.

The Qiu Wei he details a Duke of Bo (矩伯) taking a jade jinzhang (堇章) from Qiu Wei, which was valued at eight peng, a kind of stringed cowrie shell. The Duke of Bo then gave Qiu Wei ten fields in return. Qiu Wei then reported the trade to a Father Boyi (伯邑父), Earl of Rong (荣伯), Earl of Ding (定伯), Earl of Ke (亮伯), and Earl of Dan (单伯). He then reported the deal to the Minister of Works, Wei Yi (司徒微邑), the Minister of Works, Shan Yu (司馬單舆), and the Minister of Works, Fu of Yi (司工邑人服). He then had a feast and produced the Qiu Wei he in honour of his father.

The Fifth-year Wei ding details Qiu Wei meeting with the Earl of Jing (丼伯), Father Boyi (伯邑父), the Earl of Ding (定伯), the Earl of Qing (黥伯), and Father Bosu (伯俗父), who appeared on behalf of Bangjun Li (邦君厲). Bangjun Li had been commissioned by King Gong of Zhou to improve the embankments on two rivers east of the Shao Great Hall (卲大室). Qiu Wei then asked if the feudal lords would sell the five fields offered before, to which they nodded. They then ratify the agreement with the Minister of Land, a man of the Baiyue (司土邑人越); the Minister of War, Bang, a marriage-person (司馬婚人邦); the minister of works, Chui Ju (司工陲矩); and the tax minister Yousi Chu (內史友寺芻), who then transfer the myriad fields. They also ceded residences in Qiu Wei's settlement: Their northern boundary adjoined Bangjun Li's field; their eastern boundary adjoined the fields of San (散田); their southern boundary adjoined the fields of San and Zheng (政); their western boundary adjoined Li's field. Bangjun Li then delivered the fields to Qiu Wei in the presence of the aforementioned representatives. Wei's retainers welcomed them and held a feast. Qiu WEi therefore cast and inscribed the Ding, wishing his descendants to treasure it.

The Ninth-year Wei ding is more complicated than the earlier Qiu Wei land texts. Its opening places the event at the Ju Palace (周駒宮), where the king receives Mei Ao (眉敖), a possible Chu minister, and holds a sacrifice for them. The inscription then turns to a transaction in which Ju (矩) acquires a richly equipped chariot and other prestige goods from Qiu Wei and hands over to him the Linzi district (林𬁪里) and the Yan forest (顏林). Qiu Wei also gives gifts to several Yan figures, and the land is formally walked and demarcated with four boundary markers before the handover is completed. Li Feng, following Itō Michiharu, argues that the Yan group in the inscription may represent the administrative body attached to Linzi rather than a second seller, which would explain why they receive gifts during the transaction and take part in marking the boundaries.
