= Gong of Zhou =

Gong of Zhou may refer to:

- Duke of Zhou (Chinese: 周公; pinyin: Zhōu Gōng; lit. 'Gong of Zhou', fl. 11th century BC)
- King Gong of Zhou (died 900 BC)
- Emperor Gong of Zhou (953–973) or Emperor Gong of Later Zhou
