= King Xiao of Zhou =

King of Zhou Dynasty China

King Xiao of Zhou 周孝王

King of the Zhou dynasty
- Reign: 891–886 BC
- Predecessor: King Yì of Zhou
- Successor: King Yí of Zhou
- Born: Ji Bifang
- Died: 886 BC
- Spouse: Wang Jing
Names
- Ancestral name: Ji (姬); Given name: Bifang (辟方)
Posthumous name
- King Xiao (孝王) or King Kao (考王)
- House: Ji
- Dynasty: Zhou (Western Zhou)
- Father: King Mu of Zhou

King Xiao of Zhou

Posthumous name
- Chinese: 周孝王
- Literal meaning: The Filial King of Zhou
Transcriptions
Standard Mandarin
- Hanyu Pinyin: Zhōu Xiao Wáng
- Wade–Giles: Chou Xiao-wang; King Xiao of Chou

King Xiao of Zhou (Chinese: 周孝王; pinyin: Zhōu Xìao Wáng), personal name Ji Bifang, was the eighth king of the Chinese Zhou dynasty. Estimated dates of his reign are 891–886 BC or 872–866 BC. He was a son of King Mu and brother of King Gong.

King Xiao was preceded by his nephew King Yì of Zhou and followed by his nephew's son, King Yí of Zhou. Sima Qian wrote that the King Yí was "restored by the many lords". This hints at a usurpation, but the matter is not clear.

== Reign ==
The Bamboo Annals state that upon ascending the throne, King Xiao immediately ordered the Marquis of Shen (申侯) to attack the Xirong. This seems to have resulted in successful hegemony, as five years later, they presented horses as tribute. Two years later, King Xiao would see the River Yangtze and Han River flood. Another two years later, cultivation of cattle through shepherds began.

Feizi was granted a small fief at Qin by King Xiao. King Xiao learned of his reputation and put him in charge of breeding and training horses for the Zhou army. To reward his contributions, King Xiao wanted to make Feizi his father's legal heir instead of his half-brother Cheng.

== Family ==
Queens:

- Wang Jing (王京)

== See also ==
- Family tree of Chinese monarchs (ancient)

== Sources ==
King Xiao of Zhou Zhou dynasty Died: 886 BC
Regnal titles
Preceded by King Yì of Zhou	King of China; 891–886 BC	Succeeded by King Yí of Zhou
