= King Yi of Zhou (Xie) =

9th century BC Chinese king

King Yi of Zhou 周夷王

King of the Zhou dynasty
- Reign: 885–878 BC
- Predecessor: King Xiao of Zhou
- Successor: King Li of Zhou
- Died: 878 BC
- Spouse: Wang Ji
- Issue: King Li of Zhou
Names
- Ancestral name: Jī (姬); Given name: Xiè (燮)
Posthumous name
- King Yi (夷王)
- House: Ji
- Dynasty: Zhou (Western Zhou)
- Father: King Yì of Zhou
- Mother: Wang Bo Jiang

King Yi of Zhou

Posthumous name
- Chinese: 周夷王
- Literal meaning: The Barbaric King of Zhou; The Razing King of Zhou
Transcriptions
Standard Mandarin
- Hanyu Pinyin: Zhōu Yí Wáng
- Wade–Giles: Chou Yí-wang; King Yí of Chou

King Yi of Zhou (Chinese: 周夷王; pinyin: Zhōu Yí Wáng), personal name Ji Xie, was the ninth king of China's Zhou dynasty. Estimated dates of his reign are 885–878 BC or 865–858 BC.

== Reign ==
King Yi was preceded by his great-uncle, King Xiao, who may have overthrown his father. In his second year, King Yi accepted jadeware from the people of Ba and Lü, and used it in ceremony. In the next year, King Yi sided with Marquis of Ji in a dispute with Duke Ai of Qi and executed Duke Ai by boiling him to death in a large cauldron. King Yi installed Duke Ai's younger half-brother Lü Jing (Duke Hu of Qi) on the Qi throne. During his sixth year, he went to She Lin (社林) to hunt, and returned with a captured rhinoceros.

During his reign there were wars in the south with the Chu state and the Dongyi. According to the Records of the Grand Historian, during his reign the royal power was not strong and the regional rulers failed to pay obeisance to the Zhou royal court.

During a bout of illness, feudal lords paid sacrifices to him at mountains and rivers in hopes of his recovery. However, he died nevertheless, and was succeeded by his son, King Li.

== Family ==
Queens:

- Wang Ji, of the Ji clan of E (王姞 姞姓), a princess of E by birth; the mother of Crown Prince Hu

Sons:

- Crown Prince Hu (太子胡; 890–828 BC), ruled as King Li of Zhou from 877 to 828 BC

== See also ==
- Family tree of Chinese monarchs (ancient)

King Yi of Zhou (Xie) Zhou dynasty Died: 878 BC
Regnal titles
Preceded by King Xiao of Zhou	King of China; 885–878 BC	Succeeded by King Li of Zhou
