= King Yih of Zhou =

King of China

King Yi of Zhou 周懿王
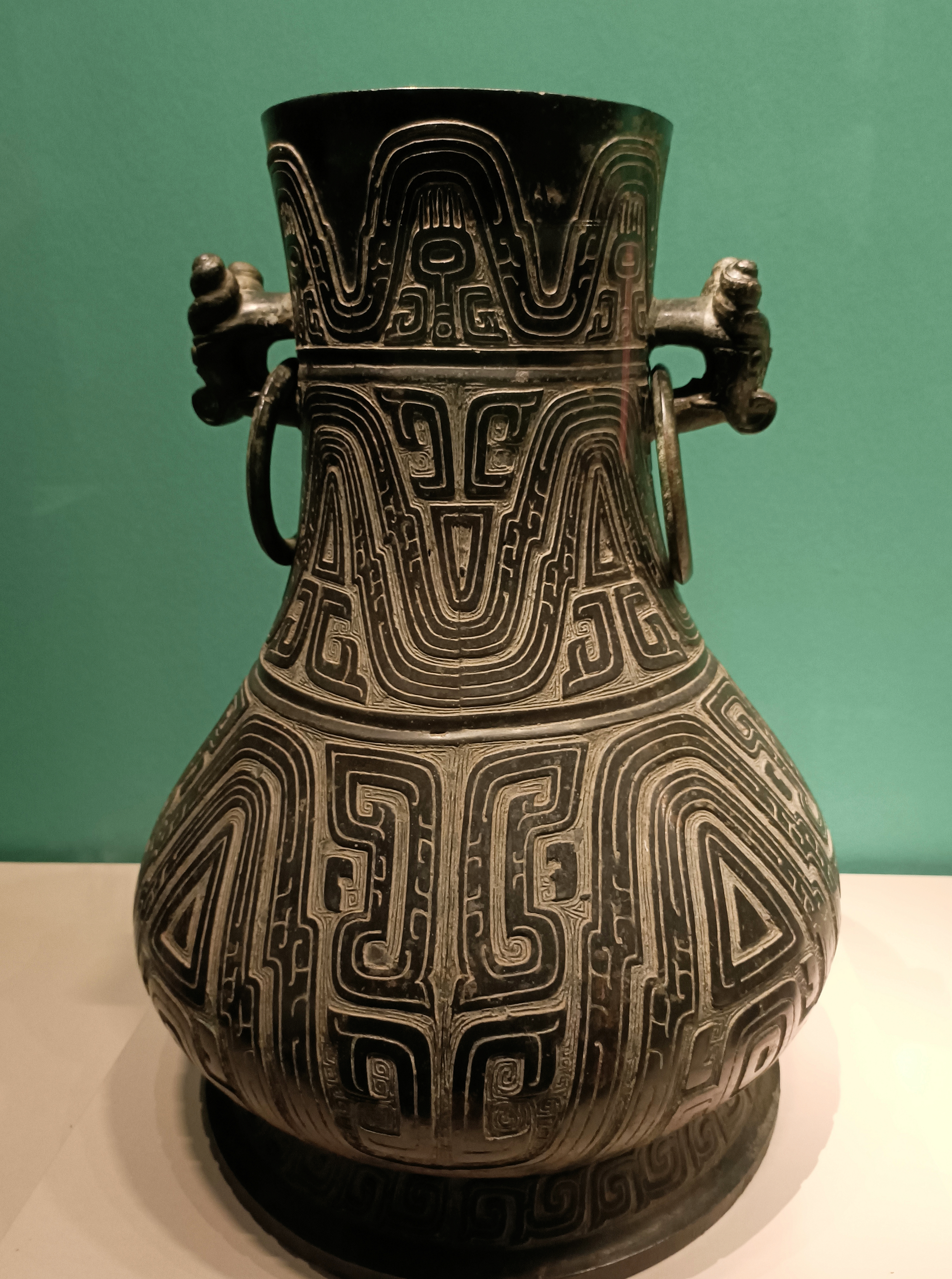
- Contemporary bronze pot dated to his third year. Western Zhou dynasty, in Baoji Zhouyuan Museum.

King of the Zhou dynasty
- Reign: 899–892 BC
- Predecessor: King Gong of Zhou
- Successor: King Xiao of Zhou
- Died: 892 BC
- Spouse: Wang Bo Jiang
- Issue: King Yí of Zhou
Names
- Ancestral name: Jī (姬); Given name: Jiān (囏)
Posthumous name
- King Yi (懿王)
- House: Ji
- Dynasty: Zhou (Western Zhou)
- Father: King Gong of Zhou

King Yih of Zhou

Posthumous name
- Chinese: 周懿王
- Literal meaning: The Honourable King of Zhou; The Righteous King of Zhou
Transcriptions
Standard Mandarin
- Hanyu Pinyin: Zhōu Yi Wáng
- Wade–Giles: Chou Yi-wang; King Yi of Chou

King Yi of Zhou (Chinese: 周懿王; pinyin: Zhōu Yì Wáng), personal name Ji Jian, was the seventh king of the Chinese Zhou dynasty. Estimated dates of his reign are 899–892 BC or 899–873 BC.

== Reign ==
King Yi's reign is poorly documented. The first year of his reign is confirmed by a solar eclipse on April 21, 899. He succeeded his uncle King Xiao, who was in turn succeeded by King Yi's son King Yí, who was "restored by the many lords". The Bamboo Annals state that he moved from the capital Zongzhou (宗周) to a locality called Huaili. This hints that he was removed from power by his uncle, but the matter is uncertain. Yi's grandson was King Li of Zhou. Sima Qian records that there was a period of decline that prompted poets to satirize his reign.

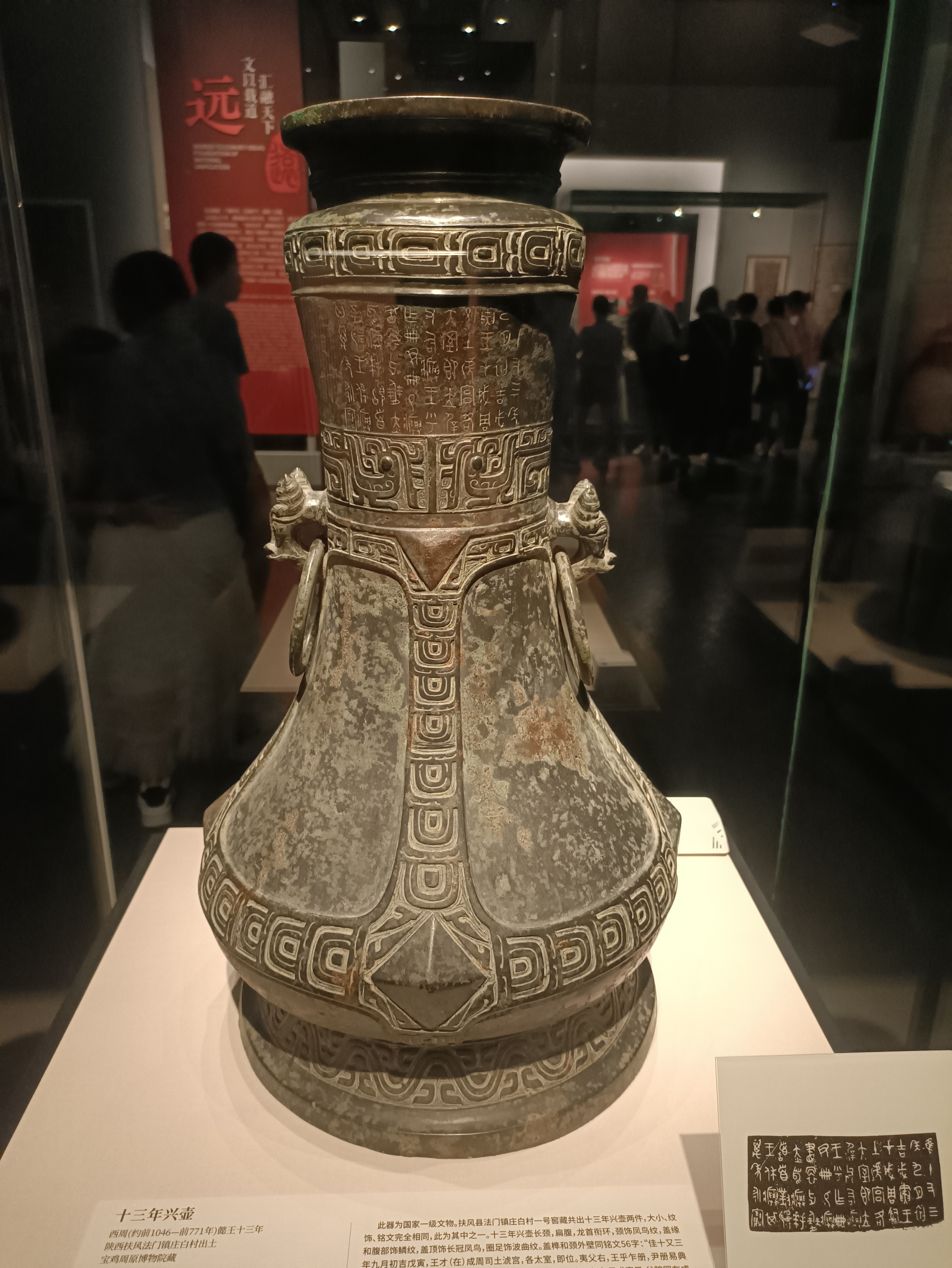
Bronze Pot of the Thirteenth Year of King Yi Era (886 BCE), Western Zhou dynasty. Fufeng County, Shaanxi Province. Baoji Zhouyuan Museum

A collection of pots from the thirteenth year of his reign describe him giving an imperial edict in the Situlǜ Palace (司土滤宫) in Chengzhou (成周), which was recorded by Yi Dian (易典), to Ya Bo (牙僰), Chi Xi (赤舄), and others unnamed, who kowtowed in response.

== Family ==
Queens:

- Wang Bo Jiang, of the Jiang clan (王伯姜 姜姓), the mother of Crown Prince Xie and a daughter

Sons:

- Crown Prince Xie (太子燮; d. 878 BC), ruled as King Yí of Zhou from 885 to 878 BC

== See also ==
- Family tree of Chinese monarchs (ancient)

== Sources ==
King Yih of Zhou Zhou dynasty Died: 892 BC
Regnal titles
| Preceded by King Gong of Zhou | King of China; 899–892 BC | Succeeded by King Xiao of Zhou |
