= Western Zhou =

Dynastic era in China (c. 1046 – 771 BC)

The Western Zhou (Chinese: 西周; pinyin: Xīzhōu; c. 1046 – 771 BC) was a period of Chinese history corresponding roughly to the first half of the Zhou dynasty. It began in 1046 BC when King Wu of Zhou overthrew the Shang dynasty and ended in 771 BC when Quanrong mercenaries hired by the rebel Marquis of Shen sacked the Zhou capital Fenghao (which consisted of the twin cities Fengjing and Haojing) and killed King You of Zhou. The "Western" label for the period is a retronym referring to the relative location of the ruined Fenghao in the Wei River valley (near present-day Xi'an, Shaanxi province), which is about 340 km (210 miles) west of the subsequent new capital Luoyi (also known as Chengzhou, present-day Luoyang, Henan province) at the Lower Luo River valley, which had previously served as Zhou's secondary capital.

After exploiting the opportunity of the Shang dynasty's main forces being away on an expedition against the Dongyi, the earlier Zhou state (Note: "...these early states are best known from archaeology and history to have been ruled by the dynastic houses such as that of Shang (1554–1046 BC) and of Western Zhou (1045–771 BC). Therefore, they can be called the early 'royal states'.") under Ji Fa allied with other ancient Chinese states and rebelled against King Zhòu of Shang, defeating King Zhòu's hastily conscripted army of slaves and penal troops (who defected immediately) at the Battle of Muye. The Zhou state then became ascendant as the new universal suzerain of the Huaxia federacy for about 70 years until the disastrous Zhou–Chu War in 977 BC; thereafter, the Zhou court gradually declined in power and lost authority over its vassal states, which culminated in an aristocrat insurgency in 841 BC that forced King Li into exile and subsequently began a 14-year period of regency by nobles. The Zhou dynasty had a brief resurgence under King Li's son King Xuan, who scored a series of successful campaigns against the Four Barbarians, but suffered crushing defeats against the Xirong, particularly in 789 BC against the western Shen state (not to be confused with similarly named Shen state, which was a cadet state established in 821 BC at present-day Nanyang, Henan, also known as the "Southern Shen") where King Xuan's priced "southern division" was annihilated. To pacify the Shen state, King Xuan's son King You married the daughter of Marquis of Shen and named their son Yijiu as the crown prince. However, King You later favored a different consort Bao Si and attempted to replace Yijiu with Bao Si's son Bofu as the heir apparent. That enraged the Marquis of Shen, who rebelled in collaboration with another state Zeng and the Quanrong barbarians and defeated King You's royal forces at the Battle of Mount Li in 771 BC, killing King You in the process. The rebels then sieged and sacked the Zhou capital Fenghao, killing Bofu and Situ Duke Huan of Zheng and abducting Bao Si, thus ending the Western Zhou dynasty.

With the old capital ruined and the crown lands overrun by Quanrong invaders, the Zhou court under Yijiu (who became King Ping but was nothing more than a puppet ruler under his maternal grandfather) was forced to evacuate the Wei River valley and relocate east to Luoyi. This marked the beginning of the Eastern Zhou period, wherein central authority had been irreversibly eroded and Zhou politics became dominated by the ambitions of the now-autonomous vassals.

== Sources ==
The Western Zhou are known from archaeological finds, including substantial inscriptions, mostly on bronze ritual vessels. In contrast to earlier periods, this direct evidence can be usefully compared with texts transmitted through the manuscript tradition. These include some Confucian classics, the oldest parts of which are thought to date from this period. Texts from the Warring States period and Han dynasty provide fuller accounts, though further removed from the original events.

=== Archaeology ===
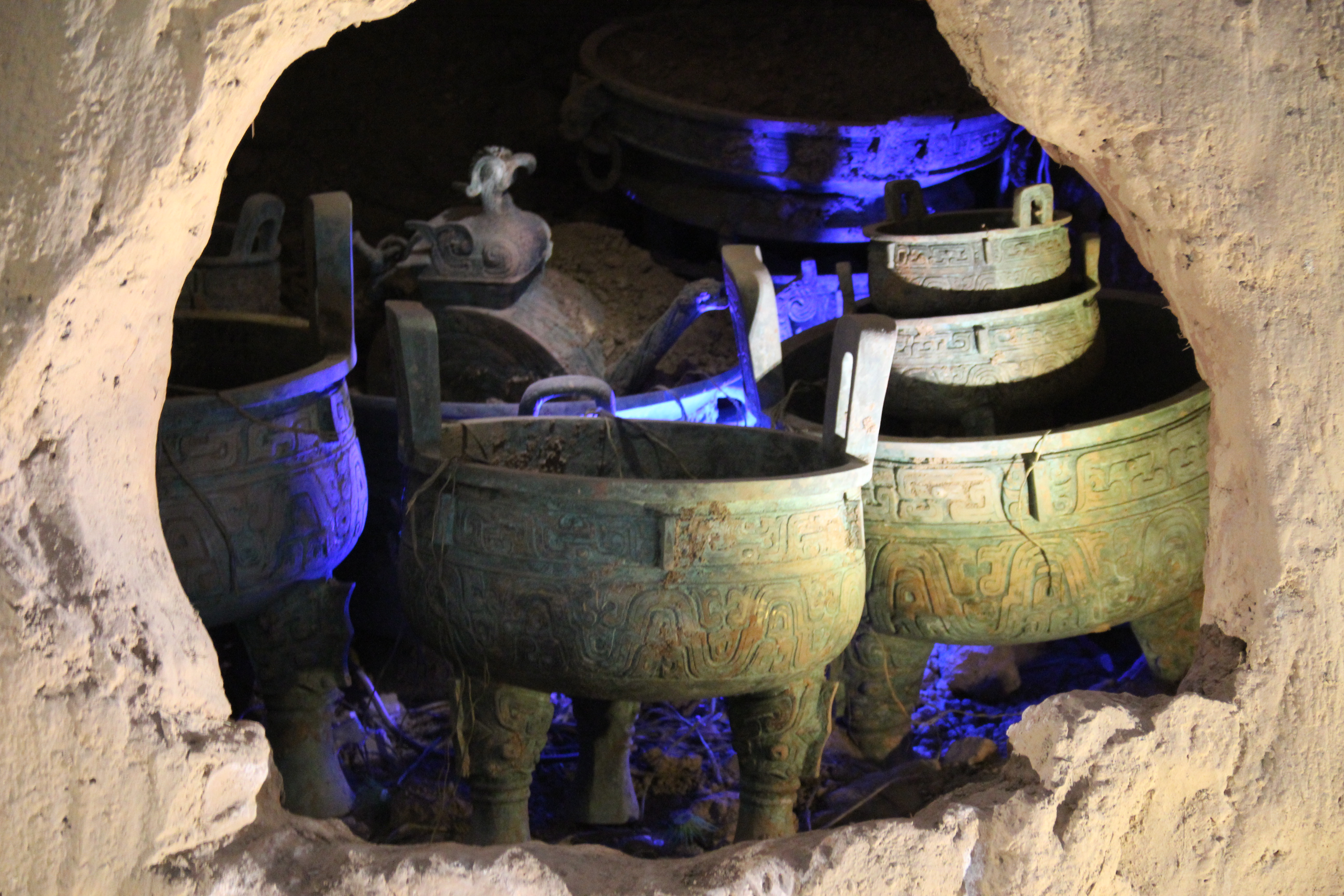
Reconstruction of a hoard found in Shaanxi

Zhou ritual bronzes have been collected since the Song dynasty and are now scattered in collections around the world. Scientific excavations began in the core Wei River valley and the Luoyang areas in the 1930s and expanded to a broader area from the 1980s. Bronze vessels are a key marker of Western Zhou sites, including buildings, workshops, city walls and burials. Elite burials usually contain sets of vessels, which can be dated using known variations in styles, as well as the paleography and content of inscriptions. Hundreds of hoards of bronzes have been found in Shaanxi, dating from the fall of the western capital in 771 BC. A hoard typically contains treasured vessels accumulated by a family over three centuries, carefully buried to hide them from the invaders.

=== Inscriptions ===
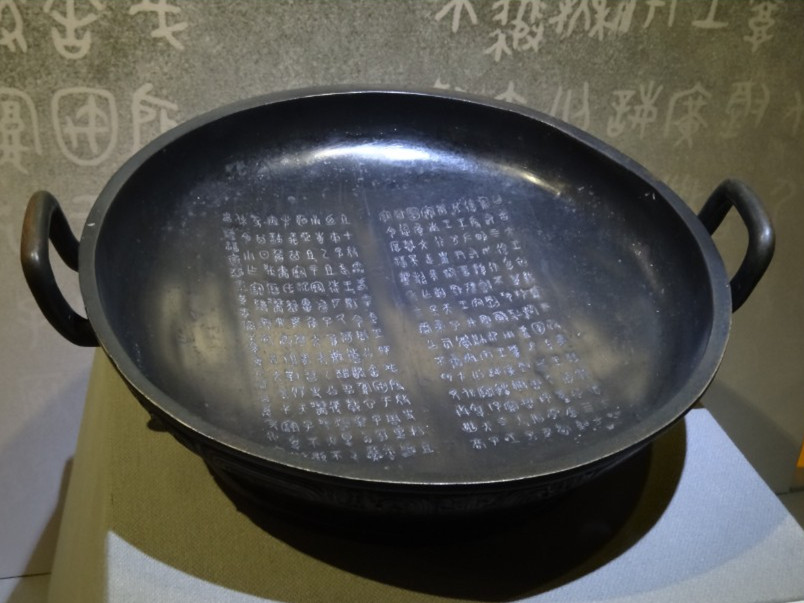
The Shi Qiang pan, from the reign of King Gong, bears an inscription with a brief account from King Wen to the time of the vessel.

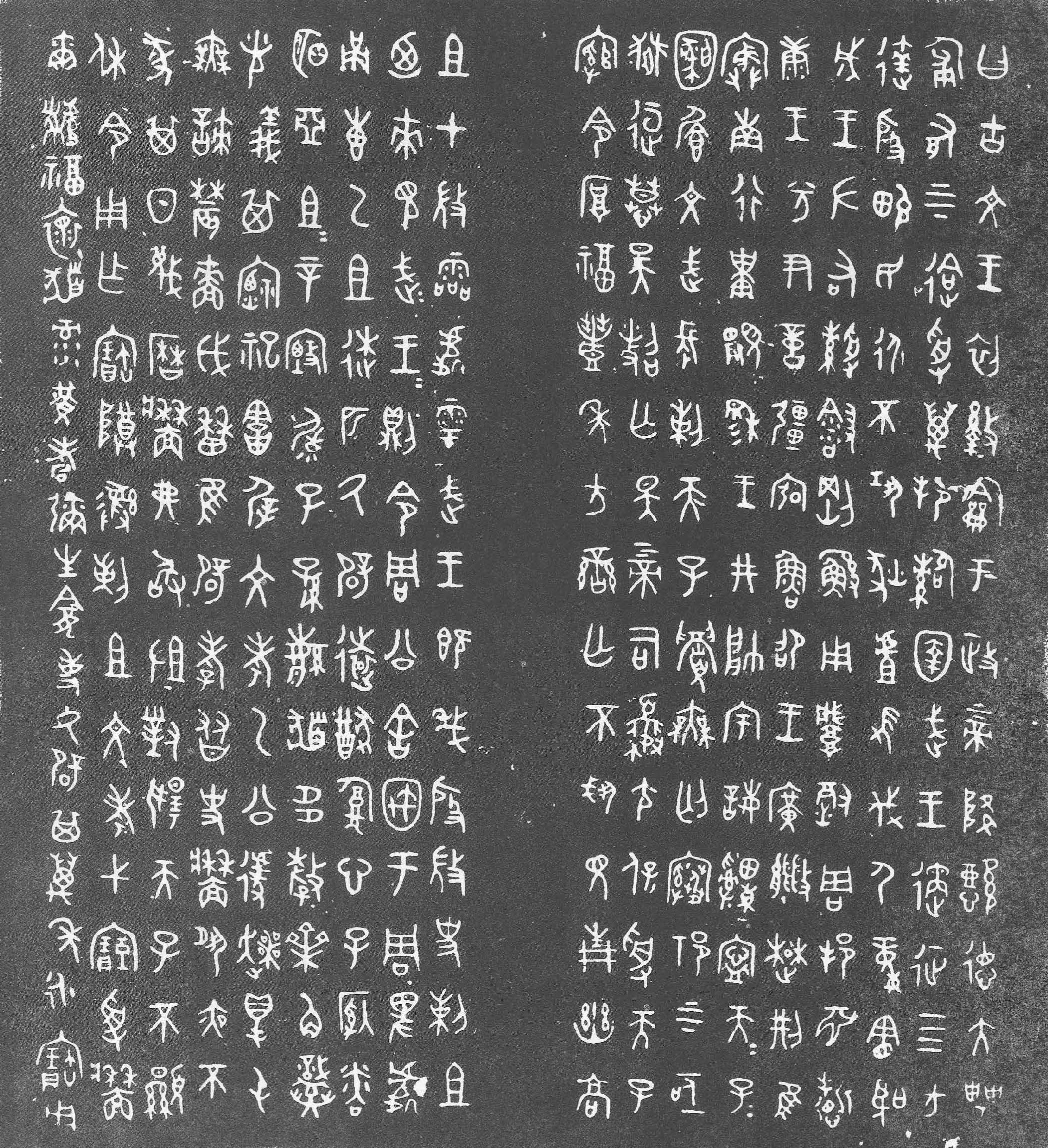
Rubbing of the inscription on the Shi Qiang pan

The Zhou produced thousands of inscriptions, mostly on bronze ritual vessels and often considerably longer than those of the Late Shang. Early inscriptions are quite short. The length of texts gradually increased until the middle of the Western Zhou period and remained fairly consistent thereafter. The character forms and language of these inscriptions are obscure, and their interpretation rests heavily on transmitted texts.

A vessel was typically cast for some member of the Zhou elite, recording a relevant event or an honour bestowed on the owner by the king. In the latter case, the inscription might include a narrative of the ceremony and report the speech of participants. These give a rich insight into Zhou governance and the upper levels of Zhou society.

Many inscriptions contain details that may be compared with later histories. More than a hundred of them commemorate a royal appointment to some government position. More than 50 of them describe military campaigns. Naturally the picture is incomplete, as very few inscriptions touch on military defeats or failures of government. As the Book of Rites says of these inscriptions, "The intention of the inscriber is to extol the beautiful and not to extol the ugly."

Inscriptions usually contain some dating information, but usually not the name of the current king. Scholars have devised a range of criteria to narrow down the reign of an inscription, including the style of the vessel, the form of the characters and details within the text.

=== Classics ===
The earliest received texts, including parts of the Book of Odes and the Book of Documents, are believed to date from the Western Zhou period.

The Book of Odes is a collection of songs, traditionally divided into 160 State Airs, 105 Court Songs (Major and Minor) and 40 Hymns (Zhou, Lu and Song), set to melodies that have since been lost. Most specialists agree that the Zhou Hymns date to the Western Zhou, followed by the Court Songs and the Airs of the States. The Airs are said to have been collected from throughout the Western Zhou domains, but have a consistency and elegance that suggests that they were polished by the literati of the Zhou court.

The Book of Documents is a collection of formal speeches presented as spanning two millennia from the legendary Three Sovereigns and Five Emperors to the Spring and Autumn period. Most scholars agree that the "Old Script" chapters are post-Han forgeries, and that many of the remaining "Modern Script" chapters were written long after the periods they purport to represent. The five "announcement" (or "proclamation") chapters use the most archaic language, similar to that of bronze inscriptions, and are thought to have been recorded close to the events of the early Western Zhou reigns they describe. However, they feature significant differences in vocabulary, grammar and outlook from bronze inscriptions dated to that period, and may date from the middle or late Western Zhou. Four more chapters, "Catalpa Timbers", "Many Officers", "Take No Ease" and "Many Regions", are set in the same period, but their language suggests that they were written late in the Western Zhou period. The prefaces written for each chapter, tying the Documents together as a continuous narrative, are thought to have been written in the Western Han period.

=== Early histories ===
Texts transmitted from the Warring States period relate traditions from the Western Zhou period. The "Discourses of Zhou" chapter of the Guoyu includes speeches claimed to be from the time of King Mu onward. The Zuo Zhuan is primarily concerned with the Spring and Autumn period, but contains many references to events in the preceding Western Zhou period.

The Bamboo Annals provides a wealth of detail, often varying from other sources, but its transmission history presents many problems. The original text was a chronicle of the state of Wei buried in a royal tomb in the early 3rd century BC and recovered in the late 3rd century AD, but lost before the Song dynasty. Two versions exist today: an "ancient text" assembled from quotations in other works and a fuller "current text" that Qian Daxin pronounced a forgery but some scholars believe contains authentic material.

The standard account is found in the "Basic Annals of Zhou", chapter 4 of the Historical Records compiled by the Han dynasty historian Sima Qian. This account is a synthesis of earlier sources, relying most heavily on the Book of Documents for the early kings and the Guoyu for early ancestors and the middle and late Western Zhou period. Sima Qian's depiction of the entire Zhou dynasty as eight centuries of decline from its idealized founders has shaped views of the dynasty from his time until the present day.

== Wei River valley ==
The Wei River valley and surrounding areas

The valley of the Wei River was the homeland of the Zhou before their conquest of the Shang, and remained the political centre and directly-ruled royal domain throughout the Western Zhou period. It also contains the vast majority of archaeological finds from the period.

The valley is a graben formed in the Cenozoic era as part of the Fen–Wei Rift System. It is bounded on the south by the Qinling Mountains and on the west by the Liupan Mountains. To the north lies the Loess Plateau, into which the northern tributaries of the Wei have carved deep valleys. The valley is broad, with fertile soil, abundant rainfall and ground water from the Loess Plateau and Qinling Mountains. The areas to the west and north are much drier and less suited to agriculture.

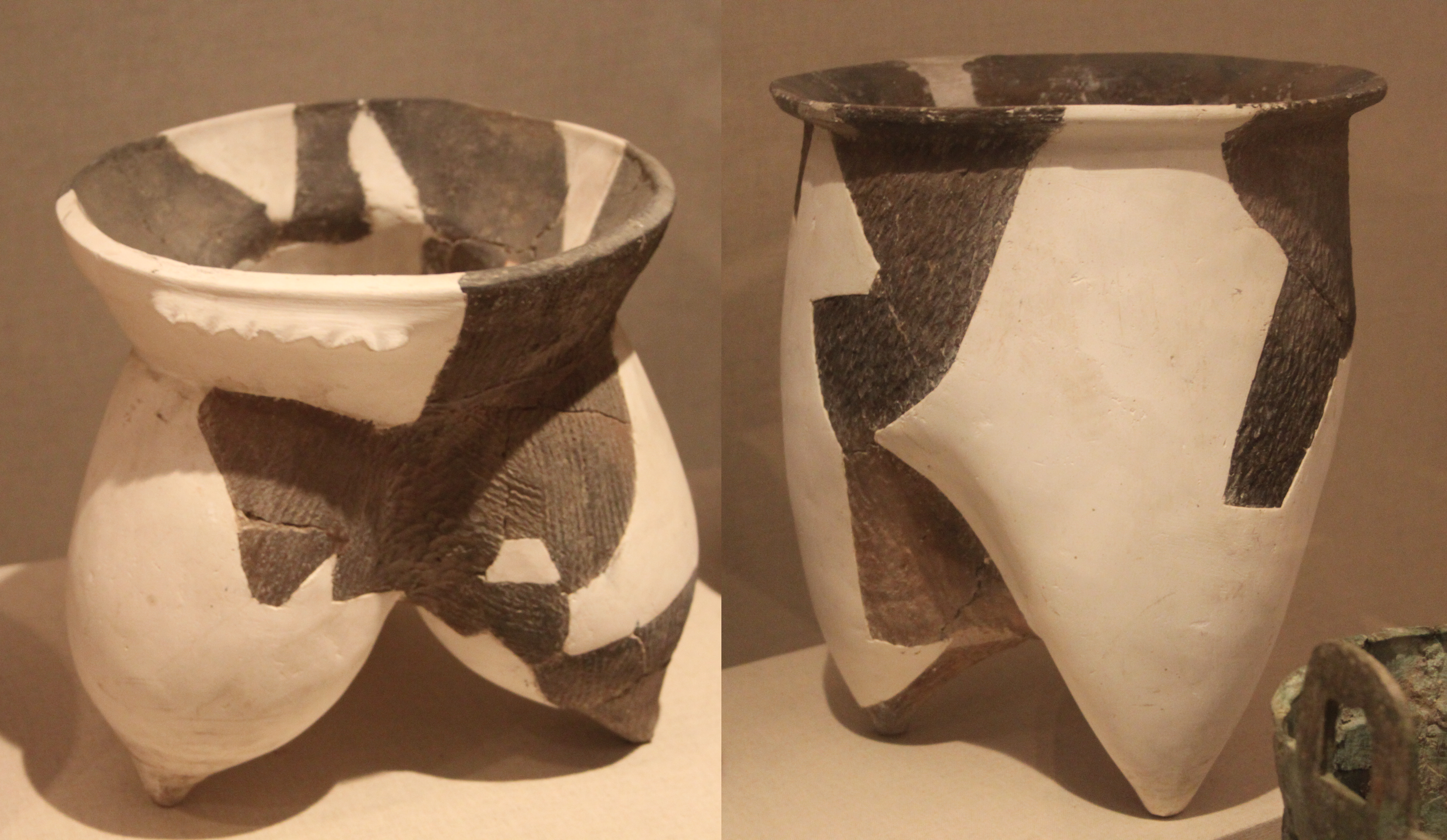
Two distinct forms of tripod cooking pot (li) found in the pre-Zhou Wei valley

The valley was known historically as the Guanzhong, or 'land within the passes'. To the east, a long and difficult road through the Hangu Pass, Sanmenxia and eastern extensions of the Qinling Mountains leads to the Luo River basin, which opens into the North China Plain. The route to the interior follows the Jing River to Xiao Pass on an eastern spur of the Liupan range and thence down the valley of the Qingshui River to the upper reaches of the Yellow River. This route would later be part of the Silk Road, and was used by armies throughout history. To the west, the Wei River passes through a deep gorge. The main route to the upper Wei valley followed the Qian River to Long Pass, and was still very difficult.

The origins of the Zhou are obscure. The archaeology of pre-conquest Wei valley is varied and complex, but no material culture comparable to the dynastic Zhou has been found. Archaeologists searching for the predynastic Zhou have focused on the Zhouyuan ('plain of Zhou'), a key ritual centre of the Western Zhou south of Qishan ('Mount Qi'), because Qishan is mentioned in the Odes. Two different pottery types are found in this area, and archaeologists differ on whether the people who produced one or the other, or both, were the ancestors of the Zhou. It is likely that several groups from across Shaanxi banded together to conquer the Shang.

== History ==
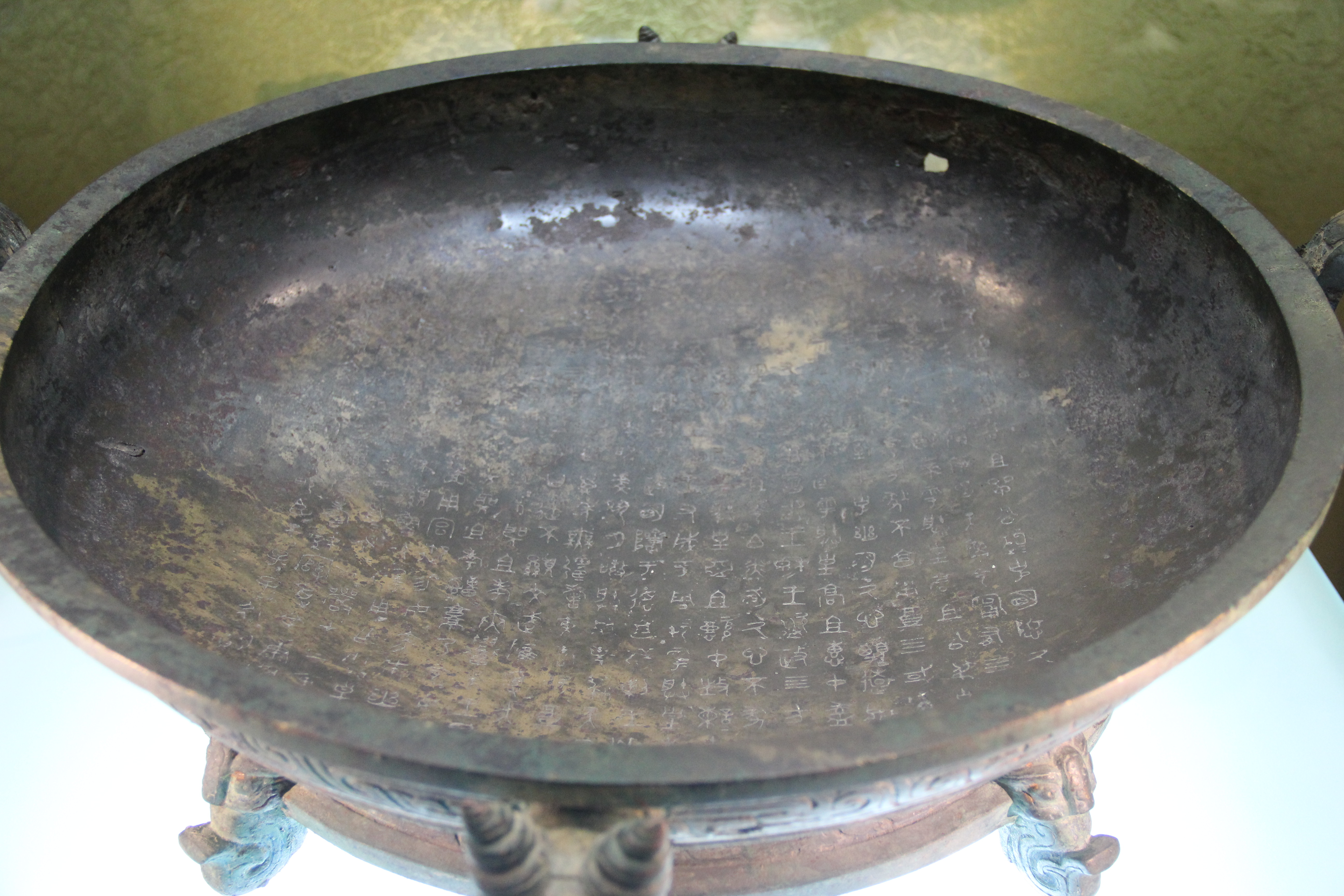
The Lai (or Qiu) pan, from the reign of King Xuan, bears an inscription listing all the kings from King Wen to King Li.

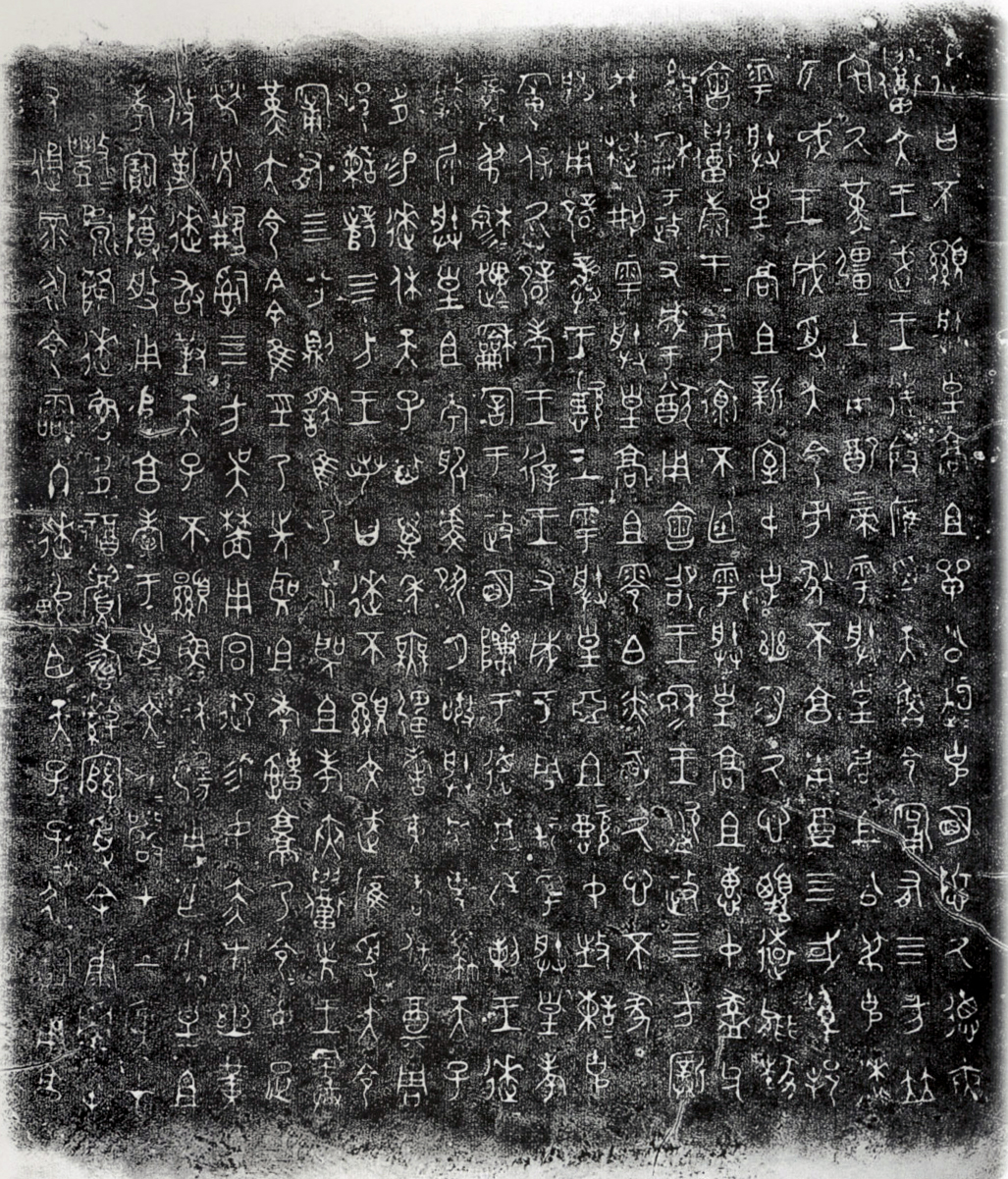
Rubbing of the Lai (or Qiu) pan inscription

The sequence of Western Zhou kings given by the Han historian Sima Qian is matched (except for a few minor character variants) by the list inscribed on the excavated Lai pan. Inscriptions and received texts hint at some irregularities in the succession, but these had apparently been smoothed out in the official narrative by the time of the Lai pan. Most scholars divide the Western Zhou into early, middle and late periods, which also correspond roughly to stylistic changes in bronze vessels.

Sima Qian felt unable to extend his chronological table beyond 841 BC, the first year of the Gonghe Regency, and there is still no accepted chronology of Chinese history before that point. The Cambridge History of Ancient China used dates determined by Edward L. Shaughnessy from the "current text" Bamboo Annals and bronze inscriptions. In 2000, the Xia–Shang–Zhou Chronology Project produced a schedule of dates based on received texts, bronze inscriptions, radiocarbon dating and astronomical events. However, several bronze inscriptions discovered since then are inconsistent with the project's dates.

Western Zhou kings
Period	Ruler name		Reign (all dates BC)	
Period	Posthumous	Personal	Shaughnessy	XSZ Project
Pre-conquest	King Wen	Chang (昌)	1056–1050 (Note: Shaughnessy dates the Zhou conquest of the Shang to 1045 BC. Earlier dates represent the pre-dynastic Zhou.)	
Pre-conquest	King Wu	Fa (發)	1049–1043	1046–1043
Early	King Wu	Fa (發)	1049–1043	1046–1043
Early	King Cheng	Song (誦)	1042–1006	1042–1021
Early	King Kang	Zhao (釗)	1005–978	1020–996
Early	King Zhao †	Xia (瑕)	977–957	995–977
Middle	King Mu	Man (滿)	956–918	976–922
Middle	King Gong	Yihu (繄扈)	917–900	922–900
Middle	King Yih	Jian (囏)	899–873	899–892
Middle	King Xiao	Pifang (辟方)	872?–866	891–886
Middle	King Yi	Xie (燮)	865–858	885–878
Late	King Li	Hu (胡)	857–842	877–841
Late	Gonghe Regency		841–828	841–828
Late	King Xuan	Jing (靜)	827–782	827–782
Late	King You †	Gongnie (宮涅)	782–771	781–771

=== Conquest of the Shang ===
The conquest is reflected in the material record by the sudden appearance throughout the Wei River basin of burials in the Shang style and sophisticated bronze vessels of all the types produced by the Shang, from whom the Zhou had evidently acquired skilled craftsmen, scribes and abundant resources. They also expanded the Late Shang practice of inscribing bronze vessels to create lengthy texts recording the accomplishments of their owners and honours bestowed on them by the king. The inscriptions also show that the Zhou had adopted Shang ancestor rituals. This adoption of Shang practices suggests an effort to legitimate Zhou rule. However, the Zhou did not adopt human sacrifice, which was so extensive in the Late Shang, or even mention it in any of their texts.

The Shi Qiang pan, part of a family cache found in western Shaanxi, was cast in the reign of King Gong by the latest in a family of scribes descended from a scribe brought to Shaanxi after the conquest. The lengthy inscription, summarizing the history of the Zhou and that of the Wei (微) family, begins:

Accordant with antiquity was King Wen! (He) first brought harmony to government. The Lord on High sent down fine virtue and great security. Extending to the high and low, he joined the ten thousand states.

Capturing and controlling was King Wu! (He) proceeded and campaigned through the four quarters, piercing Yin [= Shang] and governing its people. Eternally unfearful of the Di (Distant Ones), oh, he attacked the Yi minions.

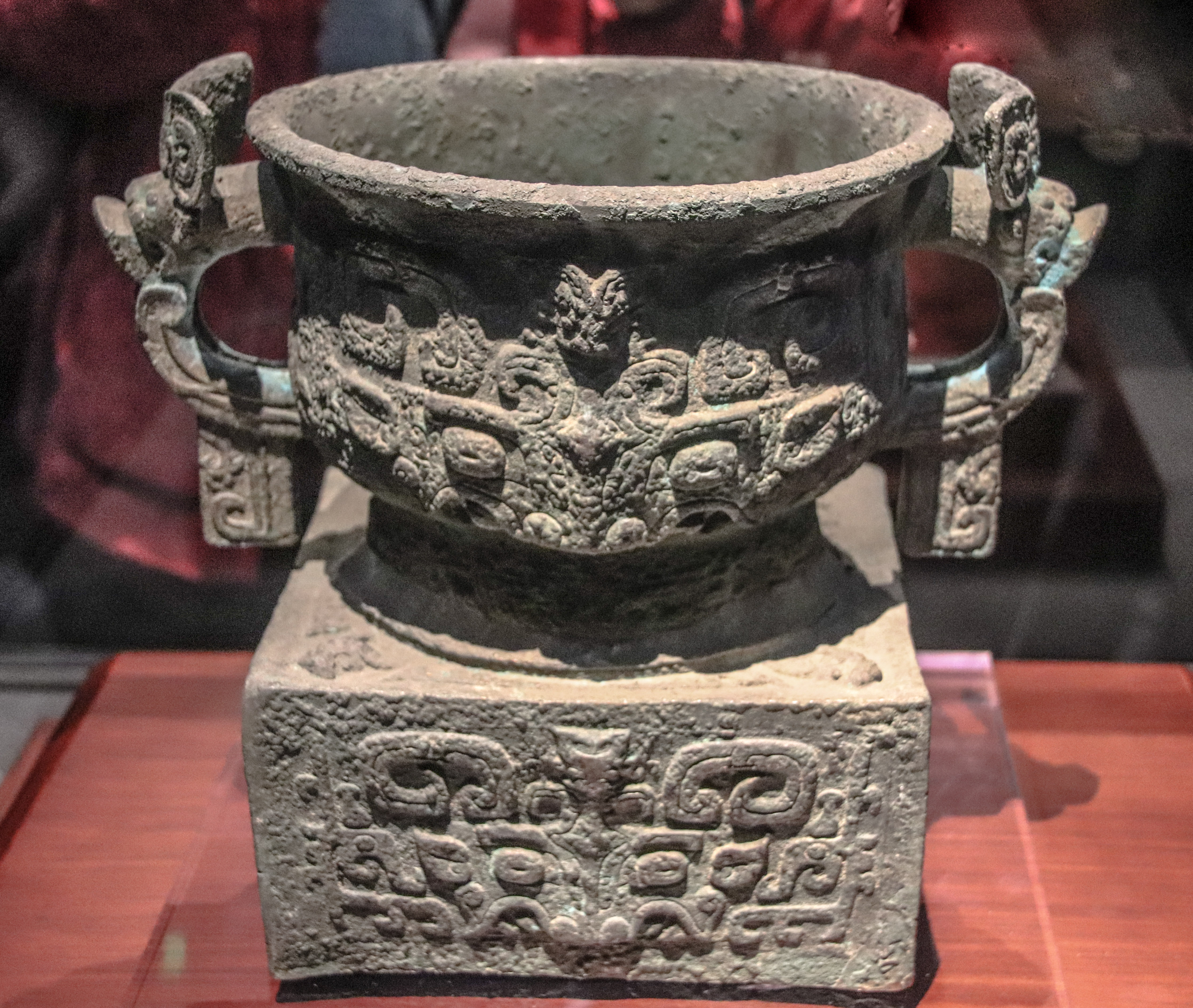
The Li gui, cast shortly after the conquest, bears an inscription describing the event.

Longer accounts are found in later sources. Both the Historical Records and the Bamboo Annals describe campaigns by King Wen in southern Shanxi. They state that King Wen moved the Zhou capital from Qiyi to Feng, and his son, King Wu, made a further move to Hao across the Feng River. King Wu is said to have expanded his father's campaigns to the Shang, defeating them in the decisive Battle of Muye, which is also described in the "Great brightness" song of the Classic of Poetry.

The 33-character inscription on the Li gui gives a brief contemporaneous account of the conquest, confirming the sexagenary date given by received sources:

When King Wu rectified [= conquered] Shang, it was jiazi (day 1) morning. ... (Note: This 7-character passage is obscure, with many interpretations.) On xinwei (day 8), the king was at Jian encampment and gave officer Li metal, used to cast for my honoured ancestor Zhan this precious ritual vessel.

According to the Yi Zhou Shu, the Zhou army spent two months in the area mopping up resistance before returning to the Wei valley. The received texts relate that King Wen left two or three of his brothers (depending on the source) to oversee the former Shang domains, nominally ruled by Wu Geng, the son of the last Shang king.

=== Civil war and expansion ===
Western Zhou royal domain (dashed outline), capitals and colonies (black squares) and archaeological sites

King Wu died two or three years after the conquest, triggering a crisis of the young state. According to the traditional histories, one of King Wu's brothers, the Duke of Zhou declared himself regent for King Wu's son, the future King Cheng. (Note: 'Duke' is the conventional translation of the word gong, but this is anachronistic for the Western Zhou, when it signified a respected patriarch rather than a noble rank.) Later Confucian scholars, who glorified the Duke of Zhou, described the young king as a babe in his mother's arms, but other evidence indicates that he was a young man at the time. Some authors suggest that the Duke appointed himself king, and in the "Announcement to Kang" chapter of the Book of Documents he seems to speak as a king.

Wu Geng then rebelled against the new regime. The Shiji says that the brothers of King Wu tasked with supervising him conspired in the rebellion, but the Xinian in the Tsinghua Bamboo Slips says they were its first victims. The Duke of Zhou and his half-brother, the Duke of Shao, organized another eastern campaign. After three years they had regained the lost areas and expanded their domain over an area stretching into Shandong.

The victorious triumvirate of the Duke of Zhou, Duke of Shao and King Cheng then consolidated their control over this expanded territory. They built an eastern capital at Chengzhou (modern day Luoyang) and began founding colonies or states at strategic points in their domain. The most important were placed under members of the ruling family. These colonies are listed in the Zuozhuan, and some have been confirmed by archaeological finds. The inscription on the Mai zun narrates the ceremony in which King Cheng appointed a son of the Duke of Zhou to rule Xing.

Kings Cheng and Kang mounted numerous military campaigns to expand their domains. The Xiao Yu ding relates a victory over the Guifang, presumably in the Ordos region, late in the reign of King Kang. Several bronze inscriptions record a successful southern campaign in the Han River region, in the 16th year of King Zhao's reign. A second campaign in the same area three years later ended with King Zhao losing his armies and his own life, bringing the phase of expansion to a close.

=== Middle period ===
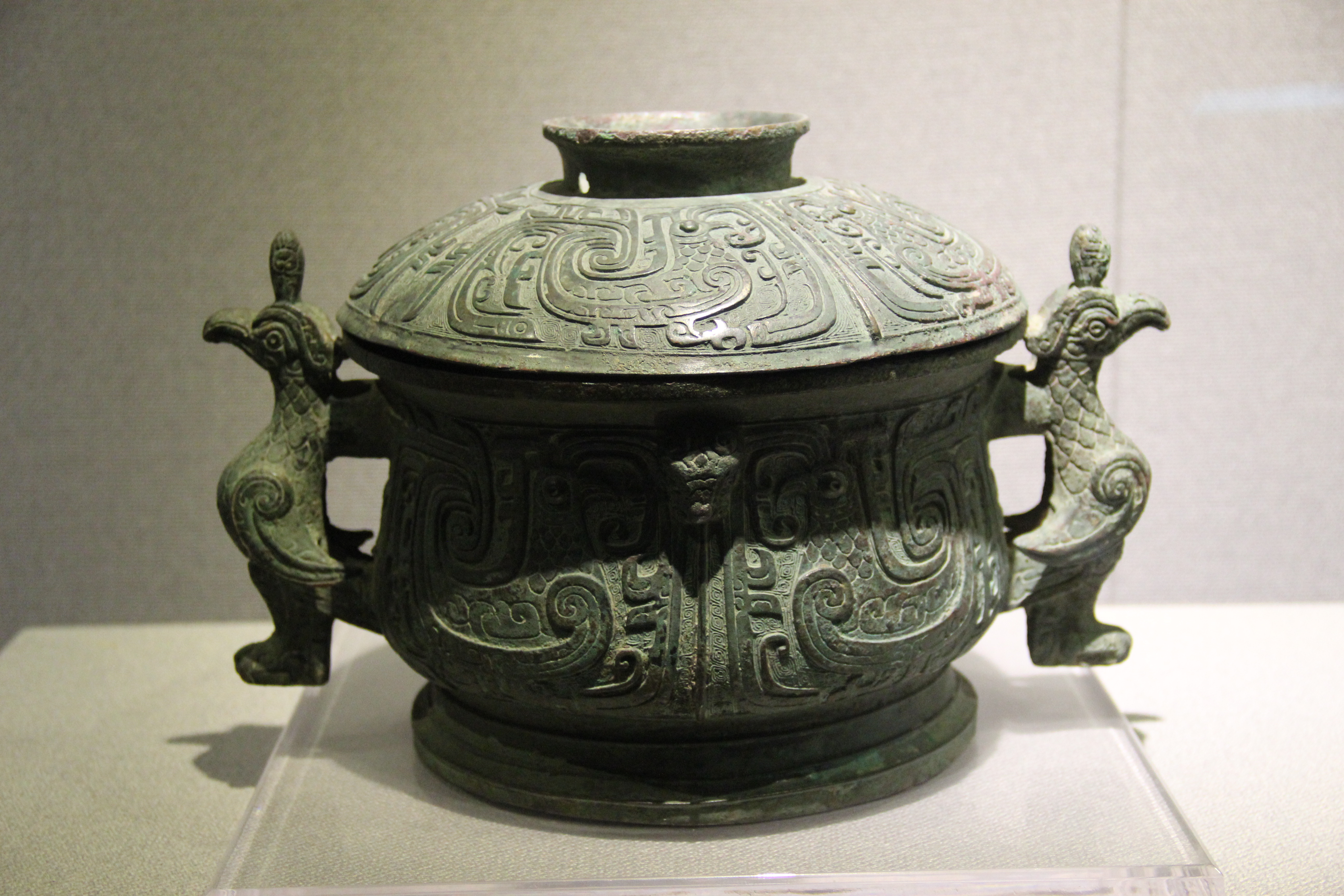
The Dong gui, whose inscription records a victory over the Dongyi in the reign of King Mu

During the reign of King Mu, the Zhou state shifted to the defensive, particularly in the east. The Bamboo Annals records a campaign against the Xu Rong, who had to be driven back from the eastern capital. The inscription on the Dong gui celebrates a defeat inflicted by the Zhou on the Dongyi near Ying, a colony set up by one of King Cheng's brothers to guard the southern approaches to the capital.

With the passing of generations, the family relationships between the king and the rulers of the colonies had also become more distant. Instead, the Zhou state developed a bureaucracy and formalized relations between the elites. There were reforms of the military, official titles and the distribution of land. A drastic shift in the style and types of bronze ritual vessels, formerly based on Late Shang models, also suggests a change in ritual practice at this time.

Very little historical information is available for the reigns of the next four kings, Gong, Yih, Xiao and Yi. Western Zhou kings were customarily succeeded by their oldest sons, but Sima Qian states, without explanation, that King Yih was succeeded by his uncle, who became King Xiao, and that on Xiao's death "the many lords restored" King Yih's son, King Yi. Bronze inscriptions of the time use two different royal calendars, and the Bamboo Annals mentions King Yih moving out of the capital. Some authors suggest that King Yih was forced out by his uncle, and the two were rivals for a time, but whatever happened is now obscure. The succession was already presented as a linear sequence of kings in the Lai pan, cast in the reign of King Yi's grandson. (Note: Falkenhausen notes that the Lai pan omits another irregularity, the Gonghe Regency, which would have occurred in living memory.)

Both Sima Qian and the Bamboo Annals state that King Yi boiled the Duke of Qi (in eastern Shandong) in a cauldron. A bronze inscription confirms a Zhou attack on Qi at this time. This incident, in a state originally founded by one of King Wu's generals, indicates the waning authority of the Zhou king. Soon afterwards, the Zhou were attacked by Chu, who reached as far as the Luo River before being driven off in a counterattack described in the Yu ding and Yu gui.

=== Late period ===
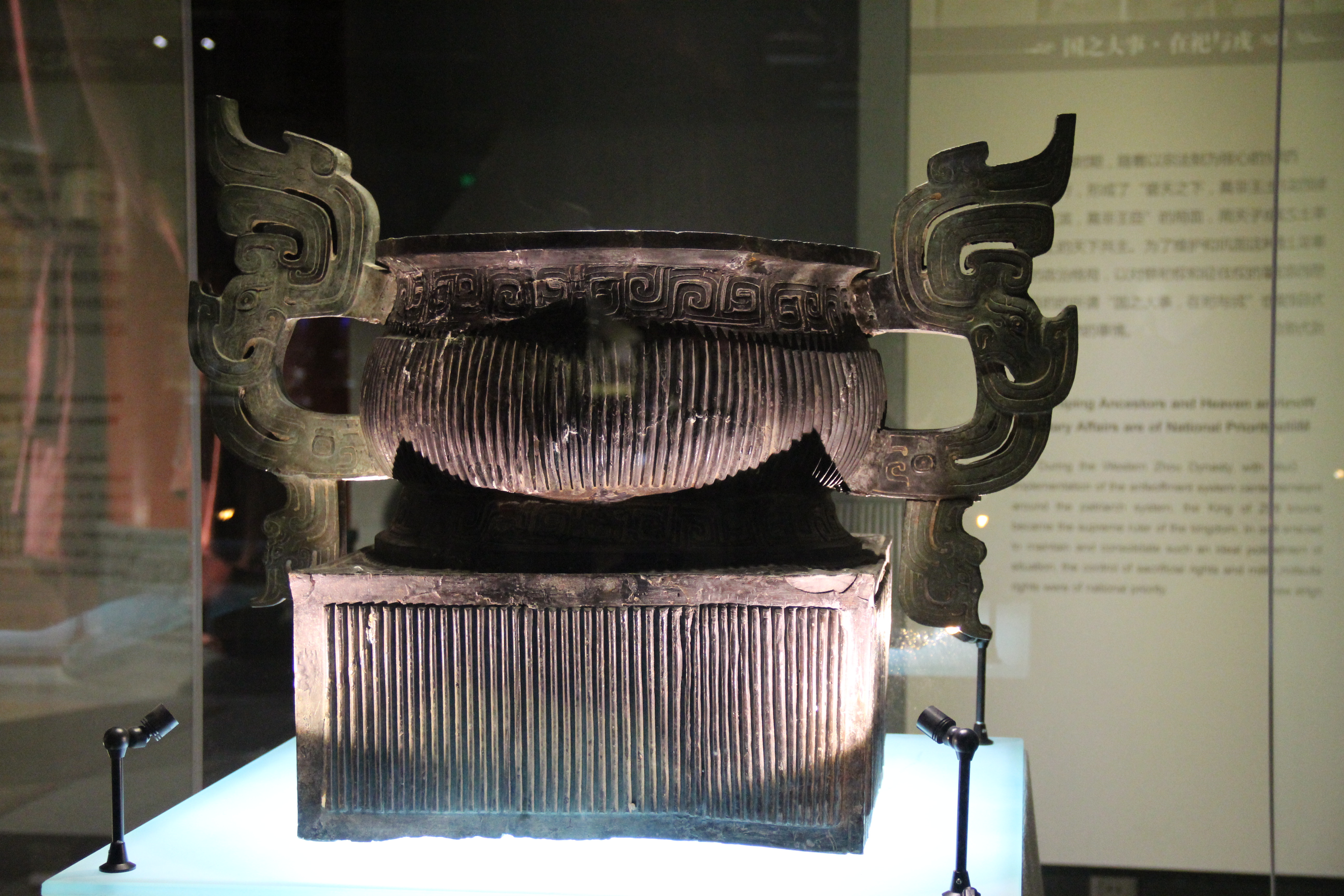
The Hu gui, cast in the 12th year of King Li

King Li embarked on defensive campaigns in the east and northwest. The received texts all present him in a negative light, and record that he was driven out of the capital into exile in the Fen River valley. Sources disagree on whether this was a revolt of the peasantry or the nobility, but agree that the king's infant son was barely saved from a mob. The Bamboo Annals, confirmed by bronze inscriptions, relate that control of the state passed to Lord He, instituting the Gonghe Regency. Sima Qian's belief that it was a co-regency was based on a misinterpretation of the name.

When King Li died in exile, his son became King Xuan. Both received texts and bronze inscriptions suggest that King Xuan acted quickly to secure the state. In his 5th year, he ordered a campaign against the Xianyun in the west, and then appointed the successful general to command the eastern territories. According to the Bamboo Annals, in the following year he ordered a campaign against the Huaiyi in the southeast. Bronze inscriptions record victories in this campaign and others against the Xianyun. He reinforced the south by relocating settlements from the Wei valley to the Nanyang basin and sought to improve relations with distant Zhou states in the northeast and east. At the same time, the king also had to contend with succession struggles in some of the old Zhou states.

According to received texts, King You's reign began with ominous portents. The texts, as well as some of the Minor Court Songs, hint at factional struggles within the Zhou court. In his 11th year, the Quanrong attacked from the west, killing the king and causing the Zhou elite to flee from the Wei valley to the eastern capital, bringing the Western Zhou era to a close. Although Zhou royal power had been declining for over a century, this dramatic event presents a convenient milestone for historians. The Zhou would continue to occupy the eastern capital for another five centuries, but their sway over the states they had established became increasingly nominal.

== Society ==
=== Kinship groups ===
The Zhou introduced clan names (xìng 姓) identifying broad kinship groups by their maternal origins. Some scholars suggest that clan names were introduced to regulate marriages between the different ethnic groups of the Wei valley that formed the pre-dynastic Zhou. About a dozen intermarrying clans are mentioned repeatedly in bronze inscriptions. The most prominent was the Jī (姬) clan of the Zhou kings, the rulers of most of the eastern colonies and much of the Wei valley aristocracy. More than half of the primary wives of Western Zhou kings belonged to the Jiāng (姜) clan.

The primary unit of the social, political and economic organization of the Western Zhou elite was the lineage, a smaller group within a clan, typically controlling several villages and their fields. In addition to personal names (míng 名), elite males were referred to by their lineage names (shì 氏), while elite women were referred to by their clan names. Commoners had neither clan nor lineage names.

Lineage leadership passed from father to the eldest son of his primary wife, with other sons forming families within the lineage. As lineages grew, branches might form minor lineages, which were expected to obey their primary lineage. This chain of obedience also governed the offshoot lineages set up by the royal family to rule the colonies they founded. Warring States texts describe a rule by which new lineages were formed every five generations, but there is no evidence of this in Western Zhou inscriptions.

By the middle Western Zhou, land originally bestowed by the king was treated as the property of a lineage, apportioned by the lineage head to the families of the lineage. Inscriptions record the transfer of parcels of land between individuals, including to settle lawsuits.

=== Settlements ===
The basic unit of Western Zhou society, as with the preceding Shang, was the settlement (yì 邑), a residential core surrounded by farmland, with peripheral forests and marshes. The Mencius and Rites of Zhou describe an idealized well-field system regulating the allocation of fields and taxation during the Western Zhou, but such a rigid system is incompatible with the inscriptional evidence. Settlements occurred in a range of sizes, from hamlets to cities, all with the same basic structure. At first, each settlement was populated by a kin group, but this changed over the centuries.

== Government ==
The Western Zhou state was a layered network controlling thousands of settlements scattered across northern China. At the head of the state stood the king, who governed through divine legitimacy inherited from the founding King Wen. After the expansion of the early period, the Zhou state was organized in two parts. The Wei valley and the eastern capital formed the royal domain, ruled directly by the king. The rulers of the polities established in the east, usually heads of branches of the royal lineage, ruled with authority delegated by the king. Their rulers exercised local autonomy, but owed allegiance and submission to the king. As the state consolidated in the middle period, the administration became more structured and systematized.

The term fēngjiàn 封建 first appears in the Zuo Zhuan, from the Warring States period. It has often been translated as a feudal practice of enfeoffment, but it is now considered misleading to analyse Western Zhou institutions in terms of European feudalism. The two characters appear separately in bronze inscriptions: fēng 封 originally meant 'to plant trees to mark boundaries', while jiàn 建 meant 'to establish'. It is likely that they referred respectively to land allocation in the royal domain and foundation of colonies in the east, but were combined in later accounts.

=== Political ideology ===
The Western Zhou are credited with the idea of the Mandate of Heaven, the divine right to rule that could be maintained through virtuous behaviour, but which could also be lost to another ruling house. For example, the "Announcement of Shao" chapter of the Book of Documents, attributed to the Duke of Shao, says

Examining the ancient prior people, the Xia, Heaven led [them] to follow and protected [them], and they faced and fathomed Heaven's approval; [yet], now they have already lost their mandate. Now examining the Yin, Heaven led [them] to approach and protected [them], and they faced and fathomed Heaven's approval; [yet], now they have already lost their mandate. Now if the young son succeeds, there will be no neglect of the elders.

Closely related were the view of the reigning king as the "Son of Heaven" and the elevation for the first two kings, Wen and Wu, as ideal rulers.

The doctrine of the Mandate of Heaven became very influential in Chinese historiography, implying a dynastic cycle, with each dynasty assumed to begin with a virtuous ruler receiving the mandate and ending with a bad ruler losing it. As Sima Qian put it,

The way of the Three Dynasties of old is like a cycle which, when it ends must begin over again.

— Shiji 8: 393–394

It is often suggested that this idea was invented by the early Zhou to justify their rule to the conquered Shang. However, the inscriptional record suggests that these ideas developed over the course of the Western Zhou period. The term "Son of Heaven" for the current king is first attested in a bronze inscription from the reign of King Kang or King Zhao. It became the norm from the start of the middle period. Two inscriptions from the early period refer to the Great Command being given to King Wen by Heaven. Subsequent kings obtained their legitimacy from their descent from King Wen. Mentions of the Mandate increase in the middle and late periods. The pairing of the idealized founding kings Wen and Wu as recipients of the Mandate becomes common in inscriptions of the late period.

Differences with the language of the inscriptions suggest that the oldest of the Documents were the products of a commemorative tradition near the end of the period. For example, no Western Zhou inscription mentions the Xia. The linkage made in the Documents chapters between royal virtue and care for the welfare of the people is absent from the inscriptions.

=== Royal domain ===
The area under direct royal control included the Wei valley and a small area around Chengzhou. Bronze inscriptions describe kings moving between "Five Cities" in the royal domain, appointing officials and carrying out the business of government. Three of these cities are thought to be Hao and Feng near modern Xi'an, as well as a city in the Zhouyuan, but the other two have not been identified.

Excavations in the Zhouyuan have yielded rammed-earth foundations of building complexes, oracle bones, cemeteries, pottery and bronze workshops and hoards of bronze ritual vessels. The vessels span the Western Zhou period, suggesting that the area was a religious centre, with representatives of many elite families maintaining their own altars there. Bronze inscriptions indicate that all royal temples after King Kang were located in the Zhouyuan, making it a key religious and administrative centre. A walled enclosure containing 22 elite tombs, a configuration unknown elsewhere, was discovered at Zhougong Miao, 18 km (11 mi) west of Zhouyuan. These include royal tombs, but have not been excavated.

Extensive cemeteries, but no royal tombs or administrative buildings, have been discovered in the area of Feng and Hao. The furnishings of the tombs suggest that high- to mid-level Zhou families lived in the area.

The eastern capital of Chengzhou or Louyi was established on the Lou River (near modern Luoyang after the suppression of the civil war in the reign of King Cheng. Archaeologists disagree on its exact location, and whether there was one city or two. Western Zhou tombs and bronzes were first found at Wangcheng, the site of the Eastern Zhou capital, but many more tombs were found on both sides of the Chan River (in modern Chanhe district) 8 km (5.0 mi) to the east.

Surrounding the capitals in the Wei valley were the bases of the various lineages, each surrounded by the settlements of the lineage. The heads of these lineages were typically called bó 伯 'oldest son', etymologically 'thumb' (the first finger of the hand).

=== Bureaucracy ===
The Rites of Zhou claims to describe 379 posts in the Western Zhou government, divided between 6 departments. However, this text dates from late in the Warring States period, and represents an idealization of the philosophical and political ideas of that time.

Contemporaneous evidence of the structure of Western Zhou government comes from inscriptions describing appointment ceremonies (cèmìng 冊命, literally 'document appointment'). These became very frequent and increasingly ritualized from the middle period, indicating the formalization of government roles and the rise of their prestige among the elite. A typical ceremony is described on the Shi Song dǐng, dated to the reign of King Xuan:

It was the third year, fifth month, after the dying brightness, jiǎxū (day 11). The king was in Kang Shao palace in Zhou. At dawn, the king entered the grand chamber and assumed his position. Superintendent Hong accompanied Song to his right, entered the gate and stood in the centre of the courtyard. The Chief (Interior Scribe) received the document of royal command, and the king called out to Scribe Guosheng to command Song with the written document.

The king said: "Song, [I] command you to take office in charge of the warehouses in Chengzhou, and to inspect and supervise the newly constructed warehouses, using palace attendants. [I] award you a black jacket with brocaded hem, red kneepads, a scarlet semi-circlet, a chime pennant, a bridle with bit and cheek-pieces, with which to serve."

Song bowed with his head touching the ground and received the bamboo document of royal command, hanging it [on his sash] and coming out.

Thanks to the prevalence of these inscriptions, historians have a clearer picture of government in the Western Zhou period than in the preceding Late Shang or the following Springs and Autumns period.

The first mentions of a government department called the Ministry (Qīngshìliáo 卿事寮) occur at the end of the early period. From the middle period, the Ministry is headed by the Three Supervisors, the Supervisor of Horse (Sīmǎ 司馬), Supervisor of Lands (Sītǔ 司土) and Supervisor of Works (Sīgōng 司工). The same three-supervisor is found at every level of Zhou administration.

By this time, there was also a Grand Secretariat (Tàishǐliáo 太史寮), staffed by scribes keeping records and producing orders, under a Grand Scribe (Tàishǐ 太史) There was also a separate organization of the Royal Household (Wángjiā 王家), headed by the Superintendent (Zǎi 宰) an staffed by many officials including the Provisioner (Shànfū 膳夫) and a scribal office headed by the Chief Interior Scribe (Nèishǐ yǐn 內史尹).

After the suppression on the civil war and the establishment of the eastern capital of Chengzhou, the military was organized as the Six Armies of the West, stationed in the Wei valley, and the Eight Armies of Chengzhou, stationed near the eastern capital. The size of these armies is unknown, but they were known to include both infantry and chariot troops.

=== Regional polities ===
The conquest of the Shang and the subsequent civil war brought the Zhou vast new territories in the east. To control this area, the Zhou established the eastern capital and many regional polities (guó 國, later 'country') usually headed by royal relatives. These polities were located at the fertile edge of the alluvial plain, and often in groups of three. The lower Yellow River area, which was prone to flooding, was generally avoided until the Warring States period.

Each polity was a cluster of settlements (yì 邑) surrounding the site of the ruler's residence, lineage temple and cemetery. The ruler's family formed the peak of the social hierarchy, followed by immigrants from the Wei valley, and lastly by the local population, who often retained their previous material culture for centuries after falling under Zhou control.

The ruler was typically given the title hóu 侯 'archer lord'. He held full authority over the polity, considered as an agent of the Zhou king. He was responsible for the defence of the polity, but was also obliged to lend military assistance to the king when requested. The regional ruler reinforced his relationship with the king through personal visits to the royal domain and participation in the rituals of the central court. Bronze inscriptions also refer to Inspectors (jiān 監) placed in the regional states by the king.

Regional governments had many of the same offices as the central government, including the Three Supervisors, Grand Scribe and Grand Invocator, but the Grand Superintendent was more prominent. However, the regional polities lacked the bureaucratic structure that developed in the central government from the middle Western Zhou, being closer to the highly personal style of the early period. There is very little mention of government at the local level within the regional polities before the Springs and Autumns period.

Pottery, bronze vessels, chariot fittings, weaponry and burial practices are similar across the Western Zhou realm. This uniformity suggests central direction of many aspects of life, at least at the elite level represented in excavations.

== Religion ==
Western Zhou inscriptions introduce a deity, Tiān (天 'heaven'), who does not appear in Late Shang inscriptions. There are occasional mentions of mentions of the Late Shange deity Dì (帝). Scholars are divided on the relationship between the two, with some maintaining that the names referred to the same deity, while others believe that they had distinct roles. Other powers do not appear in these texts.

=== Burial practices ===
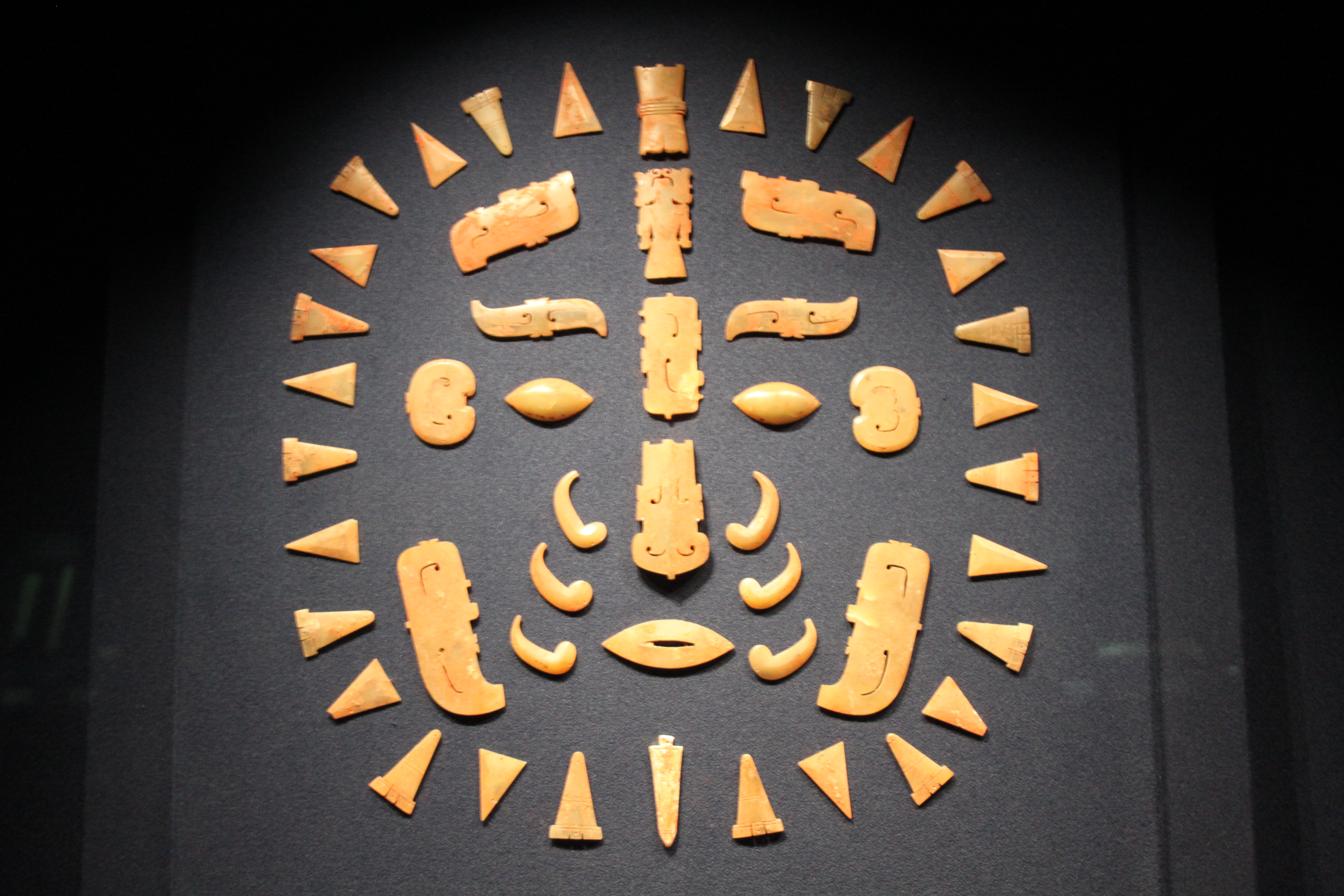
Jade pieces used to cover the face of the deceased in a late Western Zhou tomb

Elite tombs in the early Western Zhou have a similar structure to those of the eastern plains. Burials took place in rectangular pits, with a north–south alignment. A ramp excavated to the south allowed the coffin and burial offerings to be brought to a wooden structure (guǒ 槨) constructed at the bottom of the pit. In high-status burials, a second ramp was excavated to the north, shorter and a little higher than the south ramp, and with steps, possibly for a select audience for the funeral. The coffin was typically placed north–south, with deceased placed in a supine position with the head usually to the north. A pit under the coffin (yāokēng 腰坑 'waist pit') held a sacrificed deer or dog. The area around the sides of the guǒ was filled with rammed earth to form a ledge (èrcéngtái 二層台 on which ritual vessels and further sacrifices, especially of horses, were placed. The grave was then sealed by filling the pit and ramps with rammed earth.

However, there were differences from Late Shang practices. The practice of burying attendants with their lord continued, but on a reduced scale, and the additional human sacrifices seen in Shang burials are absent from those of the Western Zhou. Vessels for grain offerings were added to the burial assemblage from the start of the Western Zhou period. Towards the end of the middle period, there was a dramatic change in the ritual vessels found in elite burials. Several new types were introduced. Vessels became larger, and were produced in matching sets, often with identical inscriptions. Shang-style goblets and pourers for alcohol were finally abandoned, replaced by pairs of hu alcohol storage vessels over 50 cm (20 in) tall. Matching sets of bells, based on southern models, were added. The addition of decorative objects in semi-precious stone grew steadily throughout the Western Zhou period. The practice of covering the faces of the dead with appropriately shaped jade pieces appeared in the late period.

Western Zhou burials, from the Wei valley heartland to Yan in the northeast and Shandong in the east, are remarkably uniform in proportion and furnishings, following standards apparently imposed across the Western Zhou domain. This uniformity would break down during the following Springs and Autumns period, as local lords displayed their power and also incorporated elements from neighbouring peoples.

=== Ancestral sacrifice ===
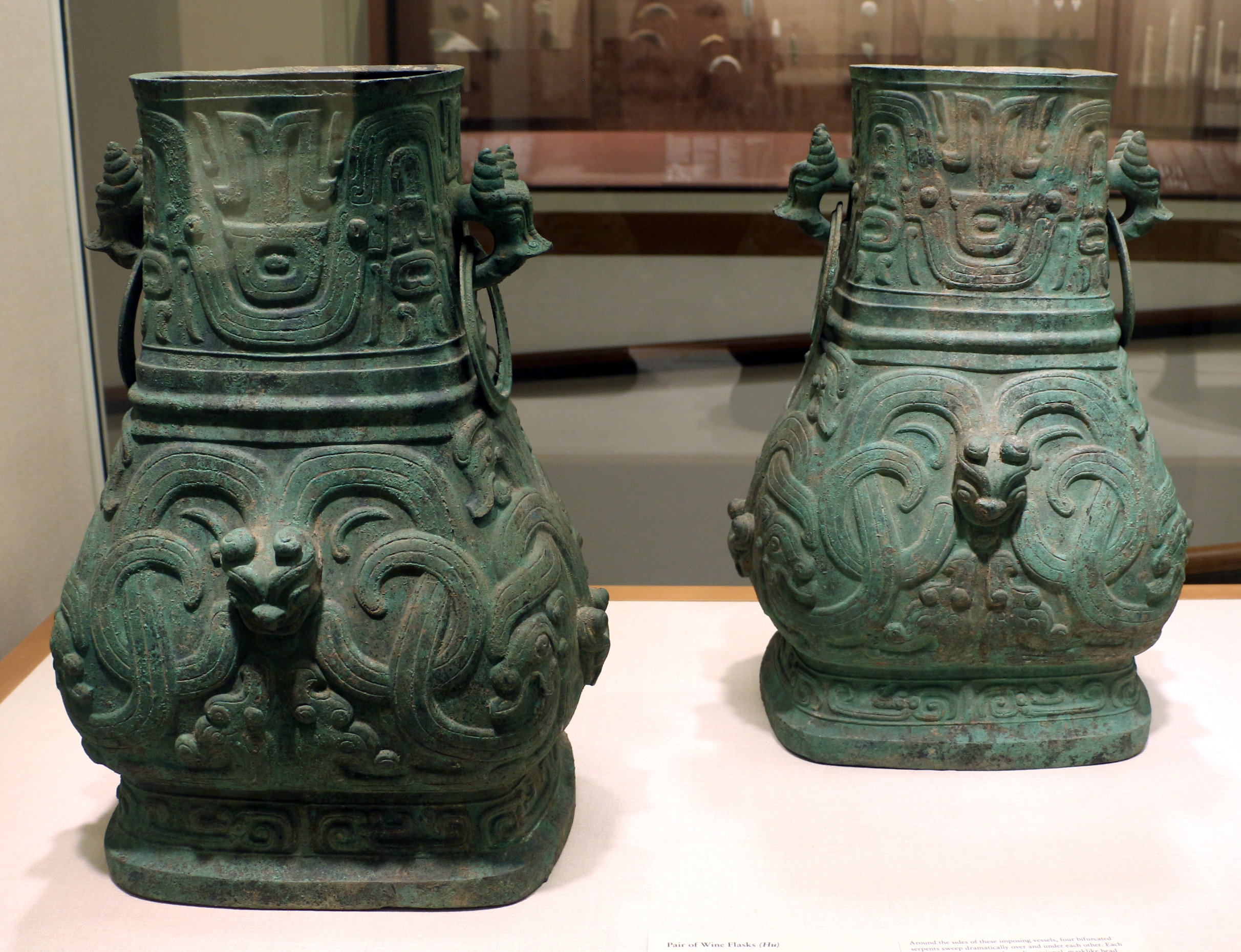
pair of matching hu vessels from the late period

Sacrifices to ancestors were the central religious ceremonies of the Zhou elite. Many received texts discuss these rituals, but most of these texts date from the Warring States period, and reflect an idealization of the centuries-earlier Western Zhou. The primary sources are ritual vessels and their inscriptions, as well as the earliest parts of the Odes and Documents, though these texts may also be affected by idealizing tendencies. Jessica Rawson has suggested that the mid-Western Zhou changes to the vessel assemblages in elite tombs reflect a major change in ritual practice, including a shift from a small family setting to a larger event involving more of the lineage group.

The received texts describe these rituals as taking place in lineage temples, which is confirmed by the late-period Nangong Yousi dǐng: (Note: Text: 南公有司作尊鼎。其萬年。子子孙孙永寶用享于宗廟。)

Officer Nangong made [this] precious cauldron. May it last ten thousand years. [May] sons of sons, grandsons of grandsons forever treasure and use [it] in the lineage temple.

The most detailed early description of an ancestor ritual is found in one of the Minor Court Hymns of the Odes, "Thorny caltrop" (Chǔcí 楚茨). This hymn appears to be the primary source for the more elaborate accounts found in the Three Ritual Classics from the Warring States period. The ritual is described as a communal feast during which the spirits of deceased ancestors were invited to descend from heaven to the ancestral temple to communicate with the living. Three roles are identified:

- the "pious descendent" (xiào sūn 孝孫), who was the head of the lineage,
- the "august impersonator" (huáng shī 皇尸), a adolescent member of the family representing the deceased ancestors, and
- the "officiating invoker (gōng zhù 工祝), a ritual specialist mediating between the two.

The Ode opens with the lineage members preparing offerings of millet, meat and ale. As the feast proceeds with presentations and toasts, the invoker announces to the pious descendent:

Fragrant has been your filial sacrifice,
And the Spirits have enjoyed your spirits and viands.
They confer upon you a hundred blessings;
Each as it is desired, each as sure as law.
You have been exact and expeditious;
You have been correct and careful:
They will ever confer on you the choicest favours,
In myriads and tens of myriads.

Drums and bells sound to mark the conclusion of the rites and to escort the impersonator from the temple, marking the return of the spirits to heaven.

Many inscriptions describe ceremonies in which the king conferred honours or appointments taking place in temples dedicated to royal ancestors. These temples are often described as being part of the palace, further emphasizing their dual religious and administrative functions.

== Arts ==
Western Zhou arts initially followed Late Shang models, but later incorporated external forms, especially from the south, and developed new styles. Several concurrent changes at the beginning of the late Western Zhou have been interpreted as reflecting a revolution in ritual practice.

=== Bronze vessels ===
The most common vessels throughout the period were the guǐ basin and dǐng cauldron. They were also the vessels most likely to carry long inscriptions.

Vessels of the early Western Zhou were elaborations of Late Shang designs, featuring high-relief decor, often with pronounced flanges, and made extensive use of the taotie motif. Wine vessels such as goblets and pouring vessels continued to be produced, but would largely disappear in later periods. Yǒu and zūn were usually cast in matching sets. The earliest guǐ were elevated on a base. Over time, vessels became less flamboyant.

By the mid-10th century BC (middle Western Zhou), the taotie had been replaced by pairs of long-tailed birds facing each other. Vessels shrank, and their profile became simpler. New types were the hú vase and xǔ vessel. Guǐ vessels of this period tend to have covers.

New types of vessel began to be introduced during the early 9th century BC, initially in western Shaanxi, then quickly spreading throughout the Wei valley. These new types, which were grouped in large sets, possibly reflect a change in Zhou ritual practice. Animal decorations were replaced by geometric forms such as ribbing and bands of lozenge shapes. Conversely, legs and handles became larger and more elaborate, and were often topped with animal heads.

Western Zhou dǐng cauldrons
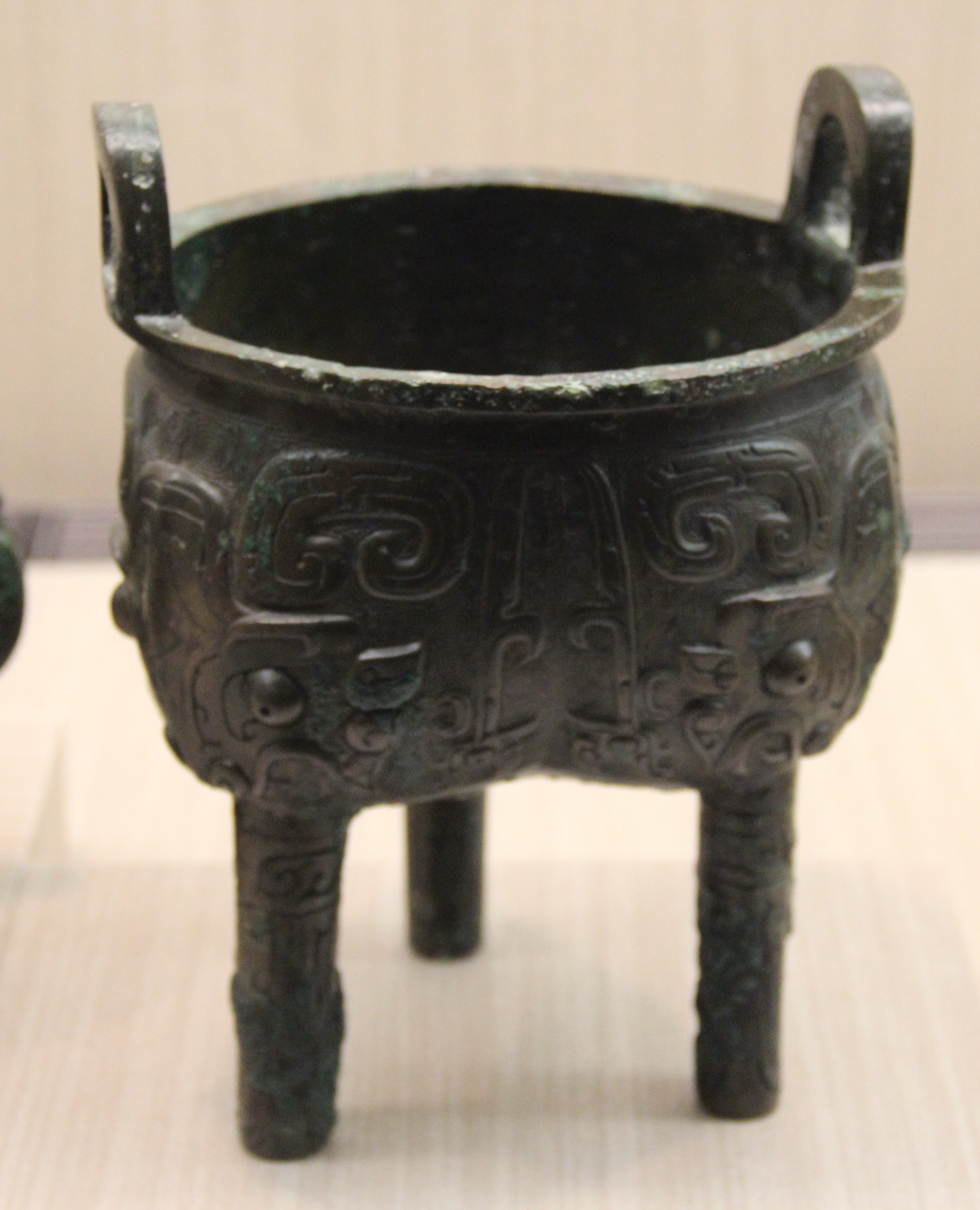
Xianhou dǐng, early Western Zhou

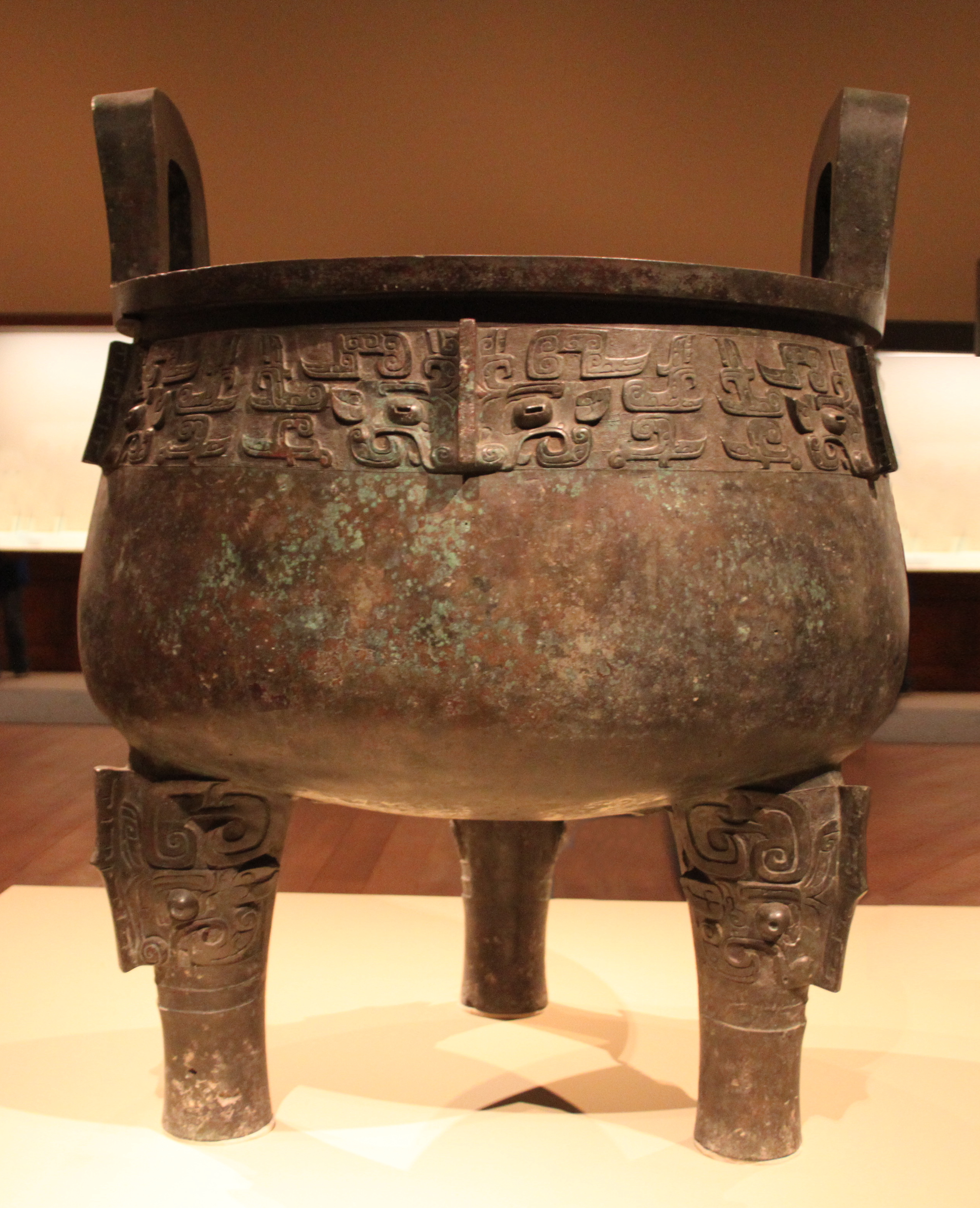
Da Yu dǐng, early Western Zhou

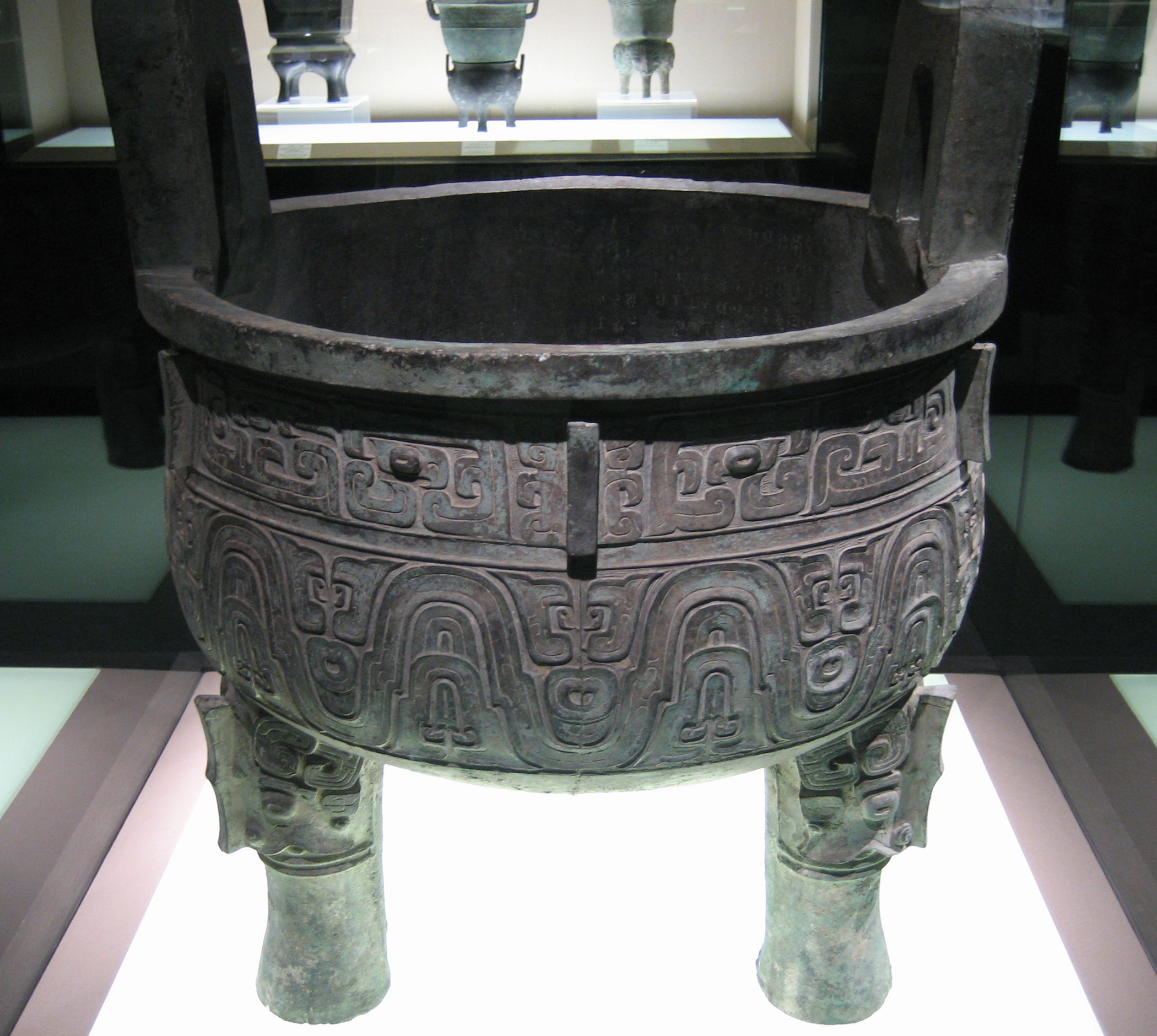
Da Ke dǐng, middle Western Zhou

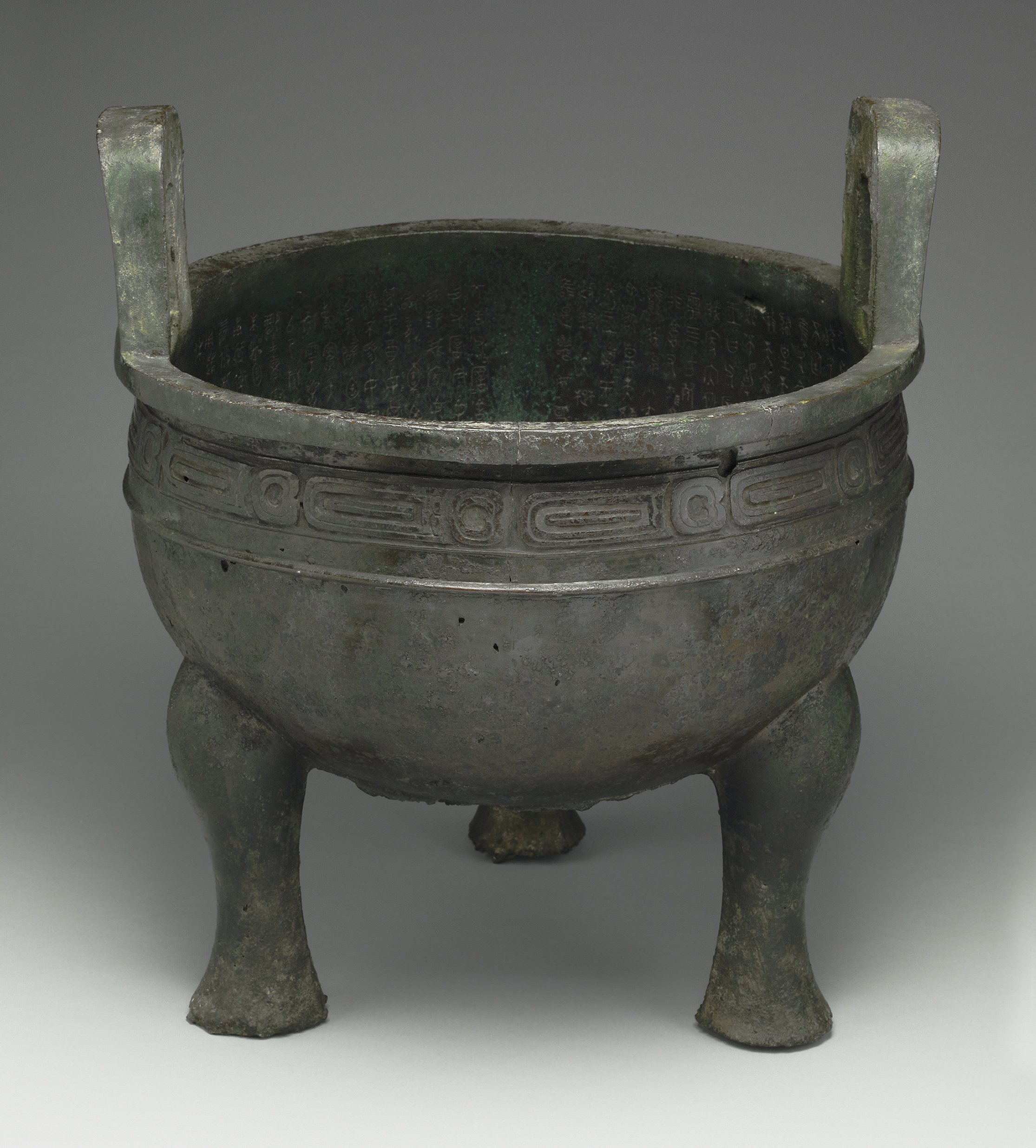
Mao Gong dǐng, late Western Zhou

=== Bronze bells ===
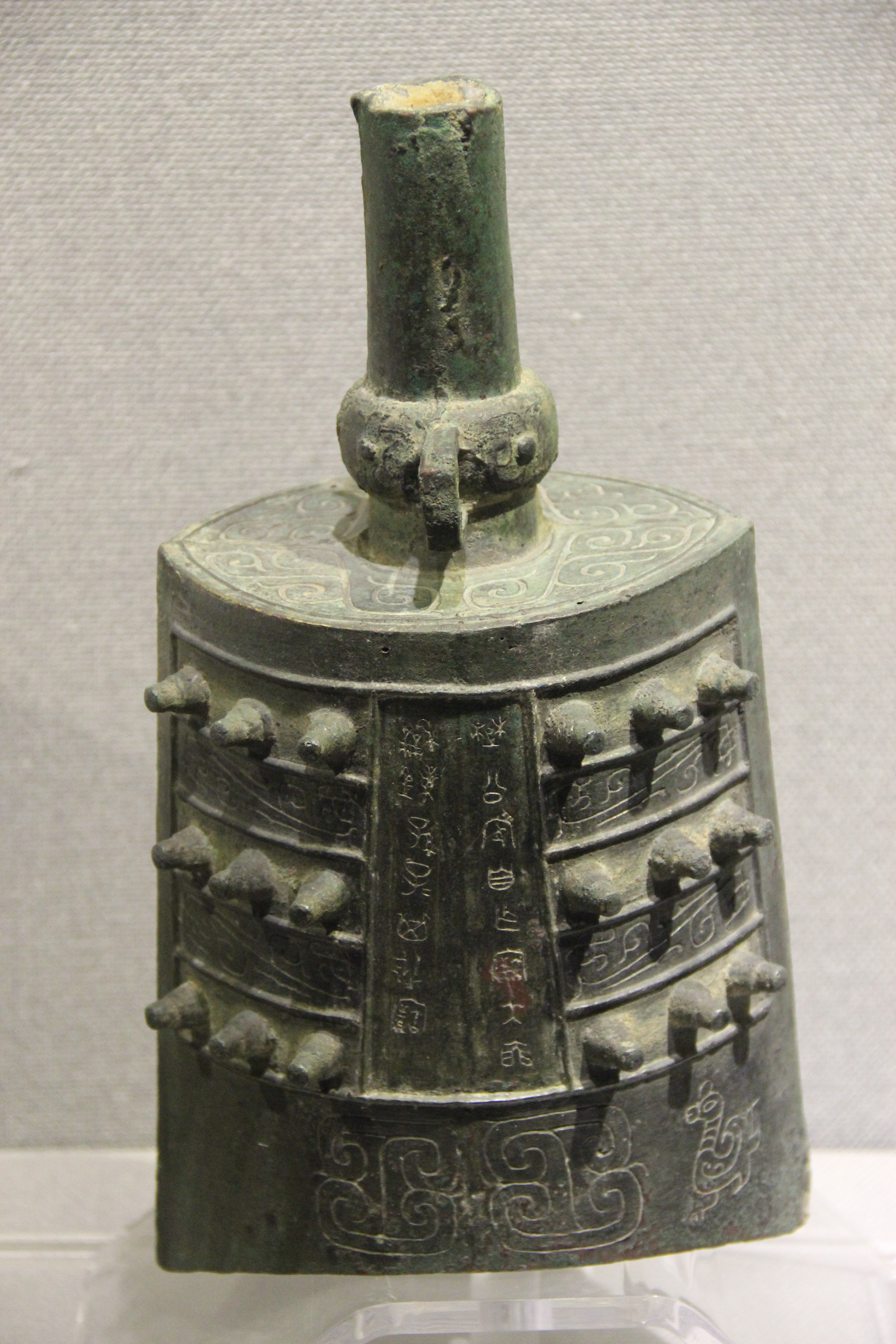
Western Zhou bronze bell

Bronze bells were developed in southern China from Guangxi to Jiangxi, with the greatest concentration in Hunan. The decoration changed from a pair of knobs derived from the eyes of the taotie motif to three rows of knobs on each side. Bells became longer and were given loops on their shanks, from they could be suspended. Bells of this type were imported to Shaanxi during the middle period. At first they were copied using moulds made from imported objects. Later local designs appeared as Zhou craftsmen mastered the techniques needed to produce tuned sets of instruments. Sets of three matching bells feature prominently in elite tombs, reflecting the role they had taken on in Zhou ceremonies honouring their ancestors.

=== Jade ===
Jade items were much rarer in early Western Zhou tombs than those of the Late Shang, and the fish- or bird-shaped amulets found may have been taken from the Shang. During the middle period, sophisticated jade working techniques were imported from the south, and combined with bead necklaces from the west. Popular motifs included birds and composite figures of human heads and dragons.
