= Wang Bo Jiang =

Queen consort of King Yih of Zhou (9th century BC)

Wang Bojiang (died 9th century BC) was the queen consort of King Yih of Zhou.

She had some influence at court. She managed the economic affairs of the Imperial household, arranged the banquets and rewarded the ministers.
