= King Gong of Zhou =

Sixth king of the Zhou dynasty

King Gong of Zhou 周共王
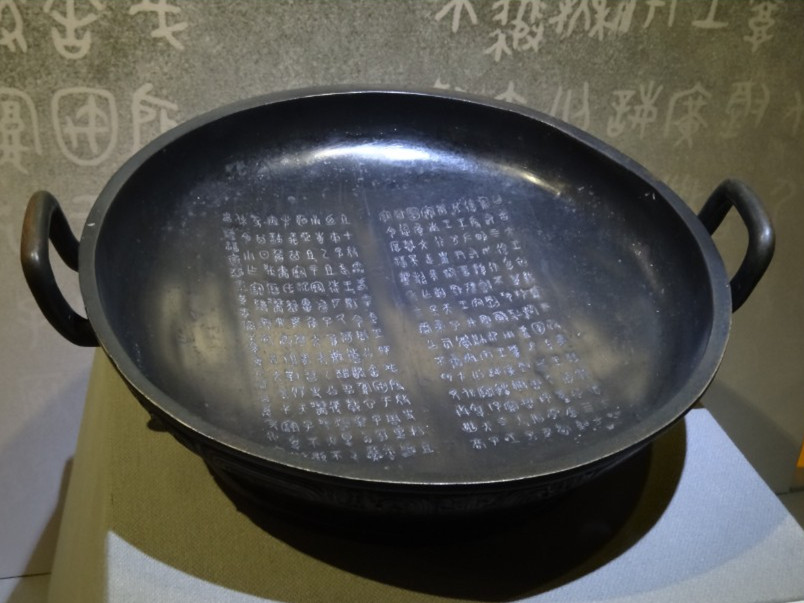
- The Shi Qiang pan, dated to King Gong of Zhou's reign.

King of the Zhou dynasty
- Reign: 922/17/15–900 BC
- Predecessor: King Mu of Zhou
- Successor: King Yi of Zhou
- Born: Ji Yihu (姬繄扈)
- Died: 900 BC
- Spouse: Wang Gui
- Issue: King Yi of Zhou
Names
- Ancestral name: Jī (姬); Given name: Yīhù (繄扈)
Posthumous name
- King Gong (共王 or 恭王 or 龔王)
- House: Ji
- Dynasty: Zhou (Western Zhou)
- Father: King Mu of Zhou

King Gong of Zhou

Posthumous name
- Chinese: 周恭王
- Literal meaning: The Respectful King of Zhou
Transcriptions
Standard Mandarin
- Hanyu Pinyin: Zhōu Gòng Wáng
- Wade–Giles: Chou Kong-wang; King Kong of Chou

King Gong of Zhou (Chinese: 周共王; pinyin: Zhōu Gòng Wáng; died 900 BC), personal name Ji Yihu, was the sixth king of China's Zhou dynasty. Estimated dates of his reign are 922–900 BC or 917/15–900.

== Reign ==
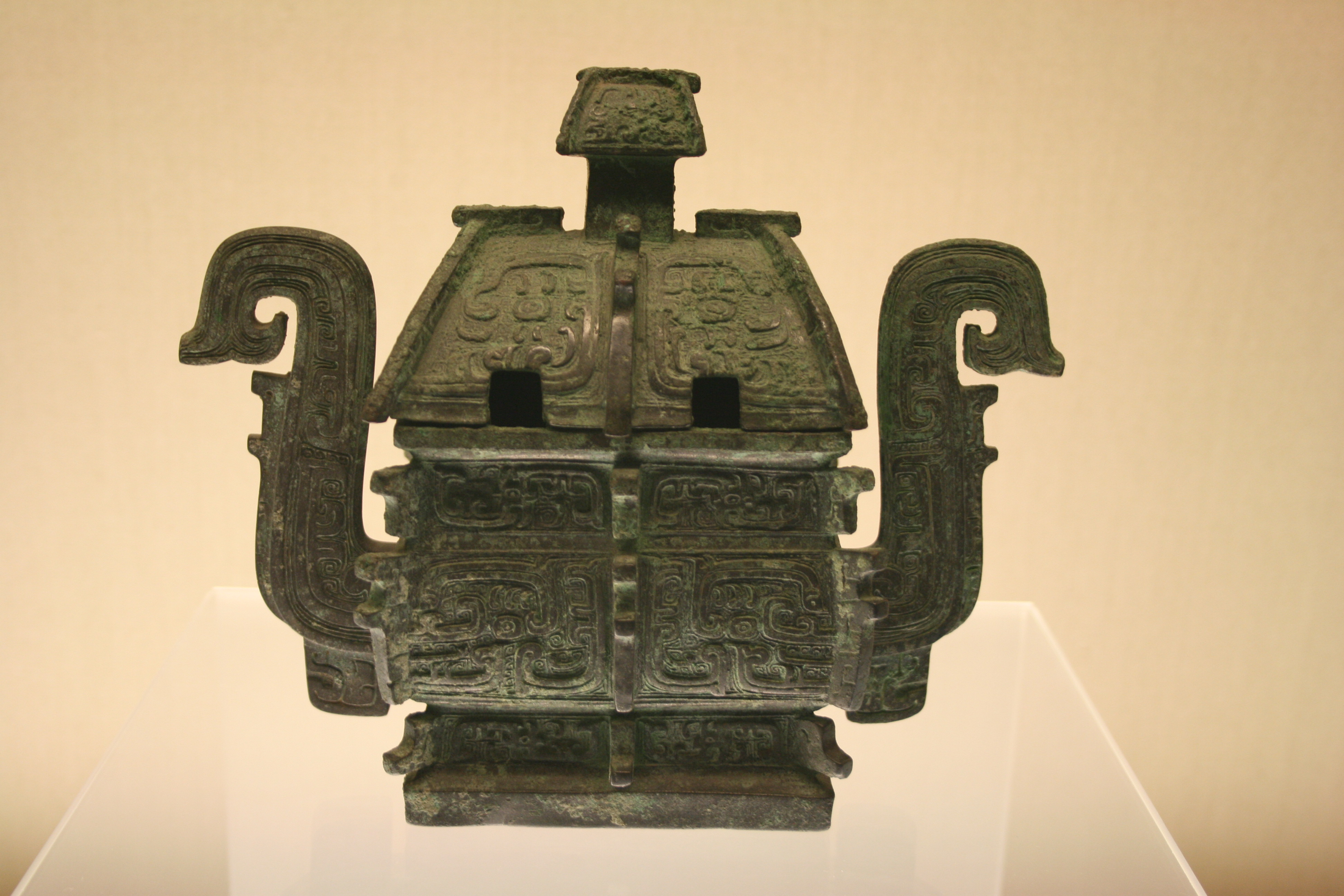
Bronze yi from King Gong's reign.

King Gong of Zhou ascended to the throne in the year 922 BC after his father King Mu of Zhou departed. Unlike some of his ancestors, he dedicated to developing economy and increasing his exchequer, instead of expanding territory or conquering others through wars. This is evidenced in several bronze inscriptions that have been attributed to him.

Much of King Gong's reign was shrouded in mystery until the excavation and study of Chinese ritual bronzes, the inscriptions of which shed light on many rulers. In the case of King Gong, many of these detail the social mobility of Qiu Wei (裘衛), who would engage in various transactions, of which the king would sometimes arbitrate. The first of these occurred in the king's third year, where he raised his banner in Fengjing, and Qiu Wei exchanged eighty peng (朋) of cowry money for ten fields. After going to the king's officials to ratify the transaction and transfer the land, he cast a he (盉) to honour his father, Hui Meng (惠孟).

During the fourth year of King Gong's reign, he met with an official named Shi You (師酉), who, after being given praised by the king, was given a leopard-skin coat and told to serve him. Shi You then kowtowed and had a ding cast, which King Gong ordered to be used to pursue filial piety and revere their parents.

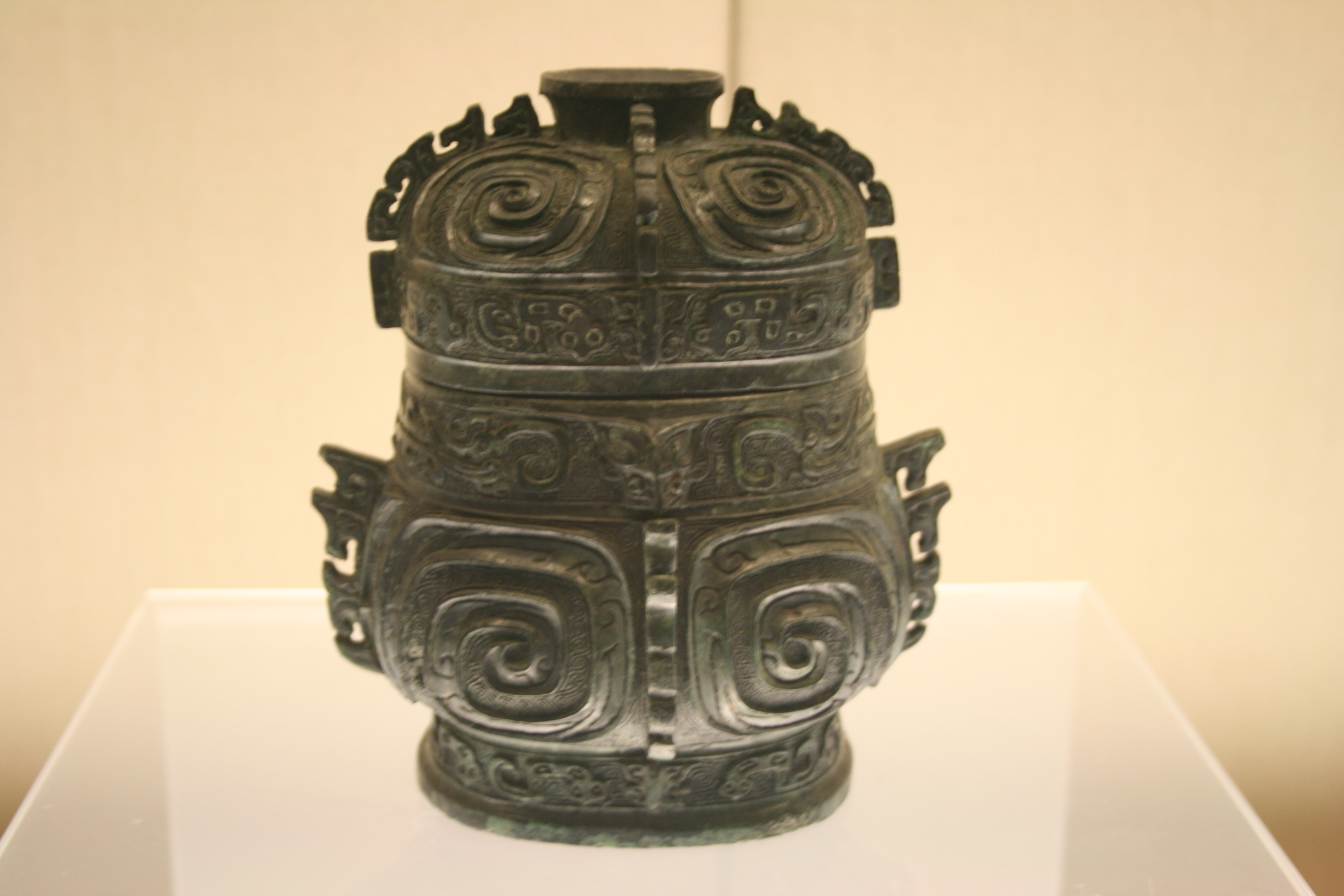
Bronze hu from King Gong's reign.

That same year, (Note: Sima Qian does not record the year of the destruction of the State of Mi, but the Bamboo Annals does.) according to one account carried by the Records of the Grand Historian, King Gong of Zhou initiated a war with the State of Mi (密) and destroyed it. When he was touring in State of Mi, three extremely beautiful women fled to the Duke, Duke Kang of Mi (密康公). Duke Kang's mother, of the Kui clan (隗氏), said to not take the women for himself and present them to King Gong, on the basis of him lacking status and virtue. However, the Duke took the women as his own concubines, which angered King Gong. He therefore invaded the state and sentenced that lord to death. The Bamboo Annals states that this happened in the fourth year of King Gong's reign, describing it as an annihilation. The Ming dynasty scholar He Kai (何楷) posited a theory that the Guofeng poem Choumou (綢繆) in the Classic of Poetry was a satire of Duke Mao of Mi.

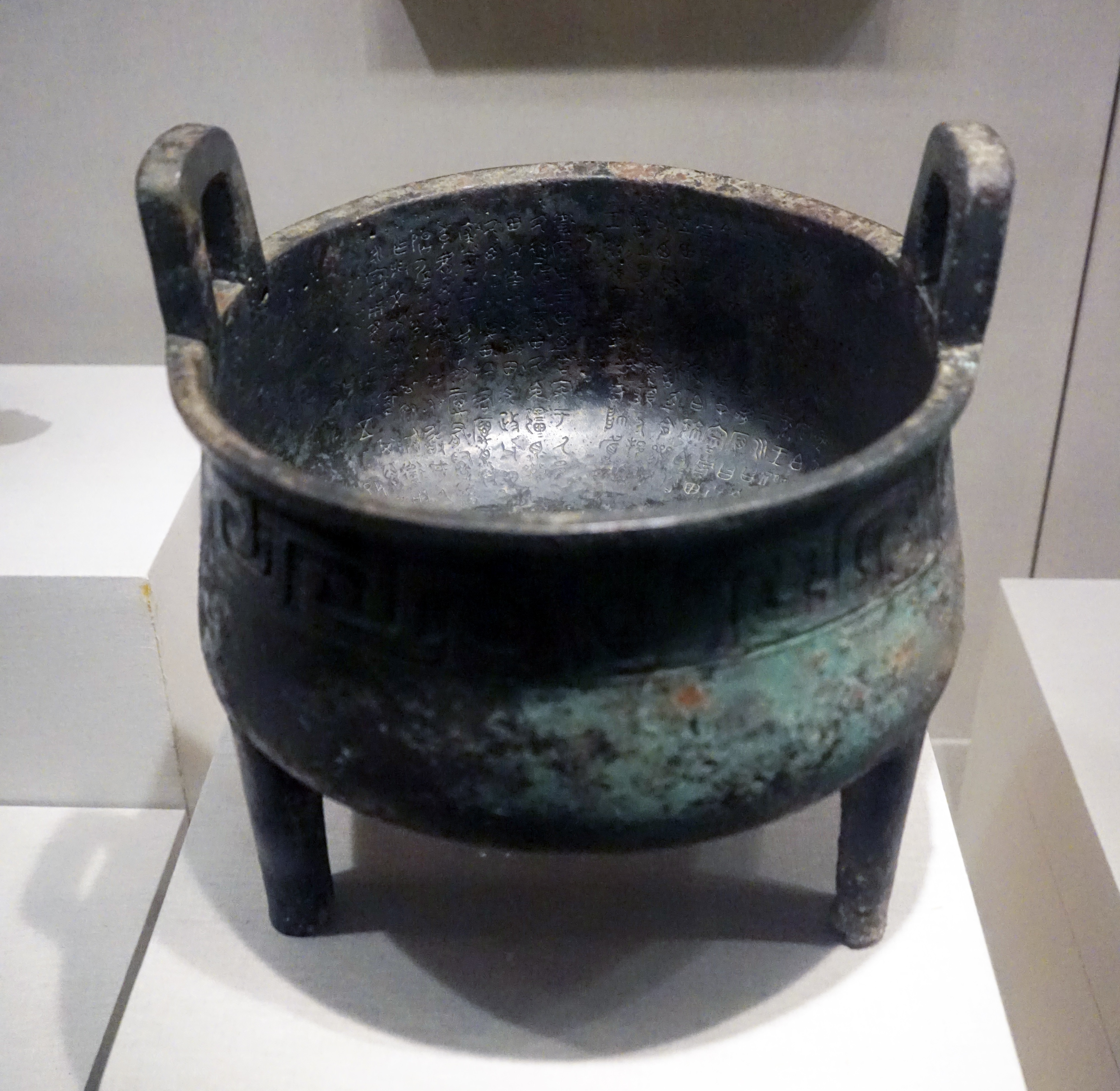
The Wu Si Wei ding, which details a land transaction.

After the war with the State of Mi, King Gong continued overseeing transactions for Qiu Wei. The first can be seen with the Wu Si Wei ding (五祀衛鼎), produced in his fifth year, which details a land-for-luxury transaction being made, specifically regarding agricultural fields. Another ding, this time the Jiunian Wei ding (九年衛鼎), also detailing Qiu Wei, records that during his ninth year, King Gong oversaw a complicated transaction in which an elaborate chariot with leather fittings was exchanged for a forest, and other gifts were also exchanged after the deal was made. Because the concern in this deal was about li (里), it has been argued that this may refer to residential areas. The Bamboo Annals also record that in the same year, King Gong sent an internal scribe, named Liang, to confer an order upon Earl Mao of Qian (毛伯遷).

During his 15th year, after building a new palace, King Gong met a scribe named Zhao Cao (趞曹) during a royal archery ritual at Shelu (射盧). Zhao Cao dared to respond to the king during this ritual, and was able to produce what is now called the Shiwunian Zhao Cao ding (十五年趞曹鼎) to symbolise their everlasting friendship.

In his 16th year, King Gong met with an individual named Shi Shan (士山), who entered the gate of the palace courtyard. The king ordered a scribe named Yin (尹) to read out an order to them. This order was to install a newly-enfeoffed Marquis of Zhong (仲), and stabilise the states of Ruo (鄀) and the Jingfang (荊方). The ruler of Ruo treated Shi Shan as a guest and rewarded them with cowry money and metals. Shi Shan then cast a pan (士山盘) to remember the event.

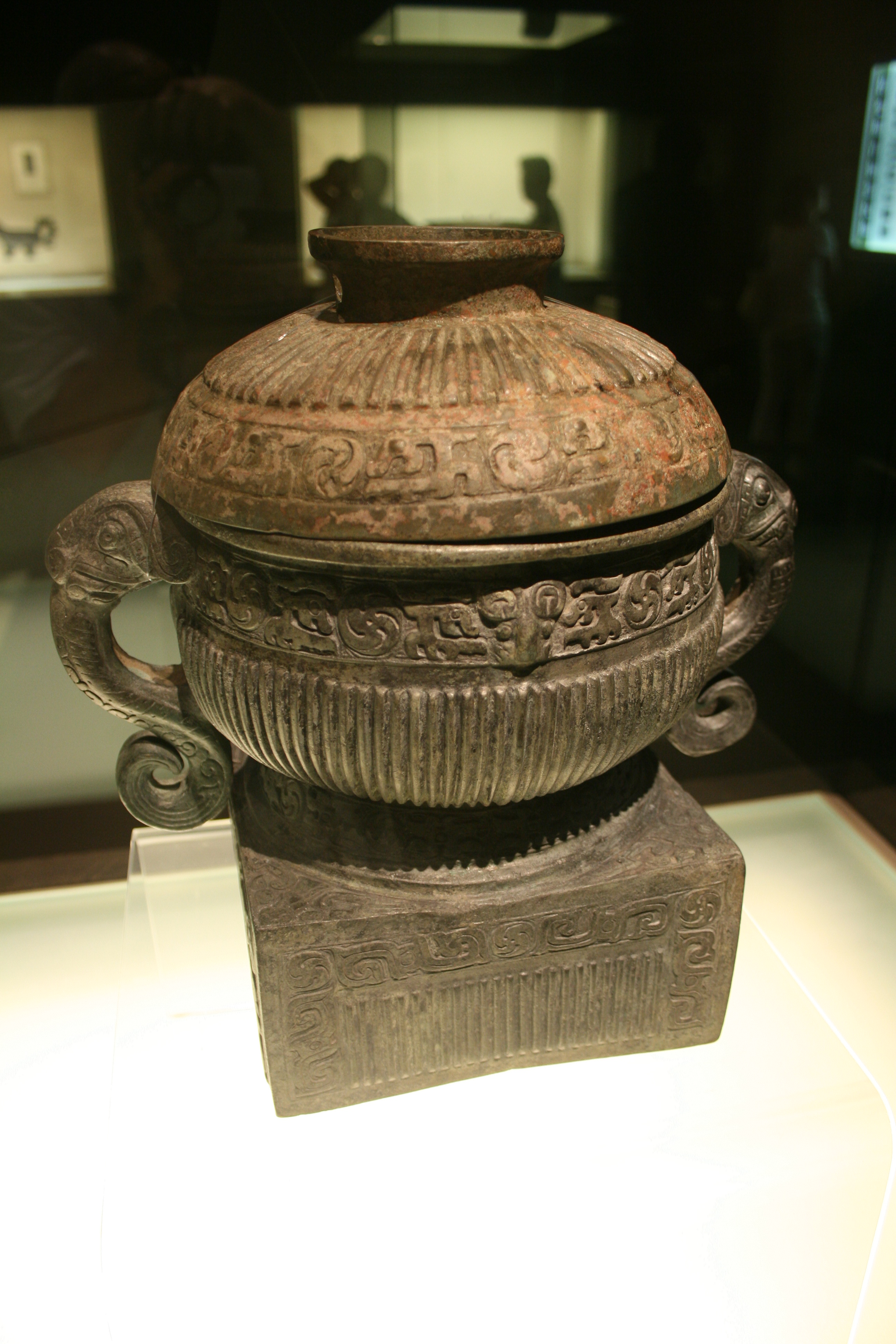
Bronze gui from King Gong's reign.

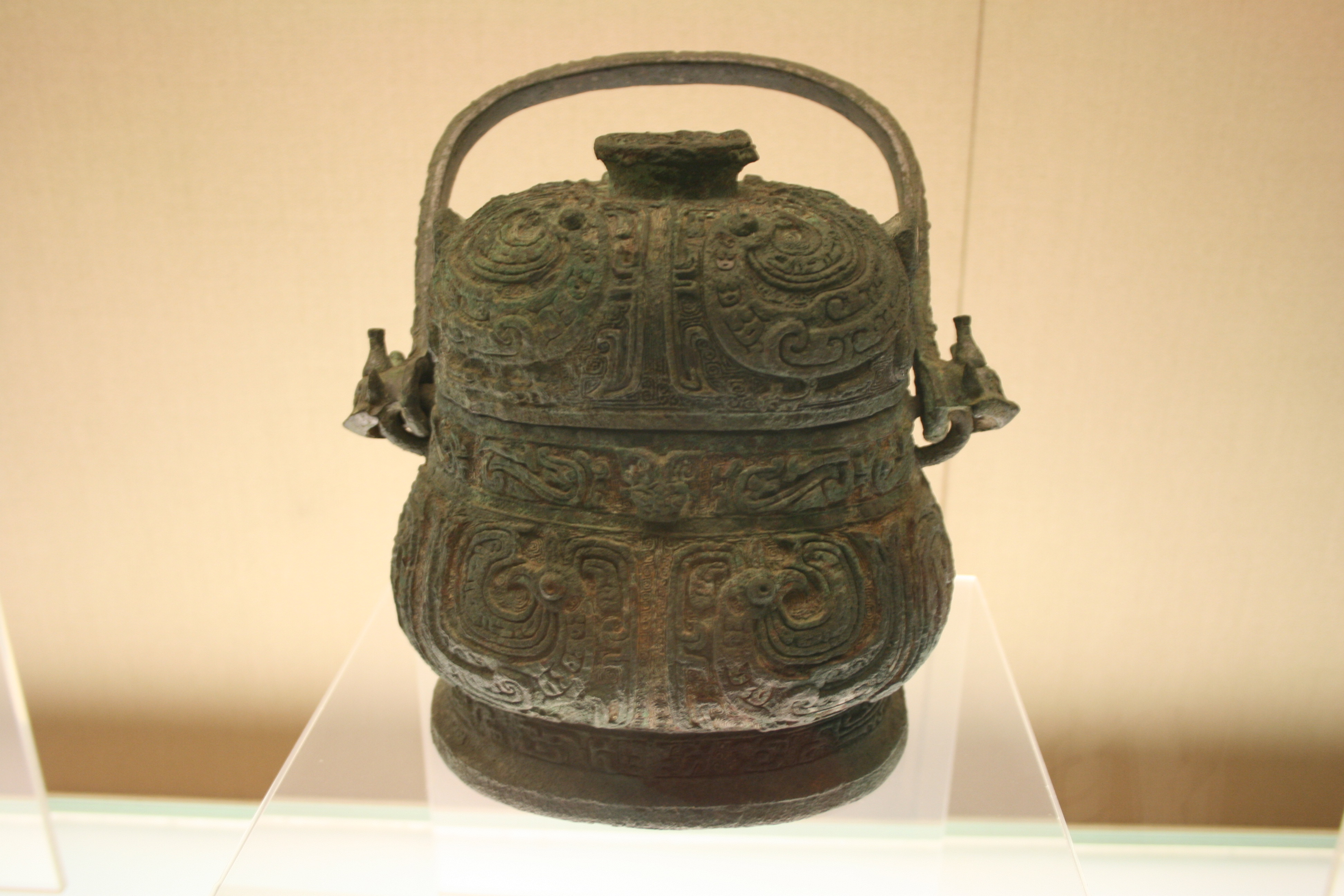
Bronze you from King Gong's reign.

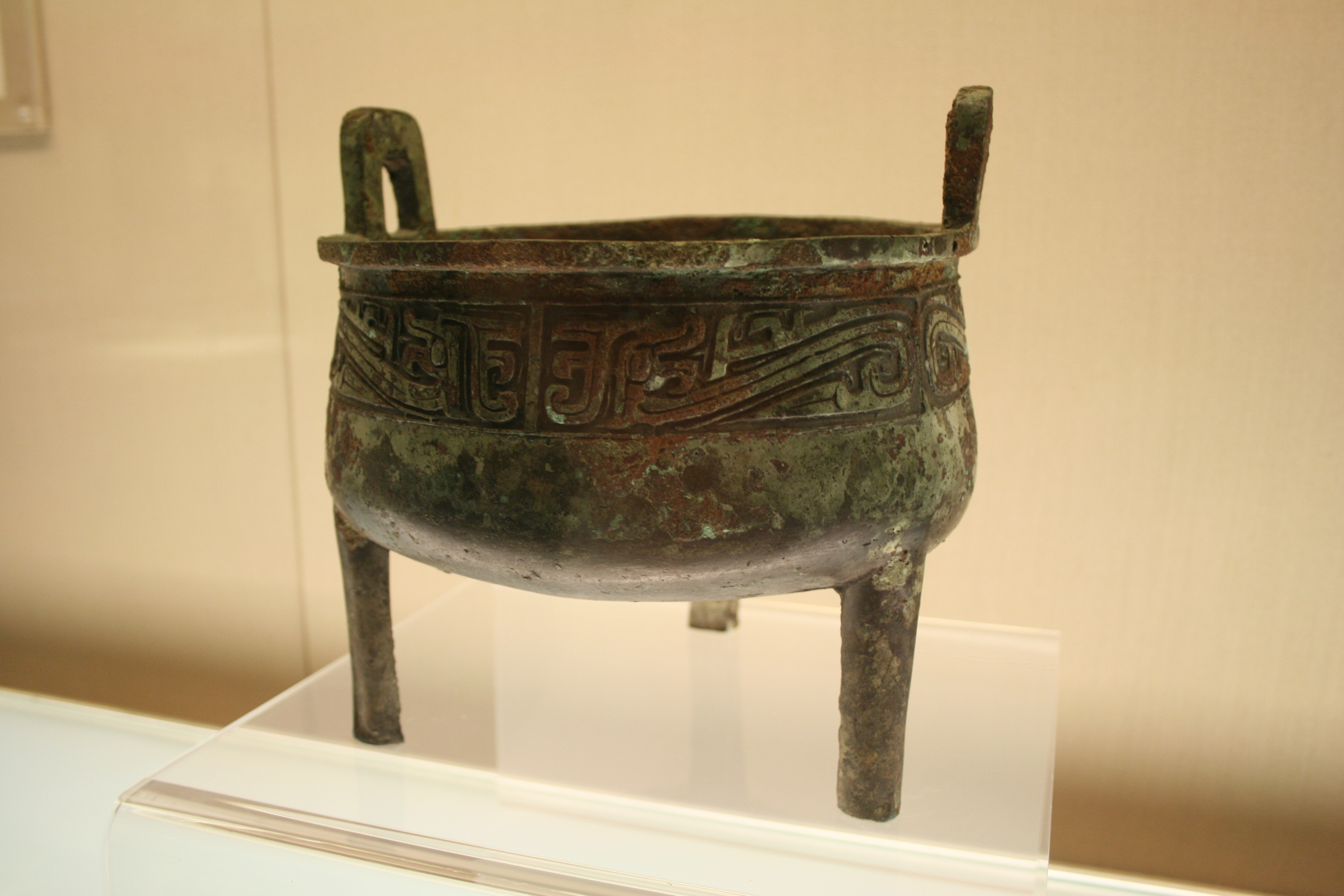
Bronze ding from King Gong's reign.

== Death ==
The date for King Gong's death is disputed. The Bamboo Annals states that he died in his 12th year, while Records of the Grand Historian states his reign length was around 25 years. The Xia-Shang-Zhou Chronology Project concludes it was around 23 years. Upon his death, King Gong passed the throne to his son King Yì of Zhou and departed peacefully in his own palace.

== Family ==
Queens:

- Wang Gui, of the Gui clan (王媯 媯姓)

Sons:

- Crown Prince Jian (太子囏; 899–892 BC), ruled as King Yì of Zhou from 899–892 BC

== See also ==
- Family tree of Chinese monarchs (ancient)

== Notes ==
King Gong of Zhou Zhou dynasty Died: 900 BC
Regnal titles
Preceded by King Mu of Zhou	King of China; 922–900 BC	Succeeded by King Yì of Zhou
