= Duke Mu of Shao =

Duke of Shao during King Xuan of Zhou's reign.

Duke Mu of Shao 召穆公

Duke of Shao
- Predecessor: You, Earl of Shao (召幽伯)
Names
- Family name: Ji (姬); Given name: Hu (虎); Clan name: Zhou (周)

Chinese name
- Chinese: 召穆公
Transcriptions
Standard Mandarin
- Hanyu Pinyin: Shào Mù Gōng

Ji Hu
- Chinese: 姬虎
Transcriptions
Standard Mandarin
- Hanyu Pinyin: Jī Hǔ

Duke Mu of Shao was the ruler of Shao during the reign of King Li of Zhou and King Xuan of Zhou. He is venerated in the Classic of Poetry for the role he played during the Gonghe Regency, and wrote at least one poem contained within.

== Name ==
Duke Mu's personal name is Hu (虎), so he is sometimes referred to as Duke Hu of Shao (召虎公). He is sometimes referred to as an Earl of Shao (召伯) as well.

== Life ==
=== During the Reign of King Li ===
Duke Mu of Shao was one of several ministers to King Li of Zhou, but over time grew weary of his rule. Around this time, the Western Zhou had become an increasingly unequal society, worsened by more expensive taxes and farmers being prohibited from profiting from their land. During the twelfth year of King Li's reign, the young crown prince Ji Jing took shelter in Duke Shao's home; when the king's soldiers swarmed his house, Duke Mu gave up his son as substitute, who was killed. Two years later, the Xianyun invaded Zongzhou (宗周), and Duke Mu fought the Jianman (荊蠻) in Luoyang. The Zuo Zhuan records Duke Mu as having written poems during this time, during the reign of Duke Xi of Lu, and protested against King Li's warmongering; said poem is recorded in the Classic of Poetry under Chang Di (常棣). As the King became increasingly totalitarian and demanded the people to stop protesting his affairs, Duke Mu famously stated that "stopping the people from talking is like stopping a river from flowing," which the king rejected. Duke Mu is credited with writing the poem Min Lu (民勞) in the Classic of Poetry in protest of King Li's excessive taxation, which decries the policies as robbery. Mao Heng also credits him with Dang (荡), a poem with significant lament over the state of Zhou, and Chang Wu (常武), a poem made in praise of King Xuan.

12 years later, the Compatriots Rebellion sparked off, which would end the reign of King Li; Duke Mu, together with Duke Ding of Zhou, installed King Xuan of Zhou as king, and He, Earl of Gong would serve as regent for several years. While Sima Qian interprets these events as Dukes Mu and Ding administering the state, modern evidence and excavated texts prove that He, Earl of Gong, was regent.

=== During the Reign of King Xuan ===
Eastern Jin epitaph featuring Song Gao, a poem credited to Duke Mu.

Bronze inscriptions show Duke Mu being active as an Earl during the fourth and fifth years of King Xuan of Zhou's reign, assisting in administration of land trade.

Poems in the Classic of Poetry, starting with Shu Miao (黍苗) praise Duke Mu for his taking of King Xuan's command to found a settlement in Xie (謝), which is followed Song Gao (崧高), where Duke Mu assists with making a home for an Earl of Shen in the capital.

Traditional interpretations of historiography posit that Duke Mu died during campaigns against the Huaiyi, though this is not certain. Jiang Han (江漢) in the Classic of Poetry venerates Duke Mu for this campaign.
