= Gui (vessel) =

Type of Chinese vase-like container

- gui in bronze script
- Chinese: 簋
Transcriptions
Standard Mandarin
- Hanyu Pinyin: guǐ
- Wade–Giles: kuei^{3}
Middle Chinese
- Middle Chinese: kˠiuɪX
Old Chinese
- Zhengzhang: *kʷrɯwʔ

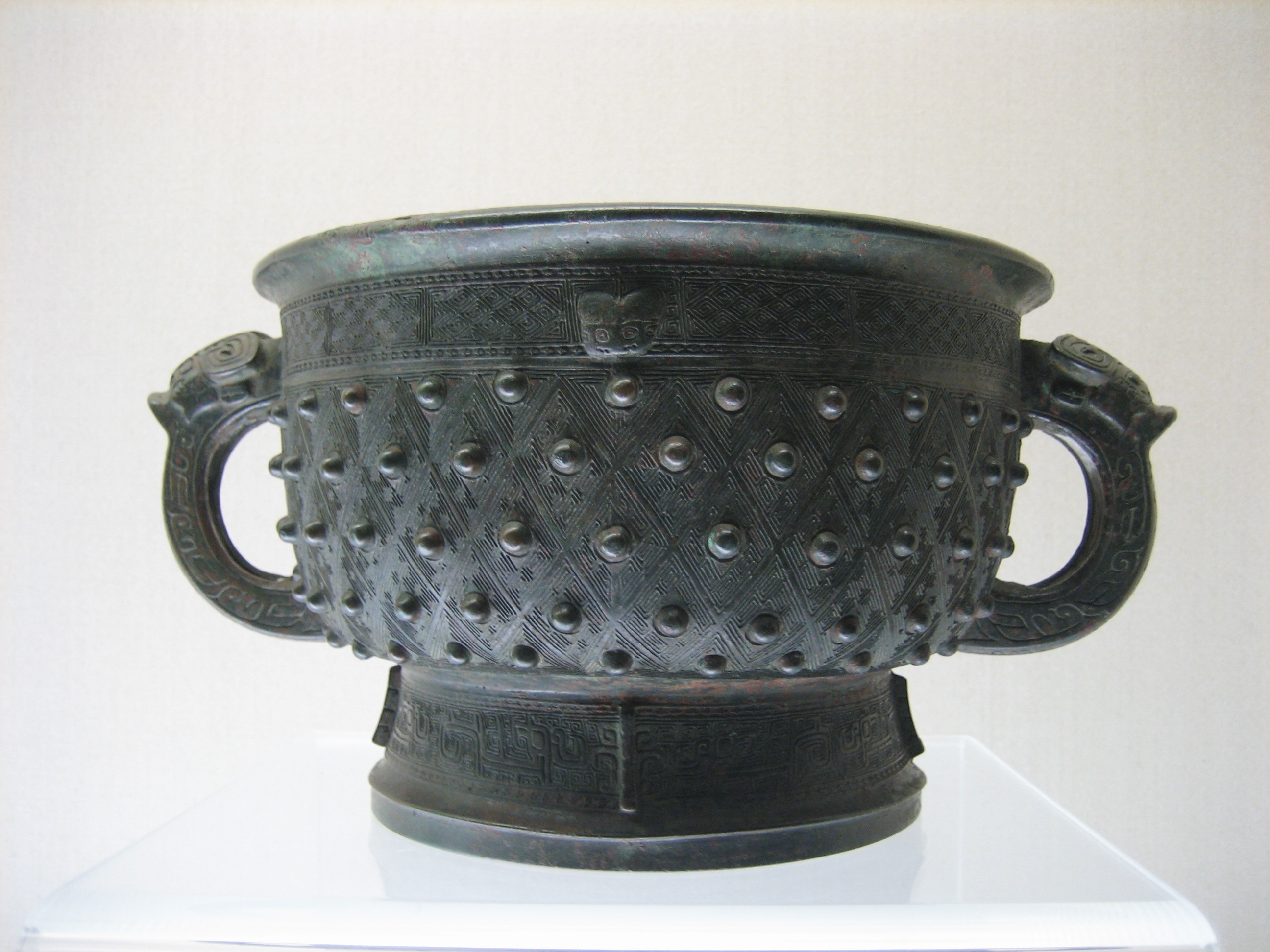
Shang dynasty bronze gui

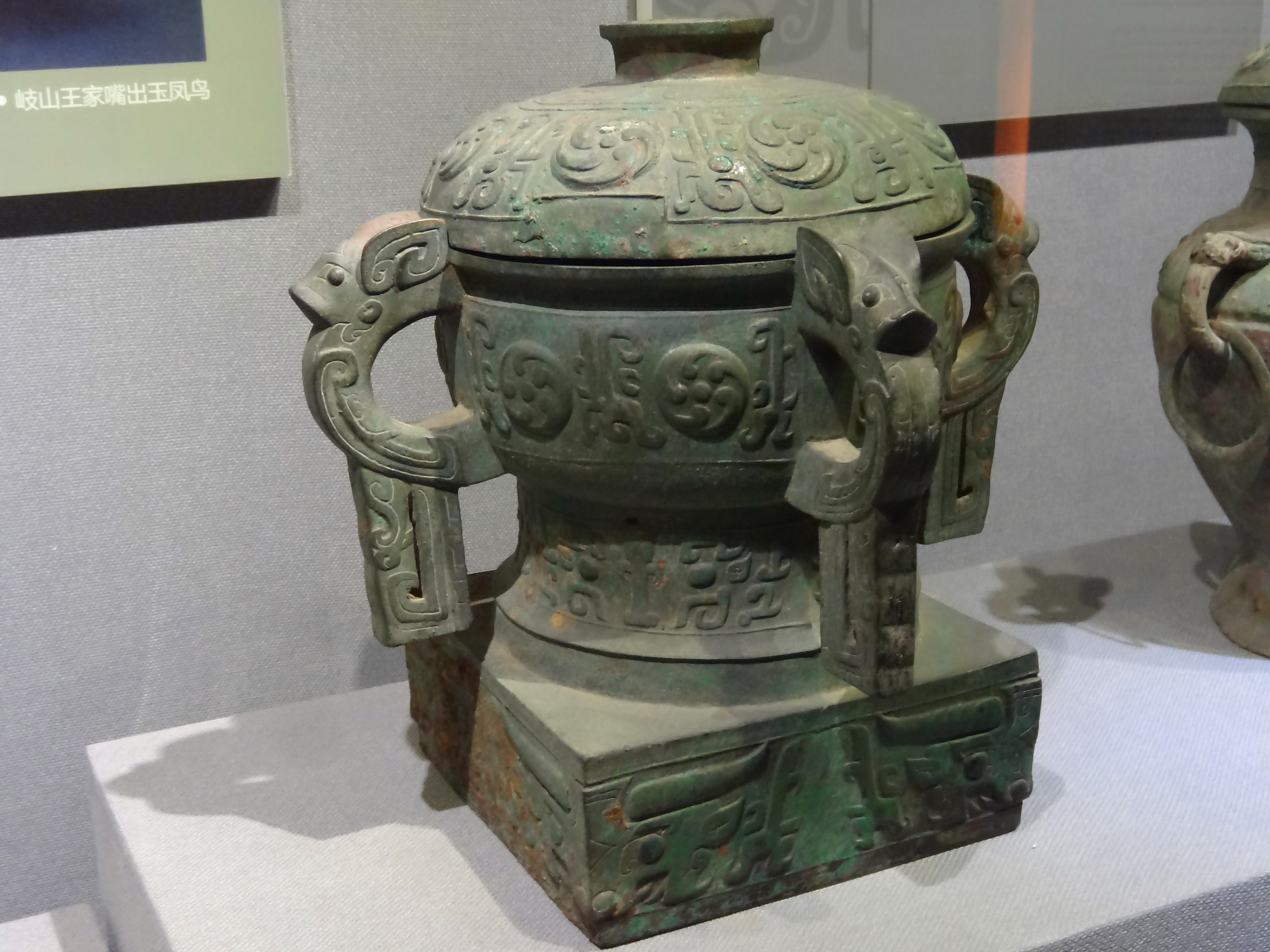
Gui with four handles, a cover and a square base

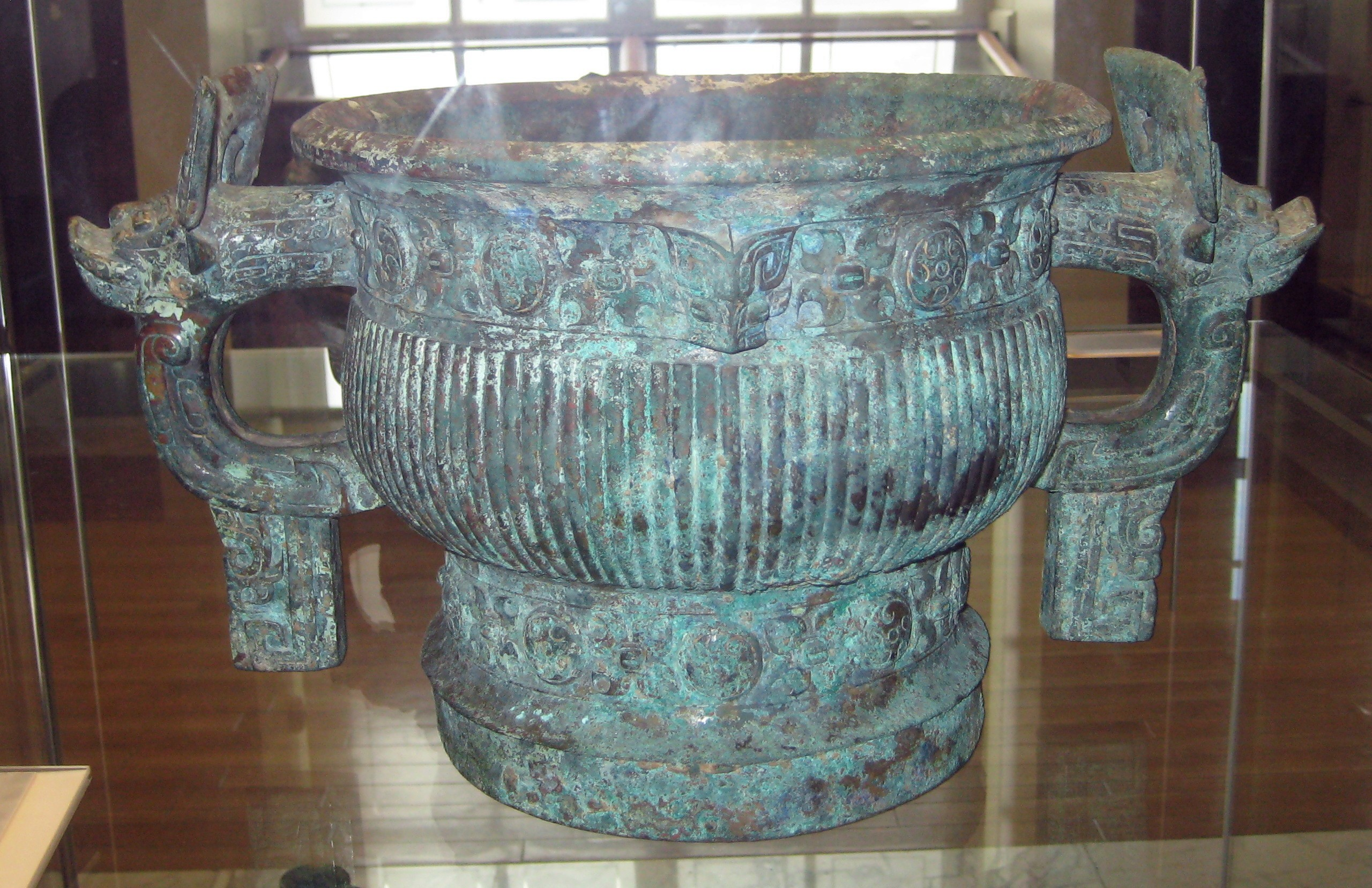
The "Kang Hou gui", early Western Zhou (11th century BC). British Museum, London.

A gui is a type of bowl-shaped ancient Chinese ritual bronze vessel used to hold offerings of food, probably mainly grain, for ancestral tombs. As with other shapes, the ritual bronzes followed early pottery versions for domestic use, and were recalled in later art in both metal, pottery, and sometimes stone. The shape changed somewhat over the centuries but constant characteristics are a circular form (seen from above), with a rounded, wide, profile or shape from the side, standing on a narrower rim or foot. There are usually two, or sometimes four, handles, and there may be a cover or a square base (or both).

The Kang Hou gui, an 11th-century BC example in the British Museum was chosen as object 23 in the A History of the World in 100 Objects.

The British Museum bowl inscription on the inside of the bowl tells that King Wu's brother, Kang Hou, who was the Duke of Kang and Mei Situ were given territory in Wei. The inscription relates a rebellion by remnants of the Shang, and its defeat by the Zhou, which helps us to date it. Because historians know exactly when this unsuccessful rebellion against the Zhou dynasty took place then the bowl can be dated very accurately.

== See also ==
- Song gui - a gui, held by the Yale University Art Gallery describing the appointment of an official "Song" by the King of Zhou.
