= Guoji Zibai pan =

Ancient Chinese bronze vessel

- 虢季子白盘
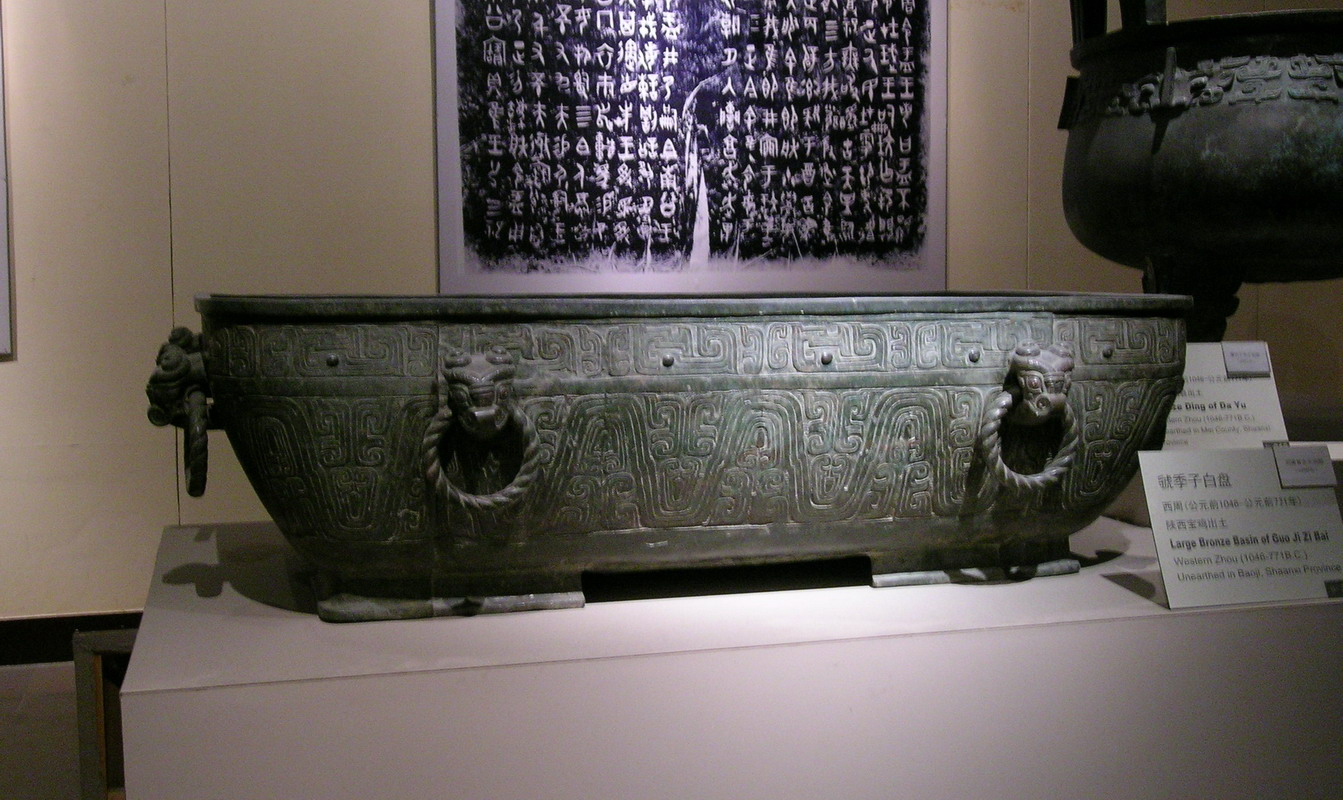
- The Guoji Zibai pan is exhibited in the National Museum of China.
- Material: Bronze
- Length: 137.2-centimetre (54.0 in)
- Height: 39.5-centimetre (15.6 in)
- Width: 86.5-centimetre (34.1 in)
- Weight: 215.3-kilogram (475 lb)
- Created: 816 BC
- Discovered: Daoguang period (1821–1851); Guochuansi, Chencang District of Baoji, Shaanxi
- Present location: National Museum of China

The Guoji Zibai pan (simplified Chinese: 虢季子白盘; traditional Chinese: 虢季子白盤; pinyin: Guójì Zǐbaí Pán) is an ancient Chinese bronze rectangular pan vessel from the Western Zhou dynasty (1046 BC–771 BC). Excavated in Chencang District of Baoji, Shaanxi during the Daoguang era (1821–1851) of the Qing dynasty (1644–1911), it is on display in the National Museum of China in Beijing.

The Guoji Zibai pan is the largest known bronze plate in the world. It enjoys the reputation of the best bronzeware of the Western Zhou dynasty (1046 BC–771 BC). The Guoji Zibai pan, the San Family Plate (散氏盤), and the Mao Gong ding, are known as the "Three Important Bronzewares of the Western Zhou dynasty".

== Description ==
The rectangular Guoji Zibai pan resembles a bathtub. It is 39.5-centimetre (15.6 in) high, 137.2-centimetre (54.0 in) long, and 86.5-centimetre (34.1 in) wide. It weighs 215.3 kilograms (475 lb). The four corners are regular fillets and the four feet are all in rectangular shape, and hidden at the bottom of the plate making the mouth of the plate appear large while the bottom small. On each wall outside of the plate, there are two beast heads with rings in the mouths, and decorative patterns in the shape of ware band.

== Inscription ==
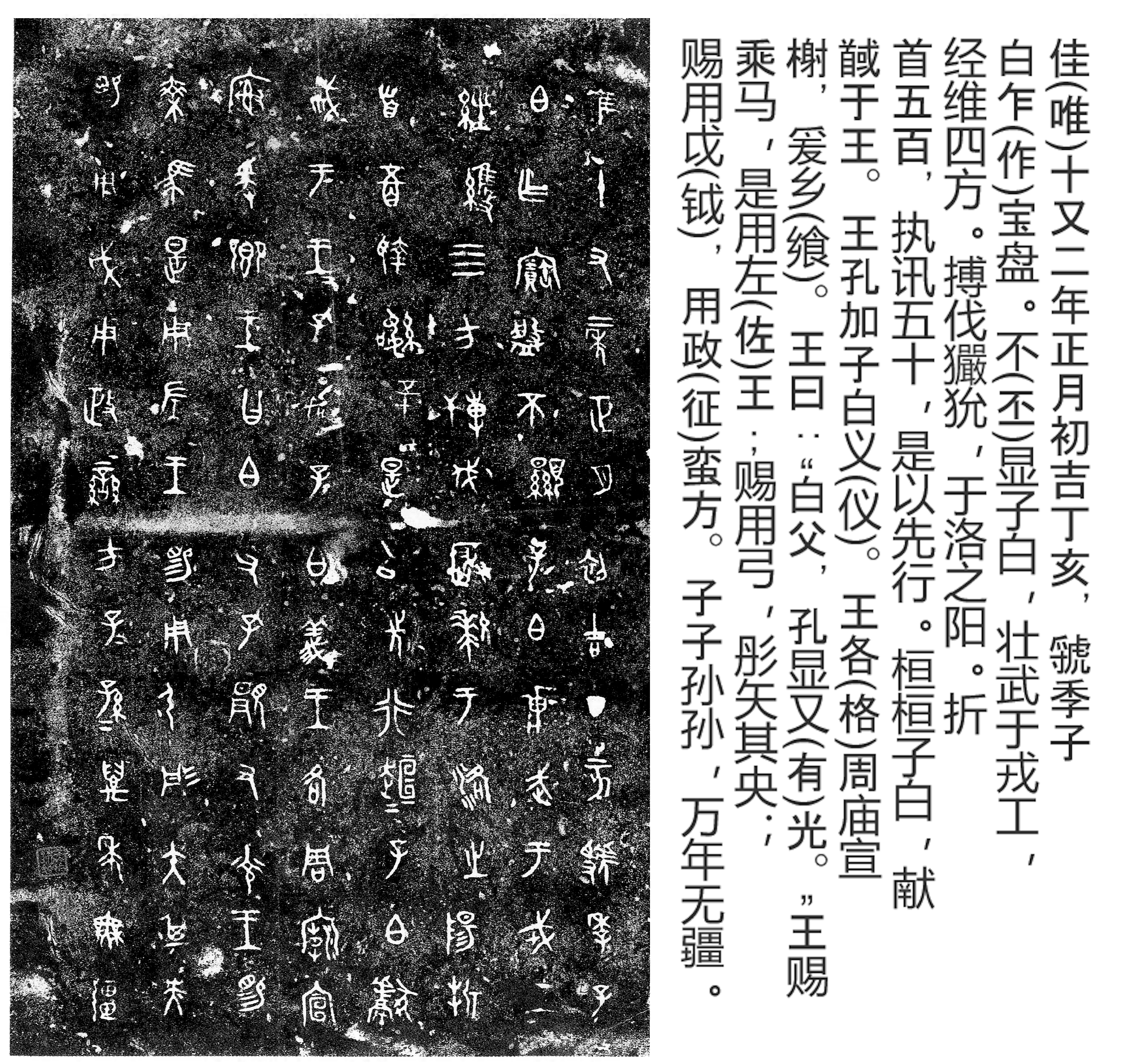
Guoji Zibai pan inscription with transcription

According to the inscription, the Guoji Zibai pan was cast by Guoji Zibai (虢季子白), a nobleman in the Western Guo State (1046 BC–687 BC) in the Western Zhou dynasty (1046 BC–771 BC). The plate was cast in 816 BC, the 12th year of King Xuan of Zhou. Guoji was a major branch of the Guo lineage that ruled the Western Guo, and Zibai was his courtesy name.

According to the inscription on the plate, in the 12 year of King Xuan of Zhou, also the year of 816 BC, Guoji Zibai was appointed by King Xuan to lead the army to battle with the nomadic tribe Xianyun in the north shore of Luo River, and gained a complete victory, killing 500 enemies and taking 50 as prisoners. Guoji Zibai cut the enemy's ears off and offered it to the King Xuan, King Xuan held a grand ceremony to honor his achievement and bestowed him a lot of horses and weapons to praise merit of him. Guoji Zibai specially cast the bronze ware to memorize the military operation and honor.

The plate was cast in 816 BC, and the writing technique of the inscription on the plate was very similar to those of the Classic of Poetry, which was the earliest collection of poetry in China.

== Function ==
In ancient China, water held in small plates was used for washing hands and faces, and in large plates it was used for baths. The rings on the outside walls of the plate were probably designed for carrying the plate to pour water conveniently. the Guoji Zibai pan was large, heavy and inconvenient to use in daily life. It seemed that it was more suitable to hold things in a large volume, just like Jian (鉴; 鑒), which was used to hold ice cube in ancient China. According to the set of etiquette at that time, when a high-ranking official died, his body should stay in the mortuary for seven days. In summer, ice was a must to prevent the body from decaying. Therefore, maybe the plate was a container used for holding ice cubes. But there has been no authoritative final conclusion about the exact usage of the plate in the academic circle.

== Discovery ==
=== Qing dynasty ===
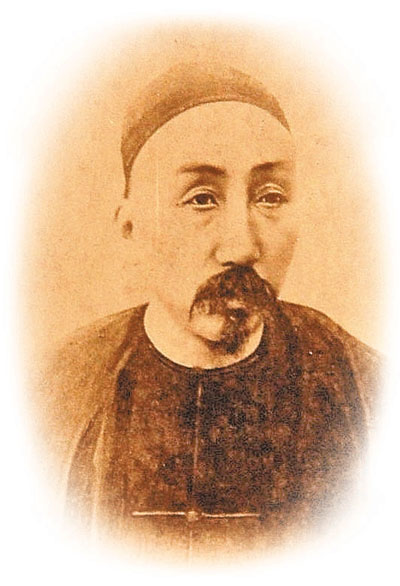
Liu Mingchuan (1836–1896), the third owner of the Guoji Zibai pan who protected it between 1864 and 1896

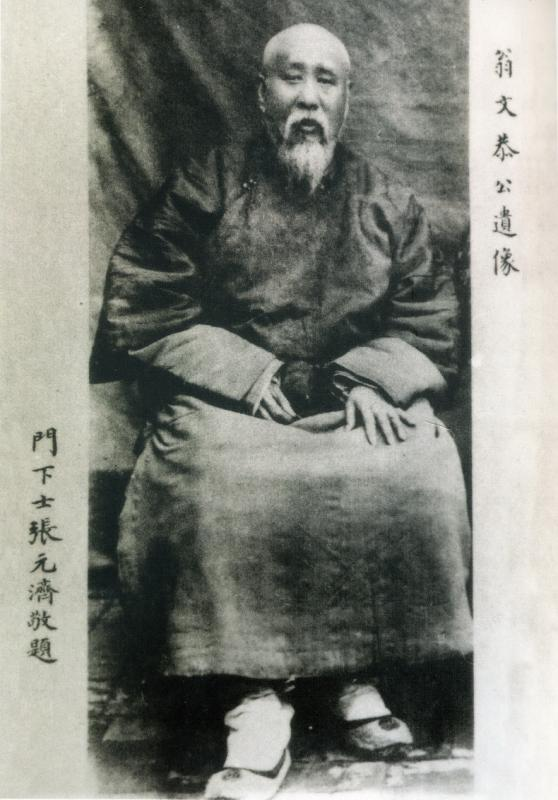
Weng Tonghe (1830–1904), scholar and Minister of Revenue, who coveted the Guoji Zibai pan

According to Prefecture Records of Luzhou (《庐州府志》), the Guoji Zibai pan was unearthed at Guochuansi of Baoji, Shaanxi, in the Daoguang period (1821–1851) of the Qing dynasty (1644–1911). Xu Xiejun (徐燮钧), the then magistrate of Mei County, purchased the plate for 5,000-gram (180 oz) silver from a local peasant. And he brought the plate to his house "Tianyou Hall" (天佑堂). In April 1860, it fell into the hands of Chen Kunshu and became the treasure of the Mansion of the Prince Protector.

In May 1864, namely the 3rd year of Tongzhi period of Qing dynasty, Liu Mingchuan (1836–1896), general of the Huai Army, led the troops of the Qing Empire to fight against the Taiping Army, and finally liberated Changzhou. When Liu moved into the mansion, his soldiers didn't know the plate and used it as a manger. One night when reading a book under the oil lamp, Liu heard clear metal clanks from out of the window. All was quiet at dead of night, so the clanks sounded clear and loud. Liu came to the stable following the sounds, and saw that a horse was eating grass with the bronze rings on the headstall hitting the manger from time to time to make the clanks. Liu was so curious that he bent to look carefully with the lantern, and found the manger wide and deep with fuzzy decorative patterns on its four sides. Liu tried to push the manger but failed. It was very unusual and he decided to check it out after dawn. The next day he ordered his attendants to carry out the manger and wash it. The bronze ware was very exquisite and Liu was very fond of it. He immediately sent his trusted followers to transport the manger to his home in Hefei, Anhui. Liu specially invited Huang Congmo (黄从默; 黃從默), who was familiar with ancient Chinese characters, to help him research the bronze ware. Huang told him that most of the bronze plates discovered in the past were round, that rectangular bronze ware were very rare, and that such a large and rectangular plate was even more scarce and even might be the only one of its kind. Also, the inscription clearly showed that the bronze plate was cast by Guoji Zibai of Western Guo. After Liu understood the story of the manger, he decided to protect it. Liu specially built an exquisite pavilion in his house, which he named "Plate Pavilion" (盘亭; 盤亭) to preserve the plate. Huang made a piece of rubbing from its inscription and made a lot of copies. He sold it on the market. Weng Tonghe (1830–1904), a collector and teacher of the Guangxu Emperor, wanted to buy the plate but Liu refused. Weng told the Empress Dowager Cixi on Liu Mingchuan and complained about that. But Liu's superior Li Hongzhang explained that. Empress Dowager Cixi decreed to bestow the plate to Liu Mingchuan. In 1885, he was appointed as the first provincial governor of Taiwan by the Qing Dynasty government, a position he held for almost ten years until his retirement. From then on he lived a reclusive life and didn't care about national affairs any more. The plate became his spiritual ballast in his declining years. In 1894, the Qing army were routed in the First Sino-Japanese War and the Qing government was forced to sign the "Treaty of Shimonoseki". When hearing the news, Liu was so furious that he became ill suddenly and died with indignation. Before he died, he told his descendents again and again that the plate was a national treasure and they should protect, even of it risked their own lives.

=== Republic era ===
In 1911, the Xinhai Revolution was broke out, China was torn by warlords. Some warlords began to covet all kinds of national and cultural treasures that they knew and heard of. The Guoji Zibai pan in the Liu Family was no exception. In May 1933, the then governor of Anhui Liu Zhenhua came to Liu's home in the name of visiting the descendants of Liu Mingchuan. When meeting Liu Suzeng (刘肃曾; 劉肅曾), the fourth-generation son of Liu Mingchuan. Liu Zhenhua first flattered him with a beaming face and then he changed the topic, saying that he want to see the plate. Liu Suzeng calmly said that his ancestors did actually collect a plate, but they had never seen it. Liu Zhenhua suddenly turned hostile and commanded his soldiers to search the house. They searched everywhere but found nothing there. Liu Zhenhua sent spies to watch every movement of the Liu Family in the hope of finding where the plate was. The Liu Family spent the next four year in fear.

In 1937, after the Marco Polo Bridge Incident happened, the Japanese army soon colonized northern China. After occupying Hefei, the Japanese army set a stronghold less than 3-kilometre (1.9 mi) away from the Liu Family's residence. Soon after, they sent a message to the Liu Family that they would like to exchange a golden plate of the same size for the Guoji Zibai pan. Liu Suzeng answered immediately that they did not have any treasures and if they did, they did not want to be unworthy descendants or the bad apples and traitors of the country to sell it to foreigners. Liu Suzeng thought it over and over and finally hit upon a good idea: they dug a big hole in their yard and buried the plate in the hole and then planted a little locust tree on it. In order to avoid danger, the Liu Family moved to other places with some personal belongings that night to seek asylum for a while. When the Japanese heard this, they made a wide and extensive search of the Liu's house but found nothing. Finally, they set a fire on more than thirty buildings and then left.

After the surrender of Japan, the Liu Family returned home. Li Pinxian (1892–1987), a Kuomintang general and then governor of Anhui, ordered Liu Suzeng to hand over the plate, but Liu refused. A few days later, Li Pinxian deliberately said that Liu had stolen a box full of gold bars, and forced Liu to write an IOU. The Liu Family had to flee their home to seek asylum once again. Li Pinxian came to Liu's house with his troops and they looked around the house. They also dug up the yard to a depth of three feet but found nothing.

=== People's Republic era ===
In October 1949, after the establishment of the Government of the People's Republic of China, the Ministry of Culture asked officials from all over the country to rescue and find cultural and national treasures and relics that were scattered around the people. Wu Guichang (吴桂长; 吳桂長), chief of the CPC Feixi County Committee, heard the news that the Guoji Zibai pan was being preserved in the Liu Family. Wu went to Liu's house many times and asked Liu Suzeng to donate the cultural relic to the country. Guo Chongyi (郭崇毅), a local member of the Chinese Democratic League, came to Liu's home with a document from the Central Government. After reading the document and talking with Guo Chongyi, Liu Suzeng decided to donate the treasure to the country along with a bronze drum of the Three Kingdoms period (220–280) together. On February 28, 1950, the Liu Family officially donated the plate to the Ministry of Culture. The government awarded Liu a certificate of praise and honor. Until then, the Guoji Zibai pan had accompanied the Liu Family for eighty-six years and been passed down four generations. The Ministry of Culture gave the treasure to the National Museum of Chinese History. Later, the National Museum of Chinese History gave the relic to the National Museum of China. The Guoji Zibai pan has always been kept there ever since.

== See also ==
- List of Chinese cultural relics forbidden to be exhibited abroad
