= Queen Jiang (King Xuan of Zhou) =

Spouse of King Xuan of Zhou

Queen Jiang (Chinese: 姜后), or Qi Jiang, was the consort of King Xuan of Zhou and the mother of King You of Zhou. She was a daughter of the duke of Qi, and as such a member of the Jiang clan which traditionally provided brides to marry the princes of the Zhou dynasty.

== Legend ==
Queen Jiang was reportedly a wise and virtuous queen whose actions advanced the well-being of the nation. One story mentioned in the book Biographies of Exemplary Women tells that King Xuan became accustomed to go to bed early in the afternoon and awakening late in the morning. His consorts awaited him in his bedroom where he lay with them every night, largely neglecting state affairs while the kingdom sank into crisis. Once Queen Jiang left his room in the morning, before he had woken up. She removed the pins of her hair and unmade her hair bun. Then she went to the hall of penitence and asked a maiden to summon the king with the following message:

"I am incompetent, and my dissolute heart has manifested itself today once more. I, on multiple occasions, have distracted my ruler and made him be late to meet with the court ministers. If a man takes great delight of his women, he soon forgets about others and becomes addicted to extravagance, and thus disorder begins. This disorder has its start in me. I, your servant, therefore request that the blame for this crisis be put upon me and that I alone suffer all due consequences."

Upon listening to this plea, the king became ashamed and acknowledged the queen's worries even though she did not utter a word of criticism against him. Thus the king was moved by her humility and sacrifice and immediately corrected his ways in order to stop her from demanding a punishment. He even was quoted saying: "I am not a ruler of the most virtuous, but it is impossible not to recognize that nobody but myself is responsible for everything."

King Xuan died in 781 BC and King You ascended to the throne. Queen Jiang soon fell into a deep depression and died shortly afterwards. This contributed to young King You's disorderly behavior which led to the fall of the Western Zhou dynasty in 771 BC.
