= King Xuan of Zhou =

King of the Zhou dynasty (d. 782 BC)

King Xuan of Zhou 周宣王
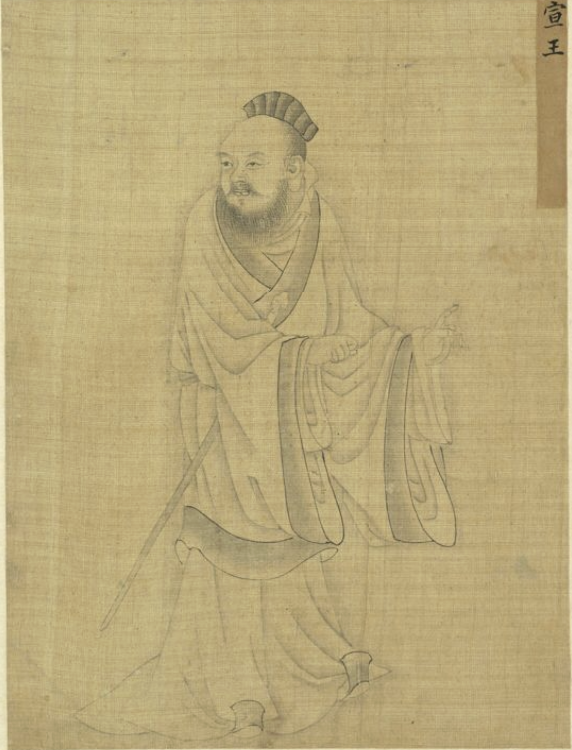

King of the Zhou dynasty
- Reign: 827/25 – 782 BC
- Predecessor: He, Earl of Gong (共伯和); Gonghe Regency
- Successor: King You of Zhou
- Regent: He, Earl of Gong
- Died: 782 BC
- Spouse: Queen Jiang
- Issue: King You of Zhou; King Xie of Zhou
- House: Ji
- Dynasty: Zhou
- Father: King Li of Zhou
- Mother: Shen Jiang

Chinese name
- Chinese: 周宣王
Transcriptions
Standard Mandarin
- Hanyu Pinyin: Zhōu Xuān Wáng
- Wade–Giles: Chou^{1} Hsüan^{1} Wang^{2}

Personal name
- Chinese: 姬靜 (Note: Alternatively 姬靜.)
Transcriptions
Standard Mandarin
- Hanyu Pinyin: Jī Jìng

King Xuan of Zhou, personal name Ji Jing, was the 11th king of the Western Zhou dynasty and the penultimate one before the change to the Eastern Zhou period. His reign has been reconstructed to be 827/25 – 782 BC. He worked to restore royal authority after the Gonghe Regency led by He, Earl of Gong. His son, King You, would be the last king of the Western Zhou.

The Stone Drums of Qin were long mistakenly ascribed to King Xuan.

== Reign ==
=== Gonghe Regency ===
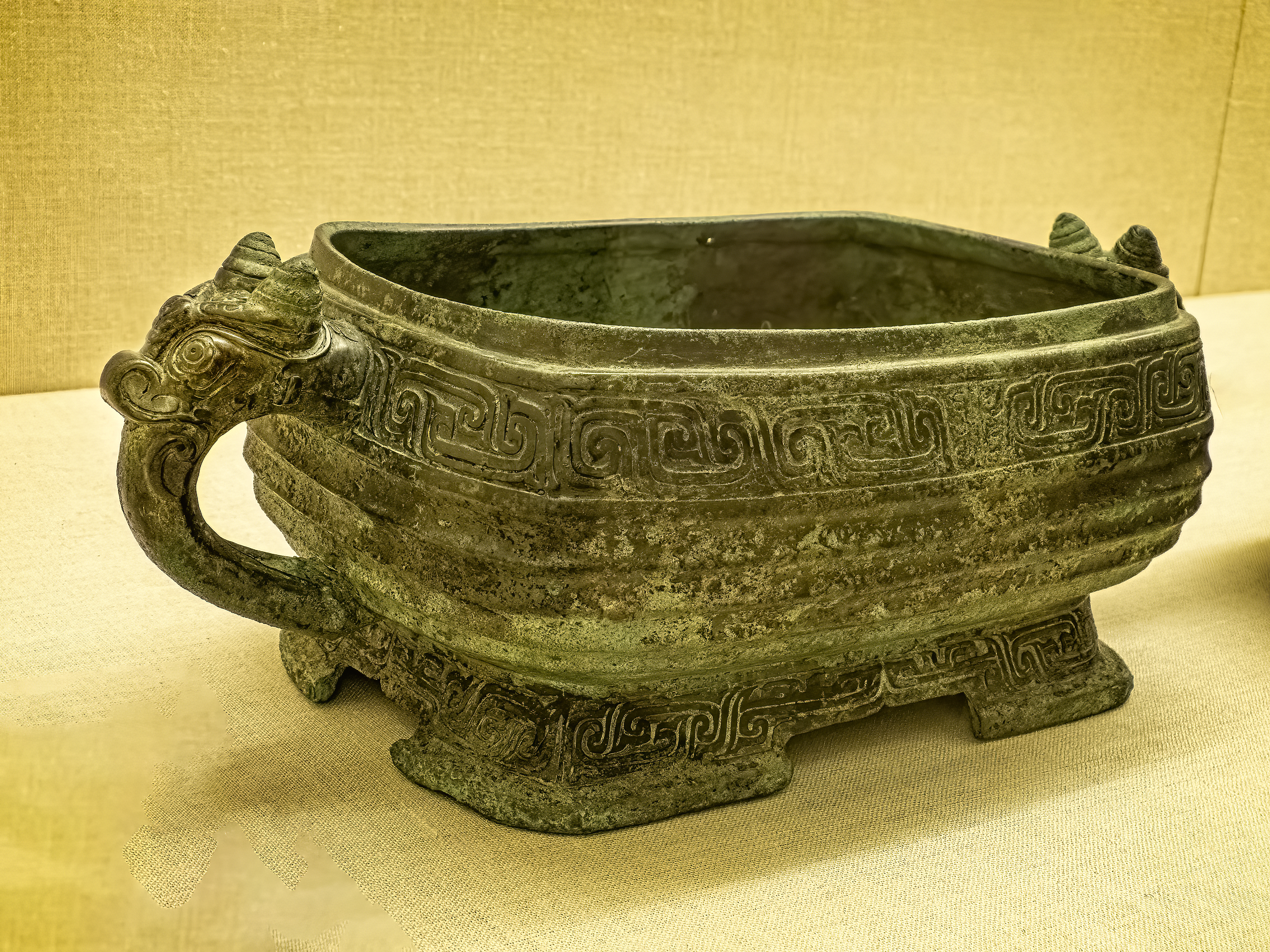
Bronze food vessel from the era of King Xuan.

King Xuan was born in a troublesome time in the Western Zhou dynasty. King Li of Zhou had imposed serious taxes on his people and treated them with contempt. 12 years of King Li's abusive behaviour culminated in the young prince fleeing to the residence of Duke Mu of Shao, whose residence would be swarmed by those trying to retrieve the boy. Duke Mu would send out his own son as substitute, allowing the crown prince to escape as his son was killed. After a period of decadence for the upper-class, the Zhou people rebelled and exiled him to Zhi (彘) for his crimes. Thereafter, Zhou was ruled by He, Earl of Gong in an era called the Gonghe Regency. (Note: While Sima Qian claims the Dukes of Shao and Zhou at the time held regency, modern research has shown this was a wrong interpretation. See citation. Likewise, the narrative in Guoyu is also wrong, having followed this interpretation. The Xinian (繫年) and Bamboo Annals corroborate the interpretations used here.) After King Li died in exile in c. 828 BC, power was passed to King Xuan.

=== Restoration of King Xuan ===
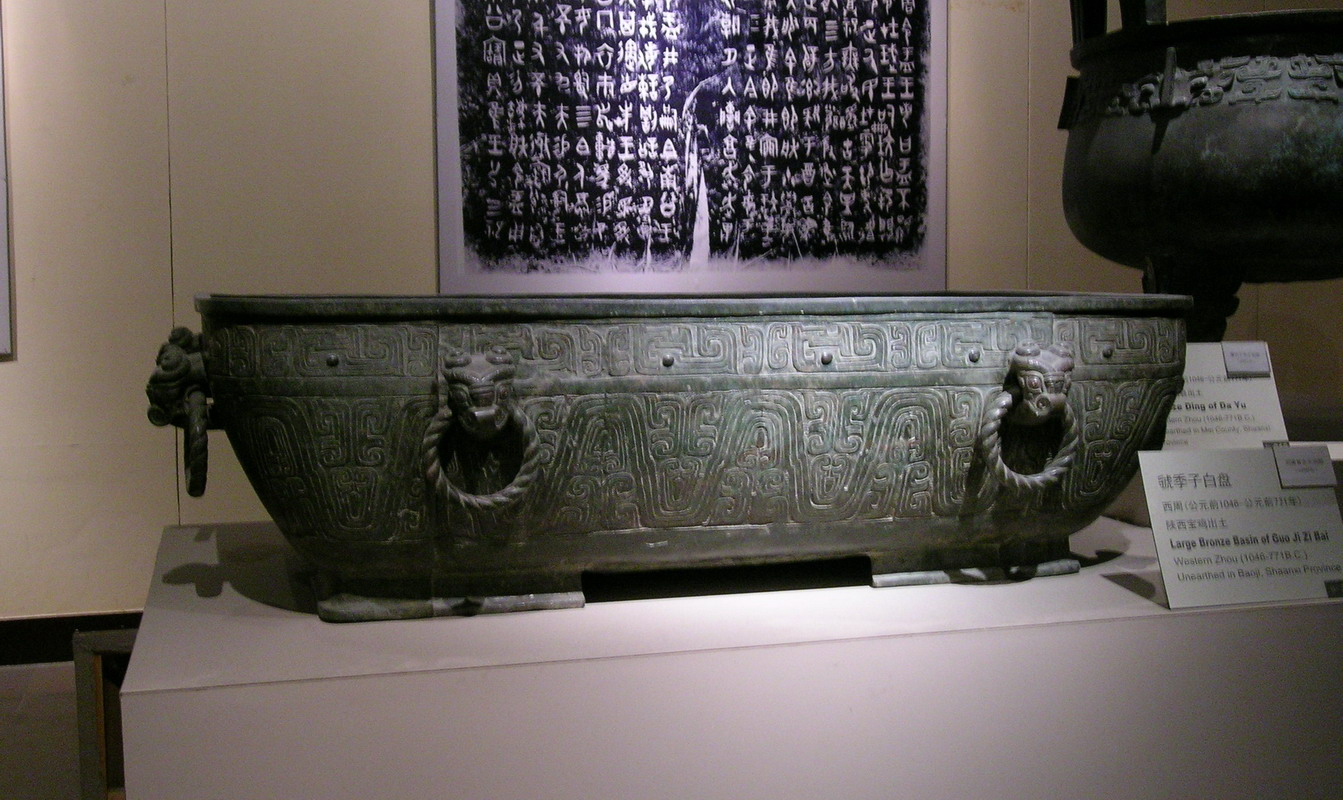
The Guoji Zibai pan, which details a northern campaign possibly from the Restoration of King Xuan.

After King Li of Zhou's death, King Xuan sought to rejuvenate the authority of the Zhou royal family. He received assistance from Duke Mu of Shao, Duke Ding of Zhou, and He, Earl of Gong. After soliciting advice from the ministry, he launched several campaigns against surrounding tribes, resettled the people, and promoted hunting and music once more. He was particularly inspired by the legacies of King Wen, King Wu, King Cheng, and King Kang.

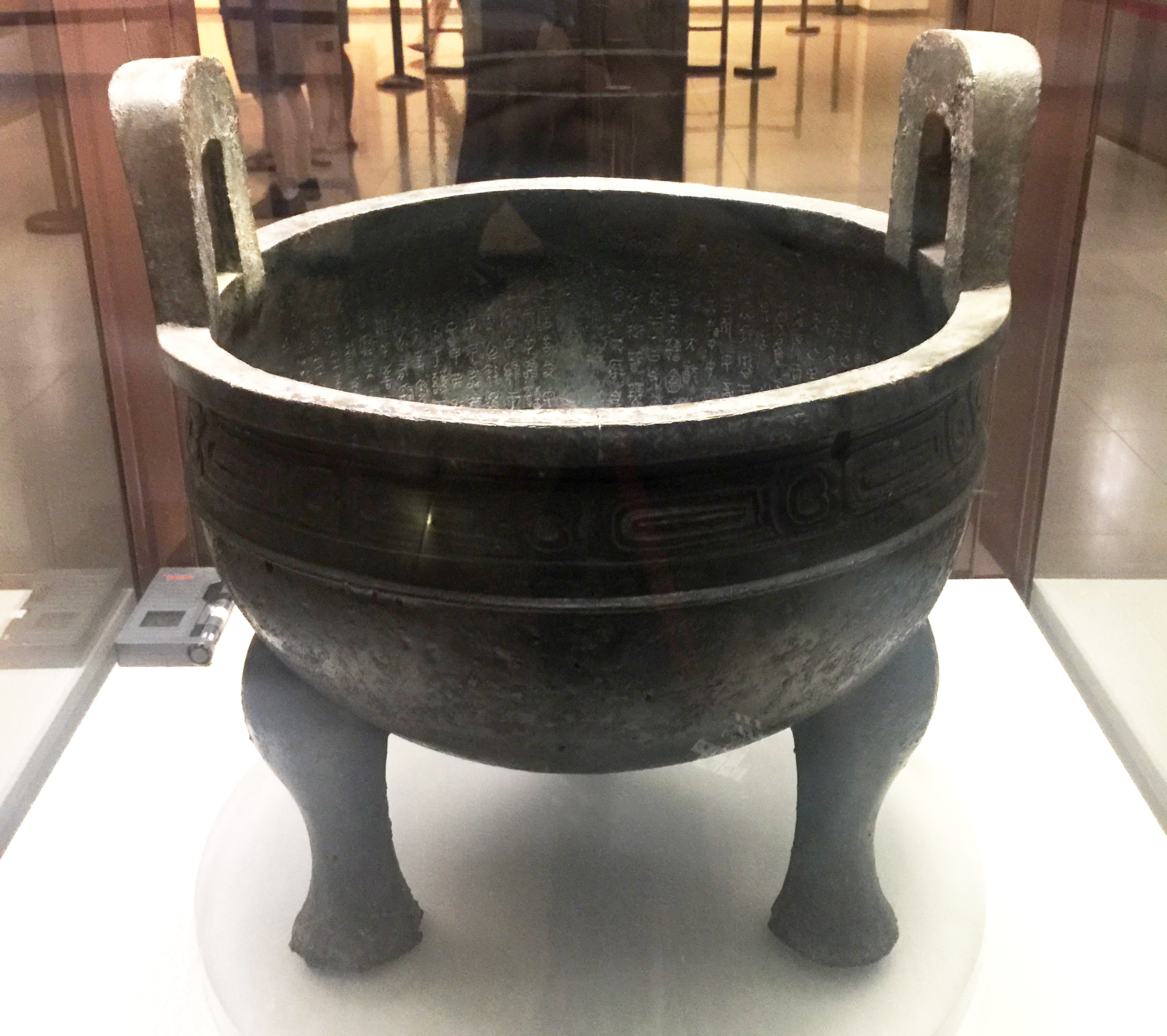
The Mao Gong ding.

The Mao Gong ding, which has one of the longest Chinese bronze inscriptions in history, records King Xuan discussing his anxiety about the then-failing Kingdom of Zhou. Recalling the premierships of Kings Wen and Wu, he saw himself inadequate, and, elevating Duke Yin of Mao to Qing Shi Liao (卿事寮) and Tai Shi Liao (大史寮), ordered the following:

1. Help King Xuan stabilise the Mandate of Heaven.
2. Ensure the people are not disturbed by King Xuan's early regency.
3. If King Xuan issues a "stupid" order, do not allow it to leave the palace.
4. Do not oppress the common people.

However, King Xuan was not immune to his own failings. His sleep schedule would worsen due to constant sex with his wife, Queen Jiang, resulting in him neglecting state affairs. Queen Jiang, realising their addiction caused disorder, removed her hairpins and earrings, awaited punishment, and sent a memorial to the King, saying that their collection action caused him to forget his moral acumen. King Xuan responded to the memorial stating that it was his fault, not hers, and reinstated her position. King Xuan would go on to attend court meetings early and retire late, which led to his reputation being restored. His queen's taking of the blame is considered the turning point in King Xuan's development as a ruler.

The Guoji Zibai pan records a campaign against the Xianyun along the Luo River. King Xuan had appointed Guoji Zibai (虢季子白), the caster of the pan, to lead the offensive. During this campaign, 50 captives were taken and 500 killed, and thus Guoji Zibai was rewarded with horses and wealth. Classical sources imply that the Xianyun had previously plundered Haojing and eroded at royal authority. Campaigns against Chu were also made due to them not upholding tribute to the king, which resulted in a victory recounted in the Classic of Poetry.

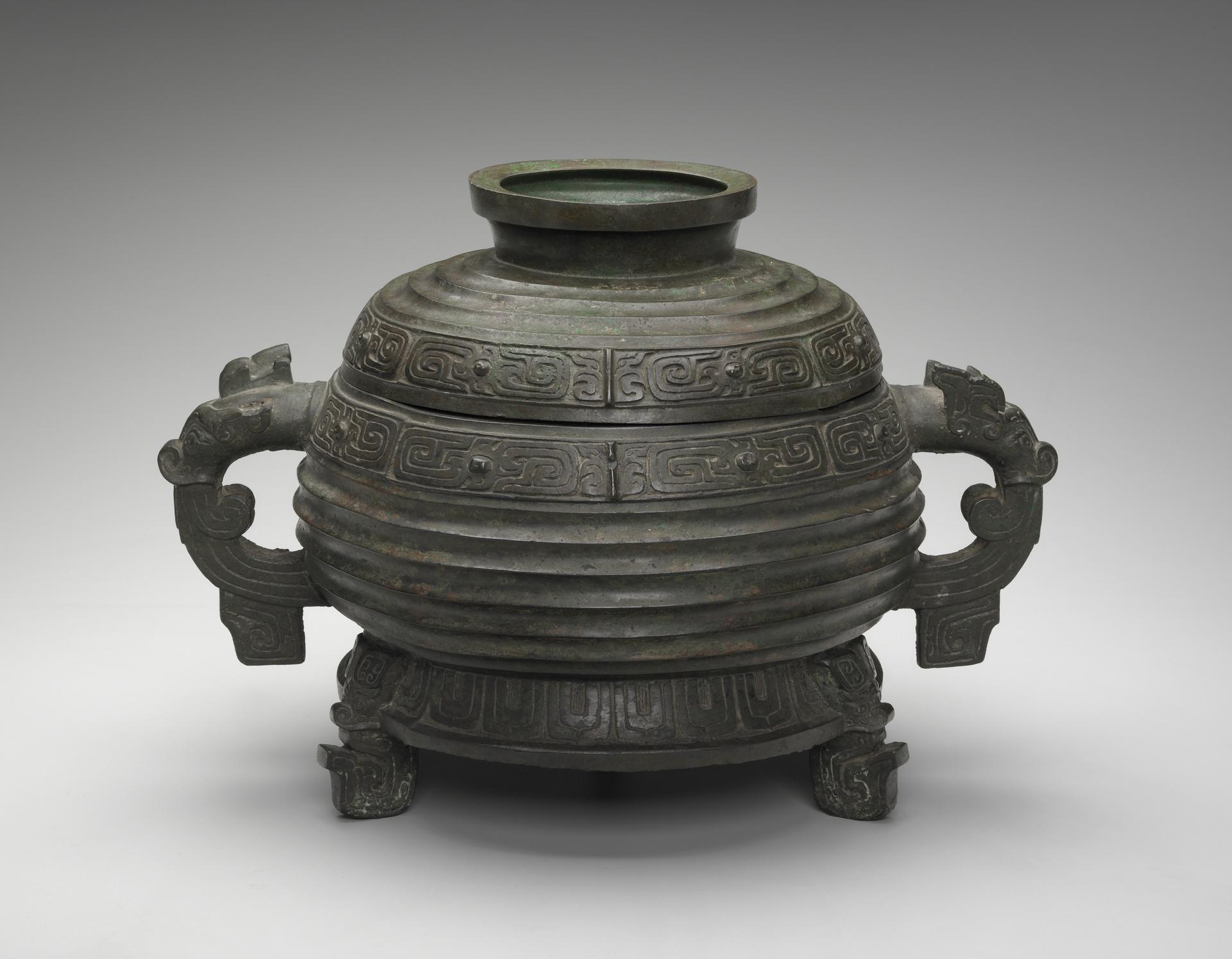
The Song gui.

The Song gui records a meeting in which King Xuan ordered an individual named Song (頌) to take control of 20 storehouses in Chengzhou (成周) and manage the development of new ones. Song was awarded with robes and other garments for his efforts.

=== Decline ===
In the ninth year of King Xuan's reign, he called a meeting of all the lords. In the same year, Duke Wu of Lu paid homage to King Xuan with his sons Kuo (括) and Yi (戲). King Xuan favoured Yi over Kuo, despite him being the younger brother, and desired to make him the crown prince of Lu. Zhong Shanfu advised against this, but was ignored, and Yi was made Duke Yi of Lu. Several years later, Boyu (伯御), the son of Kuo, would kill Duke Yi, leading to a military intervention by King Xuan. Following this, Duke Yi of Lu's younger brother, Cheng (稱), was appointed on the advice of Fan Muzhong (樊穆仲), and made Duke Xiao of Lu. Sima Qian said "from this time on, the many lords mostly rebelled against royal commands," which led to further interventions in Wey and Qi.

Sima Qian documents two further missteps during King Xuan's rule: One was an attempt to count the people in Taiyuan (太原) against advice from Zhong Shanfu, who said it was a violation of li, and another was a military defeat against the Jiang clan (姜氏) during the Battle of Qianmu. Repeated defeats at the hands of the Rong tribe would also occur.

== Death ==
According to Zhang Shoujie's annotation Correct Meanings (史記正義) to Sima's Shiji, King Xuan is said to have ordered a mass execution of women following a rumour that one woman would bring ruin to Zhou. Du Bo remonstrated the king for this act, but was killed by King Xuan in response. Another account claims that Nü Jiu, one of King Xuan's concubines, falsely accused Du Bo of rape. In both accounts, three years later, King Xuan dreamed of Du Bo shooting him with an arrow, and died. This claim would be repeated in Mozi, which serves as the primary source today.

== Family ==
Queens:

- Queen Xian of Zhou, of the Lü lineage of the Jiang clan of Qi (週獻後 姜姓 呂氏), known as Queen Jiang; a daughter of Duke Wu of Qi; married in 826 BC; the mother of Crown Prince Gongsheng

Concubines:

- Lady Hou
- Nü Jiu (女鳩)

Sons:

- Crown Prince Gongsheng (太子宮涅; d. 771 BC), ruled as King You of Zhou (r. 781–771 BC)
- Prince Yuchen (王子餘臣; d. 750 BC), claimed the throne as King Xie of Zhou (r. 770–750 BC)
- Prince Changfu (王子長父), ruled as the Marquis of Yang

== See also ==
- Family tree of Chinese monarchs (ancient)
- Song gui - a ritual bronze attributing his appointment of an official.
- Mao Gong ding - a ritual bronze from the Restoration of King Xuan.
- Guoji Zibai pan - a ritual bronze from the Restoration of King Xuan.

== Notes ==
King Xuan of Zhou Zhou dynasty Died: 782 BC
Regnal titles
Preceded by Gonghe	King of China; 827–782 BC	Succeeded by King You of Zhou
