= Song gui =

Western Zhou Bronze Vessel at the Yale University Art Gallery

- 頌簋
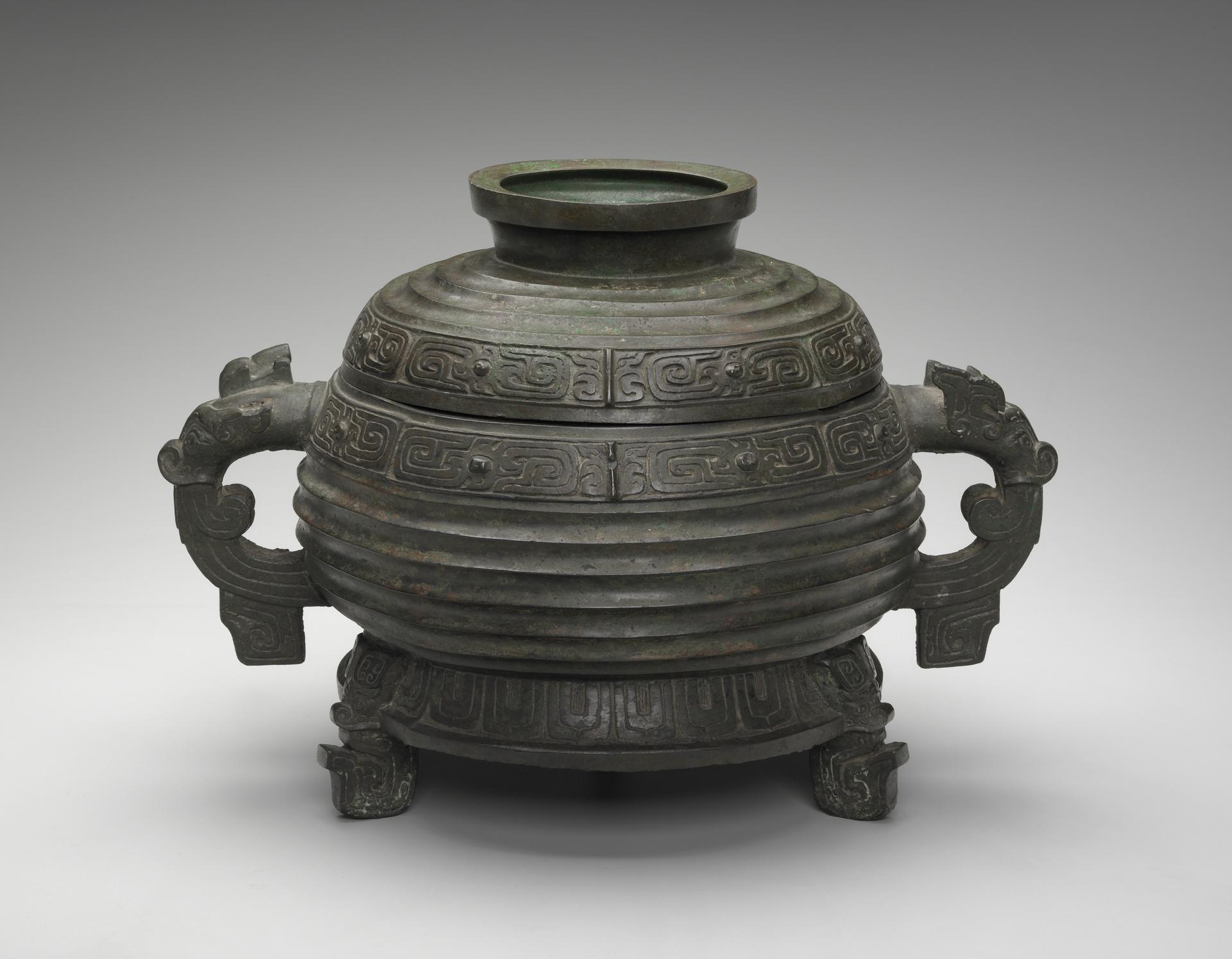

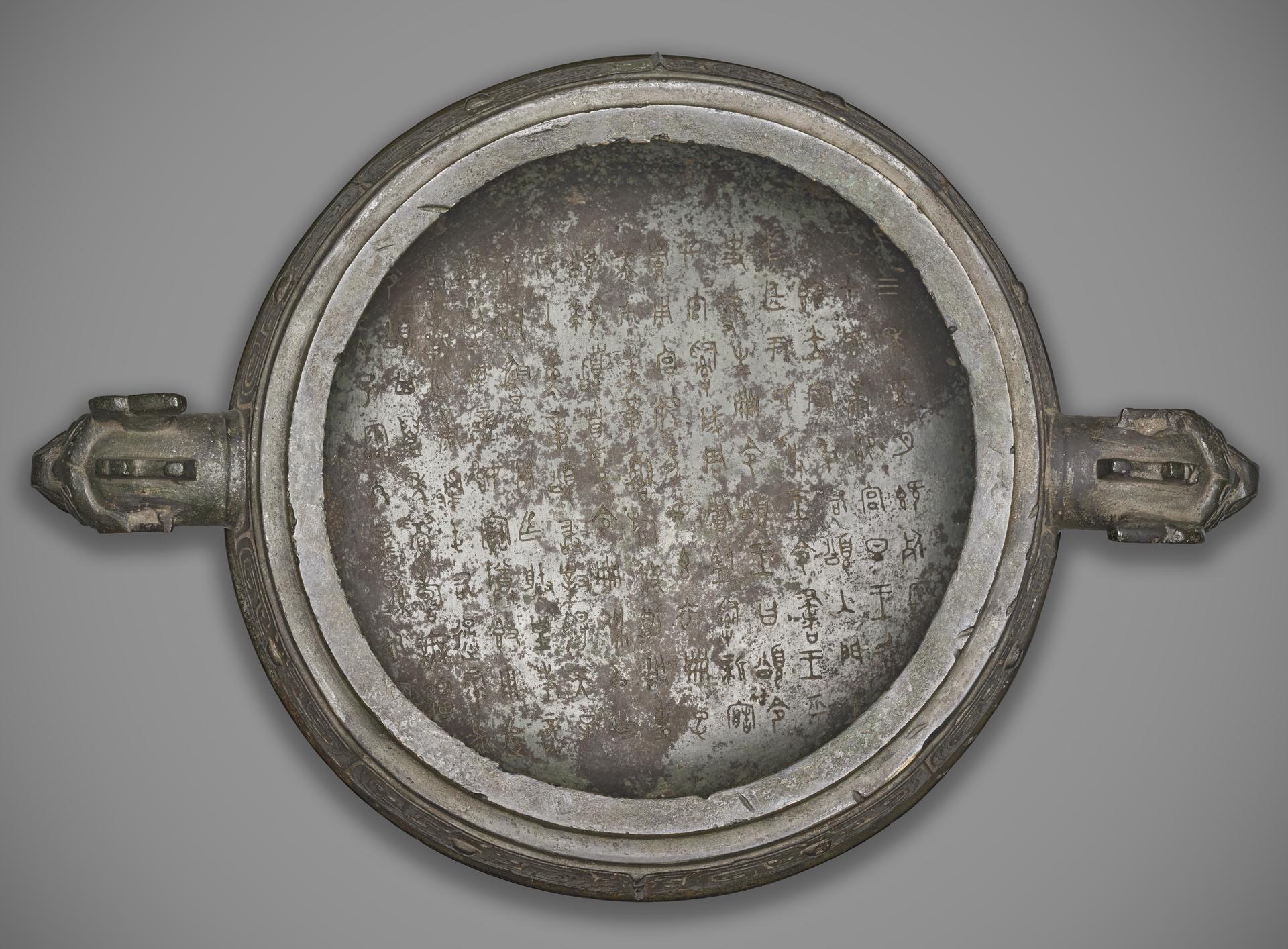
- Inner inscription
- Material: Bronze
- Length: 43.82 cm
- Height: 29.53 cm
- Width: 31.43 cm
- Writing: Chinese bronze inscriptions
- Created: c. 825–779 BC
- Period/culture: Western Zhou dynasty
- Discovered: prior to the 19th century
- Place: Yale University Art Gallery, New Haven, Connecticut
- Classification: Chinese ritual bronze
- Registration: 1952.51.11a-b
- https://artgallery.yale.edu/collections/objects/49627

The Song gui (Chinese: 頌簋; pinyin: Sòng guǐ) is a Chinese ritual bronze Gui from the Western Zhou dynasty (1046–771 BC). Acquired in 1952 by the Yale University Art Gallery, it was the gift of art dealer and Yale University alumnus Wilson P. Foss Jr.

The gui served as a sacrificial vessel for Chinese ancestral worship, holding cooked grain like millet. On the interior, a 152 character inscription describes a royal court appointment by King Xuan of Zhou to the namesake official of the bronze, Song (頌).

Part of the set of a series of bronzes, the Song gui is provides insight into Western Zhou administration beyond the scope and historiography of bamboo slip texts.

== Provenance ==
The provenance of the gui remains unknown, but is linked to multiple other bronzes by the same individual traced at earliest before the 19th century, though many Western Zhou bronzes have been traced to the Wei River in Shaanxi Province.

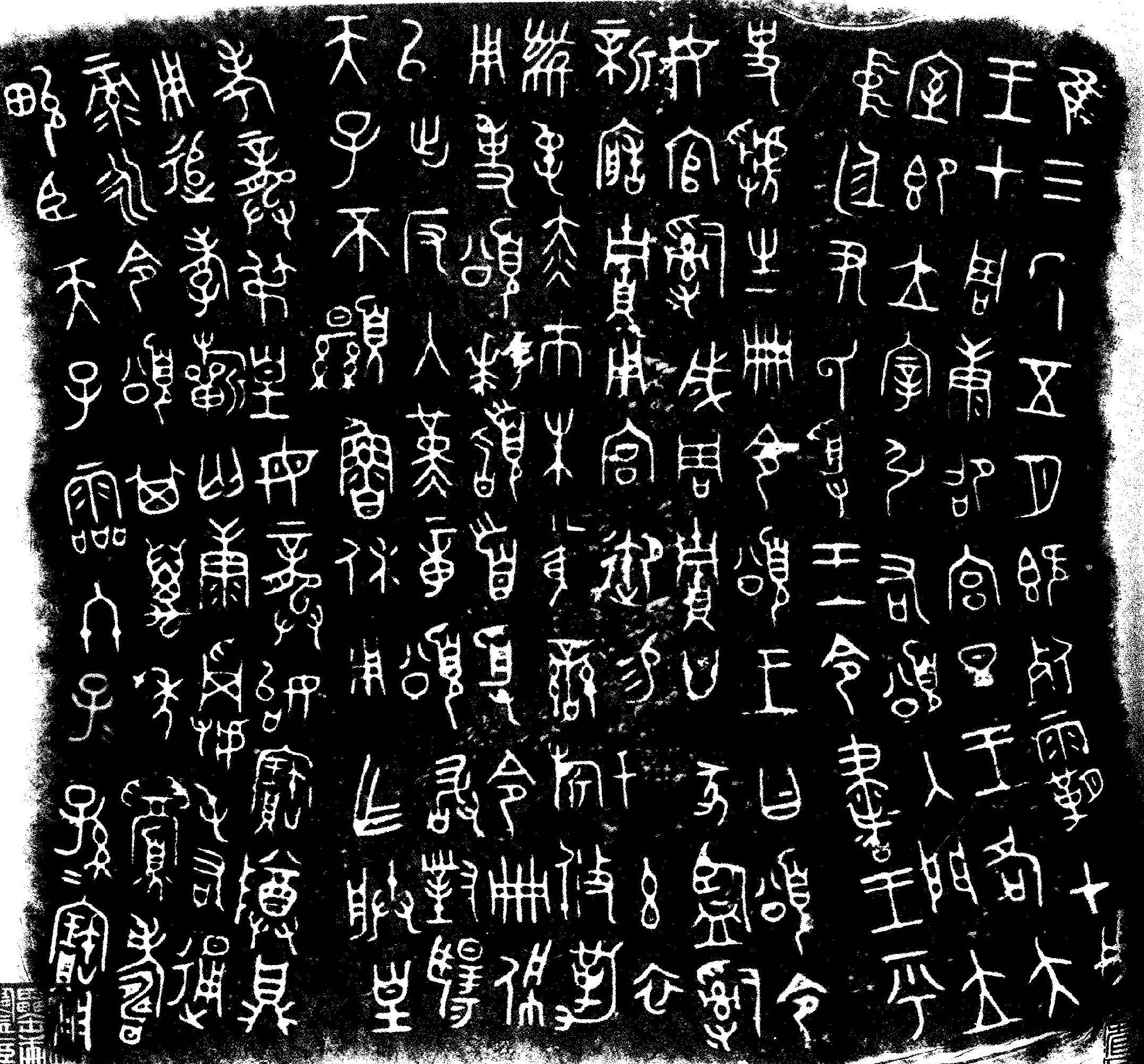
A bronze Ding inscription also dedicated to Song, dedicated to the same appointment (collection: Palace Museum)

Other vessels exist that are attributed to the same individual:

- One cauldron and one jar is held by the National Palace Museum
- One cauldron and one lidless gui at the Palace Museum
- One cauldron and one gui is held by Shanghai Museum
- Another gui is held by the Shandong Museum
- One lid by the Kurokawa Institute of Ancient Cultures
- One lidless jar held by the National Museum of China
- One lidded gui is held by the Nelson-Atkins Museum of Art

== The Text ==
The vessel has a 152-character description commemorating an appointment from the reigning Zhou king to Song. It is copied twice, on the underside of the vessel and the inside the cover.

唯三年五月既死霸甲戌，王在周康昭宮，旦，王𢓜大室，即位。宰引右頌入門， 立中廷，尹氏授王令書，王呼史虢生冊令頌。 “王曰：‘頌！令汝官司成周賈，監司新造賈，用宮御。錫汝玄衣黹純、赤巿、朱 衡、鑾旂、𨦷勒，用事！’ ” 頌拜稽首，受令冊，佩以出，返入覲璋。 頌敢對揚天子丕顯魯休， 用作朕皇考恭叔、皇母恭姒寶尊簋，用追孝、祈匄康𬋴、純祐、通祿、永令。頌其萬年眉壽無疆、駿臣天子霝終、子 子孫孫永寶用。

It was the third year, fifth month, [the period] after the dying brightness (of the moon), [day] jiaxu (11/60). The King was in Zhou, in the palace [dedicated to Kings] Kang and Zhao. At dawn, the King arrived at the Grand Hall and assumed [his] position. Superintendent Yĭn accompanied Song, entering the gate and standing in the centre of the courtyard. Sir Yin passed the command document (ling shu) to the King. The King called out to the Secretary Guosheng to command Song by means of the manuscript roll (ce ling): ‘The King says: “Song! [I] command you to take office in charge of merchants in Chengzhou, and to supervise as an overseer the newly arrived merchants, in order to supply the palace. [I] award you a black jacket with embroidered hem, a red apron, a scarlet girdle, a banner with jingles, [and] a bronze-studded bridle. Use them in [your] service!”’ [I,] Song, did obeisance, bowed and prostrated myself, received the roll with the command (shou ling ce), hung it [on my belt] and came out [of the courtyard]. [I then] returned to present a jade tablet. [I,] Song, take the liberty to extol in response the Son of Heaven’s illustrious [and] blessed beneficence, [and] take this occasion to make [for] my august deceased father Middleborn Gong (‘the Respectful’) and august mother Gong (‘the Respectful’) Si [this] treasured sacrificial gui tureen. [I, Song shall] use it to pursue filial service, to pray for abundant …, pure [divine] protection, pervading wealth, and eternal mandate. For ten thousand years of abundant longevity without limits, relentlessly serving the Son of Heaven until the sprightly end, [I,] Song shall for generations of descendants eternally use [this vessel] as a treasure.

The description describes a court order read on command (冊令; ce ling) by the King of Zhou with Song, accompanied by Superintendent Yin, to which the King puts Song in charge of the merchants in Chengzhou (present day Luoyang) in order to keep the palace supplied. Song is then awarded a uniform consisting of a black jacket with embroidered hem, a red apron, a girdle, a banner with jingles, and a bronze-studded bridle.

Song commemorates this appointment with the gui, in honor of his parents.
