= Kang Hou gui =

Ancient Chinese bronze vessel

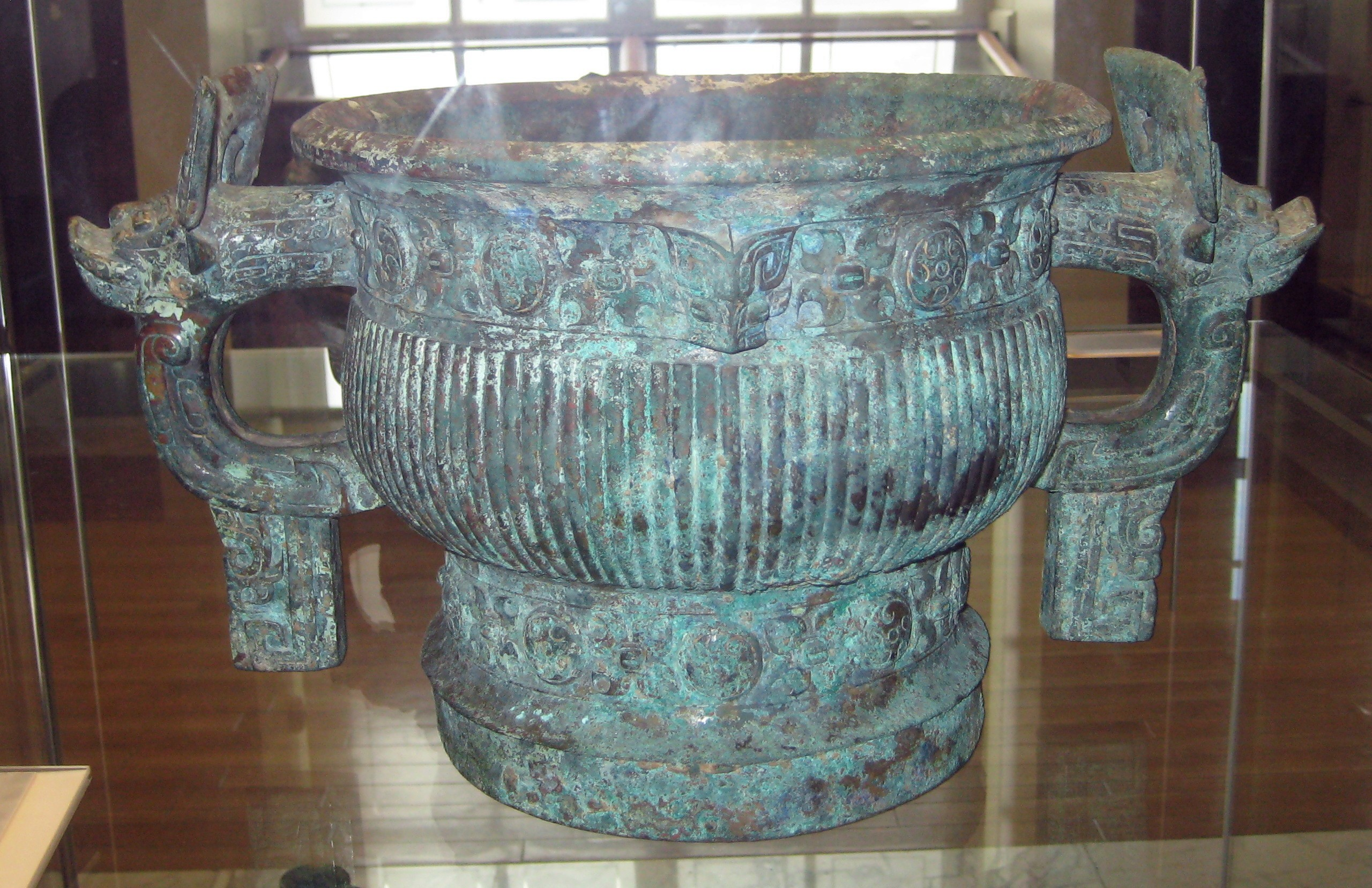
- The Kang Hou Gui vessel on display at the British Museum
- Material: Bronze
- Size: 21.6 cm High, 42 cm Diameter
- Created: 11th Century BC
- Present location: British Museum, London
- Registration: Asia OA 1977,0404.1

The Kang Hou gui (Chinese: 康侯簋) is a bronze vessel that is said to have been taken from the city of Huixian, Henan province, central China. Dating to the Western Zhou period, this ancient Chinese artefact is famous for its inscription on the bottom of the interior. It has been part of the British Museum's Asian Collections since 1977.

== Provenance ==
Little is known about the original context in which the bowl was found. However, based on its inscription, it is conjectured by archaeologists to have been deposited in Wey, near present-day Huixian in Henan province. Past owners of the vessel include the British diplomat Dugald Malcolm, before the gui was purchased by the British Museum with the support of the Brooke Sewell bequest.

== Description ==
This cast bronze gui is a lavishly decorated food bowl that was used during rituals for worshipping ancestors. This high based vessel has large handles shaped like tusked animal heads that have eaten birds, whose beaks are shown peeking out of their predators' mouths. Between the rim and the incised vertical lines is a narrow band decorated with an animal head and alternating roundels and quatrefoils. A similar band (without the animal heads) is engraved on the foot of the container. The Kang Hou gui was chosen by Neil MacGregor, the Director of the British Museum, as object 23 in the BBC Radio programme A History of the World in 100 Objects.

== Inscription ==
The ancient Chinese inscription on the inside of the bowl tells how King Wu's brother, Kang Hou (Marquis of Kang) was given territory to form the state of Wey after the Zhou had subdued a rebellion by remnants of the Shang dynasty. This unsuccessful rebellion, known to historians as the Rebellion of the Three Guards, occurred in the early years of the Western Zhou, dating the manufacture of this important object to the 11th century BC.

== Gallery ==
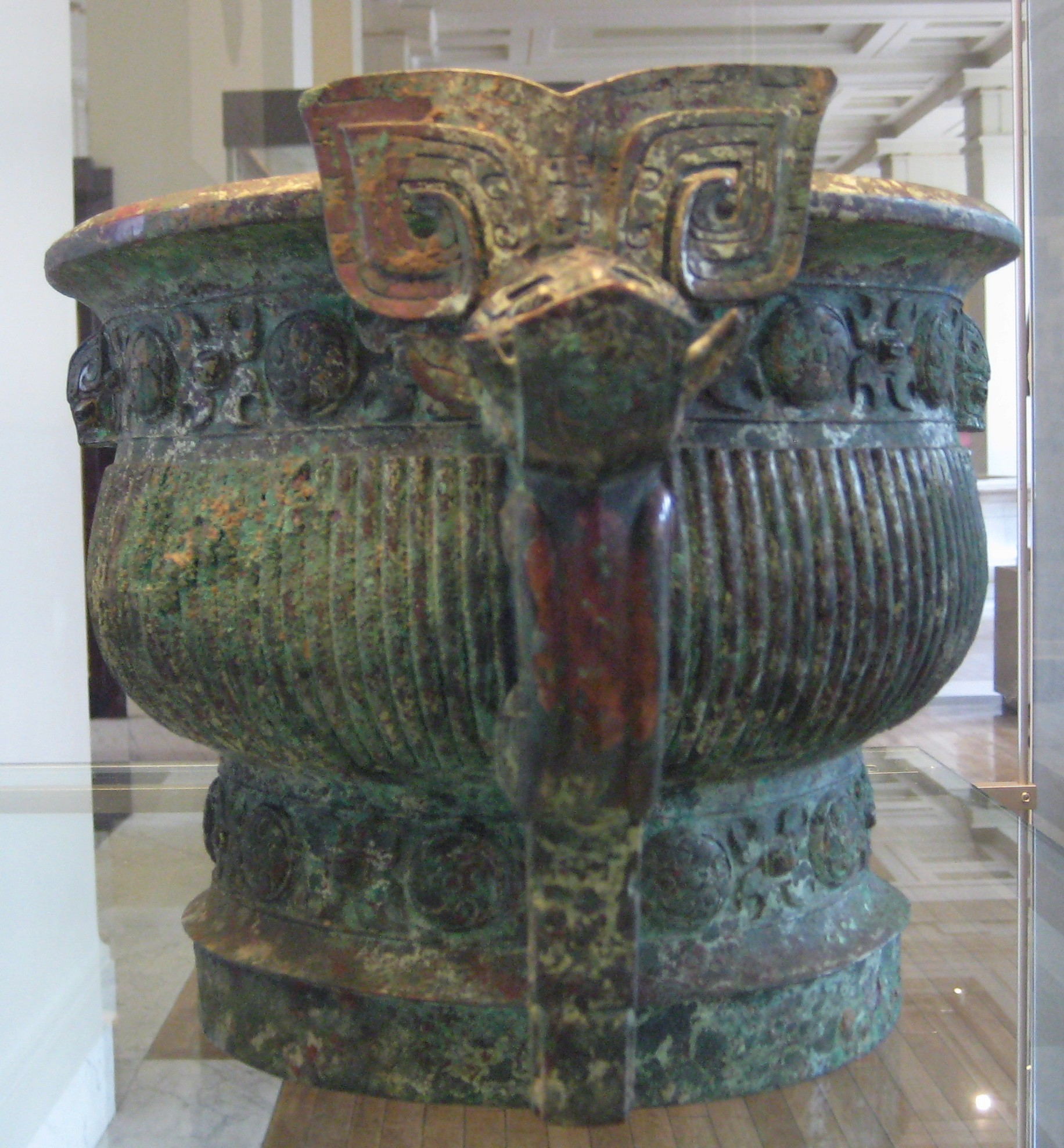
Side view of the Gui vessel in the British Museum

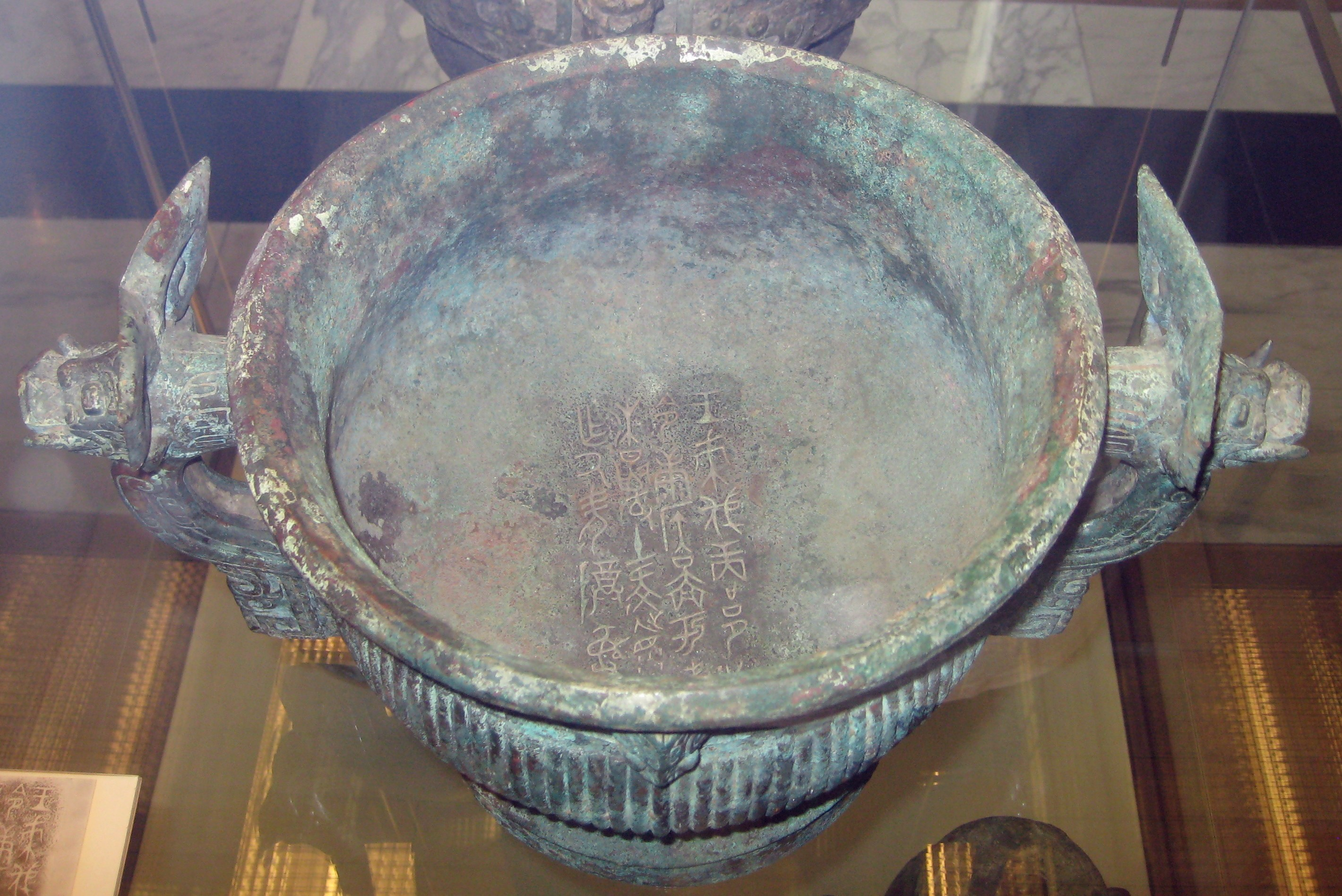
The vessel viewed from above with inscription in the centre

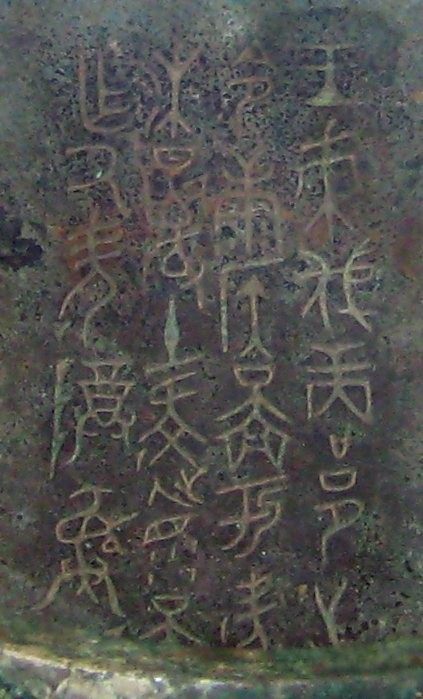
Detail of the Chinese inscription

== See also ==
- Huixian Bronze Hu, also in the British Museum

Preceded by 22: Sphinx of Taharqa	A History of the World in 100 Objects; Object 23	Succeeded by 24: Paracas Textile
