= Paracas textile =

Ancient textiles found in Peru

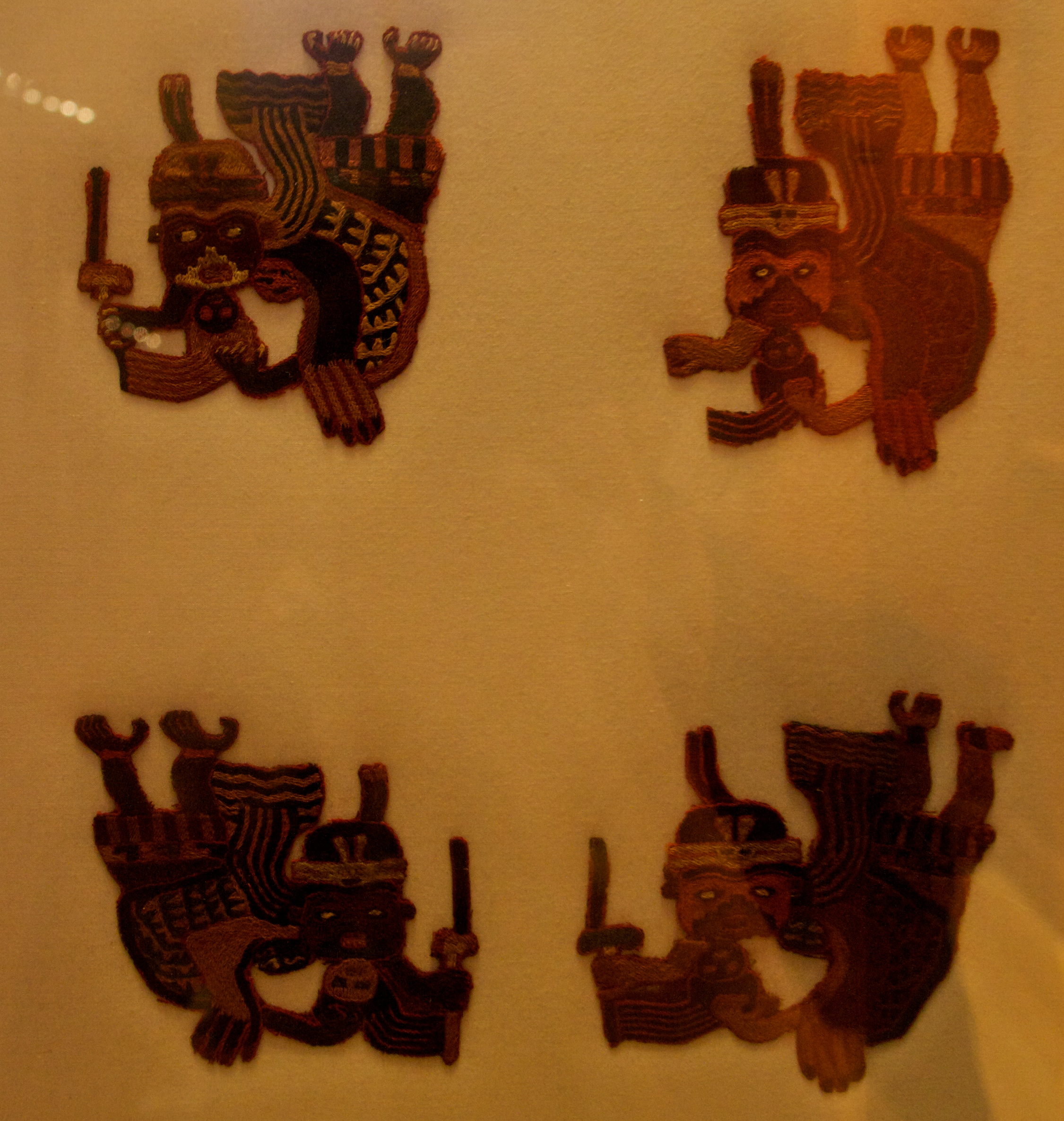
- Material: Wool and cotton
- Created: 300–200 BCE
- Discovered: Peru
- Present location: British Museum, London

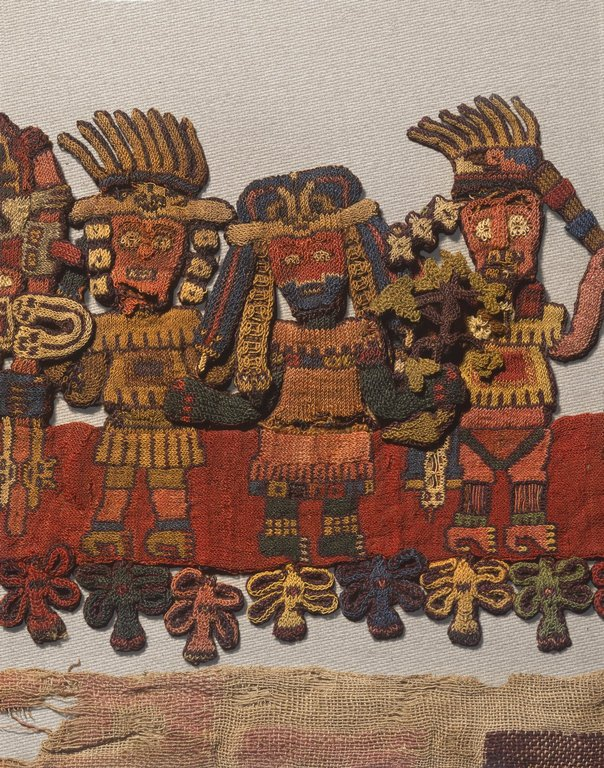
Nasca. Mantle (Detail of "The Paracas Textile"), Brooklyn Museum

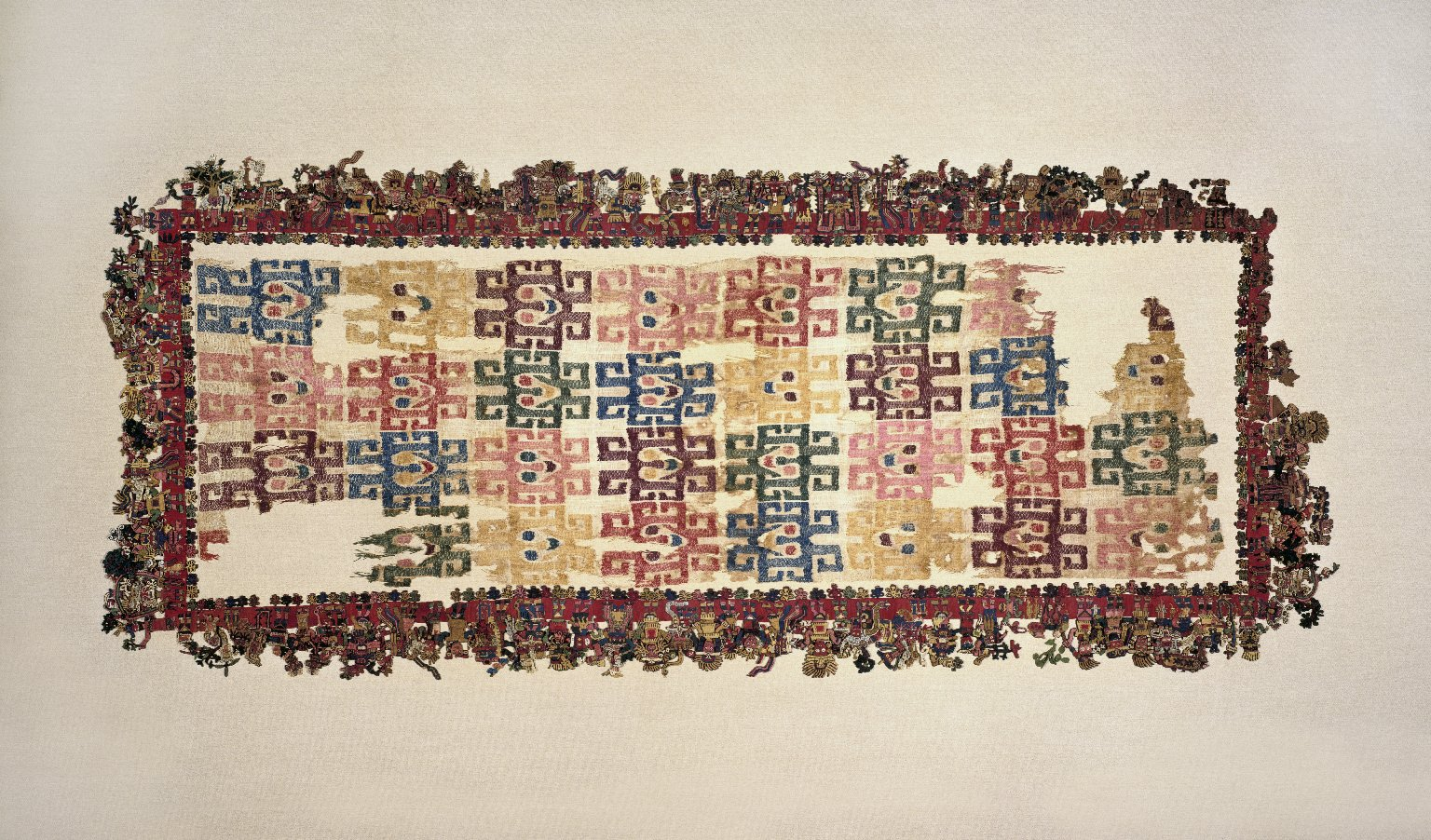
Nasca. Mantle ("The Paracas Textile"), 100-300 C.E. Cotton, camelid fiber, textile: Brooklyn Museum

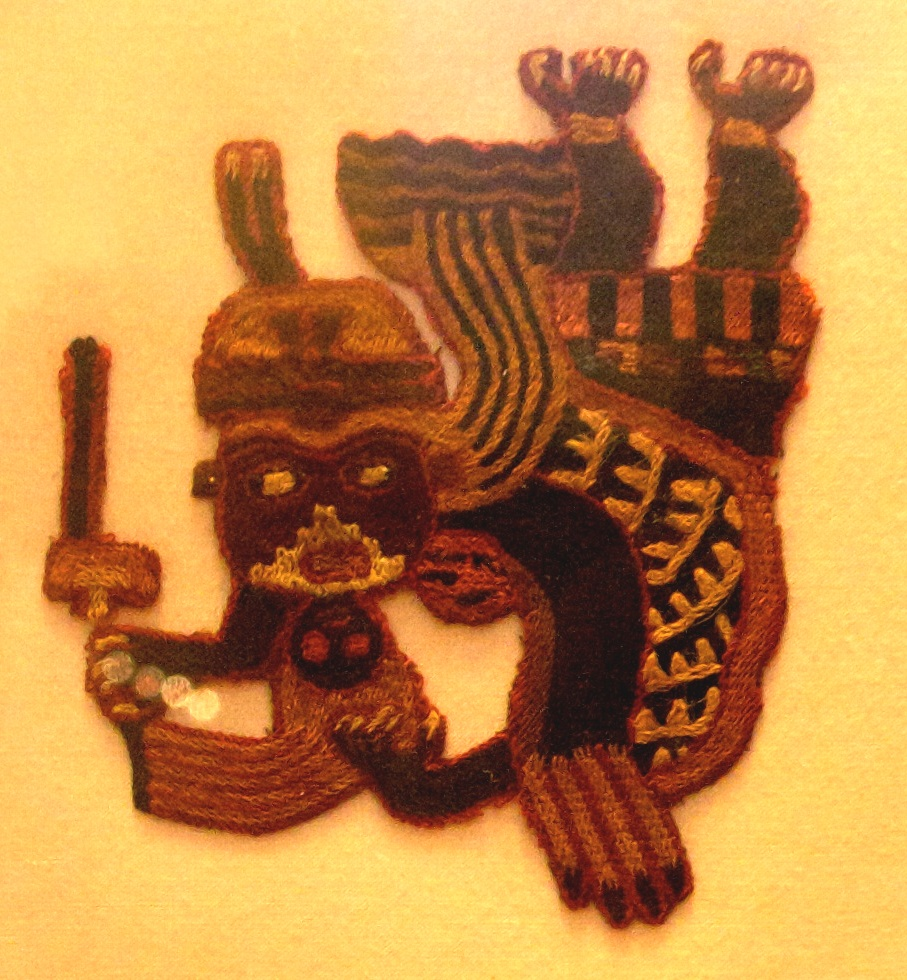
Detail of one shaman showing knife and trophy head

The Paracas textiles were found at a necropolis in Peru in the 1920s. The necropolis held 420 bodies who had been mummified and wrapped in embroidered textiles of the Paracas culture in 200–300 BCE. The examples in the British Museum show flying shamans who hold severed heads by their hair.

== Description ==
These textiles were made by South American people over a thousand years before the rise of the Inca. They are brightly coloured and show evidence of both design and style. The subject of these images are supernatural creatures or shamans who use their hands to hold severed human heads whilst their wings transport them like birds. These could be intended to represent being carried to the next world by spirits or that these figures represent the spirits themselves.

The people who created these textiles had a complex society. There is evidence of pottery, fishing, and farming. There were craftspeople who could make knives from obsidian, jewelry from gold as well as understanding all the complexities of weaving.

== Construction ==
The textiles were made from camelid wool and cotton. The wool is thought to have come from Alpaca or Llama. They had been dyed with natural dyes which unusually had kept their colour after over 2,000 years. The preservation of the colours is attributed to the dry conditions combined with the lack of damage which would usually have been caused by sunlight.

The smaller fragments illustrated here have been taken from the large pieces of cloth that were used to wrap the bodies of the dead. These cloths were as long as 100 feet (34 metres) and would have required a significant organisation of a number of people to construct. The bodies were found in groups of 40 or 50 as if they were family vaults which had been used by several generations.

== Provenance ==
The necropolis on the Paracas Peninsula was discovered by Julio C. Tello in the 1920s. Tello first visited the site on July 26, 1925 following a trail that had begun in 1915 when he had purchased ancient textiles in Pisco, Peru. On 25 October 1927, Tello and his team uncovered the first of hundreds of ceremonial mummified bundle burials. Tello discovered a necropolis that contained corpses that were sat in baskets. Around each of the bodies were large textiles that included large woven cotton that was decorated with woollen embroidery.

A purpose-built museum was built near Paracas at the request of President Benevides who in August 1938 authorised Tello to build a museum to house the 380 textiles that Tello and his staff had preserved. They were able to put on display over 180 textiles. The preservation of these had been funded by the Rockefeller Foundation.

The embroidery illustrated here are fragments from a larger piece of fabric that were removed before they were purchased by the British Museum. Today these are only shown under limited light conditions where they are held tight between a backing material and perspex. In 1928 they began to remove these for safe keeping.

== History of the World ==
These textile pictures from the British Museum were chosen to be one of the A History of the World in 100 Objects which was a series of radio programmes that started in 2010 and that were created in a partnership between the BBC and the British Museum.

Preceded by 23: Kang Hou Gui	A History of the World in 100 Objects; Object 24	Succeeded by 25: Gold coin of Croesus
