= Chencang District =

Coordinates: 34.3061°N 107.387°E

Chencang 陈仓区
- District
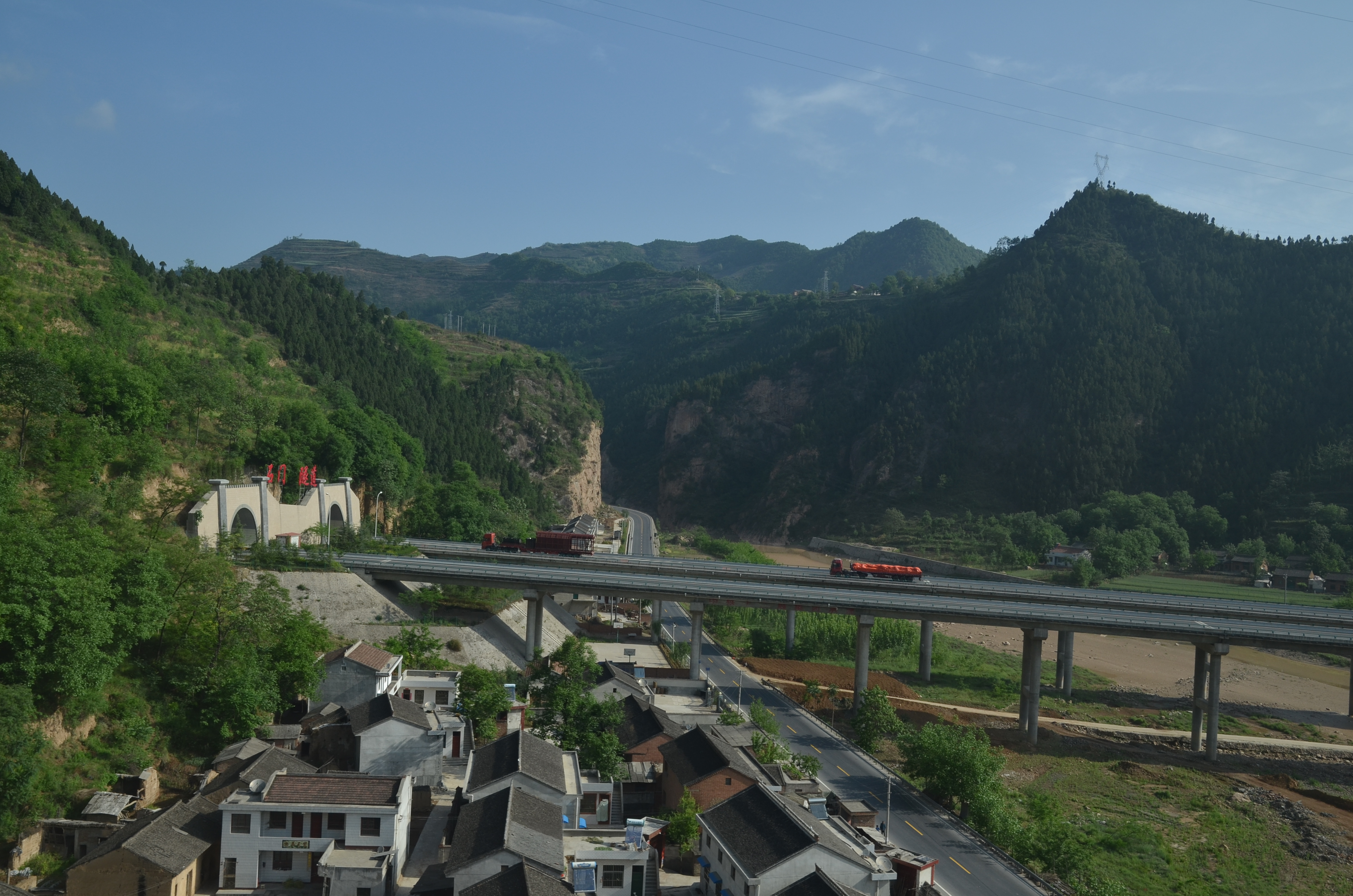

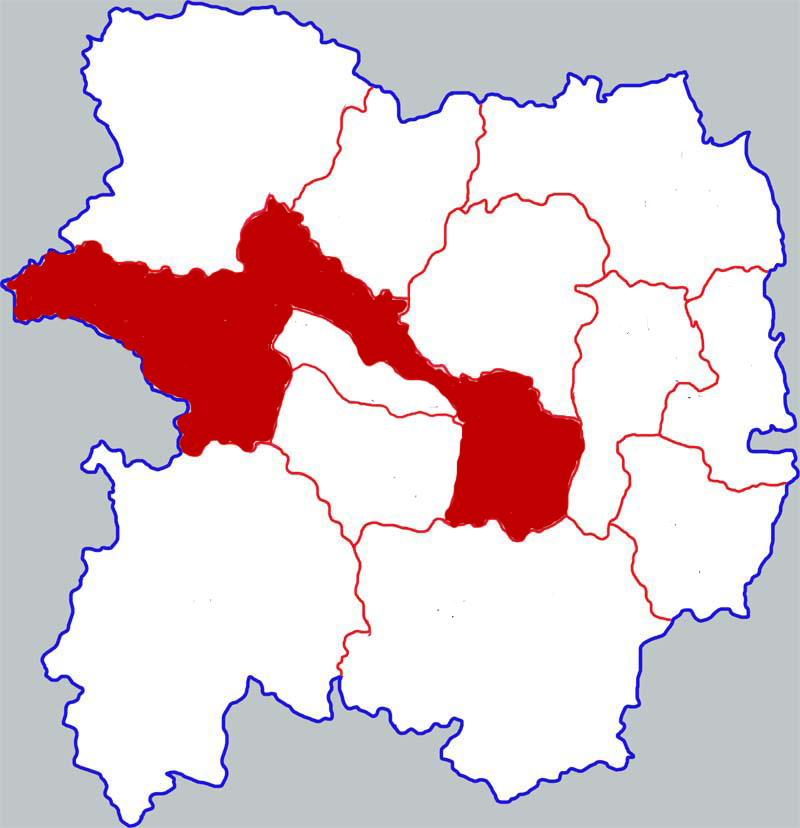
- Chencang in Baoji

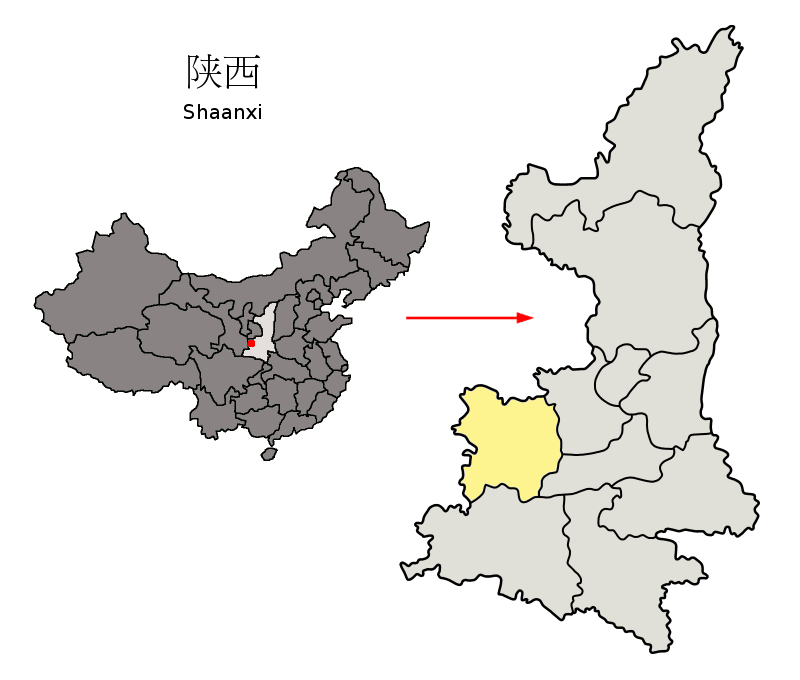
- Baoji in Shaanxi
- Country: People's Republic of China
- Province: Shaanxi
- Prefecture-level city: Baoji

Area
  - Total: 2,057 km^{2} (794 sq mi)

Population (2019)
  - Total: 602,500
  - Density: 292.9/km^{2} (758.6/sq mi)
- Time zone: UTC+8 (China standard time)
- Postal code: 721300

Chencang District simplified Chinese: 陈仓区; traditional Chinese: 陳倉區; pinyin: Chéncāng Qū, is a district of the city of Baoji in central Shaanxi province, China.

Chencang is the former name of Baoji, which was given to the district. The district makes up the outer areas of Baoji, most of the area being rural. In 2020, the Baoji High-tech Zone was established in the district.

After the founding of the People's Republic of China, it came under the jurisdiction of the Baoji region and was called Baoji County. In October 1971, Baoji District was abolished and Baoji prefecture-level city was established, to which Baoji County belonged. In March 2003, the State Council approved the abolition of Baoji County and the establishment of Chencang District in Baoji City.

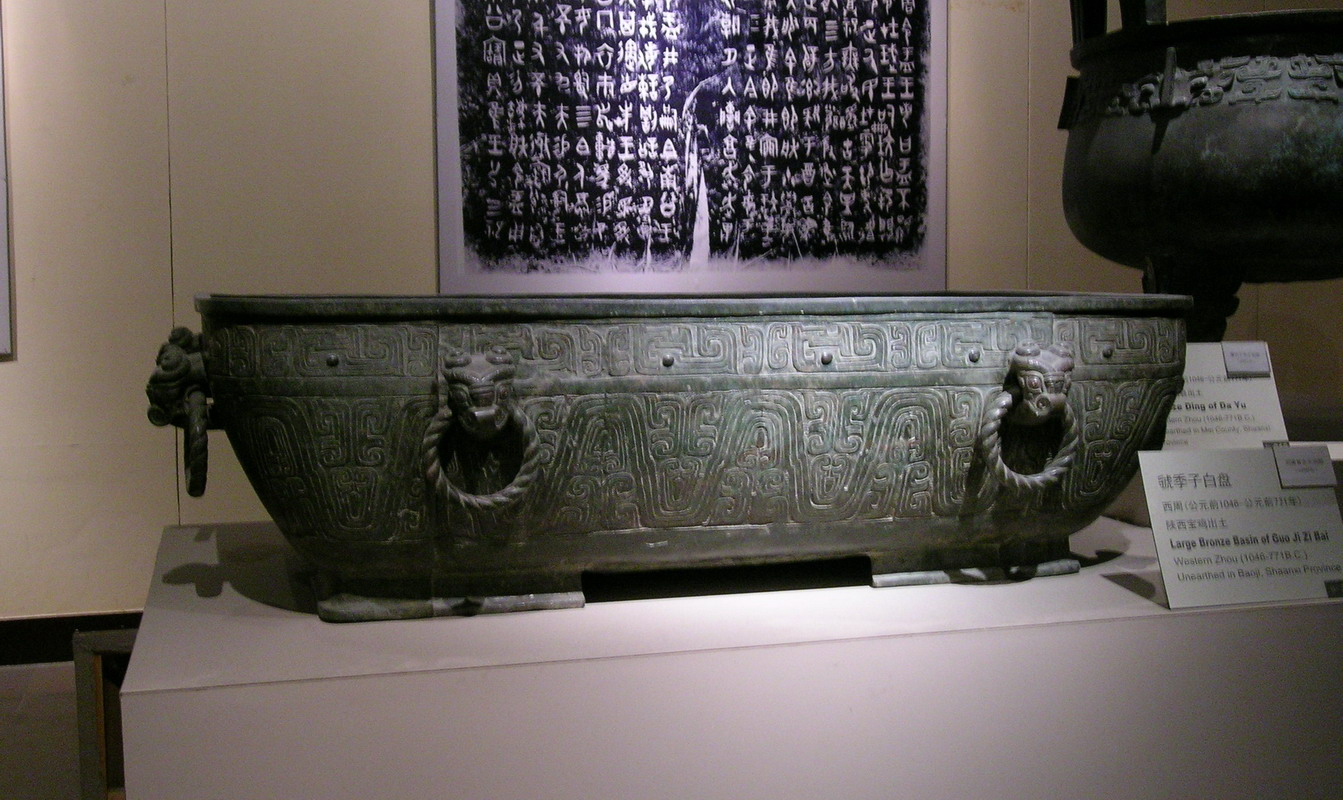
Guojizibai pan, excavated in Chencang

The county seat of Guozhen has carried the same name for 3,000 years. Many archeological sites are located in Chencang. The Guoji Zibai pan was excavated in the county, it is now displayed in the National Museum of China. Chencang also has its own museum to display local archeological finds.

== Administrative divisions ==
As of 2020, this County is divided to 3 subdistricts and 15 towns.

Subdistricts

- Guozhen Subdistrict (虢镇街道)
- Dongguan Subdistrict (东关街道)
- Qianwei Subdistrict (千渭街道)

Towns

- Yangping (阳平镇)
- Qianhe (千河镇)
- Panxi (磻溪镇)
- Tianwang (天王镇)
- Muyi (慕仪镇)
- Zhouyuan (周原镇)
- Jiacun (贾村镇)
- Xiangong (县功镇)
- Xinjie (新街镇)
- Pingtou (坪头镇)
- Xiangquan (香泉镇)
- Chisha (赤沙镇)
- Tuoshi (拓石镇)
- Fenggeling (凤阁岭镇)
- Diaowei (钓渭镇)

== Climate ==
Climate data for Chencang District, elevation 563 m (1,847 ft), (1991–2020 normals, extremes 1991–present)
Month	Jan	Feb	Mar	Apr	May	Jun	Jul	Aug	Sep	Oct	Nov	Dec	Year
Record high °C (°F)	19.8 (67.6)	23.4 (74.1)	30.5 (86.9)	36.0 (96.8)	37.5 (99.5)	41.7 (107.1)	41.5 (106.7)	39.5 (103.1)	38.5 (101.3)	31.8 (89.2)	26.4 (79.5)	20.1 (68.2)	41.7 (107.1)
Mean daily maximum °C (°F)	5.6 (42.1)	9.5 (49.1)	15.2 (59.4)	21.5 (70.7)	26.1 (79.0)	30.9 (87.6)	31.8 (89.2)	29.2 (84.6)	24.2 (75.6)	18.9 (66.0)	12.8 (55.0)	7.0 (44.6)	19.4 (66.9)
Daily mean °C (°F)	0.1 (32.2)	3.6 (38.5)	8.9 (48.0)	14.8 (58.6)	19.4 (66.9)	24.3 (75.7)	26.2 (79.2)	24.2 (75.6)	19.3 (66.7)	13.7 (56.7)	7.2 (45.0)	1.4 (34.5)	13.6 (56.5)
Mean daily minimum °C (°F)	−3.7 (25.3)	−0.7 (30.7)	3.9 (39.0)	9.0 (48.2)	13.6 (56.5)	18.7 (65.7)	21.6 (70.9)	20.4 (68.7)	15.7 (60.3)	10.0 (50.0)	3.1 (37.6)	−2.5 (27.5)	9.1 (48.4)
Record low °C (°F)	−13.2 (8.2)	−10.0 (14.0)	−5.8 (21.6)	−1.0 (30.2)	3.3 (37.9)	9.6 (49.3)	15.1 (59.2)	12.4 (54.3)	6.4 (43.5)	−1.0 (30.2)	−8.6 (16.5)	−18.3 (−0.9)	−18.3 (−0.9)
Average precipitation mm (inches)	5.3 (0.21)	9.2 (0.36)	24.0 (0.94)	41.4 (1.63)	63.0 (2.48)	75.9 (2.99)	94.1 (3.70)	123.0 (4.84)	115.9 (4.56)	55.3 (2.18)	17.3 (0.68)	3.6 (0.14)	628 (24.71)
Average precipitation days	3.7	4.0	7.0	7.4	10.3	9.8	10.2	11.4	12.9	10.8	5.6	3.0	96.1
Average snowy days	5.1	3.4	1.5	0.1	0	0	0	0	0	0.1	1.3	3.2	14.7
Average relative humidity (%)	62	62	63	66	67	64	70	78	82	78	72	65	69
Mean monthly sunshine hours	139.7	134.9	168.0	195.2	204.0	203.9	211.2	181.4	132.7	133.1	140.5	146.4	1,991
Percentage possible sunshine	44	43	45	50	47	47	48	44	36	38	46	48	45
Source: China Meteorological Administration
