= Huaiyi =

Huaiyi may refer to:

- a branch of the ancient Dongyi people
- Xue Huaiyi or Huaiyi, Tang dynasty monk
- Li Cou or Crown Prince Huaiyi, Tang dynasty prince

== See also ==
- Guo Huaiyi
