= Gonghe Regency =

Zhou dynasty Chinese regency

Gonghe Regency 共和执政
- 841 BC – 828 BC
| Reign of King Li | Reign of King Zuan |
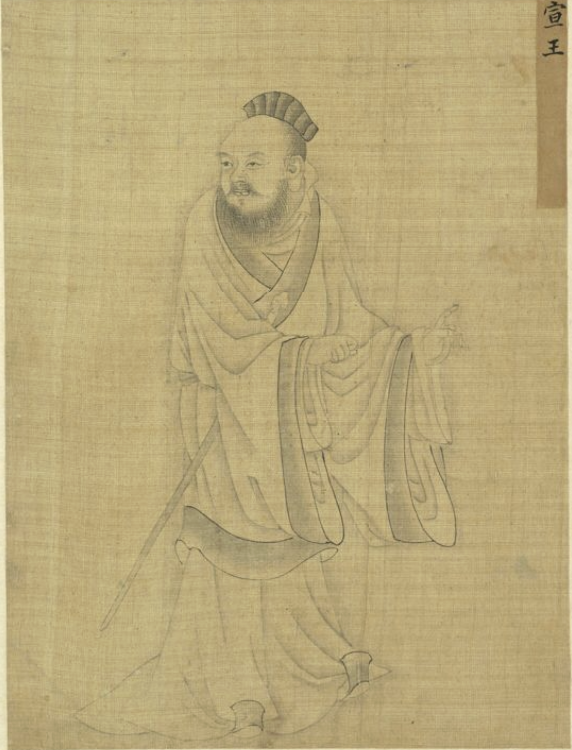
- Ji Jing, the heir to the throne during the regency.
- Key events: Compatriots Rebellion (國人暴动); Exile of King Li

The Gonghe Regency (Chinese: 共和执政; pinyin: Gònghé Zhízhèng) was an interregnum period in Chinese history led by He, Earl of Gong, from 841 BC (Note: The Cambridge History of Ancient China gives the starting date as 842 BC.) to 828 BC, after King Li of Zhou was exiled by his nobles during the Compatriots Rebellion [zh], when the people rioted against their old corrupt king. It lasted until the ascension of King Li's son, King Xuan of Zhou.

== History ==
King Li of Zhou was, according to contemporary sources, a corrupt and decadent ruler. To pay for his pleasures and vices, King Li raised taxes and caused misery among his subjects. It is said that he barred the commoners from profiting from communal forests and lakes, and instated a new law which allowed him to punish anyone, by death, who dared to speak against him. King Li's tyrannical rule soon forced many peasants and soldiers all around Zhou China into revolt in what was called the Compatriots Rebellion (國人暴动). Li was sent into exile at a place called Zhi near modern Linfen (842 BC), his son was taken by one of his ministers and hidden.

To ensure stability during the resulting power vacuum, He, Earl of Gong took power. He was born in the State of Wei (衞國) and was eventually enfeoffed in Gong, forming his own state. Lüshi Chunqiu records the Zhou turning to He of their own accord to begin the regency during the Compatriots Rebellion.

When King Li died in exile in 828 BC, power was passed to his son, the King Xuan of Zhou, ending the regency. He, Earl of Gong, would return to his home state, wherein it would rain heavily.

== Interpretations ==
Han dynasty historian Sima Qian interpreted gonghe as 'joint harmony' in his Records of the Grand Historian, and thus concluded that it was two famous dukes, Duke Ding of Zhou and Duke Mu of Shao, who took power, hence effectively transforming the state into a coregency.

Later discoveries proved this incorrect. According to the Bamboo Annals, an archaeologically unearthed text discovered in antiquity but postdating Sima Qian, the Gonghe Regency was a period in which the Zhou dynasty was ruled by a single person—He, Earl of Gong. This reading has been fully corroborated by an independent archaeologically-unearthed text, known as the Xinian (繫年). Han dynasty sources often interpret the events as a usurpation, but contemporary academia tends to refer to it as a popular uprising, following Lü Buwei's interpretation in Lüshi Chunqiu.

== Legacy ==
The first year of the Gonghe Regency, 841 BC, is highly significant in ancient Chinese history, in that Sima Qian was able to construct a year-by-year chronology back to that point, but he and subsequent historians were unable to confidently date any earlier events in Chinese history. Sima himself found the information about earlier dates in his sources to be unreliable and contradictory and so chose not to adopt them in his work. The government of the People's Republic of China sponsored the Xia–Shang–Zhou Chronology Project, a multidisciplinary project that sought to give better estimates for dates prior to 841 BC, but the project's draft report, published in 2000, has been criticized by various scholars.

When encountering the Western term "republic", the Japanese drew parallels with the Gonghe Regency of Chinese history, and began using the term 共和国 (kyouwakoku, literally "shared harmony country", analogous to "commonwealth") to describe such non-monarchical systems. This semantic shift would later be reborrowed into Chinese as 共和國 (gònghéguó), and then from Chinese to Vietnamese as cộng hòa quốc, shortened to cộng hòa in modern usage.

It is worth noting however, that the term 民國 ("people's state", literally "people's country", read as mínguó, minkoku, min'guk and dân quốc in Chinese, Japanese, Korean and Vietnamese respectively) is used when referring to the formal names of the Republic of China and Korea; but not the People's Republic of China or the Democratic People's Republic of Korea, where the regular word for "republic" is used.

== Notes ==
Gonghe Regency Zhou dynasty
| Preceded by King Li of Zhou | Regent of China; 841–828 BC | Succeeded by King Xuan of Zhou |
