= King Li of Zhou =

King Li of Zhou 周厲王
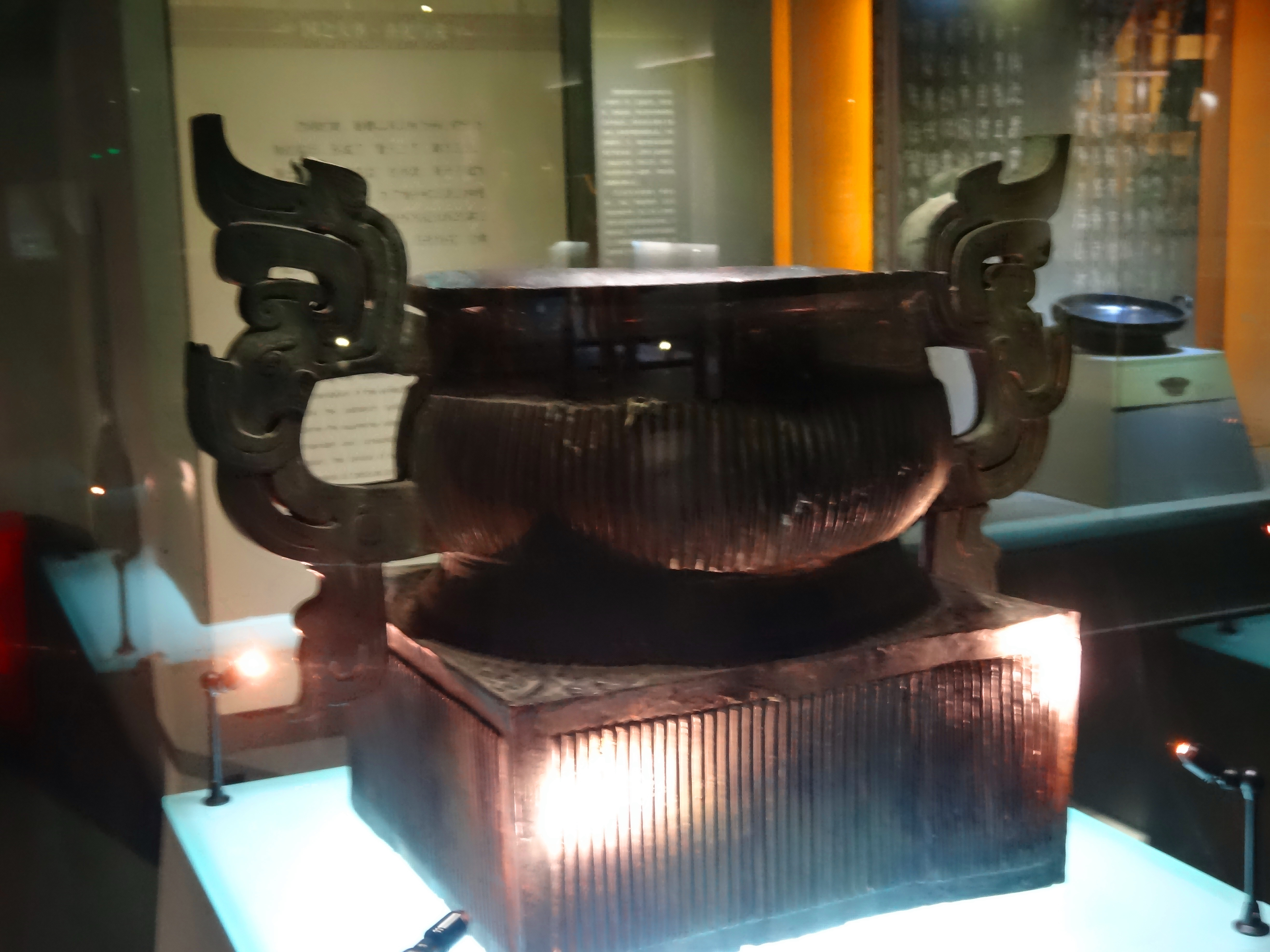
- The Hu Gui, made in the 12th year of King Li's reign.

King of the Zhou dynasty
- Reign: 877–841 BC
- Predecessor: King Yí of Zhou
- Successor: He, Earl of Gong; Gonghe Regency
- Died: 828 BC
- Spouse: Shen Jiang
- Issue: King Xuan of Zhou; Duke Huan of Zheng
Names
- Ancestral name: Ji (姬); Given name: Hu (胡)
Posthumous name
- King Li (厲王) or King La (剌王)
- House: Ji
- Dynasty: Zhou (Western Zhou)
- Father: King Yí of Zhou
- Mother: Wang Ji

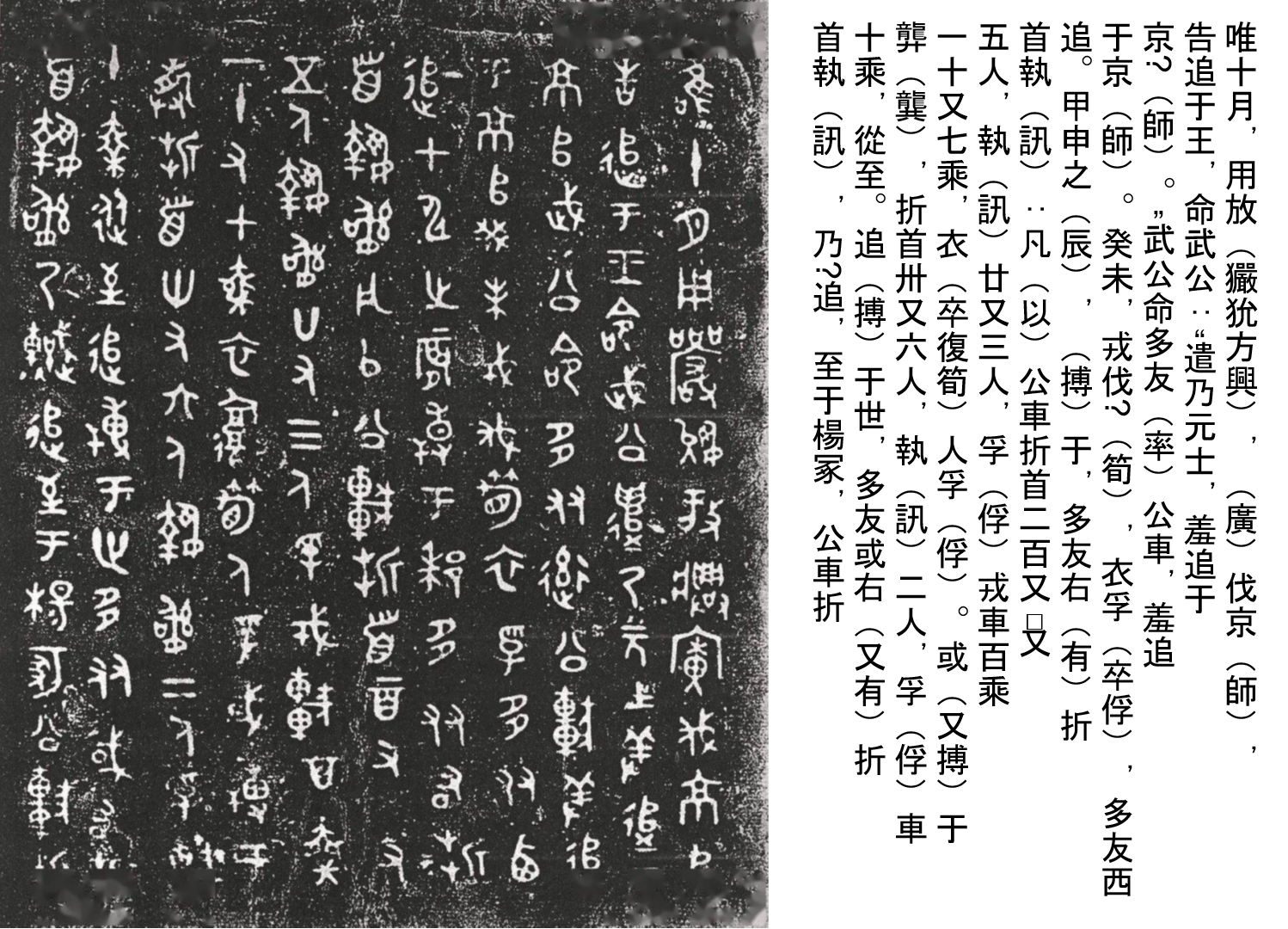
The Duo You ding inscription of the time of King Li, mentioning an attack from the northern tribe of the Xianyun.

King Li of Zhou (died in 828 BC) (Chinese: 周厲王; pinyin: Zhōu Lì Wáng), also known as King Fen of Zhou (周汾王), personal name Ji Hu, was the tenth king of the Zhou dynasty of China. Estimated dates of his reign are 877–841 BC or 857–842 BC (Cambridge History of Ancient China).

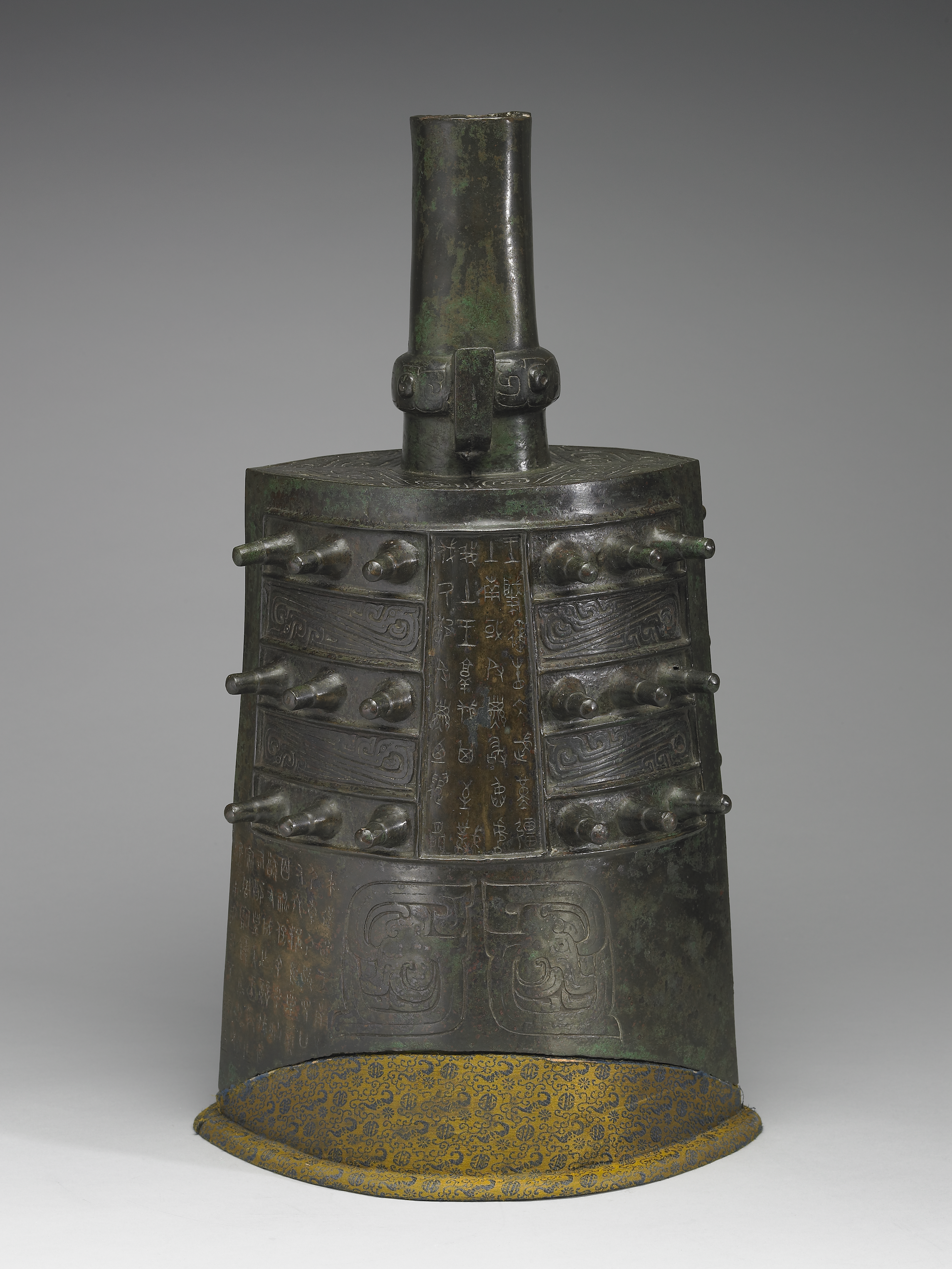
The Zong Zhou Zhong (Bell of Zhou), 9th century BC, National Palace Museum, Taipei

Sima Qian's Records of the Grand Historian depict King Li as a tyrannical and decadent king. To pay for his pleasures and vices, King Li raised taxes and caused misery among his subjects. It is said that he barred the commoners from profiting from the communal forests and lakes. He instated a new law which allowed him to punish anyone who dared to speak against him by death. King Li's bad rule soon forced many peasants and soldiers into revolt, and Li was sent into exile at a place called Zhi near Linfen (842 BC). This led to He, Earl of Gong taking power, seemingly by popular uprising, ruling as regent for his son, Ji Jing. When Li died in exile in 828 BC, power was passed to that same son, who would be enthroned as King Xuan of Zhou.

== Shen Dao fragments ==
The Shen Dao fragments also depict King Li as a decadent and corrupt king. The fragments say:

Formerly, during the decline of the house of Zhou, King Li brought trouble and chaos to all under heaven, the feudal lords governed by means of force, and the people desired to act as if there were no hierarchy and annex one another’s land.

== Family ==
Queens:

- Shen Jiang, of the Jiang clan of Shen (申姜 姜姓), a sister of the Count of Shen; the mother of Crown Prince Jing and You

Sons:

- Crown Prince Jing (太子靜; d. 782 BC), ruled as King Xuan of Zhou from 827 to 782 BC
- Prince You (王子友; d. 771 BC), ruled as Duke Huan of Zheng from 806 to 771 BC
  - Served as the Minister of Education of Zhou from 773 to 771 BC

== See also ==
- Family tree of Chinese monarchs (ancient)

== Sources ==
King Li of Zhou Zhou dynasty Died: 828 BC
Regnal titles
Preceded by King Yí of Zhou	King of China; 877–841 BC	Succeeded by Gong He
