= He, Earl of Gong =

He, Earl of Gong 共伯和

Earl of Gong
- Reign: ? - 841 BC; 828 BC - ?

Regent of Western Zhou
- Reign: 841 BC to 828 BC
- Predecessor: King Li of Zhou
- Successor: King Xuan of Zhou
- Born: Gongyi (共邑), State of Wei (衞國)

Chinese name
- Chinese: 共伯和
Transcriptions
Standard Mandarin
- Hanyu Pinyin: Gòng Bó Hé

He, Earl of Gong, ruled the State of Gong and held regency over Western Zhou after a rebellion occurred against King Li of Zhou. This period would be called the Gonghe Regency.

== Name ==
The status of He was not well-understood for a considerable amount of time, as the bo 伯 "earl" in his name was often omitted. This prompted traditional historiography to regard it as a literary allusion to Duke Mu of Shao and Duke Ding of Zhou, regarding it as a compound word roughly translating to "harmonious union," most notably in Records of the Grand Historian. However, with excavated texts such as Xinian (繫年) confirming He's role, the interpretation from the Bamboo Annals, which notes He as an earl, (Note: The Bamboo Annals were unearthed during Western Jin, and were also unavailable to Sima Qian) is considered standard practice. Arguments have been made for his name being a synonym for Duke Wu of Wei, but this has been debunked due to chronological issues separating the two by around 70 years; the similarities appear to be coincidental.

== Reign ==
Little is known about He as a ruler of the State of Gong; it was seemingly minor. His state was located in the site of Huxian in Henan, around the location of the Jiufeng branch of the Taihang Mountains, which was once known as Mt. Gong (共山). King Wu of Zhou had enfeoffed individuals of the Gong (共) surname there after the Battle of Muye. There was a state of the same name during the Shang dynasty, but it is unrelated, as it was located in modern-day Gansu Province.

=== Gonghe Regency ===
King Li of Zhou was, even in contemporary records, regarded as a corrupt, decadent ruler with little regard for the common people, and succeeded several controversial rulers. This prompted a rebellion against King Li that resulted in his exile from Western Zhou to Zhi (彘), leaving the dynasty without a ruler. He, the Earl of Gong, ascended the throne in 841 BC, which was regarded as the "First year of the Gonghe era" (共和元年) in historical annals, and his era the Gonghe Regency (共和行政). (Note: Sima Qian misunderstood the fact Gongbo He 共伯和 was a State-Title-Name structure. This citation is purely for the terminology from which his record standardised.) While some classical sources noted it as an usurpation, academia has regarded it more as a popular uprising. This is because Lüshi Chunqiu records people turning to him for help during King Li's failing reign and holding him as an example of virtue, using this scenario as a broader argument towards one's conduct breeding success.

After the regency, He returned to his home state of Gong. It is because of this that he is thought to have been a member of the Wey royal family. Once he returned to his state, the Bamboo Annals recorded that it rained heavily.
