= Da Yu ding =

- 大盂鼎
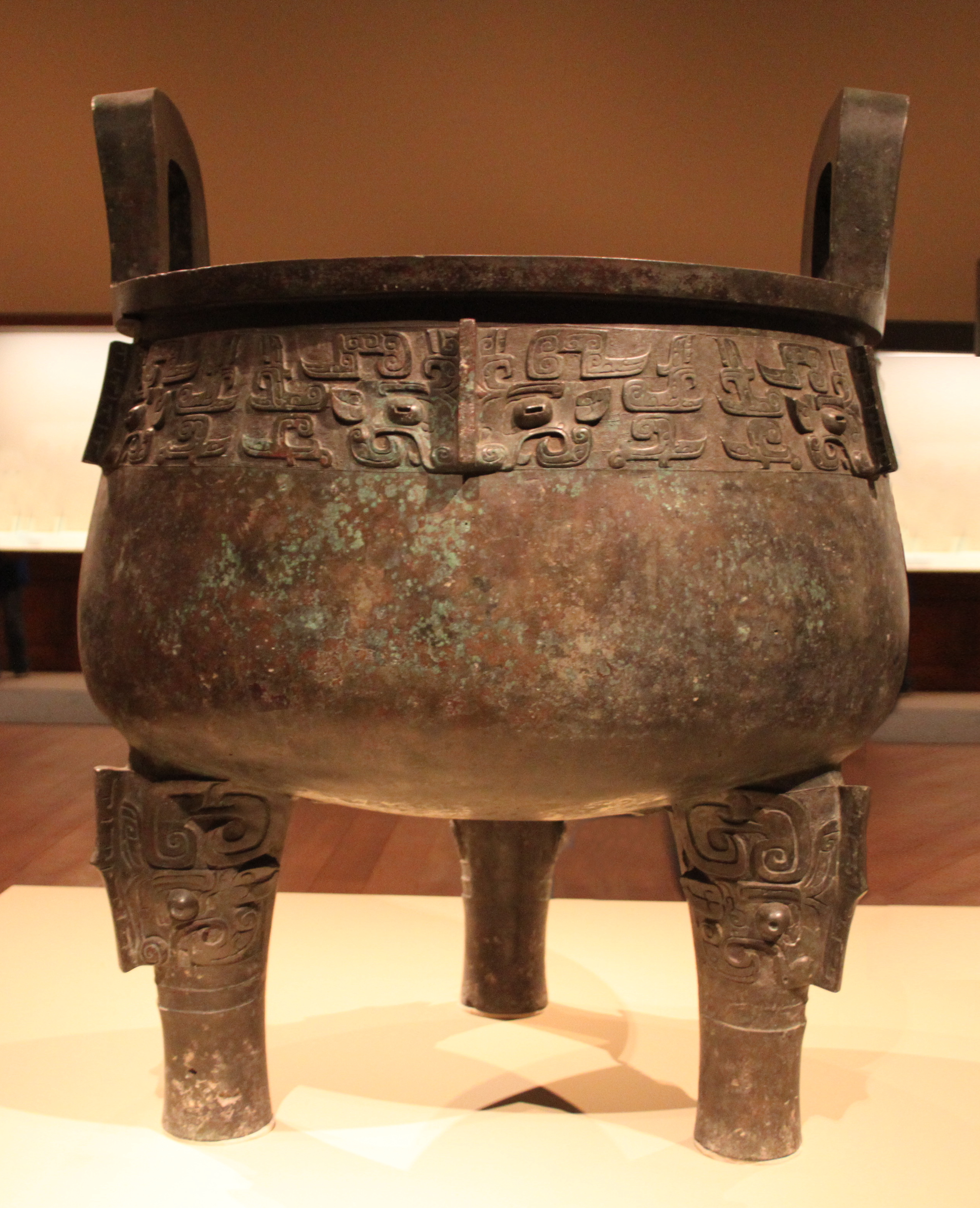
- The Da Yu ding is exhibited in the National Museum of China.
- Material: Bronze
- Height: 101.9 cm (40.1 in)
- Width: 77.8 cm (30.6 in)
- Weight: 153.5 kg (338 lb)
- Created: early 10th century BC
- Discovered: 1849; Li Village, Jingdang Township, Qishan County, Shaanxi
- Present location: National Museum of China

The Da Yu ding (Chinese: 大盂鼎; pinyin: Dà Yú dǐng) is an ancient Chinese bronze circular ding vessel from the Western Zhou dynasty (1046–771 BC). Excavated in Li Village, Jingdang Township, Qishan County, Shaanxi, it is on display in the National Museum of China.

The Da Yu ding, the Da Ke ding in the Shanghai Museum, and the Mao Gong ding in the National Palace Museum in Taipei are often mentioned together as a few of the most important pieces of ancient Chinese bronze vessels, and sometimes collectively called "Three Treasures of China" (（青铜器）海内三宝).

== Description ==
The tripod is round, with three legs, a common shape during the Western Zhou dynasty. It is 101.9 centimetres (40.1 in) high and weighs 153.5 kilograms (338 lb). Its aperture is 77.8 centimetres (30.6 in). Its mouth is engraved with Taotie patterns and its four legs are engraved with animal face patterns.

The ding is attributed to King Kang of Zhou (1020–996 BC), and the date of its inscription is stated by the ding to be in his 23rd Year (997 BC). The attribution to King Kang comes from the Xiao Yu ding, which was discovered alongside it and mentioned sacrifices that had been made to King Wen, King Wu, and King Cheng. Its design also compares well with other bronze artifacts from his period.

== Inscription ==
The tripod's inside features 19 lines collectively containing 291 Chinese characters. Most is the King's Speech. The first speech is a historical overview in which he provides a moral rationale for the fall of the Shang dynasty (c. 1600–1046 BC) and the rise of the Western Zhou. Here, the King said that drinking wine in excess has made the Shang dynasty lose the Mandate of Heaven, grace, and the army, while the Kings of Zhou do not drink excessively even ceremonially. The King further commands Yu (盂) to support the King and to work official service throughout days. The second speech is a short charge to Yu to emulate his late grandfather, Nang Gong. The third speech is the appointment of the king's minister with army power and a detailed inventory given by the King. The last section of the inscription is Yu himself recording that he made this tripod for his deceased grandfather Nang Gong in response to the king's kindness. It was the king's 23rd year. The inclusion of 1726 slaves in the listed inventory is an important historical resource for studying slavery.

Da Yu ding inscription
Name	Artifact	Inscription	Translation
Da Yu ding 大盂鼎; 981 BCE (King Kang)			It was in the ninth month when the King was at Zongzhou (宗周). The King charged Yu (盂) saying, “Yu! Shining King Wen (文王) received the great mandate from Heaven. When King Wu (武王) succeeded Wen, he created a state, opening hidden lands, possessing all the four quarters, and setting right their peoples. In ceremonial affairs involving wine, oh! – he permitted no excess; at sacrificial rites, he permitted no drunkenness. Hence Heaven in its greatness watched closely over its sons and protected the former Kings in their possession of the four quarters. I have heard that the Yin (殷) loss of the mandate was due to the fact that its greater and lesser lords and the many officials assisting the Yin sank into drunkenness and so were bereft of their city. “You have helped me from the hazy dawn of my youth: When I was engaged in my youthful studies, you never coerced me but always helped me. Now I am attempting to emulate and grasp the upright virtue of King Wen, and charge the many officials as he did. Now I charge you to assist Rong in attending to the constancy of harmonious virtue: be assiduous in remonstrating with me from dawn to dusk serving in awe of Heaven’s awesomeness.” The King said, “Oh! I charge you Yu to emulate your late grandfather Nan Gong (南公), whom you succeed.” The King said, “Yu, assist me by overseeing until death the affairs of war. Assiduously remonstrate and upbraid me. From dawn to dusk help me to govern the four quarters and follow the former Kings in receiving charge of the people and the lands. “I give to you a flask of sacrificial liquors, ceremonial cap, robes, kneepads, and sandals, and a chariot with horse. I present to you the banner of your late grandfather Nan Gong for you to lead in hunting. I give to you four estate officials and 659 servant from charioteers to common peasants. I give you thirteen officials of the rank of King’s officers to guard your borders, and along with them 1,050 servants (人鬲). Move them promptly from their current lands.” The King said, “Yu! Be attentive to your government and do not disobey my charge.” In gratitude for the favors of the King, Yu casts this precious cauldron for his late grandfather Nan Gong. It was in the King’s twenty-third sacrificial year.

== History ==
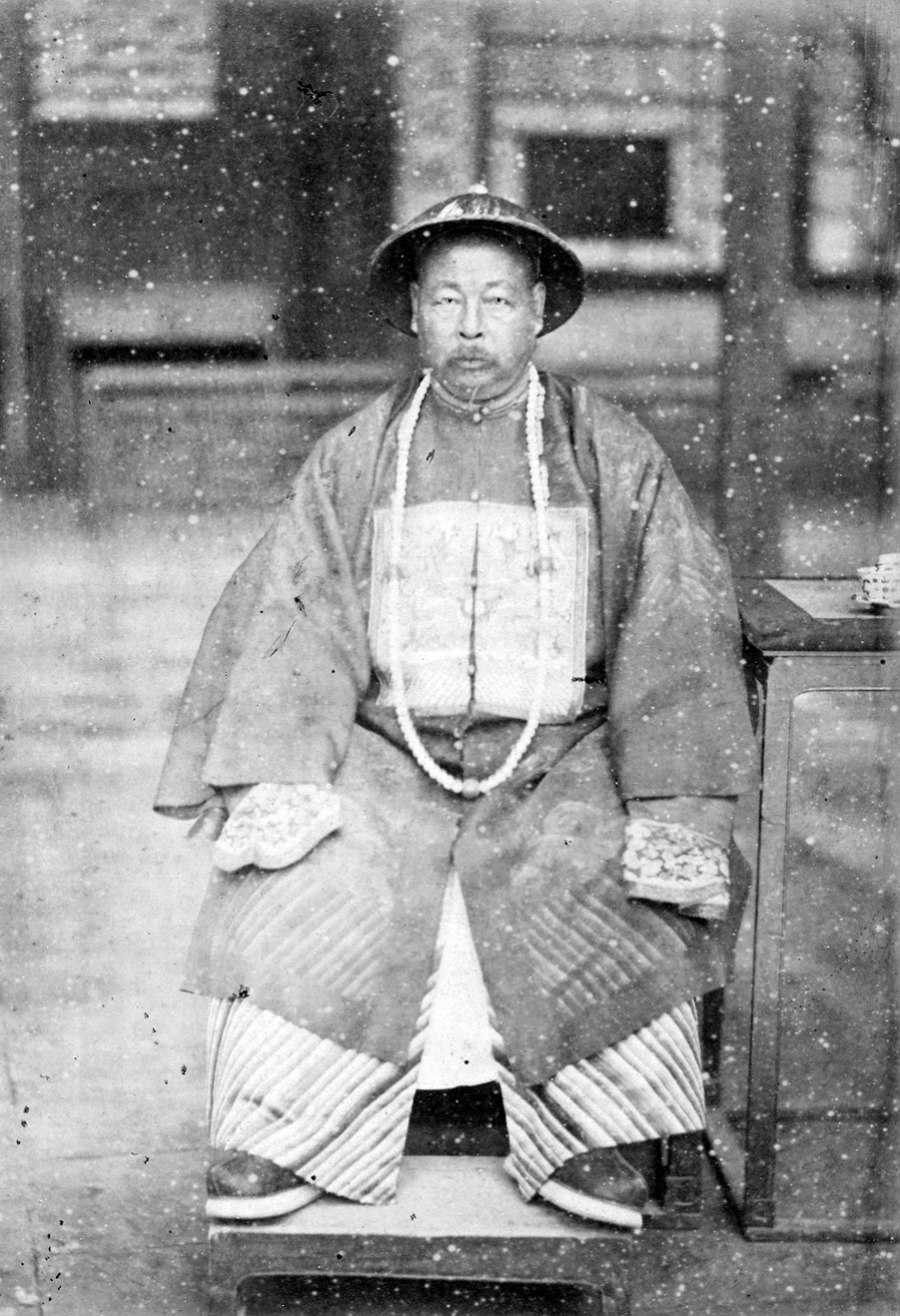
Zuo Zongtang (1812–1885), the fifth owner of the Da Yu ding

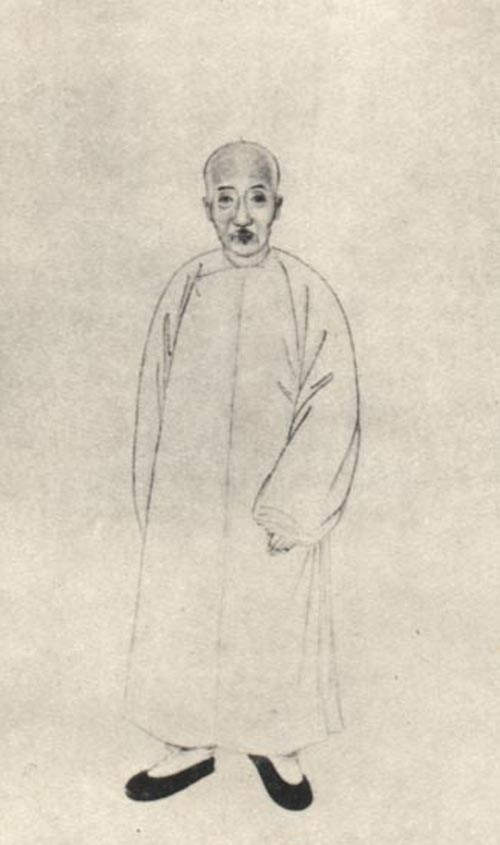
Pan Zuyin (1830–1890), the sixth owner of the Da Yu ding

In the Daoguang era (1821–1851) of the Qing dynasty (1644–1911), this tripod was unearthed in Li village, Jingdang Township, Qishan County, Shaanxi. Song Jinjian (宋金鑒; 1821–1863), a local rich man, acquired it. Next, the governor Zhou Gengsheng (周庚盛) expropriated it. After he died, Song Jinjian recovered the tripod.

Before winter 1873, Yuan Baoheng (袁保恆; 1826–1878), a follower of Zuo Zongtang bought it for 700 taels of silver. Yuan may have sent the tripod he bought to Zuo. In 1875, Zuo Zongtang presented the tripod he treasured as a gift to Pan Zuyin (潘祖蔭; 1830–1890) in Beijing. Pan Zuyin was a famous collector with rich knowledge in Chinese characters. In 1890, Pan acquired the Da Ke ding, the second largest bronzeware of the Western Zhou dynasty after the Da Yu ding. His younger brother Pan Zunian (潘祖年; 1870–1925) inherited the family property. In about 1896, the Pan family moved to Suzhou from Beijing with their collection, including the two tripods.

In 1937, the Second Sino-Japanese War broke out. Fearing looting or destruction, the Pan family packed the two tripods in a wood box and buried it.

In 1951, Pan Dayu (潘達于; 1906–2007) donated the two tripods to the Shanghai Museum. There, they would be displayed together until 1959, when the Da Yu ding was transferred to the National Museum of China in Beijing. In March 2004, to celebrate Pan Dayu's 100 birthday, the Da Yu ding was transferred to the Shanghai Museum for a limited time display, the first time the tripods were together in nearly 50 years.

== See also ==
- List of Chinese cultural relics forbidden to be exhibited abroad
