= Da Ke ding =

Ancient Chinese bronze circular ding

- 大克鼎
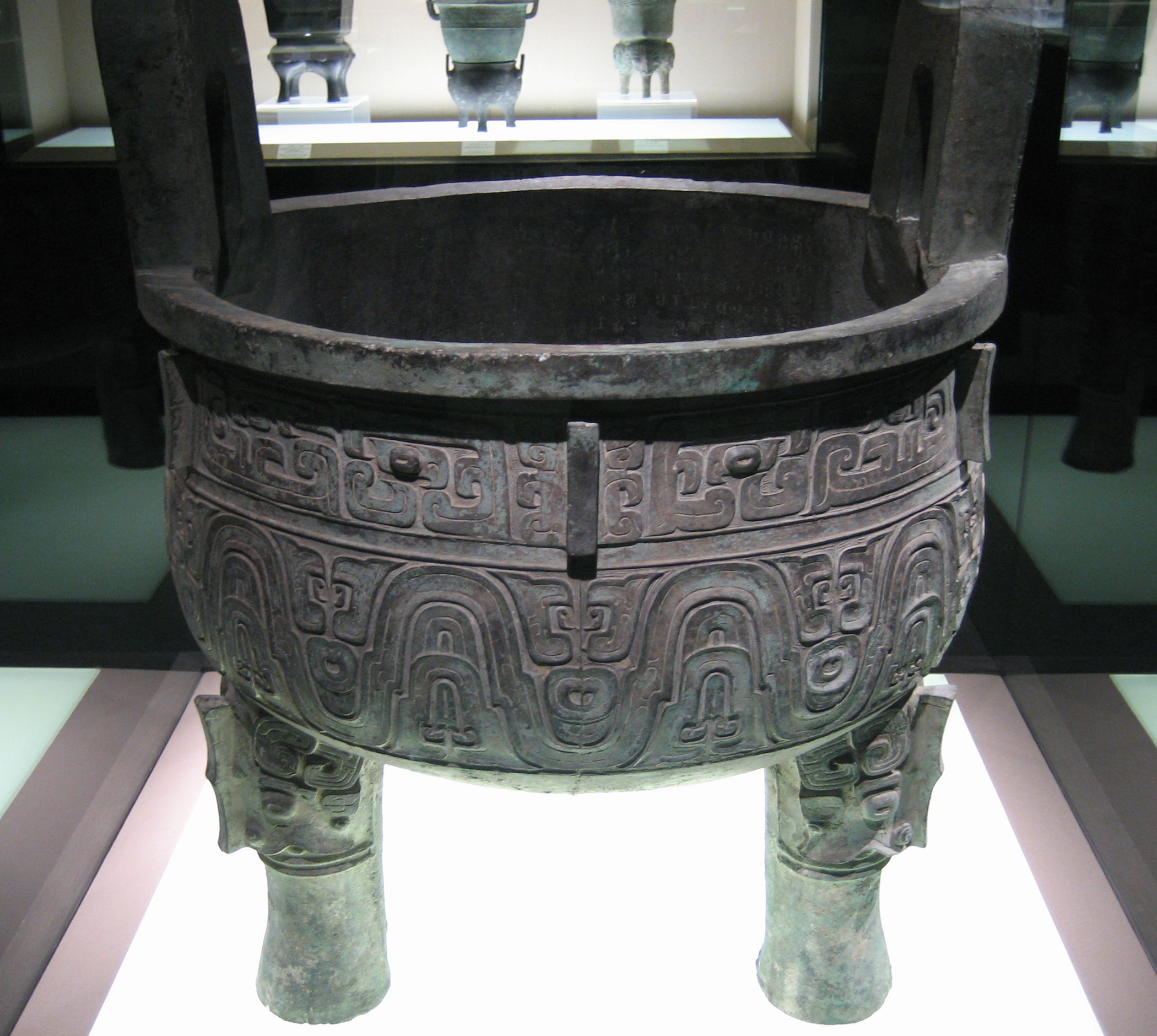
- The Da Ke ding is exhibited in the Shanghai Museum.
- Material: Bronze
- Height: 93.1-centimetre (36.7 in)
- Width: 75.6-centimetre (29.8 in) (bore); 74.9-centimetre (29.5 in) (inside diameter)
- Weight: 201.5-kilogram (444 lb)
- Created: Western Zhou (1046–771 BC)
- Discovered: 1890; Famen Town, Fufeng County, Shaanxi
- Present location: Shanghai Museum

Da Ke ding
- Chinese: 大克鼎
Transcriptions
Standard Mandarin
- Hanyu Pinyin: Dà Kè dǐng
- IPA: [tâ kʰɤ̂ tìŋ]

The Da Ke ding (Chinese: 大克鼎; pinyin: Dà Kè dǐng) is an ancient Chinese bronze ding vessel from the Western Zhou dynasty (1046–771 BC). It was unearthed in 1890 in Fufeng County, Shaanxi, after being buried for nearly 3000 years, and it is now on display in the Shanghai Museum. Along with the Da Yu ding in the National Museum of China and the Mao Gong ding in the National Palace Museum in Taipei, the Da Ke ding has been called one of the "Three Treasures of China".

== Description ==
The tripod is round, with three legs and two ears, a common shape during the Western Zhou dynasty (1046–771 BC). It is 93.1-centimetre (36.7 in) high and weights 201.5-kilogram (444 lb). Its inside diameter is 74.9-centimetre (29.5 in) with a bore of 75.6-centimetre (29.8 in). Its mouth was engraved with Taotie patterns and its abdomen was engraved with wave patterns, and its ears was engraved with Chinese dragon patterns.

== Inscription ==
The tripod has 290 Chinese characters in 28 lines inside the tripod. The inscriptions recorded that the monarch of the Western Zhou dynasty awarded slaves and land to the nobleman, Ke (克). Ke cast it to commemorate his ancestors and the glory bestowed by the king, and the process of awarding is described in detail in the inscription on the inner wall. These inscriptions give us the opportunity to understand the etiquette and land system of the Zhou Dynasty three thousand years ago.

== History ==
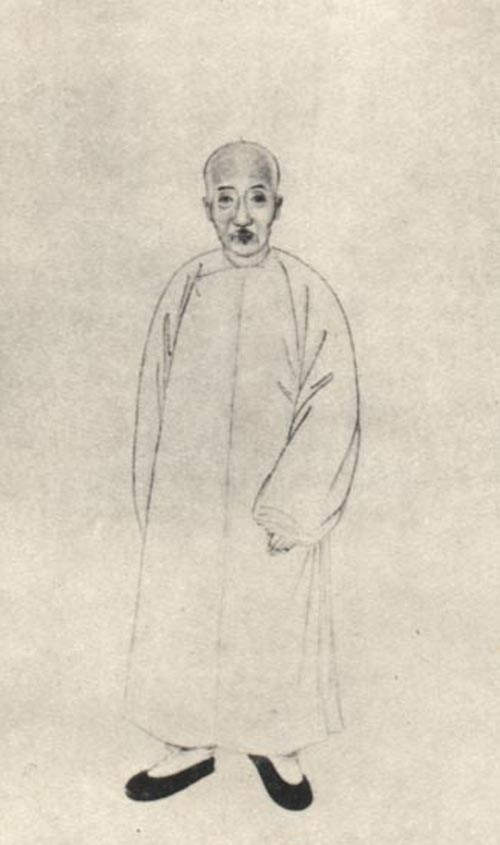
Pan Zuyin (1830–1890), the third owner of the Da Ke ding. After he got the Da Yu ding and Da Ke ding, he became the top of collectors home and abroad for bronze wares. It's known to the world that three treasures in the world, these two tripods brought great credit to the Pan family.

In 1890, namely the 16th year of Guangxu period (1875–1908) in the Qing dynasty (1644–1911), the tripod was excavated from a cellar in Famen Town, Fufeng County, Shaanxi, with more than 1,200 bronze wares, including seven Xiao Ke ding (小克鼎) and a set of Bianzhong. After hearing the news, Ke Shaotai (柯劭态; 柯劭態), a Tianjin collector bought it immediately.

Pan Zuyin (1830–1890), a politician and collector spent a huge amount of money on the tripod. Before he bought Da Ke ding, he has already got the Da Yu ding, the largest bronzeware of the Western Zhou dynasty. Therefore, Pan became the top of collectors home and abroad for bronze wares. It's known to the world that three treasures in the world, these two tripods brought great credit to the Pan family. Pan specially built an exquisite pavilion in his house, which he named "Pangu Pavilion" (攀古楼; 攀古樓) to preserve the two tripods. Pan couldn't get a son to inherit his family property. After his death, his younger brother Pan Zunian (潘祖年; 1870–1925) inherited the family property. Before Pan Zunian died, his granddaughter-in-law kneeled in front of him and promised to protect the tripod unless she died. Then he nodded his head and died. At that time, the males of the Pan family all died off. The 19-year-old Pan Dayu (潘达于; 潘達于; 1906–2007) took responsibility of protecting the tripods and other cultural relics.

In 1937, the Second Sino-Japanese War broke out. Pan Dayu risked her relatives to go back to the house in Suzhou. They asked a carpenter to make a big wooden box. At night, it was dark everywhere in Suzhou. Under candlelight, they lifted the bricks under the long table and dug a big hole. The big box was put into the hole with the two tripods crossing inside. They closed the box, earthed it up and replaced the bricks. Shortly afterwards, Suzhou was occupied by the Japanese army. Matsui (松井), the Japanese commander, heard that there were two tripods in the Pan's house. It was exactly him that sent a Japanese division to Pan's house to plunder the two tripods. One day, a truck fully loaded with Japanese soldiers stopped in front of a house in South Gravel Street. The Japanese soldiers unloaded the heavy water bump from the truck and pumped the water in the lotus pond completely. Then they jumped into the muddy pond and dug every corner of the pond with shovels. They dug till sun set but got nothing. Since then, they rushed into Pan's house every day to search something. Pan Dayu kept the two tripods with her family for decades. They lived through the trouble times eventually.

In 1951, two years after the Communist State was established, the Shanghai Cultural Relics Management Committee began to organize the Shanghai Museum. After getting the news, Pan Dayu wrote a short letter, intending to donate the two tripods to Shanghai Museum. A few months later, Liu Ruli (刘汝醴; 劉汝醴) and Shen Gengmei (沈羹梅) went to Suzhou accompanied by Pan Jiahua (潘家华; 潘家華), daughter of Pan Dayu, to take the tripods. Mao Dun (1896–1981), the Minister of Culture, personally inscribed an honorary credential for her. The Da Ke ding has always been kept there since that time. In 1959, the Da Yu ding was transferred to Beijing and became one of the most valuable treasure in National Museum of China. In March 2004, in order to celebrate Pan Dayu's 100 birthday, the Da Yu ding was transferred to Shanghai Museum for a special and short display, marking their reunion after half a century.

On January 21, 2018, the Da Ke ding was featured on the Chinese TV program National Treasure. Jackson Yee, Xu Yongxiang and Pan Yuyi, presented the historical background of Da Ke Ding.

== See also ==
- List of Chinese cultural relics forbidden to be exhibited abroad
