= Ampoule (vessel) =

Ancient Chinese ritual vessel

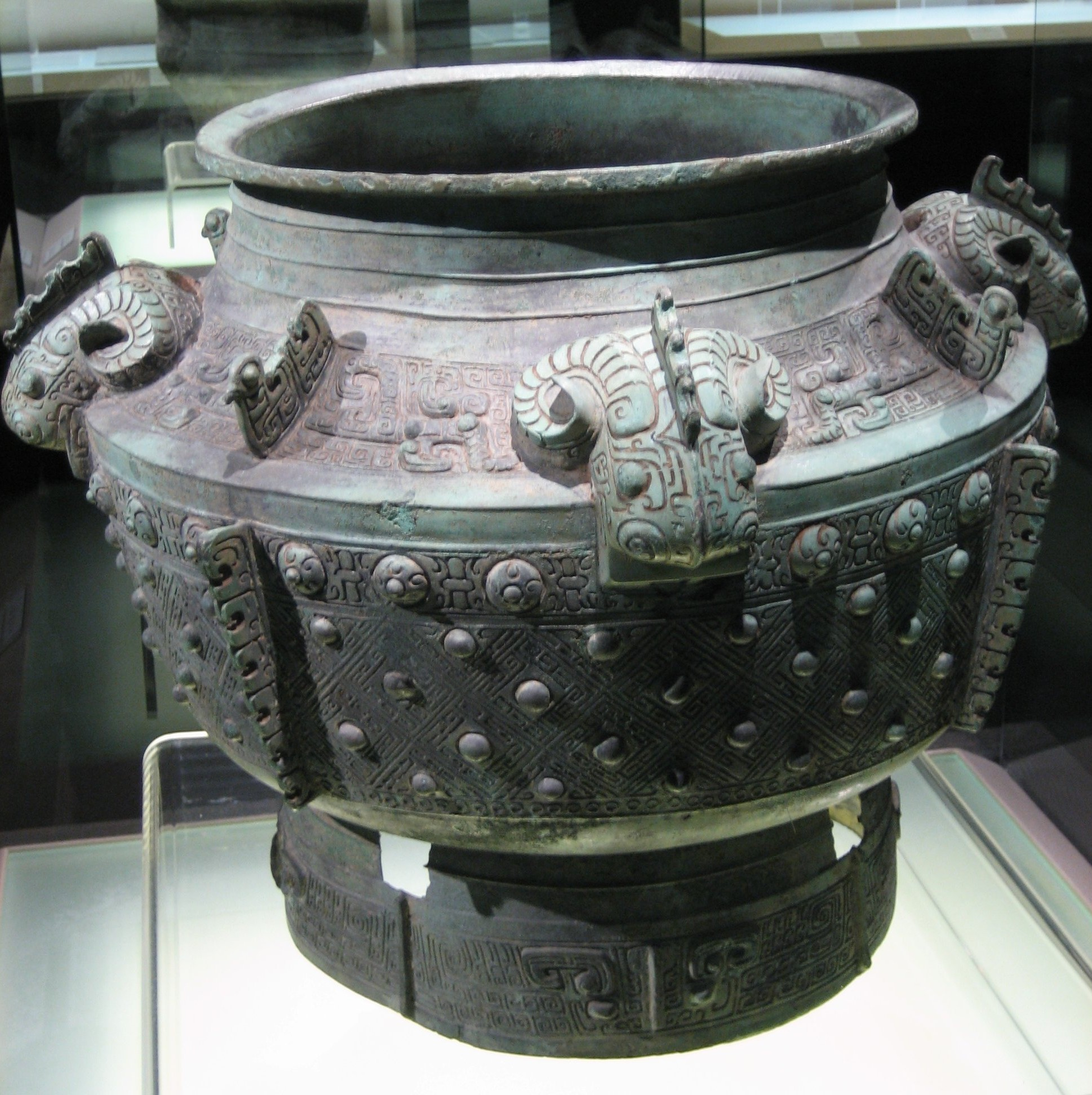

Ampoule is an ancient Chinese ritual vessel, made of bronze or clay, used to hold water, wine, sauce and other things. Popular from the Shang Dynasty to the Eastern Zhou Dynasty. The shape of the ampoule resembles a respect, but it is shorter than a respect. There are round and square, with or without handle. The handles are mostly beast-headed, with big abdomen, ringed feet, cramped mouth, and lid. The body is often decorated with gluttonous patterns, milk nail patterns, cloud and thunder patterns.

The body is often decorated with gluttonous patterns, milk nail patterns, cloud and thunder patterns. One of the four sheep head ampoule is hidden in the Shanghai Museum.

Yang Xiong's "Dialect" mentioned that "Fo is the ampule. The smaller one is the bottle." " Guang Ya " says "Ampule, 缶也. Also bottle." The ampule and the缶may be the same object.
