= Pan Zuyin =

Qing dynasty mandarin and art collector (1830–1890)

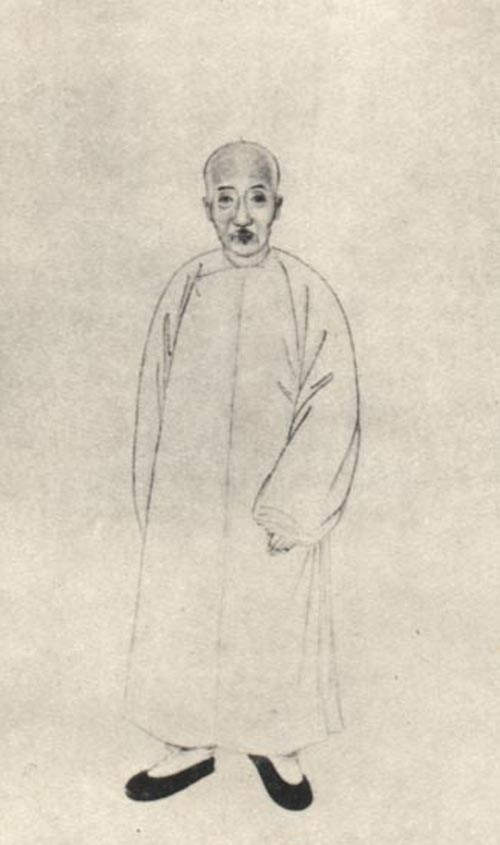

Grand Councilor
- In office 15 December 1882 – 3 March 1883

Minister of Justice
- In office 18 June 1879 – 3 March 1883
- Preceded by: Weng Tonghe
- Succeeded by: Zhang Zhiwan

Minister of Works
- In office 3 January 1886 – 11 December 1890
- Preceded by: Weng Tonghe
- Succeeded by: Qi Shichang
- In office 2 April 1879 – 18 June 1879
- Preceded by: He Shouci
- Succeeded by: Weng Tonghe

Personal details
- Born: 30 January 1830
- Died: 11 December 1890 (aged 60)
- Relations: Pan Shi'en (grandfather)
- Education: Jinshi degree in the Imperial Examination
- Courtesy name: Boyin (伯寅)
- Art name: Longweidong Tianzhu (龍威洞天主)
- Posthumous name: Wenqin (文勤)

Pan Zuyin
- Traditional Chinese: 潘祖蔭
- Simplified Chinese: 潘祖荫
Transcriptions
Standard Mandarin
- Hanyu Pinyin: Pān Zǔyīn
- Wade–Giles: P'an^{1} Tsu^{3}-yin^{1}

Pan Zuyin (30 January 1830 – 11 December 1890) was a high-ranking Qing dynasty mandarin and a major art collector. He was president of the Board of Works (Gongbu shangshu 工部尚書), president of Board of War (Bingbu shangshu 兵部尚書), and grand councilor (Junji dachen 軍機大臣). In 1860, Zuo Zongtang (1812–1885), the Viceroy of Shaan-Gan was claimed to impeachment in the court. At that time, Pan Zuyin, a politician in the Qing governor to Zuo Zongtang submitted three petitions to the Xianfeng Emperor (1831–1861). Pan said that the country could not do without Hunan and Hunan could not do without Zuo Zongtang. It moved the Xianfeng Emperor greatly and saved Zuo Zongtang. In 1875, Zuo Zongtang presented Da Yu ding he treasured as a gift to Pan Zuyin in return for his great assist. Pan Zuyin was a famous collector with rich knowledge in Chinese characters. In Beijing, he has "Pangu Pavilion" (攀古楼; 攀古樓) to preserve antiques including ancient bronzes. In 1872, he wrote "Pangu Pavilion Bronze inscriptions". Later, in 1890, Pan acquired the Da Ke ding, the second largest bronzeware of the Western Zhou dynasty after the Da Yu ding. These two tripods brought great credit to the Pan family. Pan couldn't get a son to inherit his family property. In 1883, Pan retired for his father's funeral. In 1890, Pan died in Beijing. His younger brother Pan Zunian (潘祖年; 1870–1925) inherited the family property.
