= Ding (vessel) =

Chinese cauldron with legs and handles

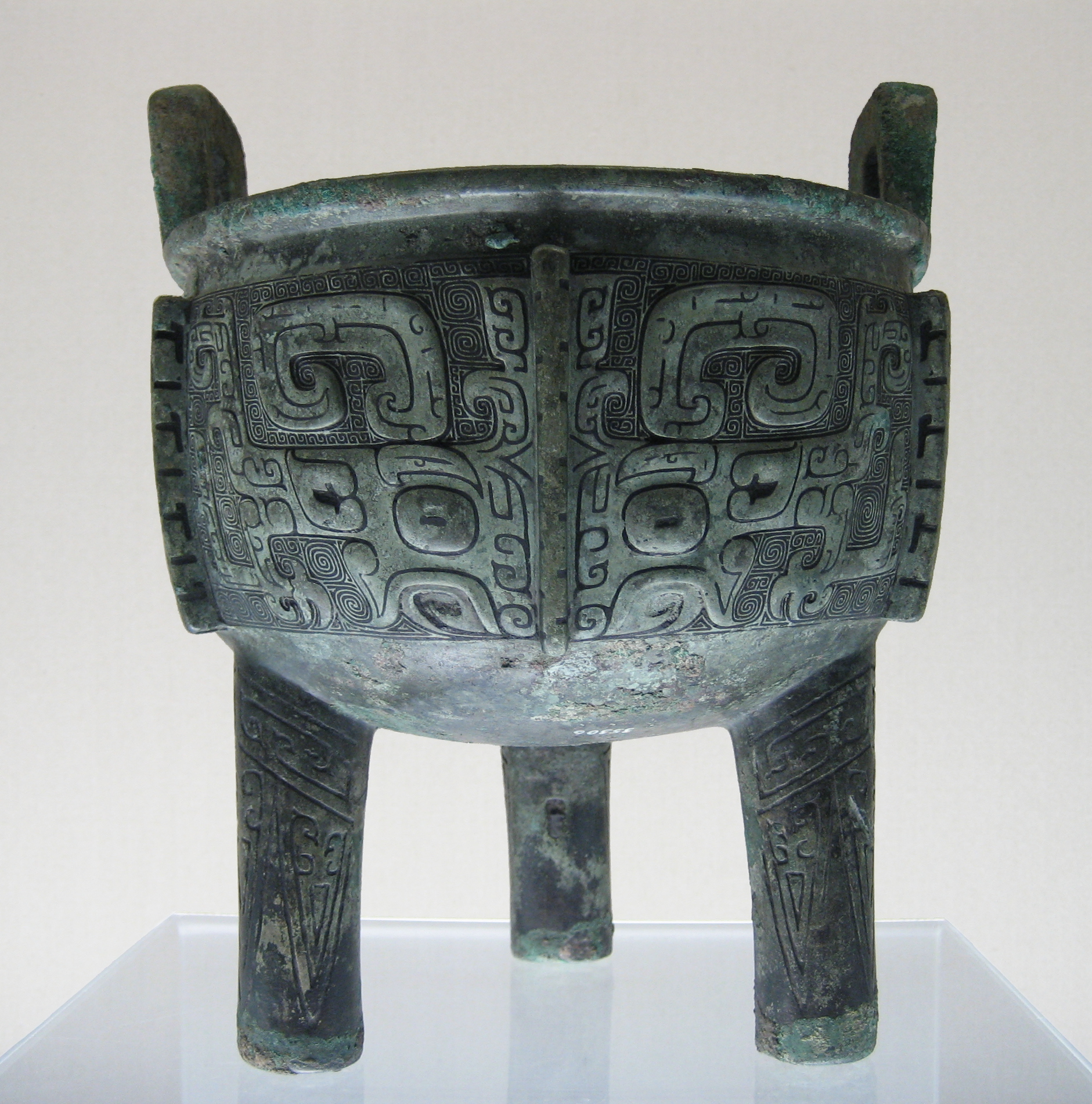
- A ding from the late Shang dynasty
- Chinese: 鼎
Transcriptions
Standard Mandarin
- Hanyu Pinyin: dǐng
- Wade–Giles: ting^{3}
- IPA: [tìŋ]
Yue: Cantonese
- Yale Romanization: díng
- Jyutping: ding^{2}
- IPA: [tɪŋ˧˥]
Southern Min
- Hokkien POJ: tiáⁿ (col.) téng (lit.)
Old Chinese
- Baxter–Sagart (2014): *tˤengʔ
- Zhengzhang: *kleːŋʔ

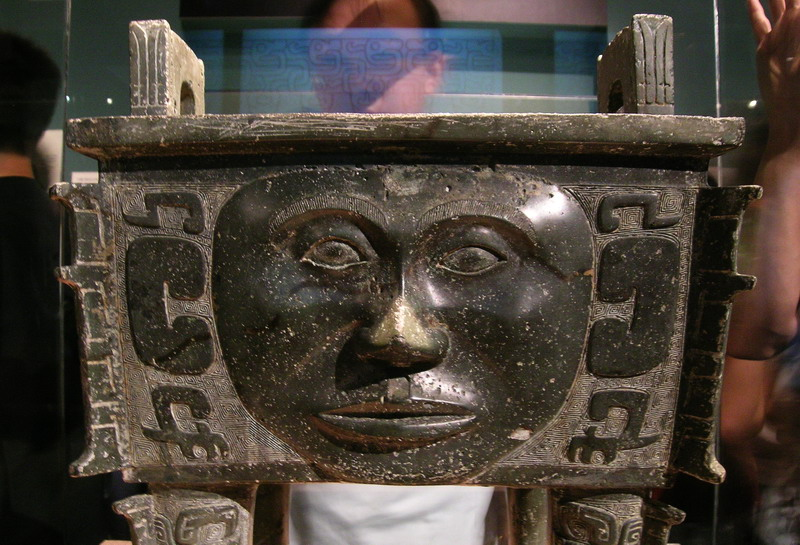
Da He ding; the human face is a highly unusual decoration.

Ding (Chinese: 鼎; pinyin: dǐng) are prehistoric and ancient Chinese cauldrons standing upon legs with a lid and two facing handles. They are one of the most important shapes used in Chinese ritual bronzes. They were made in two shapes: round vessels with three legs and rectangular ones with four, the latter often called fāng dǐng (方鼎; 'square ding'). They were used for cooking, storage, and ritual offerings to the gods or to ancestors.

The earliest recovered examples are ceramic tripods from the Neolithic Peiligang culture, but they are better known from the Chinese Bronze Age, particularly after the Zhou deemphasized the ritual use of huangjiu alcohol practiced by the Shang kings. Under the Zhou, the ding and the privilege to perform the associated rituals became symbols of authority. The number of permitted ding varied according to one's rank in the Chinese nobility: the Nine Ding of the Zhou kings were a symbol of their rule over all China but were lost by the first emperor, Shi Huangdi in the late 3rd century BCE. Subsequently, imperial authority was represented by the Heirloom Seal of the Realm, carved out of the sacred Heshibi; it was lost at some point during the Five Dynasties after the collapse of the Tang.

== Function and use ==
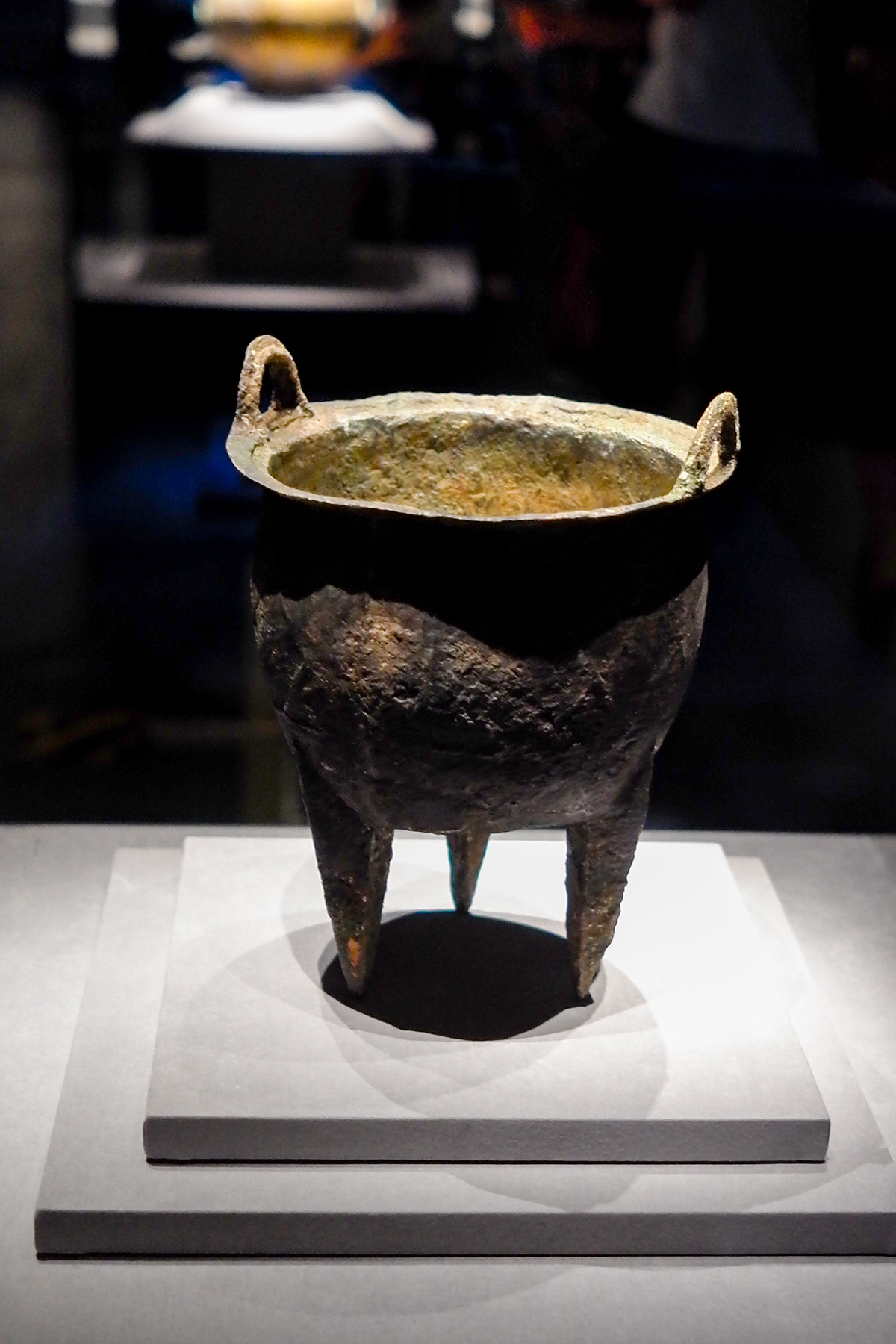
An early bronze ding of the Erlitou culture (1900–1500 BCE)

In Chinese history and culture, possession of one or more ancient ding is often associated with power and dominion over the land. Therefore, the ding is often used as an implicit symbolism for power. The term "inquiring of the ding" (問鼎; wèn dǐng) is often used interchangeably with the quest for power.

In the early Bronze Age of China, the use of wine and food vessels served a religious purpose. While ding were the most important food vessels, wine vessels were the more prominent ritual bronzes of this time, likely due to the belief in Shamanism and spirit worship. Ding were used to make ritual sacrifices, both human and animal, to ancestors. They varied in size, but were generally quite large, indicating that whole animals were likely sacrificed. The sacrifices were meant to appease ancestors due to the Shang belief that spirits had the capability to affect the world of the living. If the ancestors were happy, the living would be blessed with good fortune.

During the early Western Zhou dynasty, the people underwent a political and cultural change. King Wu of Zhou believed that the Shang people were drunkards. He believed that their over-consumption of wine led their king to lose the Mandate of Heaven, thus leading to the downfall of the Shang dynasty. Because of this belief, food vessels (and ding in particular) replaced wine vessels in importance. Bronze vessels underwent what has been called the "Ritual Revolution". This theory suggests that because there was a change in decor as well as the types and variations of vessels found in tombs, their function shifted from solely religious to a more secular one. Instead of sacrificing food to appease ancestors, the Zhou used ding to show off the status of the deceased to both the living and spirits. Ding symbolized status. For example, emperors were buried with nine ding, feudal lords with seven, ministers with five, and scholar-bureaucrats with three or one. The vessels served as symbols of authority for the elite far into the Warring States period.

== Form and construction ==
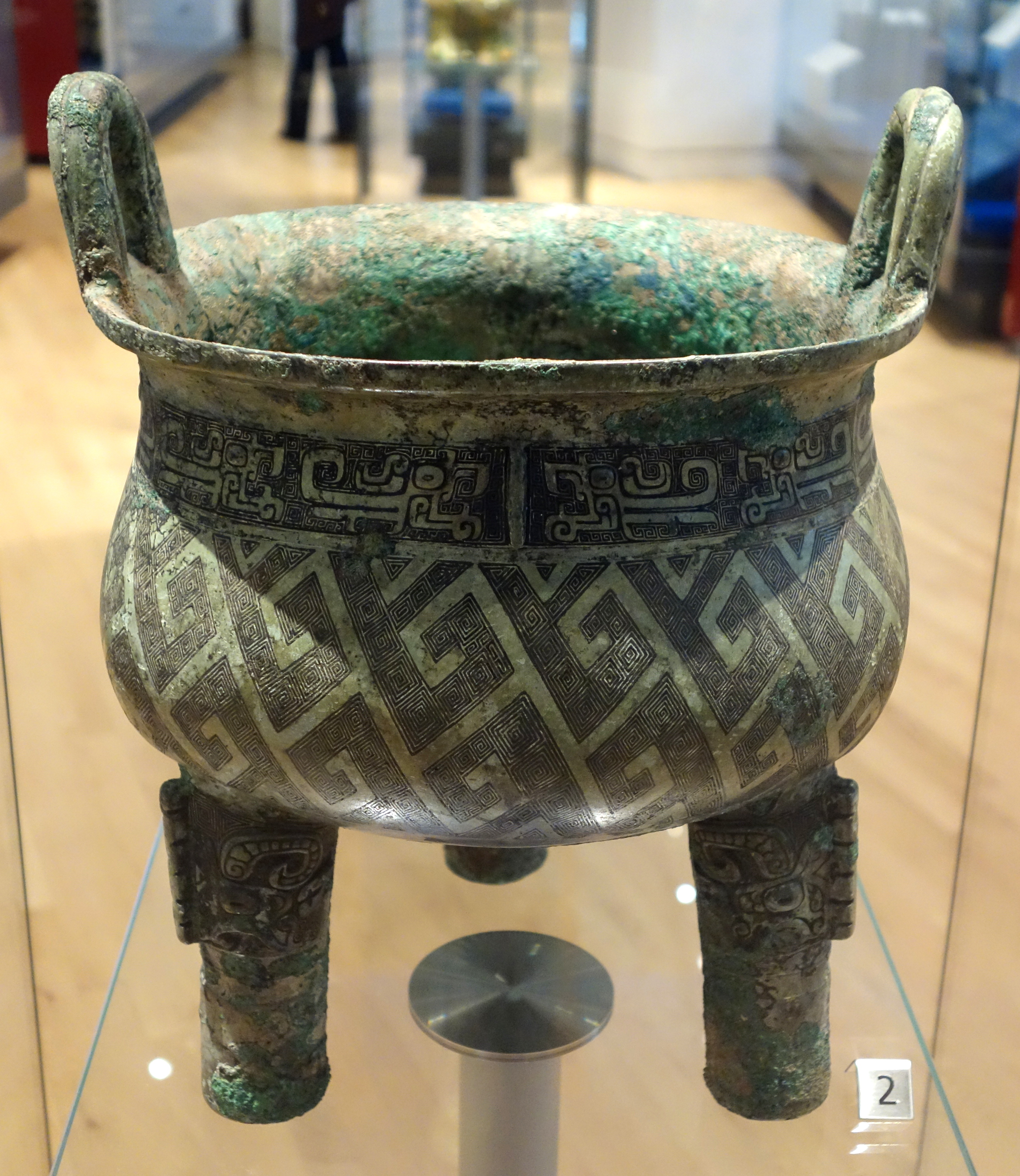
Shang dynasty, 1300–1046 BCE

Like other ritual bronze shapes, the ding was originally an ordinary ceramic cooking, serving and storage vessel, dating back to the Chinese Neolithic, and ceramic dings continued to be used during and after the period when ceremonial bronze versions were made. From the time of the Shang dynasty in the 2nd millennium BCE, dings were also cast in bronze as high-status "ritual bronzes", which were often buried in the tomb of their owners for use in the afterlife. This is the period to which the oldest examples of bronze dings date. Inscriptions found on dings and zhongs are used to study bronzeware script.

== Theories on construction ==
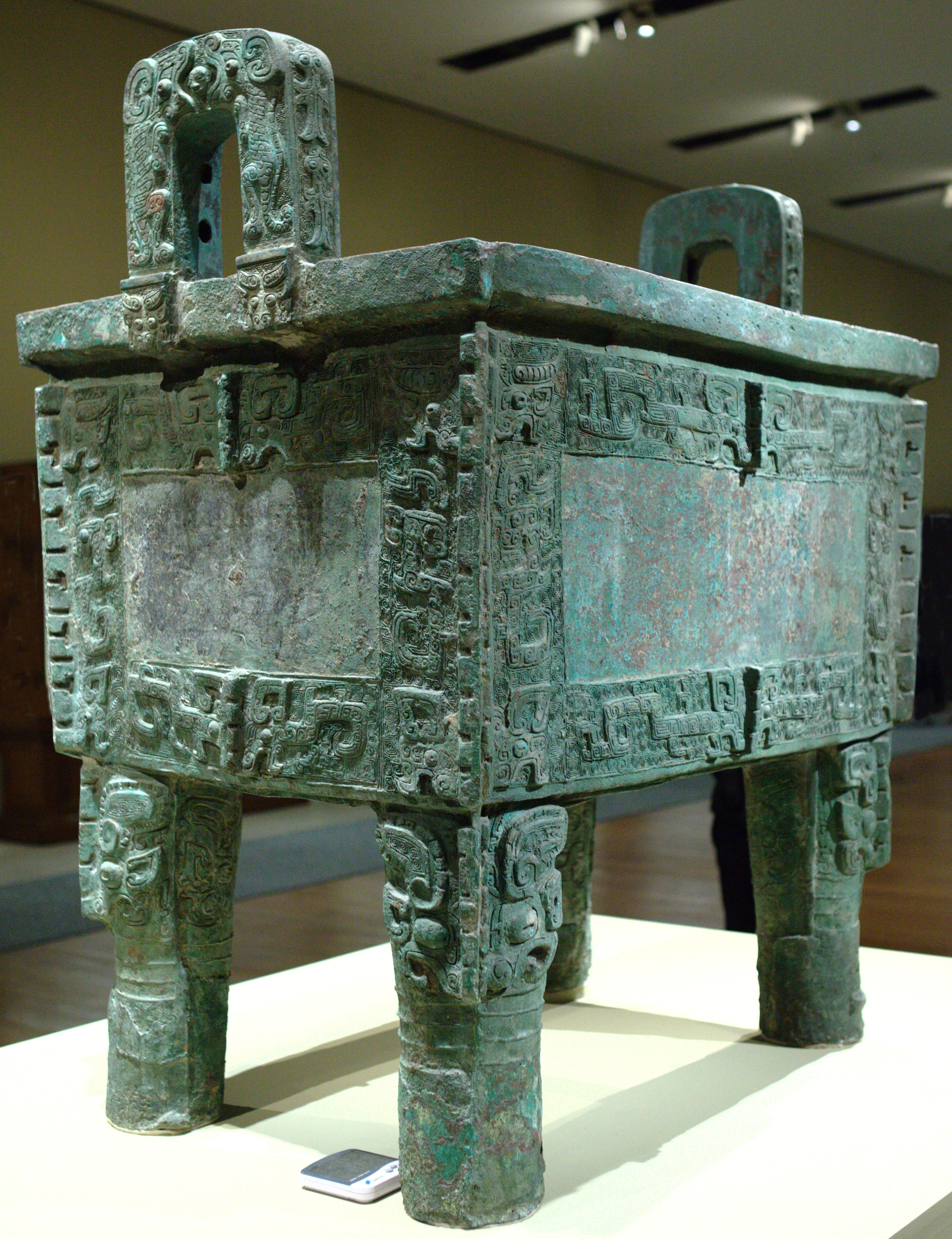
The Houmuwu Ding is the largest piece of bronze work found from the ancient world so far. It was made in the late Shang dynasty at Anyang.

The most commonly believed bronze vessel casting process of ancient Chinese vessels is the piece mold process. In this process, a model of the finished vessel, complete with décor, is made of clay and left to harden. Next, a negative of this is made by adding a layer of wet clay to the completed model and allowed to harden to the point where it can still be cut away from it. The model would then be shaved down to form the core, which would eventually become the empty interior of the completed vessel. In the final step, the negative layer was replaced around the core; these were held apart by small bronze and copper pieces called chaplets until the molten bronze could be poured into the opening and fill the empty space between the two layers. When the bronze had cooled, the clay would be broken away from the vessel and the process was complete.

A newer variation on the piece mold process was put forth as a way to explain asymmetrical faces on vessels which, as a rule, should be symmetrical. It was proposed that décor was not made on a model and then transferred to the outer mold layer, but that the décor was carved into and built up on the outer, shell layer as the first step. Décor was added in a variety of ways. The first was by simply carving and incising lines into the clay mold layer. The second was to stamp or press an image, inscription, or design into the wet clay. The third was a technique called tube lining. In this technique, soft, liquid clay would be put into a leather bag and piped onto a surface through some kind of very fine tube made of metal or bone. This technique would have been quite intensive, as it was difficult to maintain constant pressure on the bag, which was needed to create even lines; however, because of certain types of décor, such as thunder or quill patterns, this would have been the most likely technique used to create low relief design in this process.

== Decoration ==
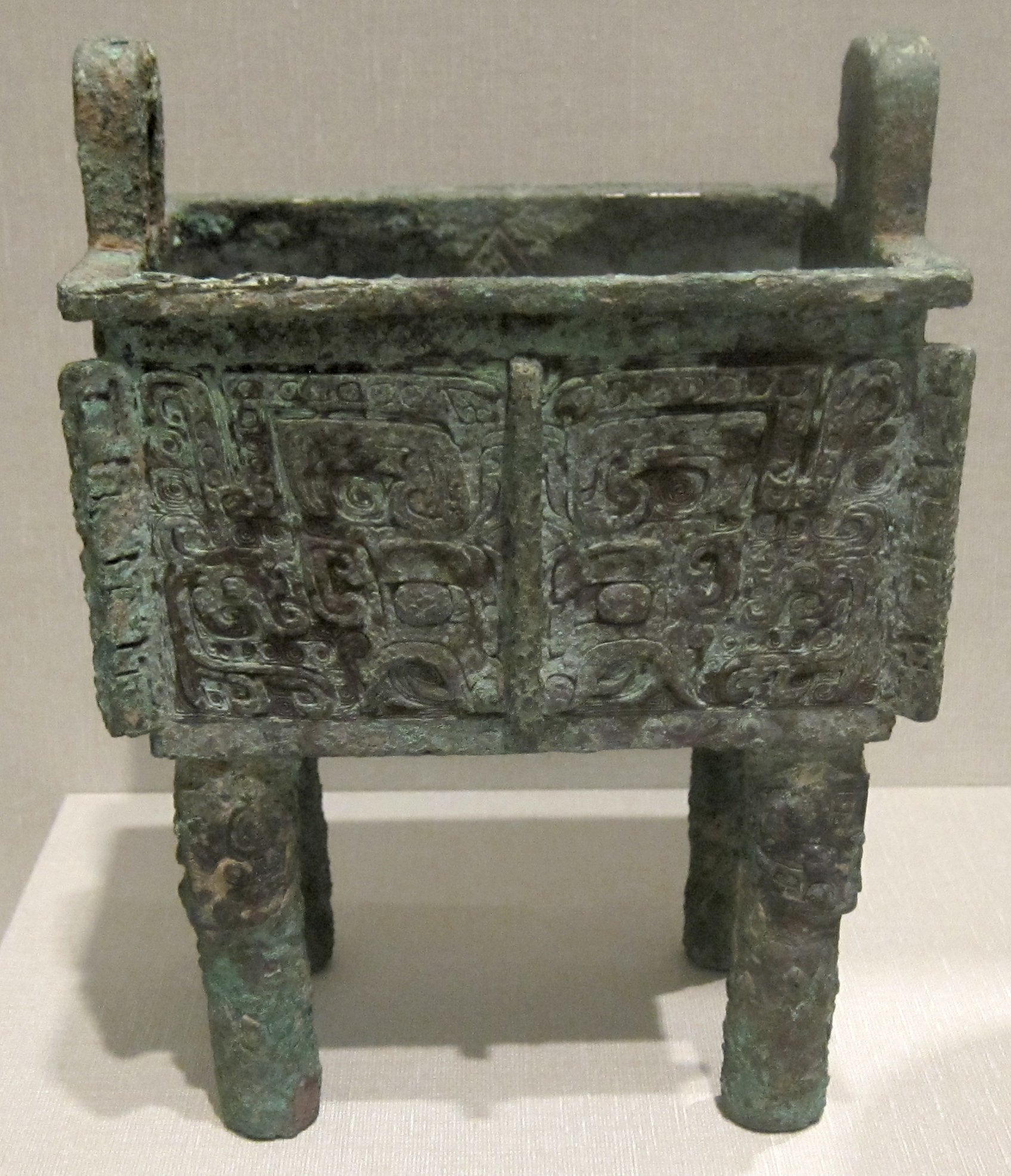
Shang fangding with taotie

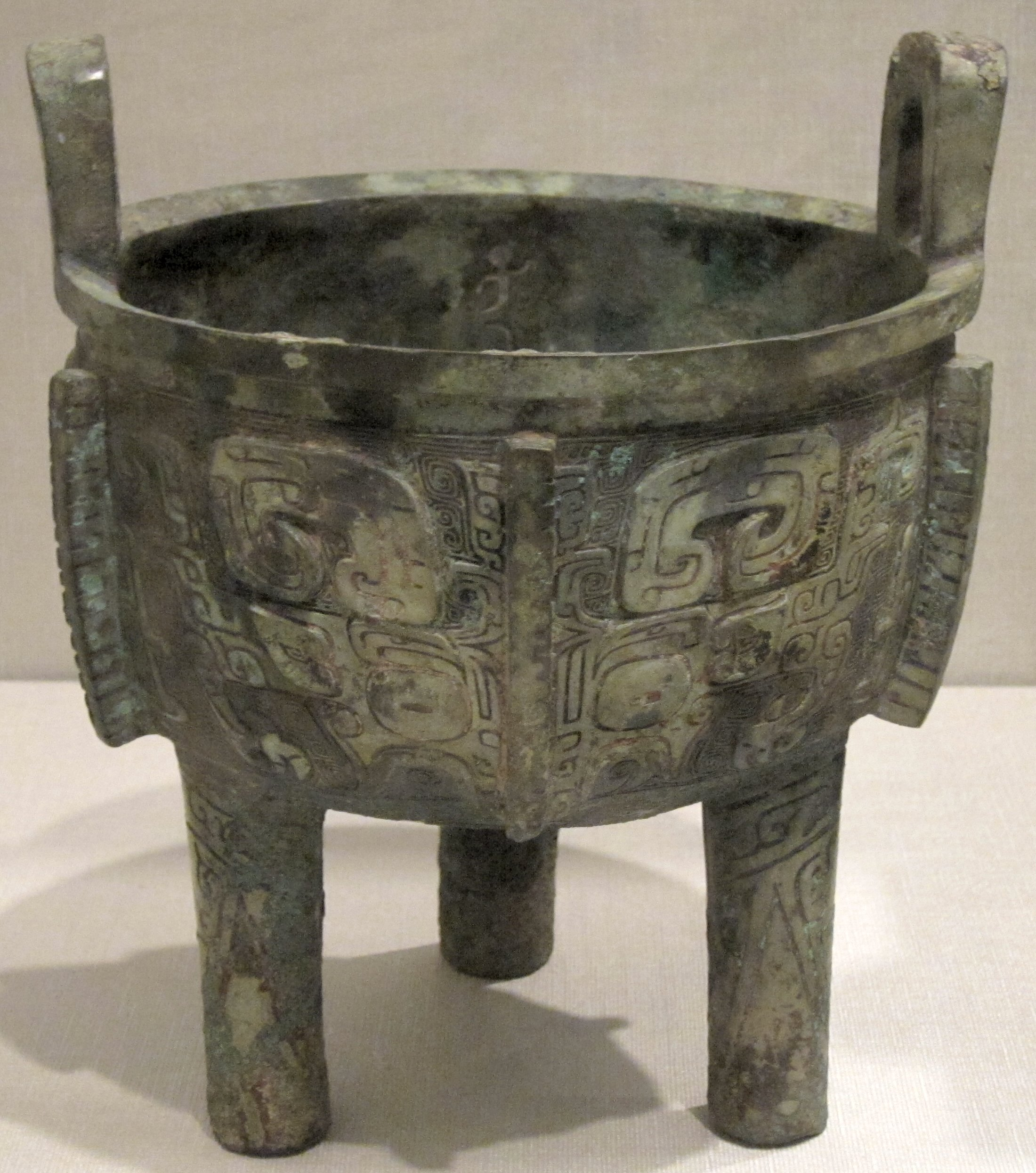
Shang ding, with taotie

Several common themes in decoration span across all types of vessel forms, from hu to pan, and guang to jia. Arguably, the most frequent, though also the most intriguing and mysterious, form of décor is the two eyed motif, often referred to as the taotie. This motif can range from as simple as two protruding half spheres in an otherwise featureless plane to as complex as highly detailed mask-like faces with various animal features such as snouts, fangs and horns. In ding vessels, these taotie faces most often appear on the bowl or cauldron portion of the body, but they can also appear on the legs of the vessels.

Decoration also tends to be used to fill in the background of most vessels, sometimes across the entire body of a vessel, but in other instances only a single band of décor is used. In these backgrounds, a whirl or thunder pattern, a low relief spiral design, is used to fill the space and create a texture across the surface of the vessel.

In later centuries, fully formed three-dimensional animal figures, such as cows, goats, birds, dragons, and lions, were occasionally included on bronze vessels. Some of these animals were purely decorative, while others also had a functional purpose. In one example, the lid of a Li Ding has three lions lying in relaxed positions, holding rings in their mouths; these rings could have been used to lift the lid off of the vessel when it was hot.

A final type of decoration, used in most types of vessels, is the inscription. Inscriptions could be used to identify owner and function; they could be poems or even stories. In one example, the Shi Wang Ding, the inscription is used to tell the story of why the ding was created, as well as make a wish for the lineage of the family who owned it. The Grand Captain's young son Captain Wang says:

Illustriously august deceased-father Duke Jiu was beautifully capable of making accordant his heart and making wise his virtue, with which he served the past kings, and gained purity without flaw. Wang for the first time has gone on to emulate his august deceased-father, respectfully morning and night taking out and bringing in the king's commands, not daring not to follow through or to manage. Because of this, the king has not forgotten the sagely man's descendant, and has greatly praised his accomplishments and awarded him beneficence. Wang dares in response to extol the Son of Heaven's illustriously fine beneficence, herewith making for my august deceased-father Duke Jiu this offertory caldron; may Captain Wang for ten thousand years have sons' sons and grandsons' grandsons eternally to treasure and use it.

== Historical development ==
ding in oracle bone script

One of the many types of bronze vessels, the ding vessel had its origins in standard ceramic vessels with the shape of a tripod. A bronze ding vessel from Panlongcheng, Huangpi, Hubei, for example, inherits its shape from Neolithic pottery. Perhaps the most famous ancient dings were the legendary Nine Tripod Cauldrons. This set of bronze vessels is said to have been cast by King Yu of the Xia dynasty when he divided his territory into the Jiuzhou or Nine Provinces. Later on, possession of all nine was considered a sign of rightful authority over all. The whereabouts of the nine dings are presently unknown, but they are said to have been lost during the imperial Qin dynasty (221–206 BCE), having been passed through various royal dynasties and feudal states.

Ding vessels were used throughout the Shang and Zhou dynasties and later time periods. Round, tripod ding vessels are emblematic of the Shang and Western and Eastern Zhou periods. Western Zhou ding vessels departed from the Shang aesthetic in terms of their oddly-proportioned legs that were deliberately emphasized through the addition of flanged taotie motifs. In terms of their significance throughout history, bronze vessels came to assume a more political role in later dynasties than in the Shang period. Inscriptions cast on Western Zhou ding vessels, for example, commemorate political events and record gifts between monarchs and subjects. The Da Ke ding records a royal award to Ke of royal estate, which is seen as evidence of the breaking up of the estates of old families and their distribution to new families in the transition between different time periods.

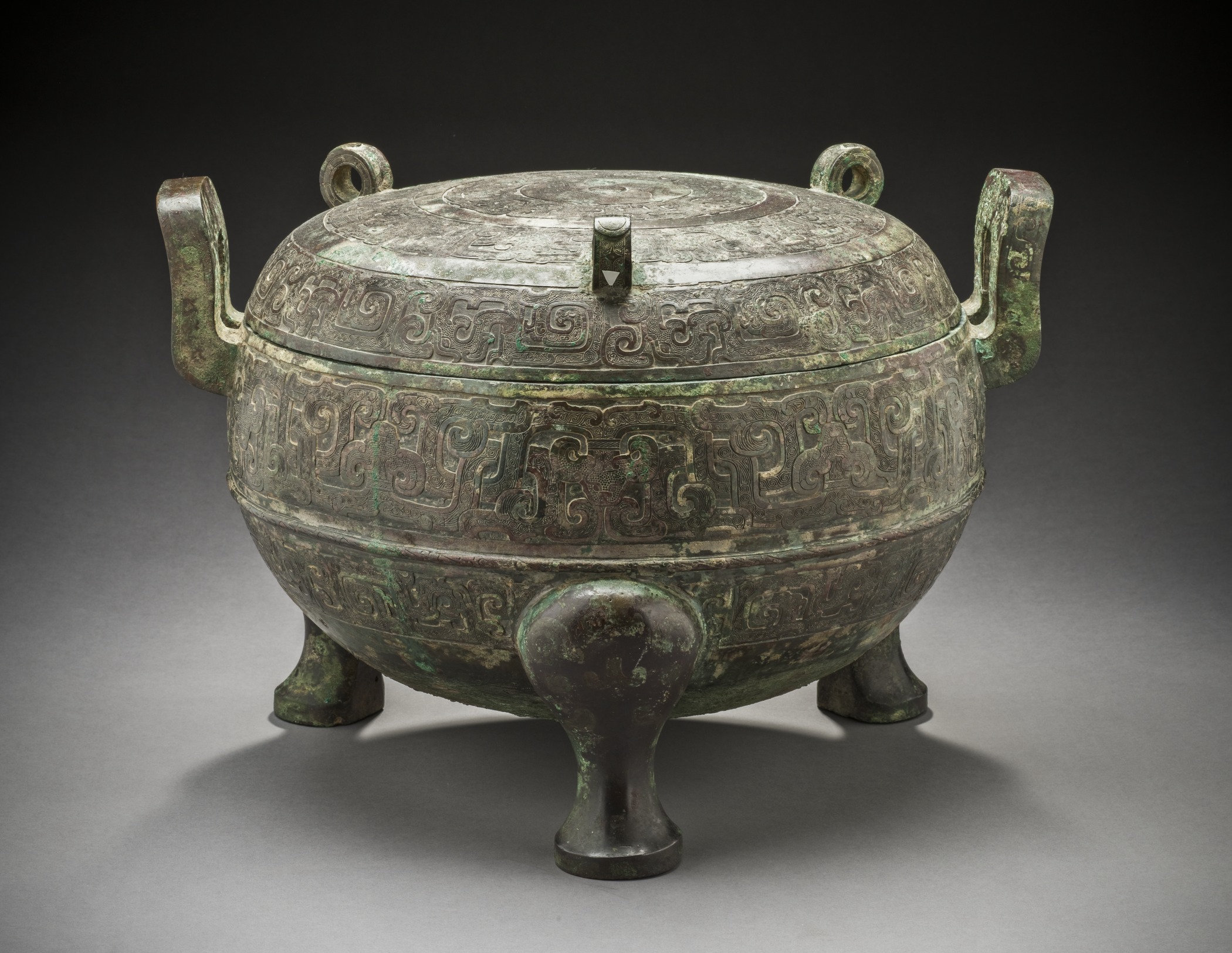
Shanxi province, ancient state of Jin, Middle Eastern Zhou dynasty, late Spring and Autumn or early Warring States period, about 500–450 BCE

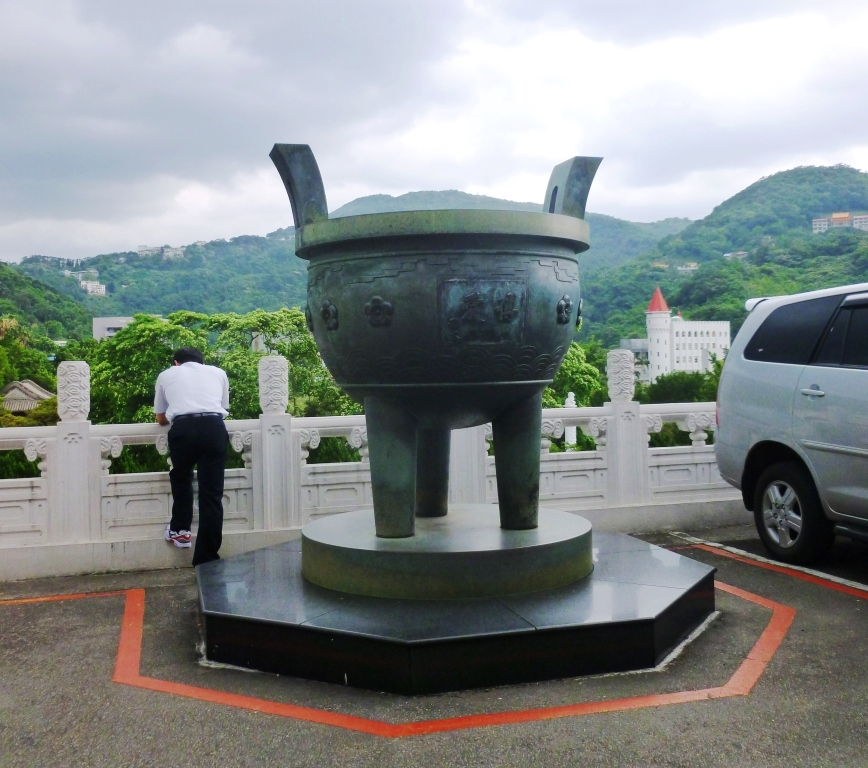
Giant Ding in car park. National Museum, Taipei.

In Late Western Zhou, sets of ding and gui were used to indicate rank; a feudal lord would be entitled to nine ding and six gui, while lesser officials were entitled to a smaller number of vessels. Likewise, late Zhou bronzes were often very large, suggesting corresponding wealth. Early Eastern Zhou bronzes descended directly from those of Western Zhou. In later times, in the middle Warring States period, the three-legged ding would be one of the most popular ceramic forms imitating bronzes.

In western China in an area controlled by Qin, small, shallow tripod ding vessels were produced. For these vessels, groups of ceramic and bronze vessels buried together reveal that Western Zhou vessel types continued to exist over different time periods. Tombs at Baoji and Hu Xian, for example, contain sets of ding among others that are shallow and have cabriole legs. The role of ding vessels in the Zhou period continued, as Qin cemeteries contained ding vessels that expressed rank.

Food vessels such as the fu (簠), gui (簋), and dui (敦) that were popular in the Zhou era disappeared by the Han dynasty, during which the ding, zhong (钟), hu (壶), and fang were the main vessel types used. In Western and Eastern Han, the ding was one of the most common bronze-derived shapes in pottery.

Today, the architecture of the Shanghai Museum is intended to resemble a bronze ding.
