= Taotie =

Ancient Chinese mythological creature

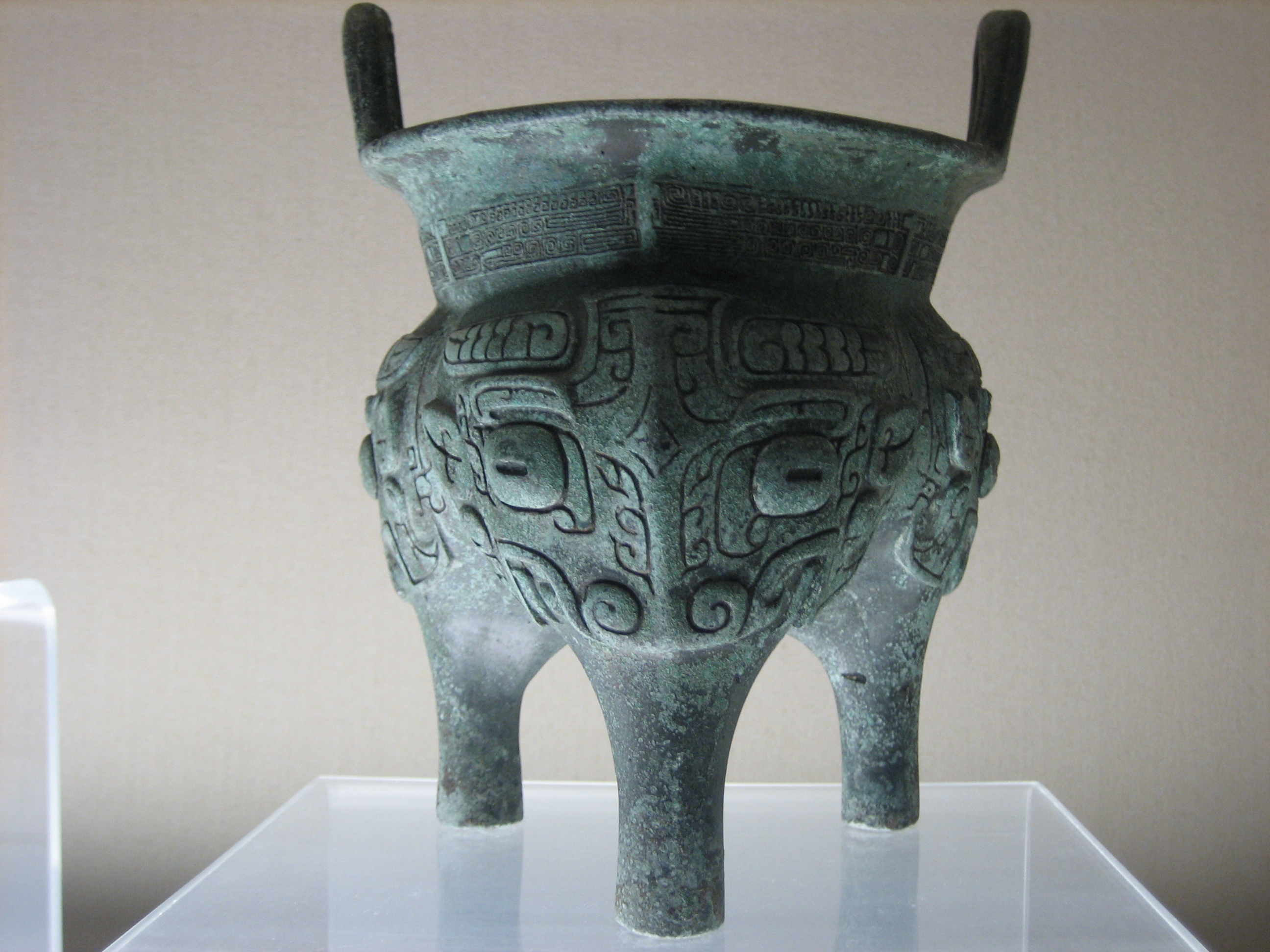
- Taotie on Chinese ritual bronze
- Chinese: 饕餮
Transcriptions
Standard Mandarin
- Hanyu Pinyin: tāotiè
- Gwoyeu Romatzyh: tautieh
- Wade–Giles: t'ao^{1}-t'ieh^{4}
- IPA: [tʰáʊ.tʰjê]
Yue: Cantonese
- Yale Romanization: tōu-tit
- Jyutping: tou1 tit3
- IPA: [tʰɔw˥.tʰit̚˧]
Southern Min
- Hokkien POJ: tho-thiat
Old Chinese
- Baxter–Sagart (2014): *tʰˤaw tʰˤət
- Zhengzhang: *l̥ʰaːw r̥ʰɯːd

The taotie is an ancient Chinese mythological creature that was commonly emblazoned on bronze and other artifacts during the 1st millennium BCE. Taotie are one of the Four Perils in Chinese classics like the Classic of Mountains and Seas, alongside the Hundun, Qiongqi, and Taowu.

The Taotie is often represented as a motif on dings, which are Chinese ritual bronze vessels from the Shang (c. 1600 – c. 1050 BCE) and Zhou dynasties (c. 1046 – 256 BCE). The design typically consists of a zoomorphic mask, described as being frontal, bilaterally symmetrical, with a pair of raised eyes and typically no lower jaw area. Some argue that the design can be traced back to jade pieces found at Neolithic sites belonging to the Liangzhu culture (3310–2250 BCE). There are notable similarities with the jades of the Shijiahe culture (2500-2000 BCE) and the painted pottery of the Lower Xiajiadian culture (2200–1600 BCE).

== Etymology ==
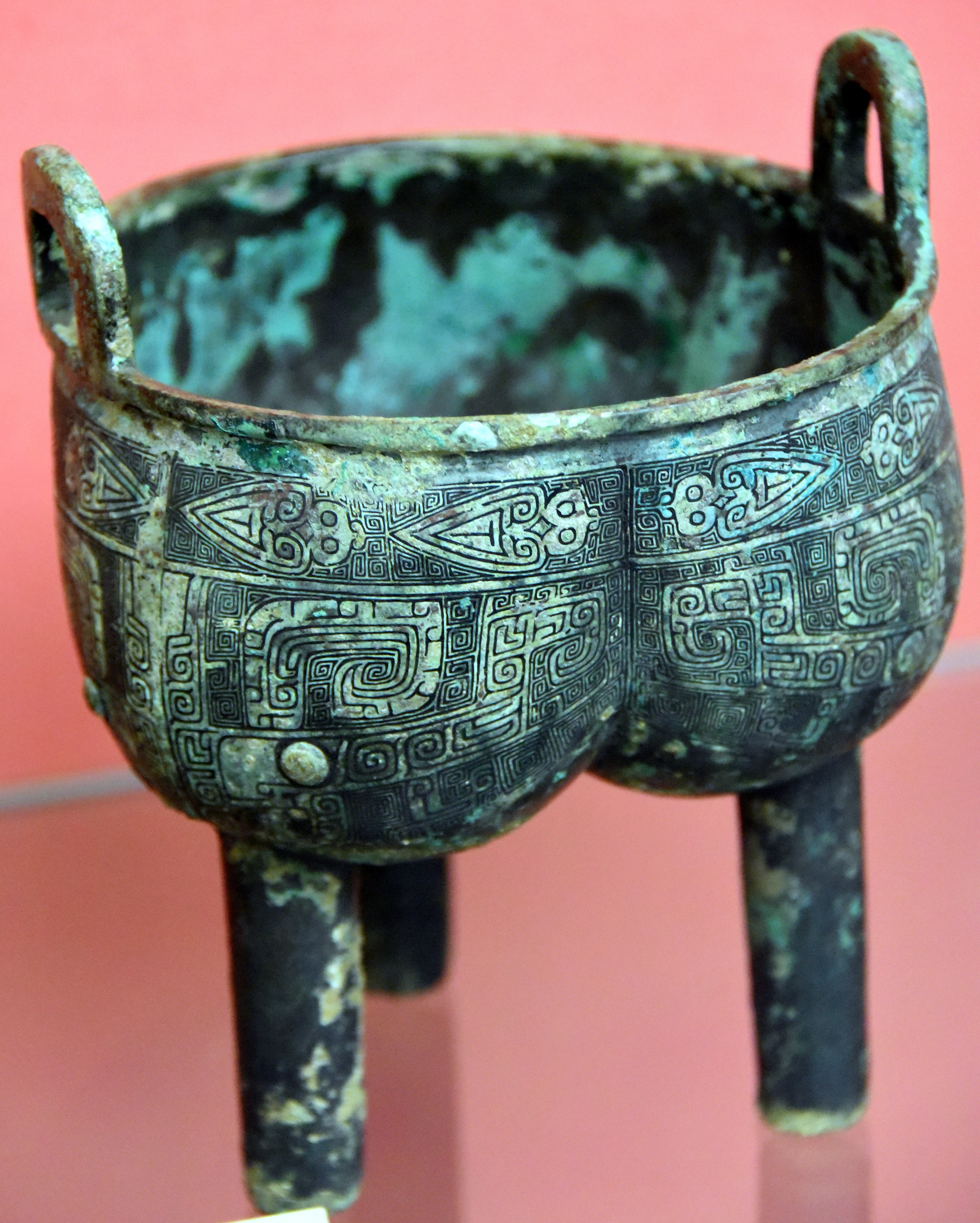
Shang ding for food rituals celebrating ancestors. The surface is decorated with three taotie motifs – Victoria and Albert Museum, London

Although modern scholars use the word taotie, it is actually not known what word the Shang and Zhou dynasties used to call the design on their bronze vessels; as American paleographer Sarah Allan notes, there is no particular reason to assume that the term taotie was known during the Shang period. The first known usage of Taotie is in the Zuo Zhuan, a narrative history of China written in 30 chapters between 722 and 468 BCE. It is used to refer to one of the four evil creatures of the world 四凶; sì xiōng: a greedy and gluttonous son of the Jinyun clan, who lived during the time of the mythical Yellow Emperor. Within the Zuo Zhuan, taotie is used by the writer to imply gluttony.

Nonetheless, the association of the term taotie is synonymous with the motifs found on the ancient Zhou (and Shang) bronzes. The Lüshi Chunqiu (16/3a, "Prophecy") states:

The taotie on Zhou bronzes [ding] has a head but no body. When it eats people, it does not swallow them, but harms them.

However, Allan believes the second part of the sentence should be translated as follows because the association between gluttony (the meaning in the Zuo Zhuan) and the use of dings for food sacrifices to the "insatiable" spirits of the dead is significant:

It devoured a man, but before it could swallow it, its own body was damaged

Li Zehou, a Chinese scholar of philosophy and intellectual history, thinks the description of the taotie in the Lüshi Chunqiu has a much deeper meaning, and that "the meaning of taotie is not [about] 'eating people' but making a mysterious communication between people and Heaven (gods)."

It is hard to explain what is implied in this, as so many myths concerning the taotie have been lost, but the indication that it eats people accords fully with its cruel, fearful countenance. To alien clans and tribes, it symbolized fear and force; to its own clan or tribe, it was a symbol of protection. This religious concept, this dual nature, was crystallized in its strange, hideous features. What appears so savage today had a historical, rational quality in its time. It is for precisely this reason that the savage old myths and legends, the tales of barbarism, and the crude, fierce, and terrifying works of art of ancient clans possessed a remarkable aesthetic appeal. As it was with Homer's epic poems and African masks, so it was with the taotie, in whose hideous features was concentrated a deep-seated historic force. It is because of this irresistible historic force that the mystery and terror of the taotie became the beautiful—the exalted.

== Bronze motifs ==
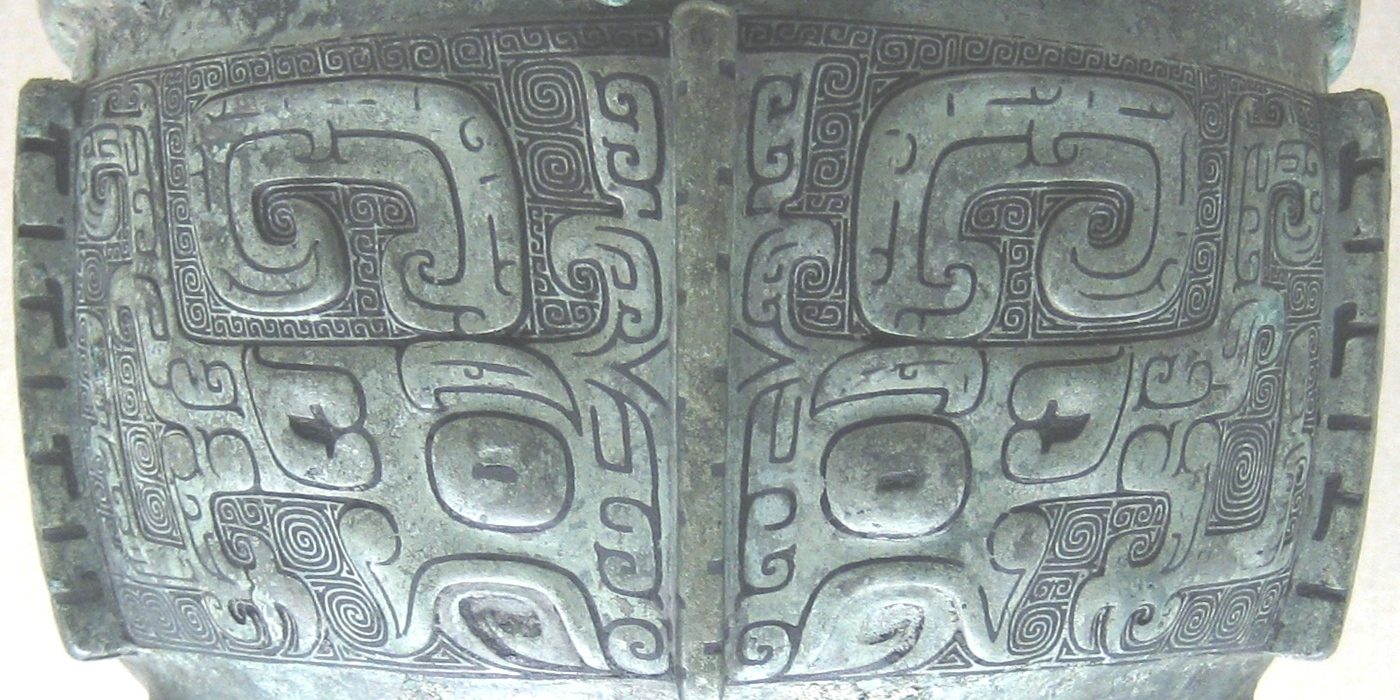
Taotie on a ding bronze vessel from late Shang era

Scholars have long been perplexed over the meaning (if any) of this theriomorphic design, and there is still no commonly held single answer. The hypotheses range from Robert Bagley's belief that the design is a result of the casting process, and rather than having an iconographic meaning was the artistic expression of the artists who held the technological know-how to cast bronze, to theories that it depicts ancient face masks that may have once been worn by either shamans or the god-kings who were the link between humankind and their deceased ancestors (Jordan Paper).

The once-popular belief that the faces depicted the animals used in the sacrificial ceremonies has now more or less been rejected (the faces of oxen, tigers, dragons, etc. may not even be meant to depict actual animals). Modern academics favor an interpretation that supports the idea that the faces have meaning in a religious or ceremonial context, as the objects they appear on are almost always associated with such events or roles. As one scholar writes "art styles always carry some social references." Shang divination inscriptions shed no light on the meaning of the taotie.

== Later interpretations ==
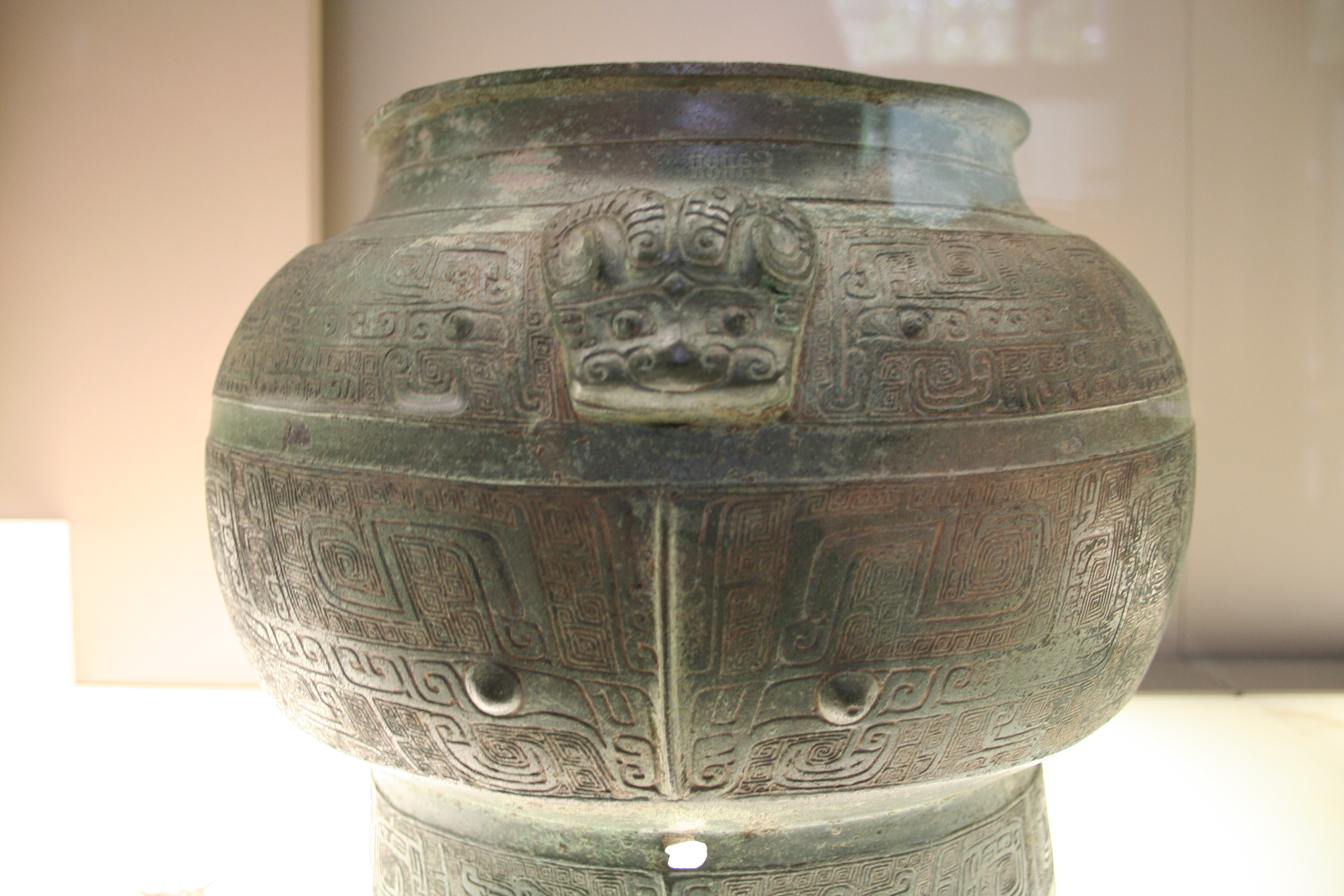
A vessel with a taotie design – Musée Cernuschi, Paris

During the Ming dynasty, a number of scholars compiled lists of traditional motifs seen in architecture and applied art, which eventually became codified as the Nine sons of the dragon. In the earliest known list of this type (in which the creatures are not yet called "children of the dragon", and there are 14 of them, rather than 9), given by Lu Rong (1436–1494) in his Miscellaneous records from the bean garden (菽園雜記, Shuyuan zaji), the taotie appears with a rather unlikely description, as a creature that likes water and depicted on bridges. However, a well-known later list of the Nine Children of the Dragon given by Yang Shen (1488–1559) accords with both the ancient and the modern usage of the term:

The taotie likes to eat and drink; it used to appear on the surface of the dings.

The historian Luo Bi, of the Southern Song dynasty, connected the Taotie motif to Chiyou, writing in the Lushi that the Yellow Emperor "cut his head off; and for this reason sages later cast his portrait on bronzes to warn the greedy." Luo Bi's son, Luo Ping (historian), expanded on this further, writing that:

Chiyou was a spirit of the heavenly magic; his nature and shape were never consistent. The bronzes from the three dynasties were often cast with Chiyou's portrait to warn those who are greedy. The form of Chiyou is most likely an animal, with the addition of wings of flesh; it started at the time of the Yellow Emperor.

In the Book of Imaginary Beings (1957), Jorge Luis Borges interpreted the figures as representing a dog-headed, double-bodied monster that represented greed and gluttony.

== In popular culture ==
The Tao Tie (spelled as "Tao Tei") are the primary antagonists in the 2016 fantasy epic film The Great Wall. In the film, they are depicted as green-skinned quadrupedal reptilian aliens with shark-like teeth, eyes located on their shoulders, and the Tao Tie motif visible on their heads. They are shown living in a eusocial hive similar to ants, from which they attack the capital of China every 60 years to collect food to feed their queen.

A Taotie appears in the Touhou Project spinoff game Touhou Gouyoku Ibun ~ Sunken Fossil World as the primary antagonist (and unlockable playable character) Yuuma Toutetsu, who spends the majority of the games seven scenarios drinking petroleum from Former Hell of Blood Pools. She is a goat-horned girl with curly white hair wielding a large spork as a weapon, and wears a blue dress with patterns inspired by the designs on dings. Yuuma possesses the ability to swallow things both physical and spiritual in order to absorb their power.

Taotie is also represented in Digimon New Century from the Digimon franchise, in the form of Taotiemon. The Digimon is a mammalian monster sporting a large, bronze mask it uses to eat things with, and is one of the Four Perilous Beasts.

Taotie also appeared in Fabulous Beasts (有兽焉) as a red fur ball with 2 horns on his head, wings on the back and several patterned dots on his face. His eyes are at his armpits and normally wears eyes purely of makeup. Taotie has a haughty and bold megalomaniac, having a high ego of himself and is one of the Four Perils in the story

In the Age of Mythology: Retold downloadable content Immortal Pillars, the Taotie is a form of mythical creature recruitable by the Chinese pantheon under Nüba.

== See also ==
- Four Symbols (China)
- Four Perils
