= Shanghai Museum =

Museum in the Huangpu District of Shanghai, China

- 上海博物馆
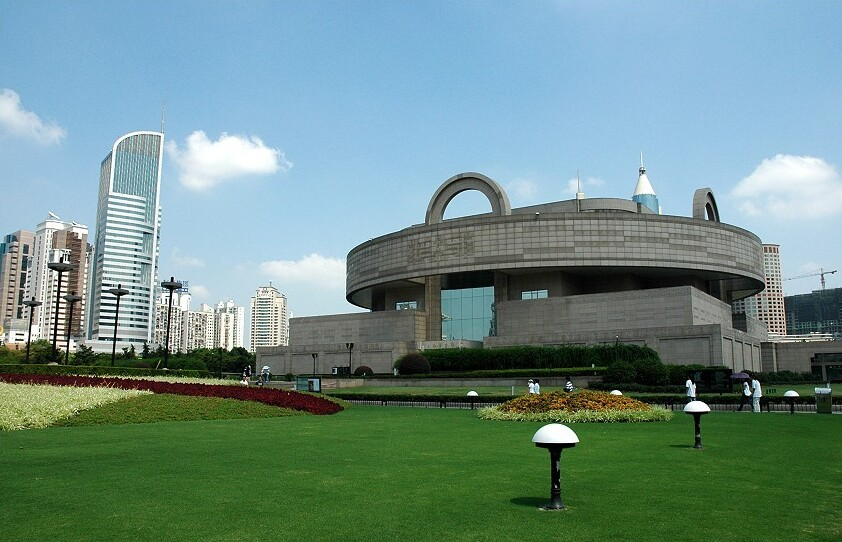

- Location within Shanghai
- Established: 1952
- Location: 201 Renmin Avenue, People's Square, Shanghai, 200003
- Coordinates: 31.230278°N 121.470556°E
- Visitors: 2,109,200 (2017)
- Director: Ma Chengyuan (1985–1999)
- Public transit access: People's Square Station on Lines 1, 2, and 8 (Shanghai Metro)
- Website: shanghaimuseum.net

Shanghai Museum
- Simplified Chinese: 上海博物馆
- Traditional Chinese: 上海博物館
Transcriptions
Standard Mandarin
- Hanyu Pinyin: Shànghǎi Bówùguǎn
Yue: Cantonese
- Yale Romanization: Seuhnghói Bokmahtgún

The Shanghai Museum is a public municipal museum of ancient Chinese art, situated on the People's Square in the Huangpu District of Shanghai, China. It is funded by the Shanghai Municipal Culture and Tourism Bureau.

Rebuilt at its current location in 1996, it is famous for its large collection of rare cultural pieces.

== History ==
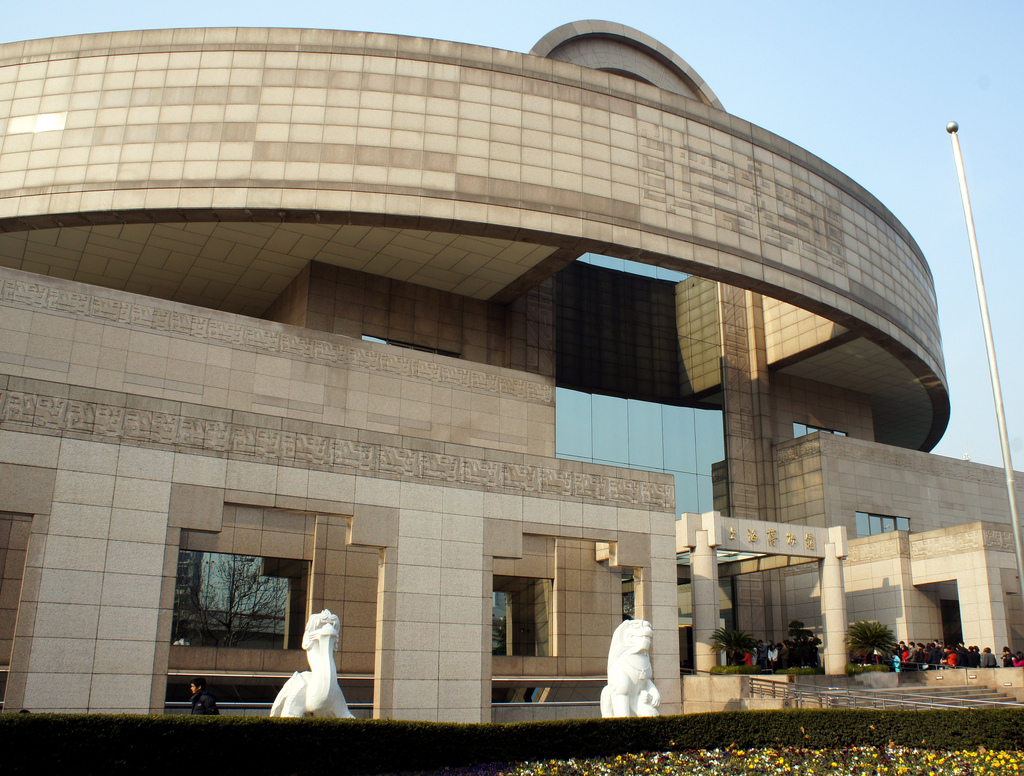
Exterior of Shanghai Museum

The museum was founded in 1952 and was first open to the public in the former Shanghai Racecourse club house, now at 325 West Nanjing Road. The founding collections came principally from three sources: a batch of artifacts gathered by the Communist 3rd Field Army during the civil war from accidental finds and confiscations of private property and brought to Shanghai upon the Communists' conquest of the city; artifacts confiscated by the customs service; items sold by private collectors due to political pressure during political purges and purchased by the government. The former Shanghai Municipal Museum was also merged into the new Shanghai Museum.

In the next few years, the museum's collections were further enriched from other private and institutional collections in Shanghai, including the collection of the former Shanghai Museum of the Royal Asiatic Society, which were moved to the museum as "foreign" institutions gradually left the city in the 1950s. In 1959 the museum moved into the Zhonghui Building at 16 South Henan Road, which housed insurance companies and bank offices. During the metal-gathering campaign of the Great Leap Forward, the Shanghai Museum participated in rescuing bronzeware from metal that had been confiscated or donated and were sent to be melted down. Before the Cultural Revolution, a tradition formed whereby Shanghai's wealthy collectors would make annual donations to the museum.

The museum's work largely halted as a result of the Cultural Revolution. After the end of the revolution, as one of China's most important museums, the collections have continued to be enriched with the fruit of donations, government purchases, and important finds from archaeological excavations.

The growth of its collections put enormous pressure on the cramped premises. For his role in ensuring a large, purpose-built home, it is said that Shanghai Museum owes much of its current existence to Ma Chengyuan, its director from 1985 until his retirement in 1999. When a new museum was omitted from Shanghai's five-year reconstruction plan in 1992, Ma lobbied Mayor Huang Ju for its rebuilding. After seeing the dilapidated rooms of the Zhonghui Building, Huang agreed to allocate a prime site on the People's Square, but the museum had to raise its own building funds. Ma raised US$25 million by leasing the old building to a Hong Kong developer. He also made many trips abroad to solicit donations, mainly from the Shanghai diaspora who had fled to Hong Kong after the Communist revolution, raising another $10 million. The money still ran short, but he eventually won another 140 million yuan from the city government to complete the building.

Construction of the current building started in August 1993. It was inaugurated on October 12, 1996 to wide acclaim. It is 29.5 meters high with five floors, covering a total area of 39,200 m^{2}.

Designed by local architect Xing Tonghe, the building is designed in the shape of an ancient bronze cooking vessel called a ding. It is said that the inspiration for the design was specifically provided by the Da Ke ding, now on exhibit in the museum. The building has a round top and a square base, symbolizing the ancient Chinese perception of the world as "round sky, square earth" (Chinese: 天圆地方).

== Collections ==
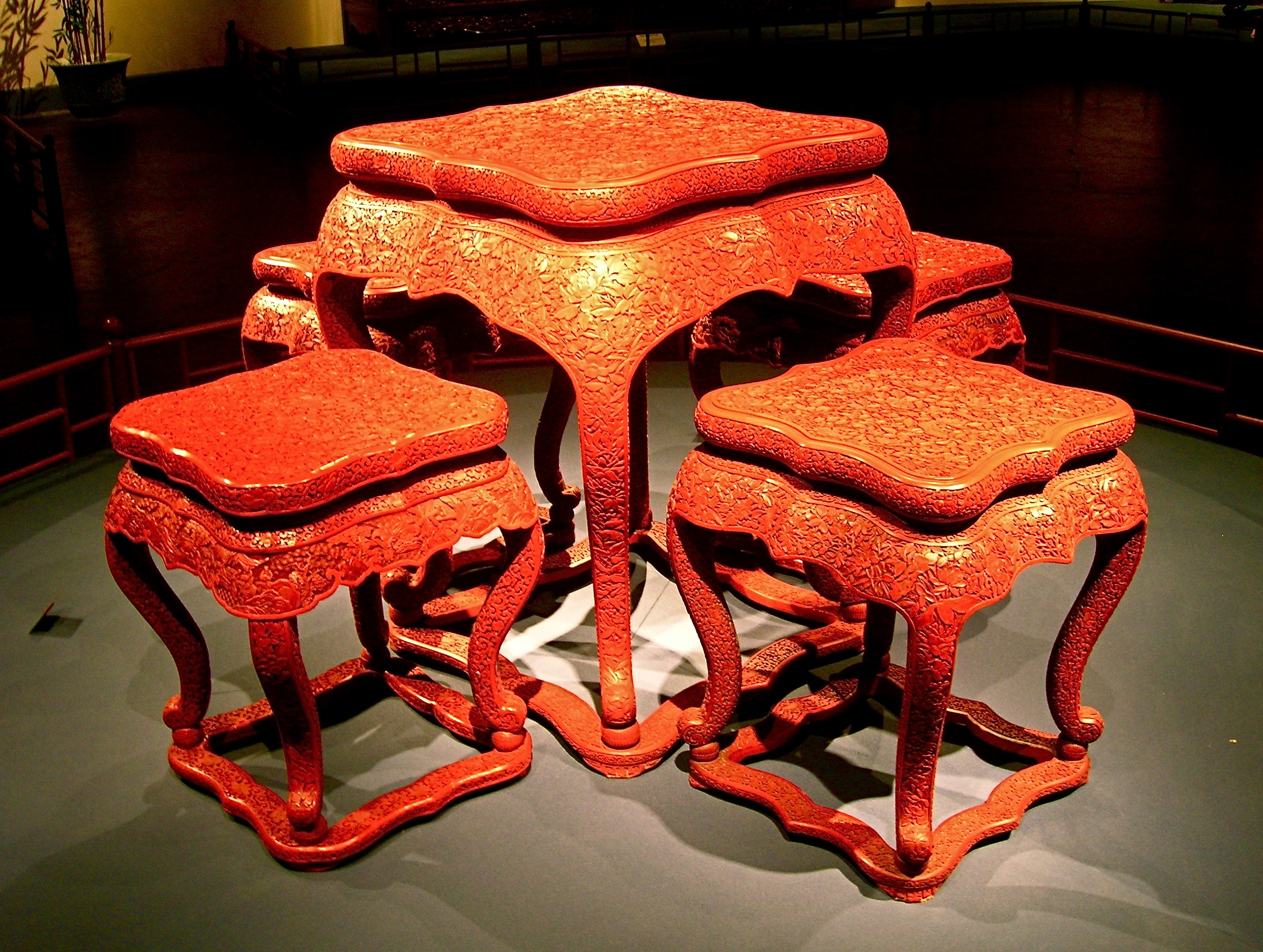
Carved lacquer furniture

The museum has a collection of over 120,000 pieces, including bronze, ceramics, calligraphy, furniture, jades, ancient coins, paintings, seals, sculptures, minority art and foreign art. The Shanghai Museum houses several items of national importance, including one of three extant specimens of a "transparent" bronze mirror from the Han dynasty.

=== Galleries ===
It has eleven galleries and three special temporary exhibition halls. The permanent galleries are:

- Gallery of Ancient Chinese Bronze
- Gallery of Ancient Chinese Sculpture
- Gallery of Ancient Chinese Ceramics
- Gallery of Ancient Chinese Jades
- Gallery of Ancient Chinese Paintings
- Gallery of Ancient Chinese Calligraphy
- Gallery of Ancient Chinese Seals
- Gallery of Ancient Chinese Numismatics
- Gallery of Chinese furniture in Ming and Qing dynasties
- Gallery of Arts and Crafts by Chinese Minorities
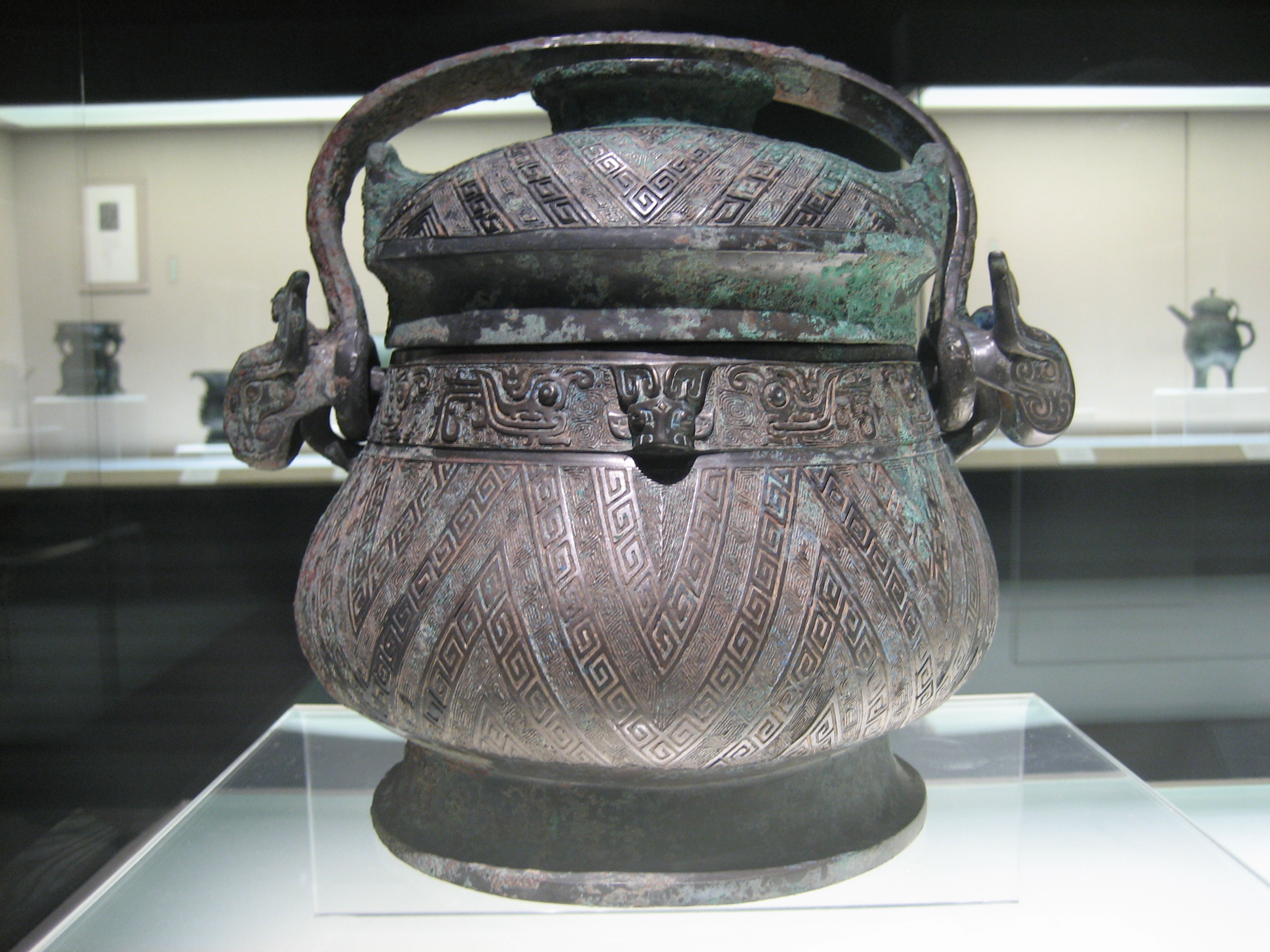
You with zigzag thunder pattern, early Zhou dynasty

Ru ware porcelain wares from the Northern Song dynasty

Ming dynasty style furniture and room arrangement

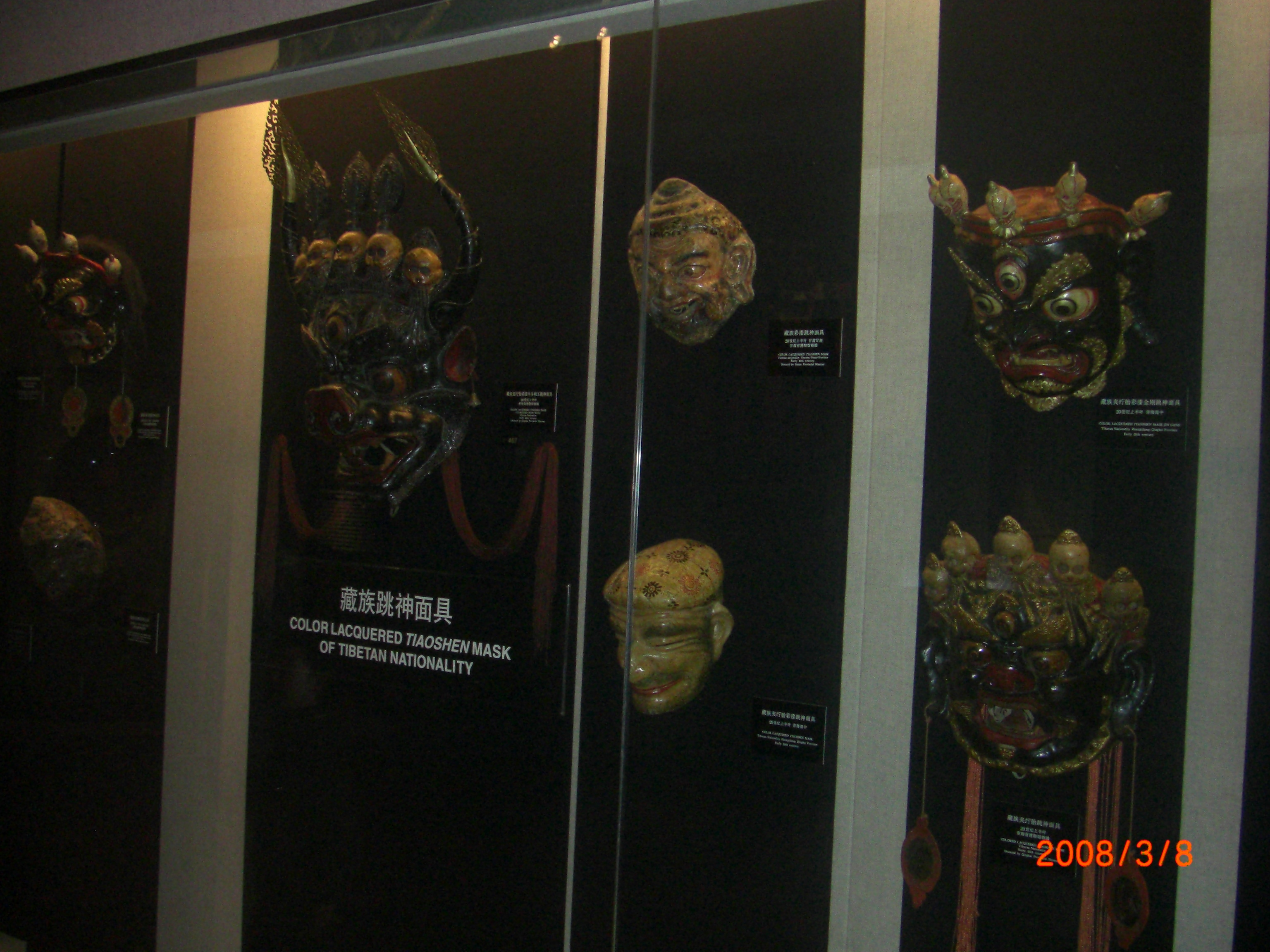
Colour lacquered Tiaoshen (跳神) Mask of Tibetan ethnicity

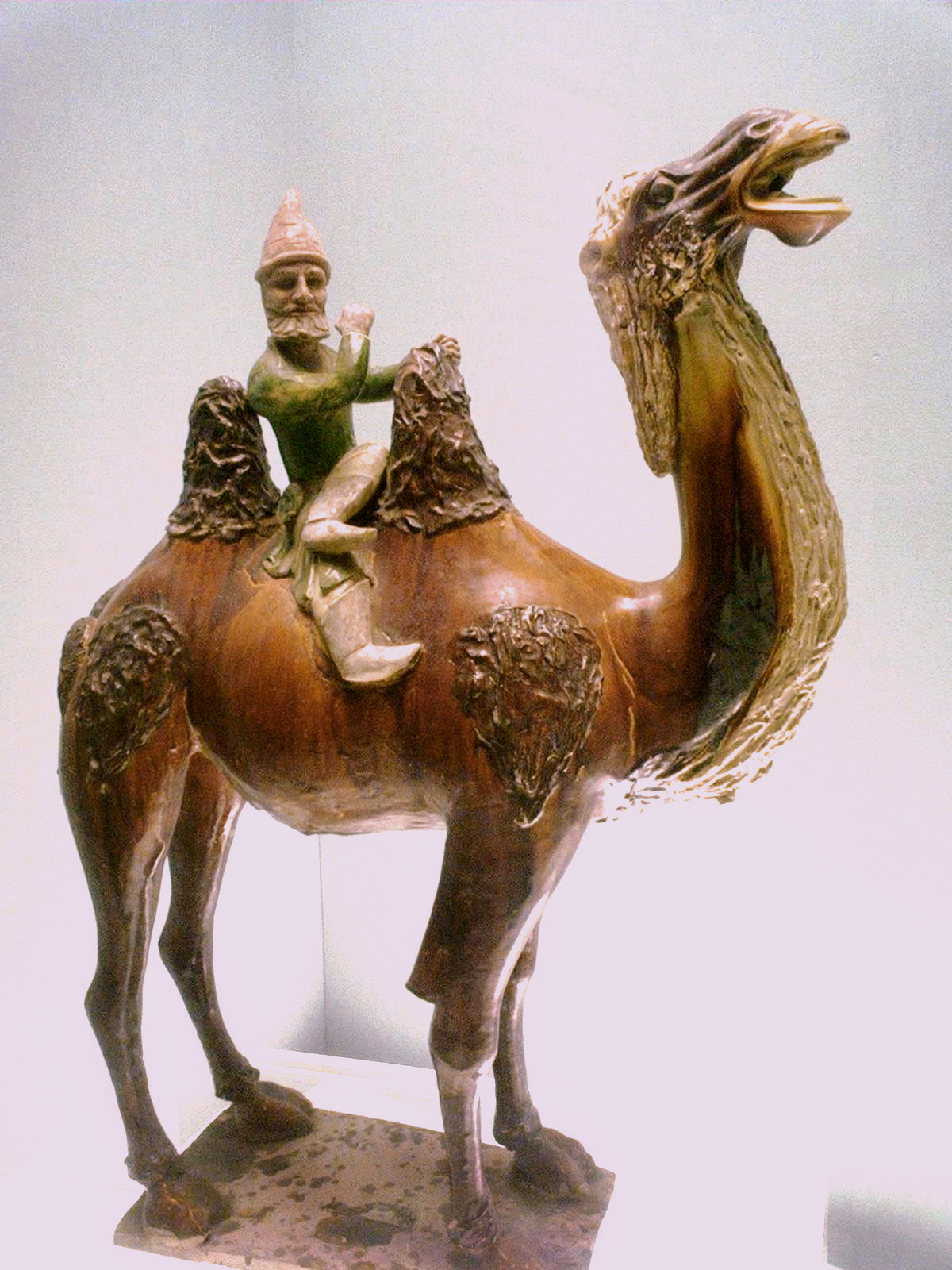
Sogdian on a camel, in Sancai style, Tang dynasty

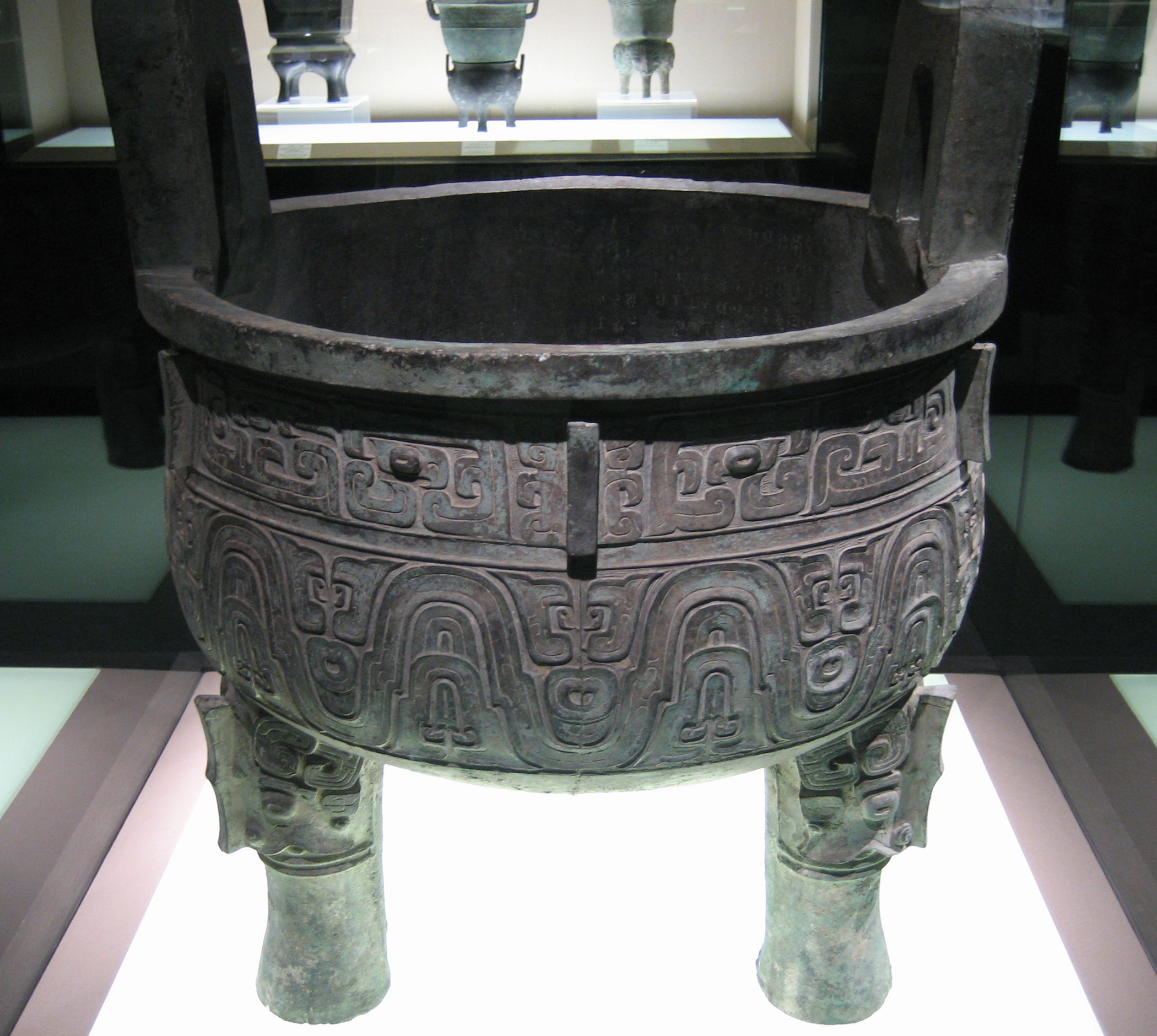
Da Ke ding, from late Western Zhou

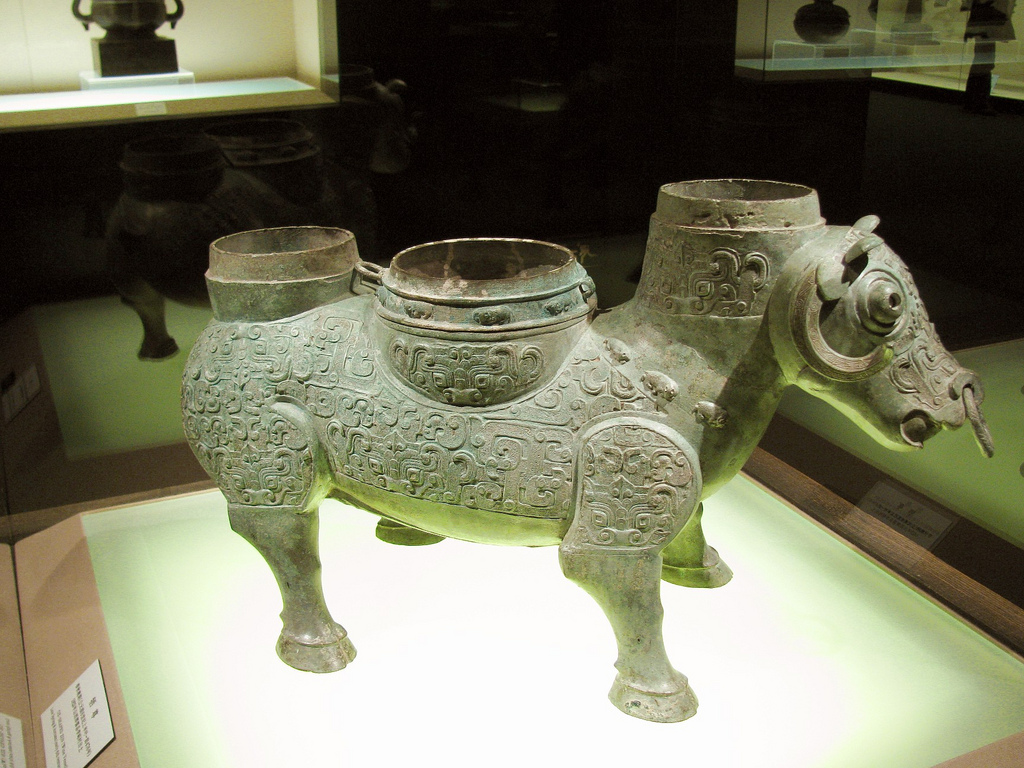
Xi Zun (牺尊), from the late Spring and Autumn period

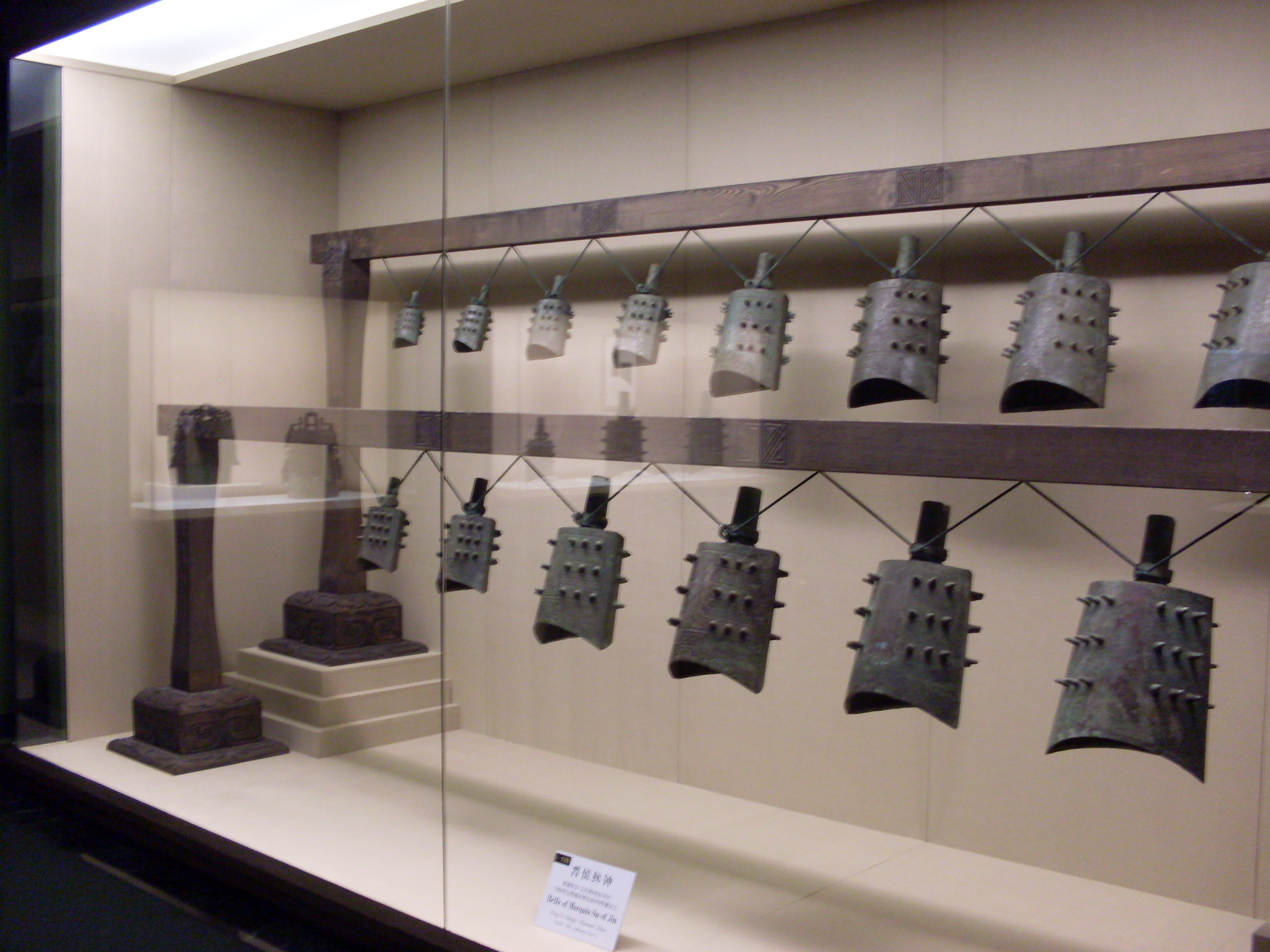
Bianzhong of Marquis Su of Jin, from Western Zhou

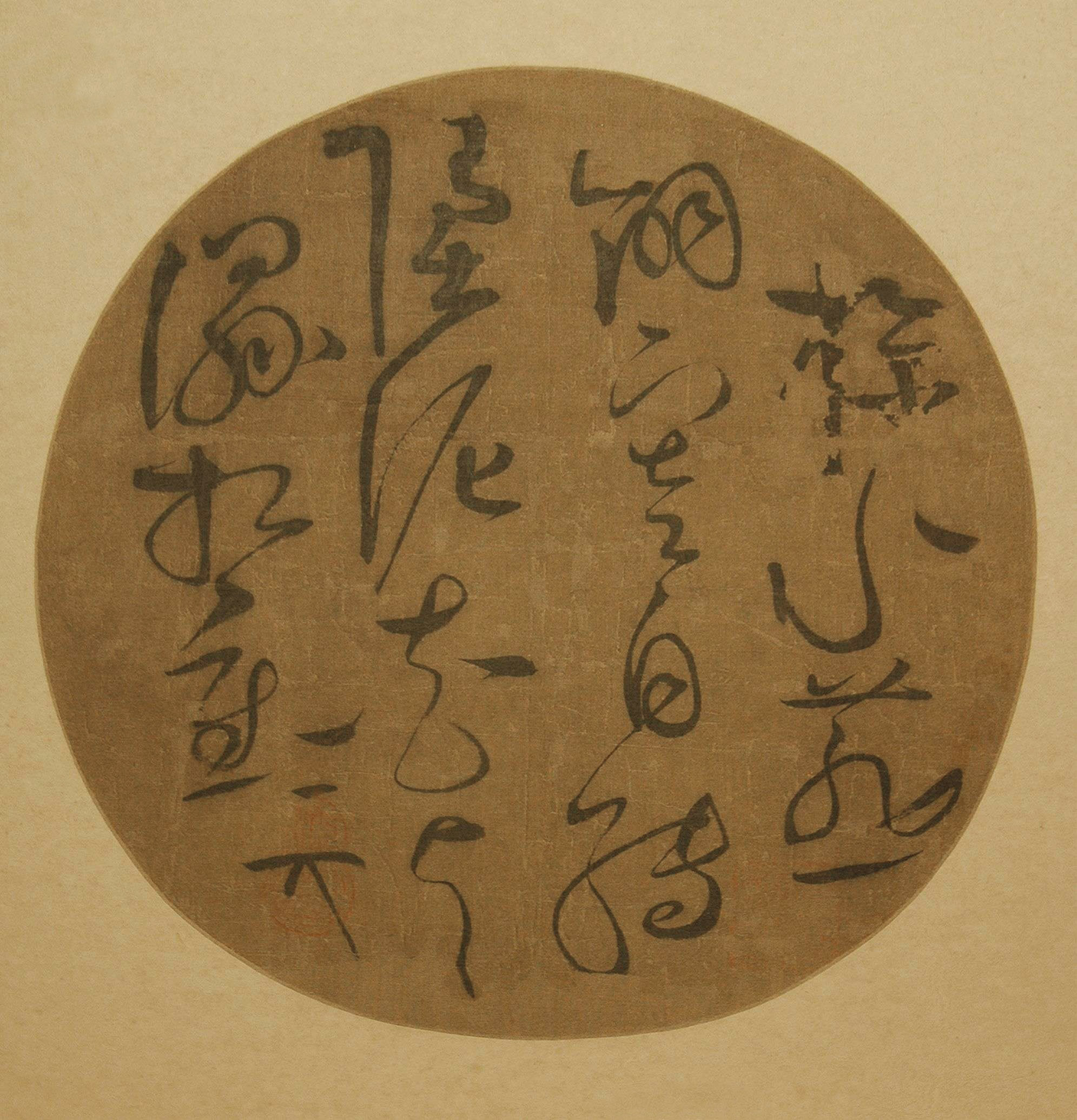
Calligraphy on a round fan by Emperor Huizong of Song

=== Numismatic Collections ===
The museum has an important collection of ancient coins from the Silk Road, donated since 1991 by Linda and Roger Doo. The collection contains 1783 pieces from the Greeks to the Mongol Empire.

== Selected publications ==
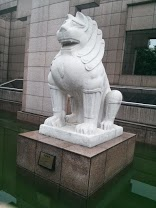
Lion sculpture, Shanghai Museum, China, 2013.

- Ancient Chinese Ceramic Gallery The Shanghai Museum. Shanghai: Shanghai Classics Publishing House, 1996. (English & Mandarin Chinese edition.) ISBN 7-5325-1721-7

== See also ==
- List of museums in China
- Shanghai history museums
- Shanghai Museum East

== Bibliography ==
Chen Xiejan, Doo R, Wang Yue (2006) Shanghai Museum's Collection of Ancient Coins from the Silk Road
